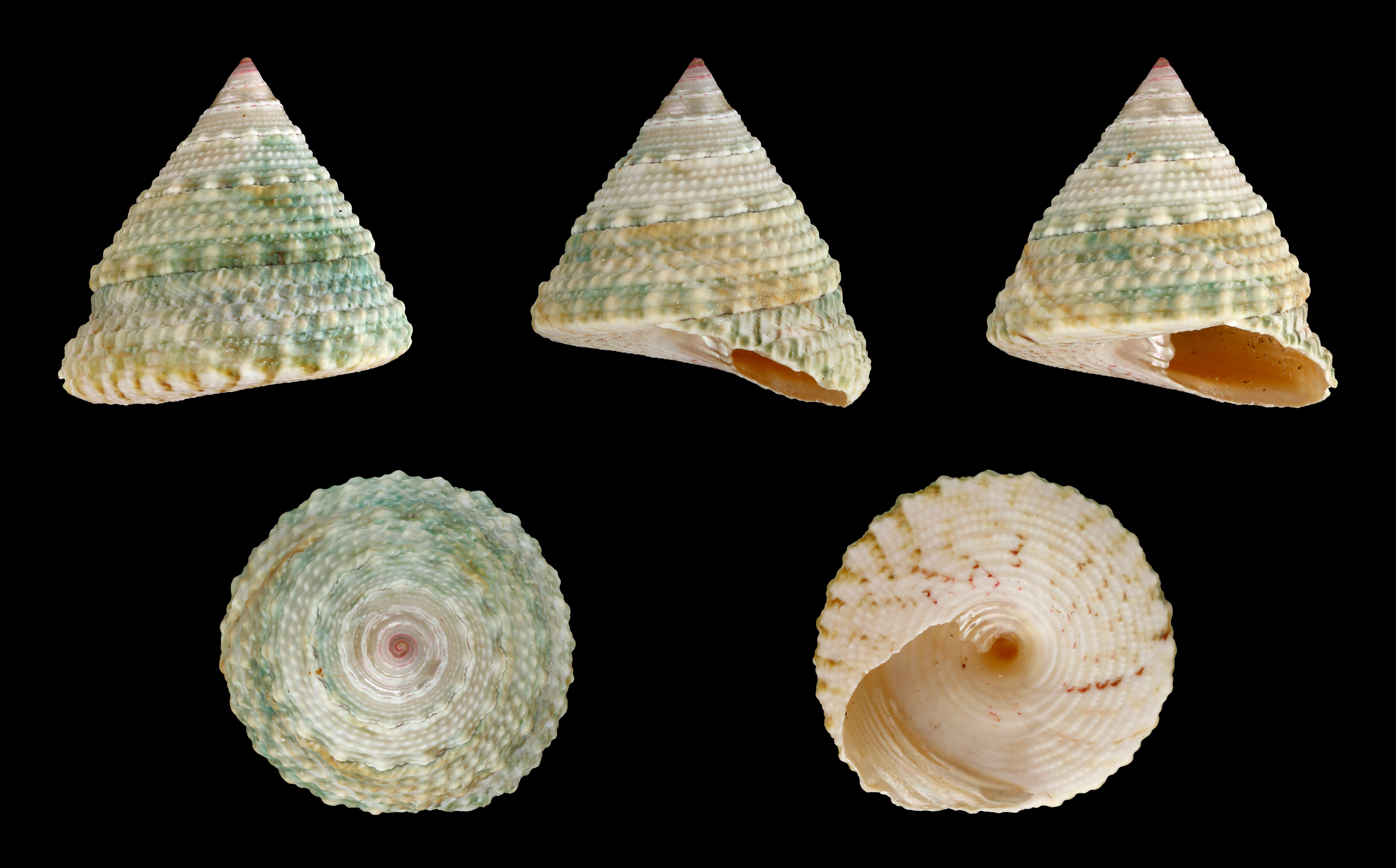
- Five views of a shell of Trochus maculatus

Scientific classification
- Kingdom: Animalia
- Phylum: Mollusca
- Class: Gastropoda
- Subclass: Vetigastropoda
- Order: Trochida
- Family: Trochidae
- Genus: Trochus; Linnaeus, 1758

Species
- See text

Synonyms
- Camelotrochus B. A. Marshall, 1998; Infundibulops Pilsbry, 1889; Infundibulum (Lamprostoma) Swainson, 1840; Lamprostoma Swainson, 1840; Polydonta Schumacher, 1817; Praecia J. E. Gray, 1857 ·; Trochus (Camelotrochus) B. A. Marshall, 1998· alternate representation; Trochus (Infundibulops) Pilsbry, 1889 · alternate representation; Trochus (Polydonta) Schumacher, 1817; Trochus (Praecia) J. E. Gray, 1857 · alternate representation; Trochus (Trochus) Linnaeus, 1758 · alternate representation

= Trochus =

Genus of gastropods

Trochus is a genus of medium-to large-sized, top-shaped sea snails with an operculum, of the family Trochidae, the top snails.

When the word "trochus" or "Trochus" is used in reference to fishing sea snails for commercial purposes, the usual species targeted is Tectus niloticus, which is valued for its nacre or mother of pearl layer, which was traditionally made into items such as pearl buttons and jewelry. Tectus niloticus is no longer classified as a Trochus species, and it is no longer classified in the family Trochidae; it is now placed in the family Tegulidae.

== History ==
The name Trochus, according to P. Fischer was used for the first time by Guillaume Rondelet, in 1558, who assembled under this title a rather miscellaneous assortment of univalves. Linnaeus' genus Trochus is composed principally of true Trochidae, but it is now viewed as having contained species of several other very different families.

Lamarck further restricted the group, by eliminating several genera; and in the 19th century the labors of Gray, H. Adams and A. Adams and others, contributed towards a more systematic arrangement of the family. Further revisions have narrowed down the number of species in this genus, and most names have become synonyms.

== Shell description ==
Sea snails in the genus Trochus have large, thick, solid shells that have a broadly conical spire and a flat to convex base. The periphery is angulated. The outer and basal lips are smooth within. The columella has a strong fold above, ending in an obtuse tooth below.

The interior of the shell is pearly and iridescent because of a thick layer of nacre (mother of pearl).

== Species ==
Species within the genus Trochus include:

- † Trochus antipodum Wilckens, 1922
- Trochus calcaratus Souverbie in Souverbie & Montrouzier, 1875
- Trochus californicus (A. Adams, 1853)
- Trochus camelophorus Webster, 1906
- Trochus cariniferus Reeve, 1842
- Trochus chloromphalus (A. Adams, 1851)
- Trochus concinnus Philippi, 1846
- Trochus cumingii A. Adams, 1853
- Trochus elegantulus W. Wood, 1828
- Trochus erithreus Brocchi, 1821
- Trochus fastigiatus A. Adams, 1853
- Trochus ferreirai Bozzetti, 1996
- Trochus firmus Philippi, 1849
- Trochus flammulatus Lamarck, 1822
- Trochus fultoni Melvill, 1898
- Trochus histrio Reeve, 1848
- Trochus intextus Kiener, 1850
- Trochus kochii Philippi, 1844
- Trochus kotschyi Philippi, 1849
- Trochus laciniatus Reeve, 1861
- Trochus maculatus Linnaeus, 1758
- Trochus nigropunctatus Reeve, 1861
- Trochus noduliferus Lamarck, 1822
- Trochus obesus Reeve, 1861
- Trochus ochroleucus Gmelin, 1791
- Trochus radiatus Gmelin, 1791
- Trochus rota Dunker, 1860
- Trochus sacellum Philippi, 1855
- Trochus squarrosus Lamarck, 1822
- Trochus stellatus Gmelin, 1791
- † Trochus subanceps Sinzow, 1897
- Trochus subincarnatus P. Fisher, 1879
- Trochus submorum (Abrard, 1942)
- Trochus tentorium Gmelin, 1791
- Trochus tubiferus Kiener, 1850
- Trochus venetus Reeve, 1862
- Trochus zhangi Dong, 2002

== Synonyms ==
Long list of synonyms
- Trochus abanteus Nardo, 1847: synonym of Jujubinus montagui (Wood, 1828)
- Trochus abrodiaetus Nardo, 1847: synonym of Gibbula adriatica (Philippi, 1844)
- Trochus abyssorum E.A. Smith, 1891: synonym of Bathybembix abyssorum (E. A. Smith, 1891)
- Trochus acinosus Gould, 1849: synonym of Coelotrochus viridis (Gmelin, 1791)
- Trochus acuminatus Wood, 1828: synonym of Bembicium nanum (Lamarck, 1822)
- Trochus acuminatus Perry, 1811: synonym of Cantharidus opalus (Martyn, 1784)
- Trochus acutangulus Philippi : synonym of Trochus maculatus Linnaeus, 1758
- Trochus adansoni [sic]: synonym of Gibbula adansonii (Payraudeau, 1826)
- Trochus adansonii Payraudeau, 1826: synonym of Gibbula adansonii (Payraudeau, 1826)
- Trochus adriaticus Philippi, 1844: synonym of Gibbula adriatica (Philippi, 1844)
- Trochus adspersus Philippi, 1851: synonym of Calliostoma adspersum (Philippi, 1851)
- Trochus aeglees Watson, 1879: synonym of Calliotropis aeglees (Watson, 1879)
- Trochus aegyptius Gmelin, 1791: synonym of Rubritrochus declivis (Forskål, 1775)
- Trochus agathensis Récluz, 1843: synonym of Gibbula umbilicalis (da Costa, 1778)
- Trochus agrestis Philippi, 1843: synonym of Calliostoma zizyphinum (Linnaeus, 1758)
- Trochus alabastrum Reeve, 1858: synonym of Euchelus alabastrum (Reeve, 1858)
- Trochus alabastrum Lovén, 1846: synonym of Calliostoma occidentale (Mighels & C. B. Adams, 1842)
- Trochus albidus Wood W., 1828: synonym of Calliostoma zizyphinum (Linnaeus, 1758)
- Trochus albidus Gmelin, 1791: synonym of Gibbula albida (Gmelin, 1791)
- Trochus altus Reeve (non Philippi), 1862: synonym of Trochus maculatus Linnaeus, 1758
- Trochus alveolatus Philippi, 1851: synonym of Gibbula spratti (Forbes, 1844)
- Trochus amabilis Jeffreys, 1865: synonym of Solariella amabilis (Jeffreys, 1865)
- Trochus americanus Gmelin, 1791: synonym of Lithopoma americanum (Gmelin, 1791)
- Trochus angulatus Tokunaga, 1906: synonym of Conotalopia ornata (G. B. Sowerby III, 1903)
- Trochus anomala d'Orbigny, 1842: synonym of Vitrinella anomala (d'Orbigny, 1842)
- Trochus ardens Salis Marschlins, 1793: synonym of Gibbula ardens (Salis Marschlins, 1793)
- Trochus areola Gmelin, 1791: synonym of Heliacus (Heliacus) areola areola (Gmelin, 1791): synonym of Heliacus areola (Gmelin, 1791)
- Trochus argenteonitens Lischke, 1872: synonym of Ginebis argenteonitens (Lischke, 1872)
- Trochus armillatus Wood, 1828: synonym of Astele armillata (Wood, 1828)
- Trochus articulatus (Lamarck, 1822): synonym of Phorcus articulatus (Lamarck, 1822)
- Trochus asper Gmelin, 1791: synonym of Euchelus asper (Gmelin, 1791)
- Trochus asteriscus Reeve, 1843: synonym of Astralium asteriscum (Reeve, 1843)
- Trochus atratus Wood, 1828: synonym of Osilinus atratus (Wood, 1828)
- Trochus attenuatus Jonas, 1844: synonym of Tosatrochus attenuatus (Jonas, 1844)
- Trochus auratus Quoy & Gaimard, 1834: synonym of Bembicium auratum (Quoy & Gaimard, 1834)
- Trochus aureus Jonas, 1844: synonym of Bellastraea aurea (Jonas, 1844)
- Trochus baccatus G.B. Sowerby, 1889: synonym of Infundibulops cariniferus (Reeve, 1842)
- Trochus basteroti Hoernes, 1848: synonym of Gibbula adriatica (Philippi, 1844)
- Trochus baudoni Monterosato, 1891: synonym of Jujubinus baudoni (Monterosato, 1891)
- Trochus belcheri Philippi, 1849: synonym of Monilea belcheri (Philippi, 1849)
- Trochus bellardii Issel, 1869: synonym of Ethalia bellardii (Issel, 1869)
- Trochus biasoletti Philippi, 1836: synonym of Gibbula albida (Gmelin, 1791)
- Trochus bicanaliculatus Dunker in Philippi, 1844: synonym of Diloma bicanaliculata (Dunker in Philippi, 1844)
- Trochus bicarinatus Gray J.E., 1834: synonym of Gibbula magus (Linnaeus, 1758)
- Trochus bicolor Perry, G., 1811: synonym of Trochus radiatus Gmelin, 1791
- Trochus bicolor Risso, 1826: synonym of Jujubinus exasperatus (Pennant, 1777)
- Trochus bilabiatus Philippi, 1846: synonym of Danilia tinei (Calcara, 1839)
- Trochus bornii Cantraine, 1835: synonym of Gibbula albida (Gmelin, 1791)
- Trochus brevispina Lamarck, 1822: synonym of Lithopoma brevispina (Lamarck, 1822)
- Trochus broderipi Philippi, 1855: synonym of Astele rubiginosa (Valenciennes, 1846)
- Trochus brunneus Philippi, 1849: synonym of Tegula brunnea (Philippi, 1849)
- Trochus caelatus Gmelin, 1791: synonym of Lithopoma caelatum (Gmelin, 1791)
- Trochus calcaratus Souverbie in Souverbie & Montrouzier, 1875: synonym of Infundibulum calcaratum (Souverbie in Souverbie & Montrouzier, 1874)
- Trochus callicoccus Philippi, 1849: synonym of Trochus maculatus Linnaeus, 1758
- Trochus calliferus Lamarck, 1822: synonym of Monilea callifera (Lamarck, 1822)
- Trochus callosus Koch in Philippi, 1844: synonym of Ethalia sanguinea Pilsbry, 1905
- Trochus calyptraeformis Lamarck, 1822: synonym of Sigapatella calyptraeformis (Lamarck, 1822)
- Trochus canaliculatus Lamarck, 1818: synonym of Euchelus atratus (Gmelin, 1791)
- Trochus cancellatus Jeffreys, 1883: synonym of Vetulonia paucivaricosa (Dautzenberg, 1889)
- Trochus candei d'Orbigny, 1844: synonym of Gibbula candei (d'Orbigny, 1844)
- Trochus capensis Gmelin, 1791: synonym of Gibbula capensis (Gmelin, 1791)
- Trochus carinatus d'Orbigny, 1842: synonym of Vitrinella carinata (d'Orbigny, 1842)
- Trochus carmesinus Webster, 1908: synonym of Coelotrochus carmesinus (Webster, 1908)
- Trochus charopus Watson, 1879: synonym of Solariella charopa (Watson, 1879)
- Trochus chemnitzii Philippi, 1848: synonym of Calliostoma zizyphinum (Linnaeus, 1758)
- Trochus chinensis Philippi, 1841: synonym of Stellaria chinensis (Philippi, 1841)
- Trochus chrysolaemus Martens, 1880: synonym of Priotrochus goudoti (Fischer, 1878)
- Trochus cicatricosus Philippi, 1843: synonym of Bembicium auratum (Quoy & Gaimard, 1834)
- Trochus cicer Menke, 1844: synonym of Gibbula cicer (Menke, 1844)
- Trochus ciliaris Menke, 1843: synonym of Astele ciliaris (Menke, 1843)
- Trochus cinctus Philippi, 1836: synonym of Solariella cincta (Philippi, 1836)
- Trochus cinerarius Linnaeus, 1758: synonym of Gibbula cineraria (Linnaeus, 1758)
- Trochus cinerascens Anton, 1838: synonym of Gibbula leucophaea (Philippi, 1836)
- Trochus cinereus Blainville, 1826 non Linnaeus, 1758: synonym of Gibbula umbilicalis (da Costa, 1778)
- Trochus cingulatus Grube, 1839: synonym of Jujubinus striatus (Linnaeus, 1758)
- Trochus circulatus Anton, 1849: synonym of Euchelus circulatus (Anton, 1849)
- Trochus clanguloides Wood, 1828: synonym of Clanculus clanguloides (Wood, 1828)
- Trochus clathratus Aradas, 1847: synonym of Putzeysia wiseri (Calcara, 1842)
- Trochus clelandi W. Wood, 1828: synonym of Clelandella miliaris (Brocchi, 1814)
- Trochus clodianus Nardo, 1847: synonym of Gibbula albida (Gmelin, 1791)
- Trochus colubrinus Gould, 1849: synonym of Phorcus sauciatus (Koch, 1845)
- Trochus concameratus W. Wood, 1828: synonym of Diloma concamerata (Wood, 1828)
- Trochus concavus Gmelin, 1791: synonym of Infundibulum concavum (Gmelin, 1791)
- Trochus conchyliophorus Born, 1780: synonym of Xenophora conchyliophora (Born, 1780)
- Trochus concinnus Philippi, 1846: synonym of Trochus tubiferus Kiener, 1850
- Trochus conicus Donovan, 1803: synonym of Jujubinus striatus (Linnaeus, 1758)
- Trochus conoidalis Pease, 1868: synonym of Peasiella conoidalis (Pease, 1868)
- Trochus consors Lischke, 1872: synonym of Calliostoma consors (Lischke, 1872)
- Trochus constellatus Souverbie, 1863: synonym of Diloma constellata Souverbie, 1863
- Trochus conuloides Lamarck, 1822: synonym of Calliostoma zizyphinum (Linnaeus, 1758)
- Trochus conulus Linnaeus, 1758: synonym of Calliostoma conulus (Linnaeus, 1758)
- Trochus cookii Gmelin, 1791: synonym of Cookia sulcata (Lightfoot, 1786)
- Trochus corallinus E.A. Smith, 1875: synonym of Homalopoma amussitatum (Gould, 1861)
- Trochus corallinus Gmelin, 1791: synonym of Clanculus corallinus (Gmelin, 1791)
- Trochus corcyrensis Stossich, 1865: synonym of Phorcus articulatus (Lamarck, 1822)
- Trochus corrugata Koch, 1843: synonym of Monilea callifera (Lamarck, 1822)
- Trochus cossurensis Monterosato, 1875: synonym of Gibbula rarilineata (Michaud, 1829)
- Trochus costalis Gould, 1841: synonym of Margarites costalis (Gould, 1841)
- Trochus cranchi Leach, 1852: synonym of Calliostoma zizyphinum (Linnaeus, 1758)
- Trochus crassus (Pulteney, 1799): synonym of Osilinus lineatus (da Costa, 1778)
- Trochus creniferus Kiener: synonym of Trochus incrassatus Lamarck, 1822
- Trochus crenulatus Brocchi, 1814: synonym of Jujubinus exasperatus (Pennant, 1777)
- Trochus crispulus Philippi, 1844: synonym of Putzeysia wiseri (Calcara, 1842)
- Trochus crispus König, 1825: synonym of Xenophora (Xenophora) crispa (König, 1825)
- Trochus cruciatus Linnaeus, 1758: synonym of Clanculus cruciatus (Linnaeus, 1758)
- Trochus cruentatus Mühlfeld, 1824: synonym of Arene cruentata (Mühlfeld, 1824)
- Trochus cumingii Philippi, 1846: synonym of Tectarius cumingii (Philippi, 1846)
- Trochus cunninghami Gray, 1834: synonym of Calliostoma selectum (Dillwyn, 1817)
- Trochus cylindraceus Dillwyn, 1817: synonym of Heliacus cylindricus (Gmelin, 1791)
- Trochus cylindricus Gmelin, 1791: synonym of Heliacus cylindricus (Gmelin, 1791)
- Trochus cyrnaeus Requien, 1848: synonym of Jujubinus montagui (Wood, 1828)
- Trochus dama Philippi, 1848: synonym of Monodonta dama (Philippi, 1848)
- Trochus dejacobi Aradas & Benoit, 1841: synonym of Jujubinus exasperatus (Pennant, 1777)
- Trochus delicatulus Philippi, 1846: synonym of Coelotrochus tiaratus (Quoy & Gaimard, 1834)
- Trochus delicatus Jeffreys, 1883: synonym of Margarites luciae (G. Seguenza, 1876)
- Trochus delpretei Caramagna, 1888: synonym of Vaceuchelus delpretei (Caramagna, 1888)
- Trochus dentatus Forskål in Niebuhr, 1775: synonym of Tectus (Tectus) dentatus (Forskål in Niebuhr, 1775)
- Trochus depictus Deshayes, 1835: synonym of Jujubinus striatus (Linnaeus, 1758)
- Trochus depressus Martens, 1874: synonym of Clanculus miniatus (Anton, 1838)
- Trochus dianthus P. Fischer, 1879: synonym of Spectamen bellulum (Angas, 1869)
- Trochus diaphanus Gmelin, 1791: synonym of Calliostoma punctulatum (Martyn, 1784)
- Trochus diaphanus d'Orbigny, 1842: synonym of Vitrinella diaphana (d'Orbigny, 1842)
- Trochus dilectus Sowerby III, 1899: synonym of Pseudominolia articulata (Gould, 1861)
- Trochus diminutivus Reeve, 1862: synonym of Peasiella tantilla (Gould, 1849)
- Trochus discrepans Brown, 1818: synonym of Calliostoma zizyphinum (Linnaeus, 1758)
- Trochus divaricatus Fabricius, 1780: synonym of Lacuna vincta (Montagu, 1803)
- Trochus divaricatus Linnaeus, 1758: synonym of Gibbula divaricata (Linnaeus, 1758)
- Trochus dnopherus Watson, 1879: synonym of Margarites dnopherus (Watson, 1879)
- Trochus dolabratus Linnaeus, 1758: synonym of Pyramidella dolabrata (Linnaeus, 1758)
- Trochus drepanensis Brugnone, 1873: synonym of Gibbula drepanensis (Brugnone, 1873)
- Trochus dubius Philippi, 1844: synonym of Calliostoma conulum (Linnaeus, 1758): synonym of Calliostoma conulus (Linnaeus, 1758)
- Trochus dumerili Risso, 1826: synonym of Jujubinus exasperatus (Pennant, 1777)
- Trochus elatus Brusina, 1865: synonym of Gibbula varia (Linnaeus, 1758)
- Trochus electissimus Bean in Thorpe, 1844: synonym of Gibbula cineraria (Linnaeus, 1758)
- Trochus elegans de Blainville, 1830: synonym of Jujubinus exasperatus (Pennant, 1777)
- Trochus elegans Gmelin, 1791: synonym of Cantharidus purpureus (Gmelin, 1791)
- Trochus elegantissimus Costa O.G., 1861: synonym of Mathilda cochlaeformis Brugnone, 1873
- Trochus elongatus Wood, 1828: synonym of Tosatrochus attenuatus (Jonas, 1844)
- Trochus eltoniae Lowe, 1861: synonym of Gibbula cineraria (Linnaeus, 1758)
- Trochus episcopus Hombron & Jacquinot, 1954: synonym of Cantharidus capillaceus (Philippi, 1849)
- Trochus erithreus Brocchi, 1821: synonym of Infundibulops erithreus (Brocchi, 1821)
- Trochus erythraeus Brocchi, 1821: synonym of Infundibulops erithreus (Brocchi, 1821)
- Trochus erythreus [sic]: synonym of Infundibulops erithreus (Brocchi, 1821)
- Trochus erythroleucos Gmelin, 1791: synonym of Jujubinus exasperatus (Pennant, 1777)
- Trochus euryomphalus Jonas, 1844: synonym of Tegula euryomphala (Jonas, 1844)
- Trochus eucosmus Philippi, 1848: synonym of Trochus radiatus Gmelin, 1791
- Trochus euxinicus Andrzeiewsky, 1837: synonym of Gibbula leucophaea (Philippi, 1836)
- Trochus exasperatus Pennant, 1777: synonym of Jujubinus exasperatus (Pennant, 1777)
- Trochus excavatus Lamarck, 1822: synonym of Tegula excavata (Lamarck, 1822)
- Trochus exiguus Pulteney, 1799: synonym of Jujubinus exasperatus (Pennant, 1777)
- Trochus exilis Philippi, 1844: synonym of Dikoleps cutleriana (Clark, 1849)
- Trochus fanuloides P. Fischer, 1874: synonym of Rubritrochus pulcherrimus (A. Adams, 1855)
- Trochus fanulum Gmelin, 1791: synonym of Gibbula fanulum (Gmelin, 1791)
- Trochus fermoni Payraudeau, 1826: synonym of Gibbula ardens (Salis Marschlins, 1793)
- Trochus festivus Philippi, 1844: synonym of Trochus radiatus Gmelin, 1791
- Trochus fictilis Jonas, 1846: synonym of Trochus erithreus Brocchi, 1821
- Trochus filosus Philippi, 1844: synonym of Cantrainea peloritana (Cantraine, 1835)
- Trochus flavus Anton in Philippi, 1849: synonym of Calliostoma zizyphinum (Linnaeus, 1758)
- Trochus flosculus P. Fischer, 1878: synonym of Clanculus flosculus P. Fischer, 1880
- Trochus fonki Philippi, 1860: synonym of Calliostoma fonki (Philippi, 1860)
- Trochus formosus McAndrew & Forbes, 1847: synonym of Calliostoma occidentale (Mighels & C. B. Adams, 1842)
- Trochus forskali (Bolt.) Morch: synonym of Trochus noduliferus Lamarck, 1822
- Trochus fossulatulus Souverbie in Souverbie & Montrouzier, 1875: synonym of Hybochelus cancellatus (Krauss, 1848)
- Trochus fragilis Pulteney, 1799: synonym of Calliostoma granulatum (Born, 1778)
- Trochus fragum Philippi, 1848: synonym of Calliostoma fragum (Philippi, 1848)
- Trochus fultoni G.B. Sowerby III, 1890: synonym of Cantharidus fultoni (G. B. Sowerby III, 1890)
- Trochus fulvolabris Hmobron & Jacquinot, 1854: synonym of Coelotrochus viridis (Gmelin, 1791)
- Trochus fuscatus Gmelin, 1791: synonym of Gibbula umbilicaris (Linnaeus, 1758)
- Trochus gemmatus Gould, 1845: synonym of Euchelus gemmatus (Gould, 1845)
- Trochus gemmosus Reeve, 1842: synonym of Astele rubiginosa (Valenciennes, 1846)
- Trochus gibberosus Dillwyn, 1817: synonym of Pomaulax gibberosus (Dillwyn, 1817)
- Trochus gibbosulus Brusina, 1865: synonym of Gibbula varia (Linnaeus, 1758)
- Trochus gilberti Montrouzier in Fischer, 1878: synonym of Cantharidus polychroma (A. Adams, 1853)
- Trochus girgyllus Reeve, 1861: synonym of Bolma girgyllus (Reeve, 1861)
- Trochus glabratus Philippi, 1844: synonym of Cantrainea peloritana (Cantraine, 1835)
- Trochus gmelini Jonas, 1846: synonym of Trochus maculatus Linnaeus, 1758
- Trochus goudoti (Fischer, 1878): synonym of Priotrochus goudoti (Fischer, 1878)
- Trochus granatum Gmelin, 1791: synonym of Calliostoma tigris (Gmelin, 1791)
- Trochus grandinatus Röding, P.F., 1798: synonym of Trochus maculatus Linnaeus, 1758
- Trochus granosus Lamarck, J.B.P.A. de, 1818: synonym of Trochus maculatus Linnaeus, 1758
- Trochus granosus Martyn, 1784: synonym of Turbo granosus (Martyn, 1784)
- Trochus granulatus Born, 1778: synonym of Calliostoma granulatum (Born, 1778)
- Trochus gravesi Forbes, 1844: synonym of Jujubinus striatus (Linnaeus, 1758)
- Trochus gravinae Dautzenberg, 1881: synonym of Jujubinus gravinae (Dautzenberg, 1881)
- Trochus grayanus Philippi, 1846: synonym of Gibbula magus (Linnaeus, 1758)
- Trochus groenlandicus Gmelin, 1791: synonym of Margarites groenlandicus (Gmelin, 1791)
- Trochus gualterianus Philippi, 1848: synonym of Calliostoma gualterianum (Philippi, 1848)
- Trochus gualtierii Weinkauff, 1868: synonym of Calliostoma gualterianum (Philippi, 1848)
- Trochus guildfordiae Reeve, 1842: synonym of Guildfordia triumphans (Philippi, 1841)
- Trochus guttadauri Philippi, 1836: synonym of Gibbula guttadauri (Philippi, 1836)
- Trochus haematragus Menke, 1829: synonym of Astralium haematragum (Menke, 1829)
- Trochus hanleyanus Krauss, 1848: synonym of Trochus nigropunctatus Reeve, 1861
- Trochus helicinus (Phipps, 1774): synonym of Margarites helicinus (Phipps, 1774)
- Trochus heliotropium Martyn, 1784: synonym of Astraea heliotropium (Martyn, 1784)
- Trochus hornungi Bisacchi, 1931: synonym of Ethminolia hornungi (Bisacchi, 1931)
- Trochus horridus Costa O.G., 1861: synonym of Danilia tinei (Calcara, 1839)
- Trochus horridus Philippi, 1846: synonym of Euchelus horridus (Philippi, 1846)
- Trochus hyacinthinus de Blainville, 1830: synonym of Calliostoma laugieri (Payraudeau, 1826)
- Trochus hybridus Linnaeus, 1758: synonym of Philippia hybrida (Linnaeus, 1758)
- Trochus imperialis Gmelin, 1791: synonym of Astraea heliotropium (Martyn, 1784)
- Trochus impervius Menke, 1843: synonym of Oxystele impervia (Menke, 1843)
- Trochus incrassatus Lamarck, 1822: synonym of Trochus stellatus Gmelin, 1791
- Trochus indicus Gmelin, 1791: synonym of Onustus indicus (Gmelin, 1791)
- Trochus inflatus Blainville, 1826: synonym of Gibbula cineraria (Linnaeus, 1758)
- Trochus infundibuliformis Gmelin, 1791: synonym of Heliacus (Teretropoma) infundibuliformis infundibuliformis (Gmelin, 1791)
- Trochus infundibulum Watson, 1879: synonym of Calliotropis infundibulum (Watson, 1879)
- Trochus inornatus d'Orbigny, 1842: synonym of Episcynia inornata (d'Orbigny, 1842)
- Trochus instrictus Gould, 1849: synonym of Herpetopoma instrictum (Gould, 1849)
- Trochus intermedius Monterosato, 1872: synonym of Phorcus mutabilis (Philippi, 1846)
- Trochus interruptus Wood, 1828: synonym of Calliostoma interruptus (Wood, 1828)
- Trochus iridescens Schrenck, 1863: synonym of Lirularia iridescens (Schrenck, 1863)
- Trochus iris Gmelin, 1791: synonym of Cantharidus iris (Gmelin, 1791)
- Trochus irisodontes Quoy & Gaimard, 1834: synonym of Phasianotrochus irisodontes (Quoy & Gaimard, 1834)
- Trochus irregularis Leach, 1852: synonym of Calliostoma zizyphinum (Linnaeus, 1758)
- Trochus japonicus (Dunker, 1845): synonym of Pomaulax japonicus (Dunker, 1845)
- Trochus jonasi Philippi: synonym of Trochus maculatus Linnaeus, 1758
- Trochus jujubinus Gmelin, 1791: synonym of Calliostoma jujubinum (Gmelin, 1791)
- Trochus kochii Kiener: synonym of Trochus erithreus Brocchi, 1821
- Trochus labio Linnaeus, 1758: synonym of Monodonta labio (Linnaeus, 1758)
- Trochus laceyi (G.B. Sowerby, 1889): synonym of Clanculus miniatus (Anton, 1838)
- Trochus laevigatus Gmelin, 1791: synonym of Gibbula varia (Linnaeus, 1758)
- Trochus laevigatus Sowerby J., 1817: synonym of Calliostoma zizyphinum (Linnaeus, 1758)
- Trochus laevigatus Philippi, 1836: synonym of Calliostoma gualterianum (Philippi, 1848)
- Trochus laevissimus Martens, 1881: synonym of Ilanga laevissima (Martens, 1881)
- Trochus lamberti Souverbie, 1875: synonym of Vaceuchelus roseolus (G. Nevill & H. Nevill, 1869)
- Trochus laminarum Jeffreys, 1883: synonym of Margarites laminarum (Jeffreys, 1883)
- Trochus lapistina Philippi, 1844: synonym of Astralium latispina (Philippi, 1844)
- Trochus largillierti Philippi, 1849: synonym of Clanculus largillierti (Philippi, 1849)
- Trochus latior Monterosato, 1880: synonym of Gibbula umbilicaris (Linnaeus, 1758)
- Trochus laugieri Payraudeau, 1826: synonym of Calliostoma laugieri (Payraudeau, 1826)
- Trochus leachii Philippi, 1846: synonym of Margarites costalis (Gould, 1841)
- Trochus lehmanni Menke, 1843: synonym of Prothalotia lehmanni (Menke, 1843)
- Trochus lentiginosus Fischer: synonym of Monilea lentiginosa (A. Adams, 1853)
- Trochus lepidus Philippi, 1846: synonym of Strigosella lepida (Philippi, 1846)
- Trochus leucophaeus Philippi, 1836: synonym of Gibbula leucophaea (Philippi, 1836)
- Trochus lifuanus Fischer, 1878: synonym of Monilea lifuana (P. Fischer, 1878)
- Trochus ligulatus Menke, 1850: synonym of Tegula ligulata (Menke, 1850)
- Trochus lima Watson, 1879: synonym of Trochus rhina Watson, 1886
- Trochus lineatus da Costa, 1778: synonym of Gibbula cineraria (Linnaeus, 1758)
- Trochus lineatus Lamarck, J.B.P.A. de, 1822: synonym of Astralium haematragum (Menke, 1829)
- Trochus lineolatus O. G. Costa, 1830: synonym of Gibbula divaricata (Linnaeus, 1758)
- Trochus lineolatus Potiez & Michaud, 1838: synonym of Gibbula cineraria (Linnaeus, 1758)
- Trochus lineolatus Risso, 1826: synonym of Calliostoma zizyphinum (Linnaeus, 1758)
- Trochus listeri Kiener: synonym of Trochus kochii Philippi, 1844
- Trochus lithophorus Blumenbach, 1803: synonym of Xenophora conchyliophora (Born, 1780)
- Trochus littoralis Brusina, 1865: synonym of Jujubinus striatus (Linnaeus, 1758)
- Trochus lucidus Risso, 1826: synonym of Calliostoma conulum (Linnaeus, 1758): synonym of Calliostoma conulus (Linnaeus, 1758)
- Trochus luctuosus d'Orbigny, 1841: synonym of Tegula luctuosa (d'Orbigny, 1841)
- Trochus lugubris Gmelin, 1791: synonym of Diloma aethiops (Gmelin, 1791)
- Trochus lunaris Gmelin, 1791: synonym of Limacina retroversa (Fleming, 1823)
- Trochus luteus Quoy & Gaimard, 1834: synonym of Bembicium melanostoma (Gmelin, 1791)
- Trochus lyciacus Forbes, 1844: synonym of Gibbula albida (Gmelin, 1791)
- Trochus lyonsii Leach, 1852: synonym of Calliostoma zizyphinum (Linnaeus, 1758)
- Trochus macandreae Carpenter, 1857: synonym of Calliostoma leanum (C. B. Adams, 1852)
- Trochus maculatus Risso, 1826: synonym of Calliostoma laugieri (Payraudeau, 1826)
- Trochus maculatus verrucosus Gmelin, J.F., 1791: synonym of Trochus tubiferus Kiener, 1850
- Trochus magulus Deshayes, 1835: synonym of Gibbula albida (Gmelin, 1791)
- Trochus magus Linnaeus, 1758: synonym of Gibbula magus (Linnaeus, 1758)
- Trochus margaritarius (Philippi, 1846): synonym of Clanculus margaritarius (Philippi, 1846)
- Trochus mariei Fischer, 1886: synonym of Pagodatrochus variabilis (H. Adams, 1873)
- Trochus marmoreus Pease, 1868: synonym of Cantharidus marmoreus (Pease, 1868)
- Trochus martini Smith J., 1839: synonym of Clelandella miliaris (Brocchi, 1814)
- Trochus matoni Payraudeau, 1826: synonym of Jujubinus exasperatus (Pennant, 1777)
- Trochus mauritianus Gmelin, 1791: synonym of Tectus mauritianus (Gmelin, 1791)
- Trochus mediterraneus Wood W., 1828: synonym of Clanculus cruciatus (Linnaeus, 1758)
- Trochus melanostoma Gmelin, 1791: synonym of Bembicium melanostoma (Gmelin, 1791)
- Trochus merula Dillwyn, 1817: synonym of Oxystele merula (Dillwyn, 1817)
- Trochus metallicus Reeve, 1861: synonym of Trochus intextus Kiener, 1850
- Trochus meyeri Philippi, 1848: synonym of Astele armillata (Wood, 1828)
- Trochus michaudi de Blainville, 1830: synonym of Gibbula philberti (Récluz, 1843)
- Trochus miliaris Brocchi, 1814: synonym of Clelandella miliaris (Brocchi, 1814)
- Trochus millegranus Philippi, 1836: synonym of Clelandella miliaris (Brocchi, 1814)
- Trochus miniatus Anton, 1838: synonym of Clanculus miniatus (Anton, 1838)
- Trochus minimum Benoit, 1843: synonym of Homalopoma sanguineum (Linnaeus, 1758)
- Trochus minutulus Jeffreys, 1883: synonym of Lissotesta minima (Seguenza, 1876)
- Trochus modestus Reeve, 1843: synonym of Bolma modesta (Reeve, 1843)
- Trochus modulus Linnaeus, 1758: synonym of Modulus modulus (Linnaeus, 1758)
- Trochus mongenii Monterosato, 1872: synonym of Phorcus mutabilis (Philippi, 1846)
- Trochus montacuti Jeffreys, 1865: synonym of Jujubinus montagui (Wood, 1828)
- Trochus montagui Wood, 1828: synonym of Jujubinus montagui (Wood, 1828)
- Trochus multicolor Krauss, 1848: synonym of Gibbula multicolor (Krauss, 1848)
- Trochus multigranus Philippi, 1848: synonym of Clanculus corallinus (Gmelin, 1791)
- Trochus muricatus Linnaeus, 1758: synonym of Cenchritis muricatus (Linnaeus, 1758)
- Trochus mutabilis Philippi, 1846: synonym of Phorcus mutabilis (Philippi, 1846)
- Trochus nabateus Issel, 1869: synonym of Priotrochus obscurus obscurus (Wood, 1828)
- Trochus nanus Lamarck, 1822: synonym of Bembicium nanum (Lamarck, 1822)
- Trochus nebulosus Philippi, 1848: synonym of Gibbula umbilicaris (Linnaeus, 1758)
- Trochus neritoides Philippi, 1849: synonym of Monodonta neritoides (Philippi, 1849)
- Trochus nigerrimus Gmelin, 1791: synonym of Omphalius nigerrimus (Gmelin, 1791)
- Trochus niloticus Linnaeus, 1767: synonym of Tectus niloticus (Linnaeus, 1767)
- Trochus nobilis Philippi, 1848: synonym of Astele rubiginosa (Valenciennes, 1846)
- Trochus nucleus Philippi, 1849: synonym of Rossiteria nucleus (Philippi, 1849)
- Trochus obliquatus Gmelin, 1791: synonym of Gibbula umbilicalis (da Costa, 1778)
- Trochus obscurus Wood, 1828: synonym of Priotrochus obscurus (W. Wood, 1828)
- Trochus occidentalis Mighels & Adams, 1842: synonym of Calliostoma occidentale (Mighels & C. B. Adams, 1842)
- Trochus ochotensis Philippi, 1851: synonym of Margarites ochotensis (Philippi, 1851)
- Trochus ochraceus Philippi, 1846: synonym of Pomaulax gibberosus (Dillwyn, 1817)
- Trochus ochroleurcus [sic]: synonym of Trochus ochroleucus Gmelin, 1791
- Trochus olfersii Philippi, 1850: synonym of Lithopoma tectum (Lightfoot, 1786)
- Trochus olivaceus Anton, 1838: synonym of Gibbula adriatica (Philippi, 1844)
- Trochus ornatus Lamarck, 1822: synonym of Calliostoma ornatum (Lamarck, 1822)
- Trochus ottoi Philippi, 1844: synonym of Calliotropis ottoi (Philippi, 1844)
- Trochus pagodus Linnaeus, 1758: synonym of Tectarius pagodus (Linnaeus, 1758)
- Trochus pallidus Hombron & Jacquinot, 1854: synonym of Cantharidus purpureus (Gmelin, 1791)
- Trochus papillosum Da Costa, 1778: synonym of Calliostoma granulatum (Born, 1778)
- Trochus papillosus da Costa, 1778: synonym of Calliostoma granulatum (Born, 1778)
- Trochus parvulus Philippi, 1844: synonym of Jujubinus montagui (Wood, 1828)
- Trochus patagonicus d'Orbigny, 1835: synonym of Tegula patagonica (d'Orbigny, 1835)
- Trochus patholatus Dillwyn, 1817: synonym of Gibbula tumida (Montagu, 1803)
- Trochus pauperculus Lischke, 1872: synonym of Herpetopoma pauperculum (Lischke, 1872)
- Trochus pellucidus Valenciennes, 1846: synonym of Calliostoma pellucidum (Valenciennes, 1846)
- Trochus pennanti Philippi, 1846: synonym of Gibbula pennanti (Philippi, 1846)
- Trochus perlatus Gmelin, 1791: synonym of Modulus perlatus (Gmelin, 1791) represented as Modulus modulus (Linnaeus, 1758)
- Trochus perspectiviunculus Dillwyn, 1817: synonym of Heliacus variegatus (Gmelin, 1791)
- Trochus perspectivus Linnaeus, 1758: synonym of Architectonica perspectiva (Linnaeus, 1758)
- Trochus perversus Linnaeus, 1758: synonym of Monophorus perversus (Linnaeus, 1758)
- Trochus pharaonius Linnaeus, 1758: synonym of Clanculus pharaonius (Linnaeus, 1758)
- Trochus phasianellus (Deshayes, 1863): synonym of Calliotrochus marmoreus (Pease, 1861)
- Trochus philberti Récluz, 1843: synonym of Gibbula philberti (Récluz, 1843)
- Trochus philippensis R. B. Watson, 1881: synonym of Spectamen philippense (Watson, 1881)
- Trochus philippii Aradas, 1847: synonym of Gibbula cineraria (Linnaeus, 1758)
- Trochus pictus W. Wood, 1828: synonym of Thalotia conica (Gray, 1827)
- Trochus pictus Philippi, 1846: synonym of Gibbula spratti (Forbes, 1844)
- Trochus pileus Lamarck, 1822: synonym of Trochita pileus (Lamarck, 1822)
- Trochus piperinus Philippi, 1849: synonym of Diloma piperina (Philippi, 1849)
- Trochus planus Quoy & Gaimard, 1834: synonym of Bembicium nanum (Lamarck, 1822)
- Trochus polaris Philippi, 1846: synonym of Margarites costalis (Gould, 1841)
- Trochus ponsonbyi G.B. Sowerby, 1888: synonym of Priotrochus obscurus ponsonbyi (G. B. Sowerby, 1888)
- Trochus poupineli Montrouzier in Souverbie & Montrouzier, 1875: synonym of Calliostoma comptum A. Adams, 1855
- Trochus prodicta Fischer, 1879: synonym of Ethminolia probabilis Iredale, 1924
- Trochus profugus de Gregorio, 1889: synonym of Danilia tinei (Calcara, 1839)
- Trochus pruninus Gould, 1849: synonym of Cantharidus capillaceus (Philippi, 1849)
- Trochus pulligo Gmelin, 1791: synonym of Tegula pulligo (Gmelin, 1791)
- Trochus punctulatus Martyn, 1784: synonym of Calliostoma punctulatum (Martyn, 1784)
- Trochus puniceus (Philippi, 1846): synonym of Clanculus puniceus (Philippi, 1846)
- Trochus purpureus Risso, 1826: synonym of Clanculus cruciatus (Linnaeus, 1758)
- * Trochus pustulosus Philippi, 1849: synonym of Trochus calcaratus Souverbie in Souverbie & Montrouzier, 1875
- Trochus pyramidatus Lamarck, 1822: synonym of Jujubinus exasperatus (Pennant, 1777)
- Trochus quadricarinatus Holten, 1802: synonym of Euchelus asper (Gmelin, 1791)
- Trochus quadricostatus W. Wood, 1828: synonym of Tegula quadricostata (W. Wood, 1828)
- Trochus racketti Payraudeau, 1826: synonym of Gibbula racketti (Payraudeau, 1826)
- Trochus radians Lamarck, 1816: synonym of Trochita trochiformis (Born, 1778)
- Trochus radiatus Anton, 1838: synonym of Phorcus richardi (Payraudeau, 1826)
- Trochus rarilineatus Michaud, 1829: synonym of Gibbula rarilineata (Michaud, 1829)
- Trochus reinierius Risso, 1826: synonym of Jujubinus exasperatus (Pennant, 1777)
- Trochus rhina Watson, 1886: synonym of Calliotropis rhina (Watson, 1886)
- Trochus rhodostomus Lamarck, 1822: synonym of Astralium rhodostomum (Lamarck, 1822)
- Trochus rhysus Watson, 1879: synonym of Calliotropis rhysa (Watson, 1879)
- Trochus richardi (Payraudeau, 1826): synonym of Phorcus richardi (Payraudeau, 1826)
- Trochus rigatus Philippi, 1849: synonym of Monilea callifera (Lamarck, 1822)
- Trochus roissyi Payraudeau, 1826: synonym of Gibbula varia (Linnaeus, 1758)
- Trochus roseolus G. Nevill & H. Nevill, 1869: synonym of Vaceuchelus roseolus (G. Nevill & H. Nevill, 1869)
- Trochus roseus Salis Marschlins, 1793: synonym of Clanculus corallinus (Gmelin, 1791)
- Trochus rostratus Gmelin, 1791: synonym of Cantharidus purpureus (Gmelin, 1791)
- Trochus rotellina Gould, 1849: synonym of Camitia rotellina (Gould, 1849)
- Trochus rotularius Lamarck, 1822: synonym of Astralium rotularium (Lamarck, 1822)
- Trochus rubiginosus Valenciennes, 1846: synonym of Astele rubiginosa (Valenciennes, 1846)
- Trochus rugulosus Koch, 1848: synonym of Trochus maculatus Linnaeus, 1758
- Trochus ruscurianus Weinkauff, 1868: synonym of Jujubinus ruscurianus (Weinkauff, 1868)
- Trochus rusticus Gmelin, 1791: synonym of Omphalius rusticus (Gmelin, 1791)
- Trochus sacellus Philippi, R.A., 1854: synonym of Trochus calcaratus Souverbie in Souverbie & Montrouzier, 1875
- Trochus sagittiferus Lamarck, 1822: synonym of Phorcus sauciatus (Koch, 1845)
- Trochus sandwichiensis Souleyet, F.L.A., 1852: synonym of Trochus intextus Kiener, L.C., 1850
- Trochus sarniensis Norman, 1888: synonym of Gibbula umbilicalis (da Costa, 1778)
- Trochus sauciatus Koch, 1845: synonym of Phorcus sauciatus (Koch, 1845)
- Trochus saulcyi d'Orbigny, 1840: synonym of Phorcus sauciatus (Koch, 1845)
- Trochus scaber Linnaeus, 1758: synonym of Euchelus scaber (Linnaeus, 1758)
- Trochus scabrosus Philippi, 1850: synonym of Clanculus scabrosus (Philippi, 1850)
- Trochus scabrosus Jeffreys, 1883: synonym of Putzeysia wiseri (Calcara, 1842)
- Trochus schantaricus Middendorff, 1849: synonym of Margarites schantaricus (Middendorff, 1849)
- Trochus scrobiculatus Souverbie & Montrouzier, 1866: synonym of Vaceuchelus clathratus (A. Adams, 1853)
- Trochus scrobiculatus Souverbie, 1886: synonym of Vaceuchelus scrobiculatus (Souverbie, 1866)
- Trochus selectus Dillwyn, 1817: synonym of Calliostoma selectum (Dillwyn, 1817)
- Trochus semicostatus Kiener, 1850: synonym of Astralium semicostatum (Kiener, 1850)
- Trochus semiglobosus Aradas, 1847: synonym of Gibbula pennanti (Philippi, 1846)
- Trochus semistriatus d'Orbigny, 1842: synonym of Teinostoma semistriatum (d'Orbigny, 1842)
- Trochus seriatus Megerle von Mühlfeld, 1824: synonym of Monophorus perversus (Linnaeus, 1758)
- Trochus seriopunctatus de Blainville, 1830: synonym of Calliostoma laugieri (Payraudeau, 1826)
- Trochus shinagawaensis Tokunaga, 1906: synonym of Calliostoma shinagawaense (Tokunaga, 1906)
- Trochus signatus Jonas, 1844: synonym of Priotrochus obscurus obscurus (Wood, 1828)
- Trochus sinensis Gmelin, 1791: synonym of Oxystele sinensis (Gmelin, 1791)
- Trochus sismondae Issel, 1869: synonym of Peasiella isseli (Semper in Issel, 1869)
- Trochus smaragdinus Monterosato, 1880: synonym of Jujubinus striatus (Linnaeus, 1758)
- Trochus smaragdus Reeve, 1862: synonym of Trochus maculatus Linnaeus, 1758
- Trochus smithi Wood, 1828: synonym of Monilea smithi (Wood, 1828)
- Trochus socius Fischer P., 1895: synonym of Jujubinus exasperatus (Pennant, 1777)
- Trochus solaris Linnaeus, 1764: synonym of Stellaria solaris (Linnaeus, 1764)
- Trochus solaris Brocchi, 1814: synonym of Bolma rugosa (Linnaeus, 1767)
- Trochus solidus Jonas: synonym of Trochus firmus Philippi, 1849
- Trochus splendidus Philippi, 1855: synonym of Astele rubiginosa (Valenciennes, 1846)
- Trochus spongiarum Bucquoy, Dautzenberg & Dollfus, 1885: synonym of Calliostoma laugieri (Payraudeau, 1826)
- Trochus spratti Forbes, 1844: synonym of Gibbula spratti (Forbes, 1844)
- Trochus spurcus Gould, 1856: synonym of Gibbula spurca (Gould, 1856)
- Trochus squamiferus Koch, 1844: synonym of Bellastraea squamifera (Koch, 1844)
- Trochus stellaris Röding, 1798: synonym of Trochus stellatus Gmelin, 1791
- Trochus stenomphalus G. B. Sowerby III, 1890: synonym of Jujubinus suarezensis fultoni (G. B. Sowerby III, 1890) †
- Trochus stramineus Gmelin, 1791: synonym of Heliacus (Grandeliacus) stramineus (Gmelin, 1791)
- Trochus striatulus Garrett, 1857: synonym of Calliotrochus marmoreus (Pease, 1861)
- Trochus striatus (Linnaeus, 1758): synonym of Jujubinus striatus (Linnaeus, 1758)
- Trochus strigosus Gmelin, 1791: synonym of Gibbula cineraria (Linnaeus, 1758)
- Trochus suavis Philippi, 1850: synonym of Pictodiloma suavis (Philippi, 1850)
- Trochus subcarinatus (Swainson, 1855): synonym of Astele subcarinata Swainson, 1855
- Trochus subviridis Philippi, 1848: synonym of Trochus nigropunctatus Reeve, 1861
- Trochus succinctus Monterosato, 1880: synonym of Gibbula ardens (Salis Marschlins, 1793)
- Trochus sulcatus Gmelin, 1791: synonym of Cookia sulcata (Lightfoot, 1786)
- Trochus sulcatus Martyn, 1784: synonym of Cookia sulcata (Lightfoot, 1786)
- Trochus surgillatus Reeve, 1861: synonym of Trochus radiatus Gmelin, 1791
- Trochus suturalis Philippi, 1836: synonym of Callumbonella suturalis (Philippi, 1836)
- Trochus tampaensis Conrad, 1846: synonym of Calliostoma tampaense (Conrad, 1846)
- Trochus tamsii Dunker in Philippi, 1845: synonym of Phorcus atratus (Wood, 1828)
- Trochus tantillus Gould, 1849: synonym of Peasiella tantilla (Gould, 1849)
- Trochus tectum Gmelin, 1791: synonym of Modulus tectum (Gmelin, 1791)
- Trochus tectumchinense Noodt, 1819: synonym of Pomaulax gibberosus (Dillwyn, 1817)
- Trochus tectus Lightfoot, 1786: synonym of Lithopoma tectum (Lightfoot, 1786)
- Trochus tenebricus Reeve, 1861: synonym of Trochus intextus Kiener, 1850
- Trochus tentoriiformis Jonas, 1845: synonym of Astralium tentoriiforme (Jonas, 1845)
- Trochus tentorium Gmelin, 1791: synonym of Tectus tentorium (Gmelin, 1791)
- Trochus tenuis Montagu, 1803: synonym of Calliostoma granulatum (Born, 1778)
- Trochus tessulatus Born, 1778: synonym of Phorcus turbinatus (Born, 1778)
- Trochus tetragonostoma Jordan, 1895: synonym of Callumbonella suturalis (Philippi, 1836)
- Trochus textilis Reeve, 1861: synonym of Trochus nigropunctatus Reeve, 1861
- Trochus texturatus Gould, 1849: synonym of Cantharidus purpureus (Gmelin, 1791)
- Trochus tiaratus Quoy & Gaimard, 1834: synonym of Coelotrochus tiaratus (Quoy & Gaimard, 1834)
- Trochus tiberianus Crosse, 1863: synonym of Cantharidella tiberiana (Crosse, 1863)
- Trochus tigrinus Anton, 1838: synonym of Oxystele tigrina (Anton, 1838)
- Trochus tigris Gmelin, 1791: synonym of Calliostoma tigris (Gmelin, 1791)
- Trochus tornatus Röding, 1798: synonym of Calliostoma tornatum (Röding, 1798)
- Trochus torosus Kiener, 1850: synonym of Cantharidus purpureus (Gmelin, 1791)
- Trochus torquatus Anton in Philippi, 1848: synonym of Calliostoma pellucidum (Valenciennes, 1846)
- Trochus tranquebaricus Röding, 1798: synonym of Calliostoma tranquebaricum (Röding, 1798)
- Trochus tricarinatus Lamarck, 1818: synonym of Euchelus asper (Gmelin, 1791)
- Trochus tricolor Risso, 1826: synonym of Jujubinus exasperatus (Pennant, 1777)
- Trochus trisulcatus Forsskål in Niebuhr, 1775: synonym of Terebralia palustris (Linnaeus, 1767)
- Trochus triumphans Philippi, 1841: synonym of Guildfordia triumphans (Philippi, 1841)
- Trochus tuber Linnaeus, 1758: synonym of Lithopoma tuber (Linnaeus, 1758)
- Trochus tuberculatus da Costa, 1778: synonym of Gibbula magus (Linnaeus, 1758)
- Trochus tuberculatus Risso, 1826: synonym of Gibbula fanulum (Gmelin, 1791)
- Trochus tuberculosus d'Orbigny, 1842: synonym of Parviturbo tuberculosus (d'Orbigny, 1842)
- Trochus tubifer [sic]: synonym of Trochus tubiferus Kiener, 1850
- Trochus tumidulus Nardo, 1847: synonym of Jujubinus montagui (Wood, 1828)
- Trochus tumidulus Aradas, 1846: synonym of Jujubinus tumidulus (Aradas, 1846)
- Trochus tumidus Montagu, 1803: synonym of Gibbula tumida (Montagu, 1803)
- Trochus turbiformis Salis Marschlins, 1793: synonym of Phorcus articulatus (Lamarck, 1822)
- Trochus turbinatus Born, 1778: synonym of Osilinus turbinatus (Born, 1778)
- Trochus turbinoides Deshayes, 1835: synonym of Gibbula turbinoides (Deshayes, 1835)
- Trochus umbilicalis da Costa, 1778: synonym of Gibbula umbilicalis (da Costa, 1778)
- Trochus umbilicaris Linnaeus, 1758: synonym of Gibbula umbilicaris (Linnaeus, 1758)
- Trochus umbilicatus Montagu, 1803: synonym of Gibbula umbilicalis (da Costa, 1778)
- Trochus undosus W. Wood, 1828: synonym of Megastraea undosa (W. Wood, 1828)
- Trochus undulatus Risso, 1826: synonym of Gibbula fanulum (Gmelin, 1791)
- Trochus unguis W. Wood, 1828: synonym of Uvanilla unguis (W. Wood, 1828)
- Trochus unicus Dunker, 1860: synonym of Calliostoma unicum (Dunker, 1860)
- Trochus unidentatus Philippi, 1844: synonym of Jujubinus unidentatus (Philippi, 1844)
- Trochus vaillanti P. Fisher, 1882: synonym of Solariella vaillanti (P. Fischer, 1882)
- Trochus varians O. G. Costa, 1830: synonym of Gibbula divaricata (Linnaeus, 1758)
- Trochus varians Deshayes, 1835: synonym of Gibbula adriatica (Philippi, 1844)
- Trochus variegatus Gmelin, 1791: synonym of Heliacus (Heliacus) variegatus (Gmelin, 1791)
- Trochus varius Linnaeus, 1758: synonym of Gibbula varia (Linnaeus, 1758)
- Trochus venosus Megerle von Mühlfeld, 1816: synonym of Jujubinus unidentatus (Philippi, 1844)
- Trochus vernus Gmelin, J.F., 1791: synonym of Trochus maculatus Linnaeus, 1758
- Trochus verrucosus Gmelin, 1791: synonym of Trochus maculatus Linnaeus, 1758
- Trochus vestiarius Linnaeus, 1758: synonym of Umbonium vestiarium (Linnaeus, 1758)
- Trochus vieillioti (Payraudeau, 1826): synonym of Clanculus cruciatus (Linnaeus, 1758)
- Trochus villicus Philippi, 1844: synonym of Gibbula philberti (Récluz, 1843)
- Trochus violaceus Risso, 1826: synonym of Calliostoma conulum (Linnaeus, 1758): synonym of Calliostoma conulus (Linnaeus, 1758)
- Trochus virgatus Gmelin, 1791: synonym of Tectus virgatus (Gmelin, 1791)
- Trochus viridis Gmelin, 1791: synonym of Coelotrochus viridis (Gmelin, 1791)
- Trochus viridulus Gmelin, 1791: synonym of Tegula viridula (Gmelin, 1791)
- Trochus vividus Reeve, 1861 : synonym of Trochus radiatus Gmelin, 1791
- Trochus vulgaris Risso, 1826: synonym of Jujubinus exasperatus (Pennant, 1777)
- Trochus wilsi Pickery, 1989: synonym of Trochus cariniferus Reeve, 1842
- Trochus wiseri Calcara, 1842: synonym of Putzeysia wiseri (Calcara, 1842)
- Trochus yokohamensis Bock, 1878: synonym of Kanekotrochus infuscatus (Gould, 1861)
- Trochus zelandicus Quoy & Gaimard, 1834: synonym of Diloma zelandica (Quoy & Gaimard, 1834)
- Trochus ziczac Gmelin, 1791: synonym of Echinolittorina ziczac (Gmelin, 1791)
- Trochus zizyphinus Linnaeus, 1758: synonym of Calliostoma zizyphinum (Linnaeus, 1758)
- Trochus zonatus Jeffreys, 1856: synonym of Phorcus turbinatus (Born, 1778)
- Trochus (Collonia) verruca Gould, 1845: synonym of Collonista verruca (Gould, 1845)

The following species are nomina dubia (names of unknown or doubtful application):

- Trochus bicinctus Philippi, 1849
- Trochus quadricinctus Mühlfeld, 1824

Species inquirenda

- Trochus artensis P. Fischer, 1878
- Trochus fabrei Montrouzier in Fischer, 1878
- Trochus gradatus A. A. Gould, 1849
- Trochus incarnatus Philippi, 1846
- Trochus pulchellus Philippi, 1846
- Trochus reevei Montrouzier in Souverbie & Montrouzier, 1866
- Trochus rhodomphalus Souverbie in Souverbie & Montrouzier, 1875
- Trochus saga Philippi, 1846
- Trochus scrobiculatus Souverbie in Souverbie & Montrouzier, 1866
- Trochus sublaevis Geinitz, 1842
- Trochus subviridis Philippi, 1848
