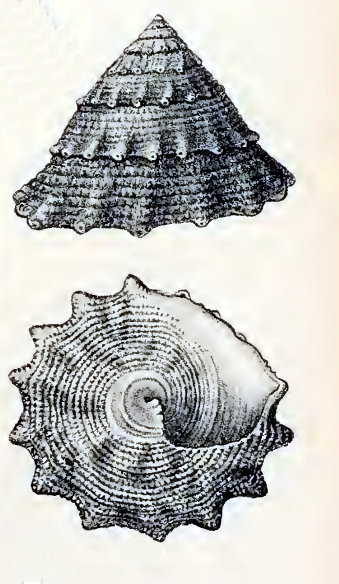
- Drawing showing two views of a shell of Trochus tubiferus

Scientific classification
- Kingdom: Animalia
- Phylum: Mollusca
- Class: Gastropoda
- Subclass: Vetigastropoda
- Order: Trochida
- Superfamily: Trochoidea
- Family: Trochidae
- Genus: Trochus
- Species: T. tubiferus

Binomial name
- Trochus tubiferus Kiener, 1850

Synonyms
- Polydonta squamigera A. Adams, 1851; Trochus maculatus verrucosus Gmelin, J.F., 1791; Trochus obesus Reeve; Trochus tubifer [sic] (misspelling)

= Trochus tubiferus =

Species of gastropod

Trochus tubiferus is a species of sea snail, a marine gastropod mollusk in the family Trochidae, the top snails.

== Description ==
The height of the shell attains 35 mm, its diameter 36 mm. The false-unibilicate, solid, thick shell has a conical shape. The spire shows rectilinear or slightly convex outlines. The about 9 whorls are planulate or a little concave. The body whorl is carinated and spinose at the periphery. The color of the shell is above grayish, maculated with purplish brown and faint green. The base of the shell is radiately striped, lineolate or maculate with brown. The upper surface of the whorls is closely granulose, and each whorl bears at its periphery about 17 radiating perforated short spines. The base is slightly convex, with 10 to 12 narrow closely granulose concentric lirae. The aperture is white within. The outer and parietal walls are strongly lirate. The parietal wall has the same color as the base, but overlaid with a white callus. The basal margin is straight, very thick, and dentate. The columella oblique. Its edge is convex, quadri-dentate, and within spirally plicate. The umbilical area is white, funnel-shaped, callous, rather narrow, and obsoletely spirally costate.

The numerous lirae of the base separate this form from Trochus calcaratus Souverbie in Souverbie & Montrouzier, 1875, with which it agrees in the perforated or fistulose spines. These are sometimes subobsolete, and frequently solid on the body whorl.

== Distribution ==
This marine species occurs in the Indian Ocean off Madagascar.
