= Trochus firmus =

Scientific classification
- Kingdom: Animalia
- Phylum: Mollusca
- Class: Gastropoda
- Subclass: Vetigastropoda
- Order: Trochida
- Superfamily: Trochoidea
- Family: Trochidae
- Genus: Trochus
- Species: T. firmus

Binomial name
- Trochus firmus Philippi, 1849

Synonyms
- Trochus solidus Jonas; Trochus (Infundibulops) firmus Philippi, 1849

Species of gastropod

Trochus firmus is a species of sea snail, a marine gastropod mollusk in the family Trochidae, the top snails.

== Description ==
The size of the adult shell varies between 20 and 26 mm (0.79 and 1.02 in). The notably thick, solid shell has a rather conical shape. It is transversely sulcate. It has a pale green ground, painted with close purple-red streaks above. The base has red-spotted girdles. The whorls are a little subangular above the suture and a little plicate below the sutures, appearing somewhat terraced. The body whorl is rounded-angulate and passes into the base with a blunt angle. The sculpture consists of about seven weak smooth transverse grooves on the upper surface, and about four scarcely elevated concentric girdles on the base. The base of the shell is nearly plane, obsoletely cingulate and false-umbilicate. The funnel-shaped pit occupying the place of the umbilicus has a slightly elevated liration. The aperture is rhomboidal. The entirely simple columella is very oblique.

== Distribution ==
This marine species occurs in the Persian Gulf.
