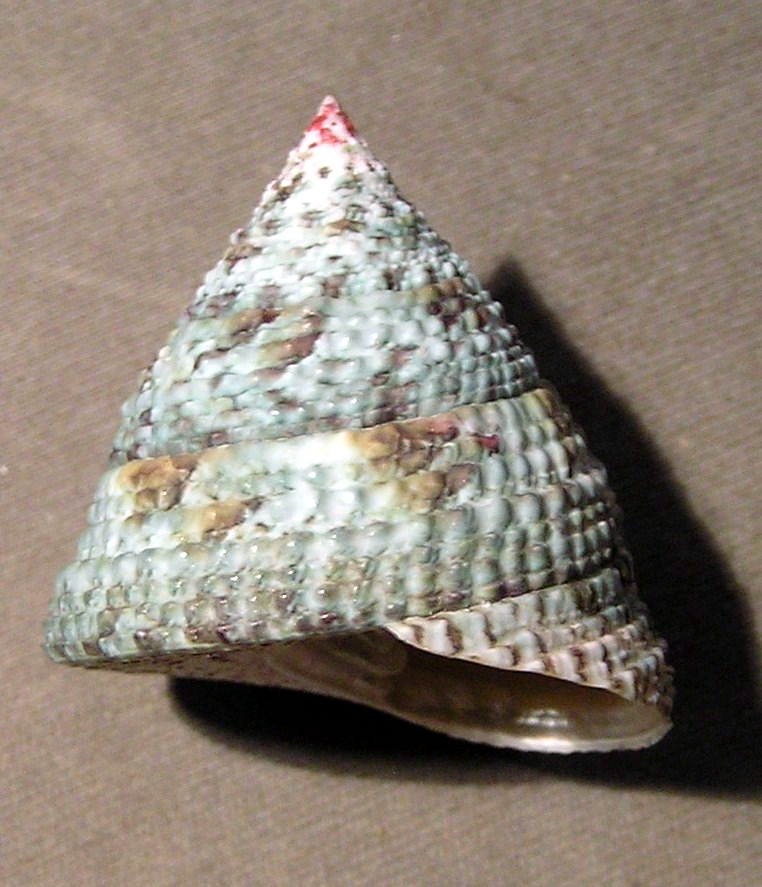
- Apertural view of a shell of Trochus nigropunctatus

Scientific classification
- Kingdom: Animalia
- Phylum: Mollusca
- Class: Gastropoda
- Subclass: Vetigastropoda
- Order: Trochida
- Superfamily: Trochoidea
- Family: Trochidae
- Genus: Trochus
- Species: T. nigropunctatus

Binomial name
- Trochus nigropunctatus Reeve, 1861

Synonyms
- Trochus (Infundibulum) nigropunctatus Reeve, 1861; Trochus (Polydonta) nigropunctatus Reeve, 1861; Trochus (Trochus) nigropunctatus Reeve, 1861; Trochus engainus Philippi; Trochus hanleyanus Krauss, 1848; Trochus subviridis Philippi, 1848; Trochus textilis Reeve, 1861

= Trochus nigropunctatus =

Species of gastropod

Trochus nigropunctatus, common name the black-spotted topshell, is a species of sea snail, a marine gastropod mollusk in the family Trochidae, the top snails.

== Description ==
The shell is rather largely, excavately umbilicated, and shortly conical. Its color is ashgreen, obliquely flamed with black. The whorls are flatly convex, spirally very closely gemmed with regular grains. The base is grain-ridged. The interstices are crispately decussated with ridges dotted with black. The dots are conspicuous, distant.

The surface of this species is grained with unusual regularity, and the base is very characteristically sprinkled at rather distant intervals with blue-black dots.

== Distribution ==
This marine species occurs off Indo-Malaysia, Oceania, the Philippines, and Australia (Northern Territory, Queensland, Western Australia)
