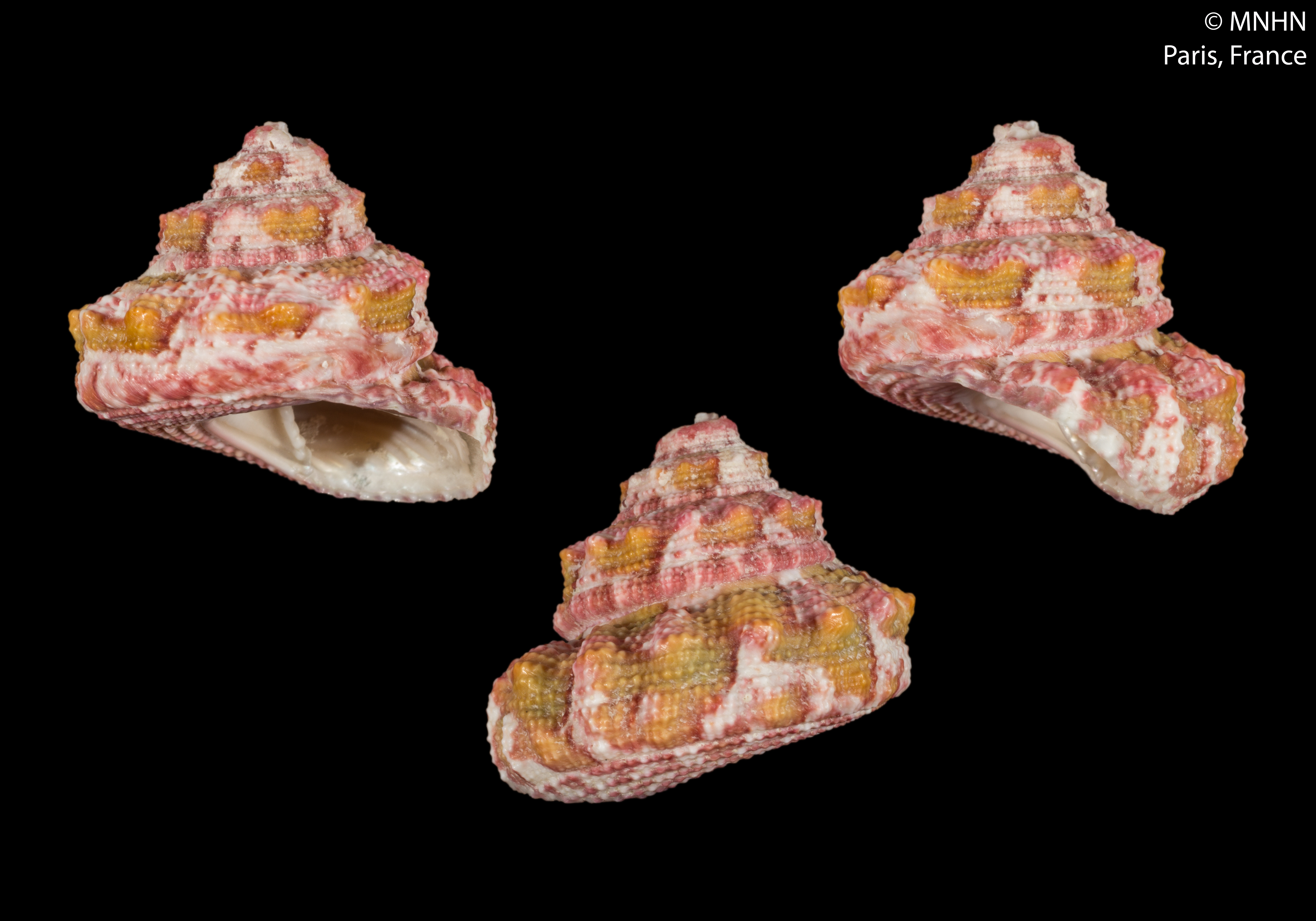
- Shell of Trochus ferreirai (holotype at MNHN, Paris)

Scientific classification
- Kingdom: Animalia
- Phylum: Mollusca
- Class: Gastropoda
- Subclass: Vetigastropoda
- Order: Trochida
- Superfamily: Trochoidea
- Family: Trochidae
- Genus: Trochus
- Species: T. ferreirai

Binomial name
- Trochus ferreirai Bozzetti, 1996

Synonyms
- Clanculus nodulosus A. Adams, 1855

= Trochus ferreirai =

Species of gastropod

Trochus ferreirai is a species of sea snail, a marine gastropod mollusk in the family Trochidae, the top snails.

== Description ==
The size of the shell varies between 20 mm and 26 mm. It is a deposit feeder and grazer.

== Distribution ==
This marine species occurs off the Philippines.
