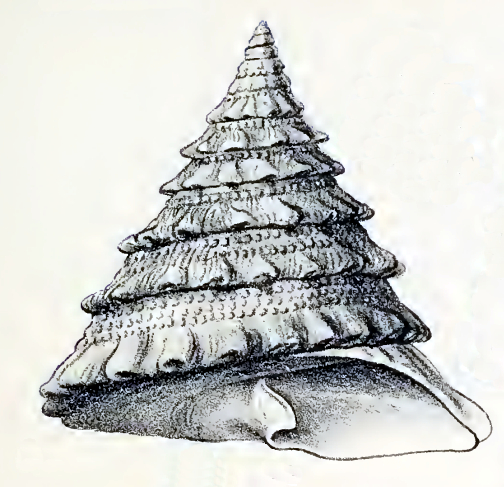
- Apertural view of a shell of Trochus noduliferus

Scientific classification
- Kingdom: Animalia
- Phylum: Mollusca
- Class: Gastropoda
- Subclass: Vetigastropoda
- Order: Trochida
- Superfamily: Trochoidea
- Family: Trochidae
- Genus: Trochus
- Species: T. noduliferus

Binomial name
- Trochus noduliferus Lamarck, 1822

Synonyms
- Trochus forskali (Bolt.) Morch

= Trochus noduliferus =

Species of gastropod

Trochus noduliferus is a species of sea snail, a marine gastropod mollusk in the family Trochidae, the top snails.

== Description ==
The height of the shell attains 70 mm, its diameter 75 mm. The large, ponderous, solid, imperforate shell has a conical shape. The about 12 whorls are planulate above, prominently knobbed around the sutures and the periphery. The tubercles number about fifteen on the body whorl. There is usually visible a secondary sculpture of fine subobsolete radiating wrinkles. The flat base of the shell is very obsoletely lirate, smooth, and polished. It is white or tinged with green around the central portion. The aperture is smooth within. The columellar fold is strong, heavy, and directed downward. The colorof the shell is pinkish, more or less mottled with rose. Old specimens are uniform grayish.

== Distribution ==
This species occurs in the Red Sea.
