= Trochus ochroleucus =

- Five views of a shell of Trochus ochroleucus

Scientific classification
- Kingdom: Animalia
- Phylum: Mollusca
- Class: Gastropoda
- Subclass: Vetigastropoda
- Order: Trochida
- Superfamily: Trochoidea
- Family: Trochidae
- Genus: Trochus
- Species: T. ochroleucus

Binomial name
- Trochus ochroleucus Gmelin, 1791

Synonyms
- Trochus ochroleurcus [sic] (misspelling)

Species of gastropod

Trochus ochroleucus, common name the yellow-mouth top shell, is a species of sea snail, a marine gastropod mollusk in the family Trochidae, the top snails.

== Description ==
The size of an adult shell varies between 15 mm and 35 mm. The umbilicate shell has a conoidal shape. The color is isabella-yellow. It is sculptured with very fine subgranose lirae, about 11 on penultimate whorl, 40 on the body whorl. The whorls are rather convex, the body whorl scarcely angled. The margin of the umbilicus is dentate. The columella is very oblique, not solute above and terminates below in a simple denticle. The lip is thickened and corrugated within. The form is just like Clanculus cruciatus (Linnaeus, 1758). The shell consists of 6 to 7 rather rounded whorls, the body whorl not angulated to speak of, and with a rather convex base. The spiral cinguli gradually increase in number, so that on the penultimate whorl there are about 11, on the body whorl about 40 of them. On the upper whorls they are distinctly granulose, on the last almost entirely smooth. The umbilicus is pretty narrow, its margin dentate. The columella is very oblique, not free above, with a small but prominent denticle below. The outer lip is thickened within, with five folds, but near the edge with numerous wrinkles.

== Distribution ==
This species occurs in the Indian Ocean, and in the Pacific Ocean off the Philippines
