= Trochus fultoni =

Scientific classification
- Kingdom: Animalia
- Phylum: Mollusca
- Class: Gastropoda
- Subclass: Vetigastropoda
- Order: Trochida
- Superfamily: Trochoidea
- Family: Trochidae
- Genus: Trochus
- Species: T. fultoni

Binomial name
- Trochus fultoni Melvill, 1898

Synonyms
- Cantharidus fultoni (Melvill, 1898); Trochus (Infundibulops) fultoni Melvill, 1898

Species of gastropod

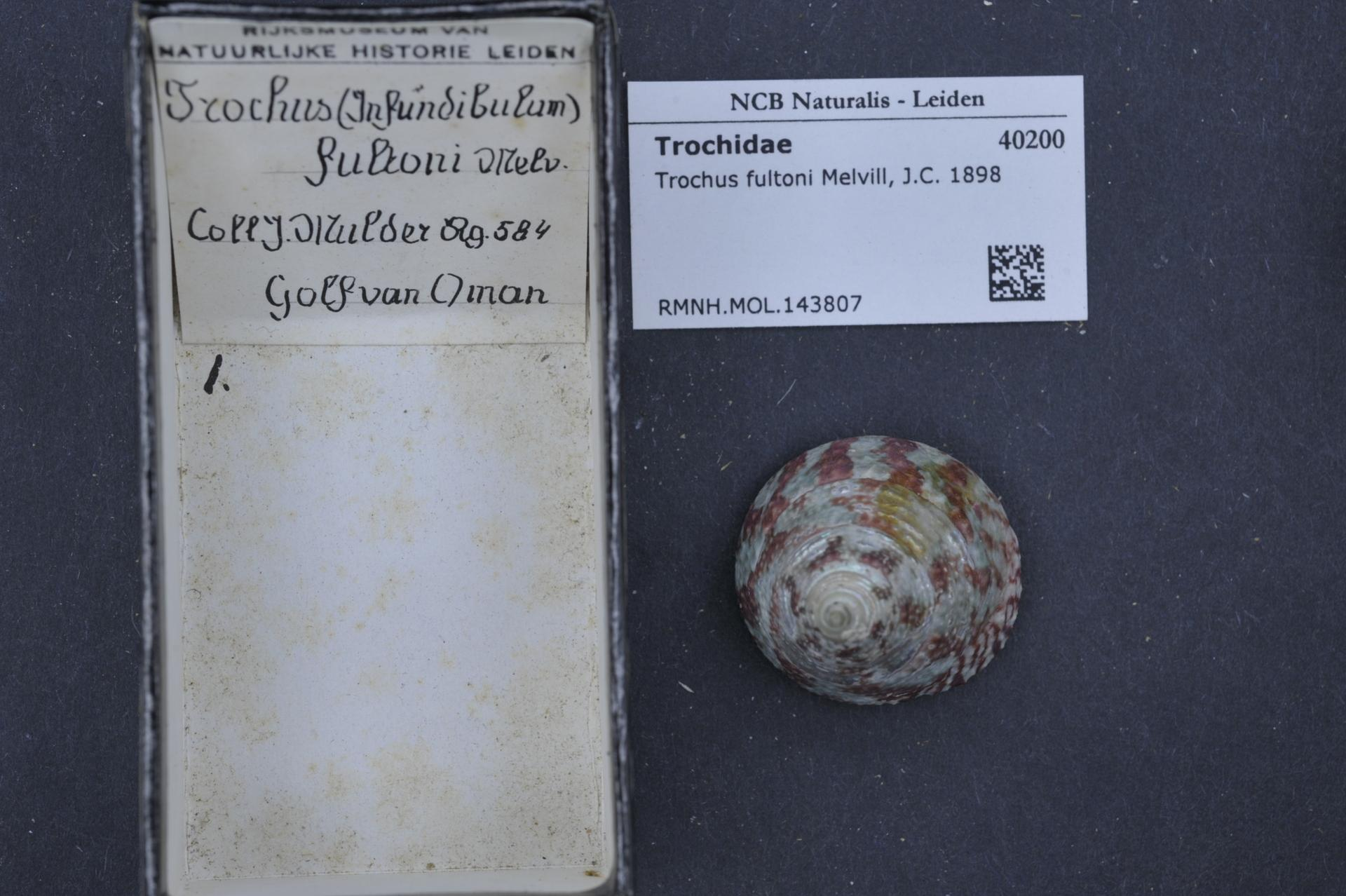

Trochus fultoni is a species of sea snail, a marine gastropod mollusk in the family Trochidae, the top snails.

Trochus fultoni Melvill, 1898, which is currently in use for a species from the Gulf of Oman is a junior homonym of Trochus fultoni G.B. Sowerby III, 1890 (which has become a synonym of † Jujubinus suarezensis fultoni (G.B. Sowerby III, 1890), described from South Africa.

== Distribution ==
This marine species occurs in the Gulf of Oman and off Kuwait (intertidal zone of Ras Al-Zour).
