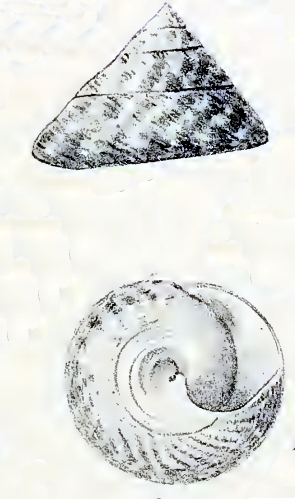
- Drawing showing two views of a shell of Trochus kochii

Scientific classification
- Kingdom: Animalia
- Phylum: Mollusca
- Class: Gastropoda
- Subclass: Vetigastropoda
- Order: Trochida
- Superfamily: Trochoidea
- Family: Trochidae
- Genus: Trochus
- Species: T. kochii

Binomial name
- Trochus kochii Philippi, 1844

Synonyms
- Infundibulops kochii (Philippi, 1844); Trochus (Infundibulum) kochi Philippi, 1844 (original description); Trochus listeri Kiener

= Trochus kochii =

Species of gastropod

Trochus kochii is a species of sea snail, a marine gastropod mollusk in the family Trochidae, the top snails.

== Description ==
The height of the shell attains 32 mm, its diameter 38 mm. The broad, rather solid shell has a conical shape. The spire is conic. The apex is generally eroded, corneous (orange colored). There are about 7 whorls, which are slightly convex. The shells are whitish, painted with oblique flexuose (angular brownish-green) radiating stripes. Nearly the whole surface can be suffused with bright green by the erosion of the outer layer. The sculpture consists of inconspicuous incremental striae and very oblique subobsolete folds. The flat base of the shell is very obsoletely lirate. Its middle portion (umbilical tract) is excavated, concave, strongly spirally grooved. The sculpture does not extend into the aperture nor to the edge of the columella, which is nacreous. The large aperture is very oblique, very iridescent and neither lirate nor toothed within. The basal lips and columella are simple, forming a regular curve. The columella shows a strong dentiform fold above. The green parietal wall is eroded and, nearly smooth.

== Distribution ==
This marine species occurs off South Africa.
