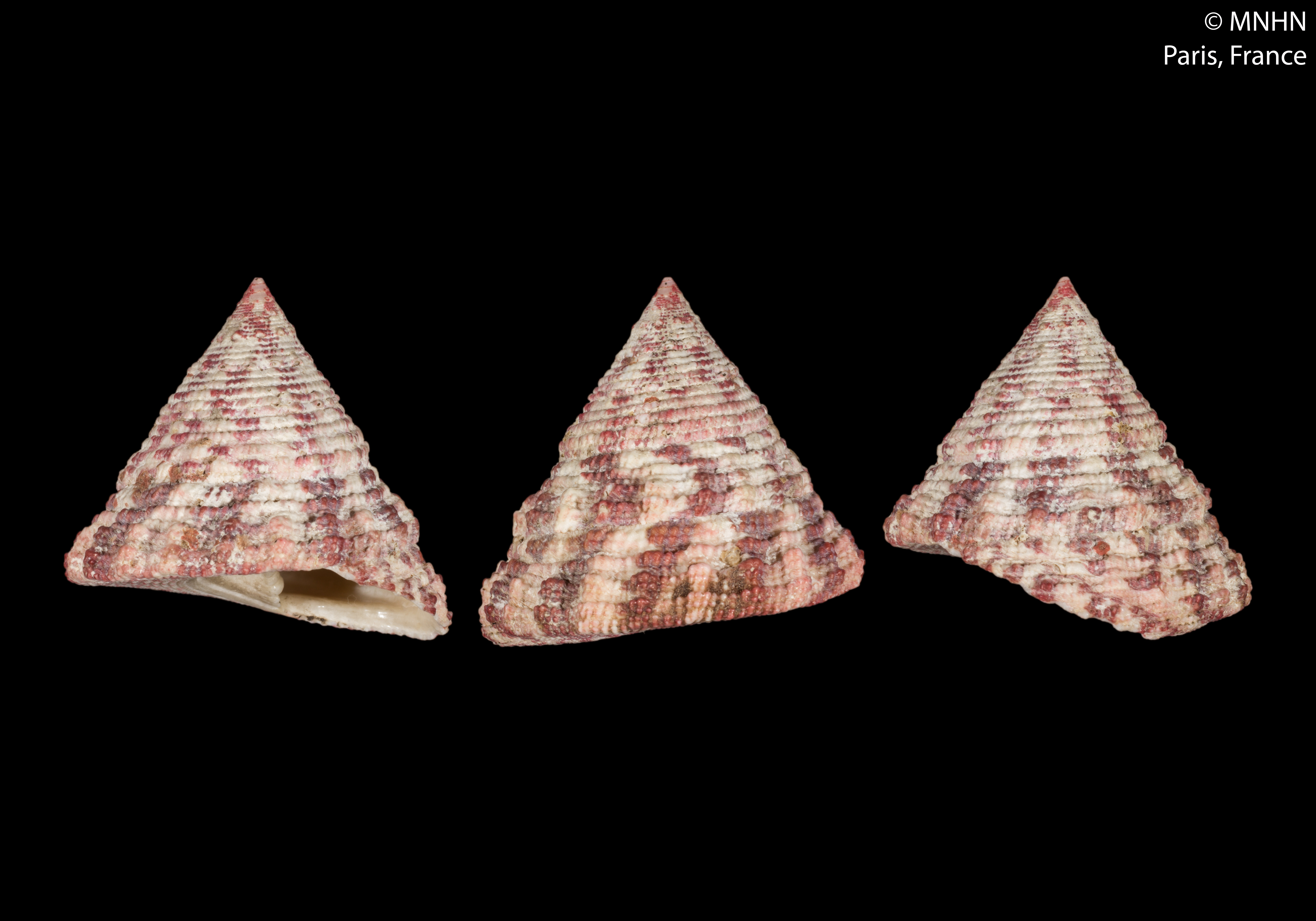
- Shell of Trochus subincarnatus (syntype at MNHN, Paris)

Scientific classification
- Kingdom: Animalia
- Phylum: Mollusca
- Class: Gastropoda
- Subclass: Vetigastropoda
- Order: Trochida
- Superfamily: Trochoidea
- Family: Trochidae
- Genus: Trochus
- Species: T. subincarnatus

Binomial name
- Trochus subincarnatus P. Fischer, 1879

= Trochus subincarnatus =

Species of gastropod

Trochus subincarnatus is a species of sea snail, a marine gastropod mollusk in the family Trochidae, the top snails.

== Description ==
The height of the shell attains 32 mm, its diameter 39 mm. This species is allied to Trochus maculatus Linnaeus, 1758 but differs in the following characters: the form is more conic, the body whorl is less convex and less elevated. The spiral lirae on the inferior part of the body whorl are less conspicuous. The longitudinal folds are strongly developed, rendering the periphery dentate; Trochus incarnatus Philippi, 1846 (a taxon inquirendum) differs from this species in being less conical, smaller, more elongate, with fewer lirae on the base (7 or 8 instead of 12), etc.

== Distribution ==
This species occurs in the Indian Ocean off Madagascar.
