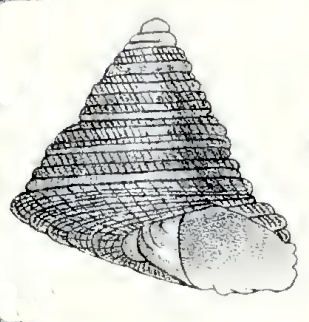
- Drawing with an apertural view of a shell of Trochus camelophorus

Scientific classification
- Kingdom: Animalia
- Phylum: Mollusca
- Class: Gastropoda
- Subclass: Vetigastropoda
- Order: Trochida
- Superfamily: Trochoidea
- Family: Trochidae
- Genus: Trochus
- Species: T. camelophorus

Binomial name
- Trochus camelophorus Webster, 1906

Synonyms
- Trochus (Camelotrochus) camelophorus Webster, 1906

= Trochus camelophorus =

Species of sea snail

Trochus camelophorus is a species of small sea snail, a marine gastropod mollusc in the family Trochidae, the top snails.

== Description ==
The height of the shell attains 11 mm, its diameter 12 mm. The solid, false-umbilicate, pink shell has a conical shape. Its sculpture shows rounded cinguli of unequal thickness, with rope-like markings, 5 to 6 on the penultimate whorl. Regular radiate riblets cross the cinguli. slightly beading or granulating them. The base of the shell contains 5 to 6 flat spiral ribs, separated by slightly narrower furrows The whole is ornamented with close and fine radiate striae. The colour of the shell is rose, with darker markings above the periphery of the body whorl. The base is yellowish-white, with radiate stripes and spots of light brown. The conical spire has a rounded apex. The protoconch contains two whorls with traces of a spiral sculpture. The five whorls of the teleoconch are slightly shouldered above, flat, the last one sharply angled at the periphery. The suture is marked by a deep groove behind the first roping of succeeding whorl. The aperture is subquadrangular, inside slightly pearly.. The outer and basal lip are slightly convex, forming an acute angle at their junction. The columella is slightly oblique, with a distinct fold above, rounded, and smooth. The false umbilicus is not very deep, and has a strong spiral fold, which is sometimes distinctly grooved, thus having the appearance of two spiral ribs lying close together.

== Distribution ==
This marine species is endemic to New Zealand, known from the northern end of North Island.
