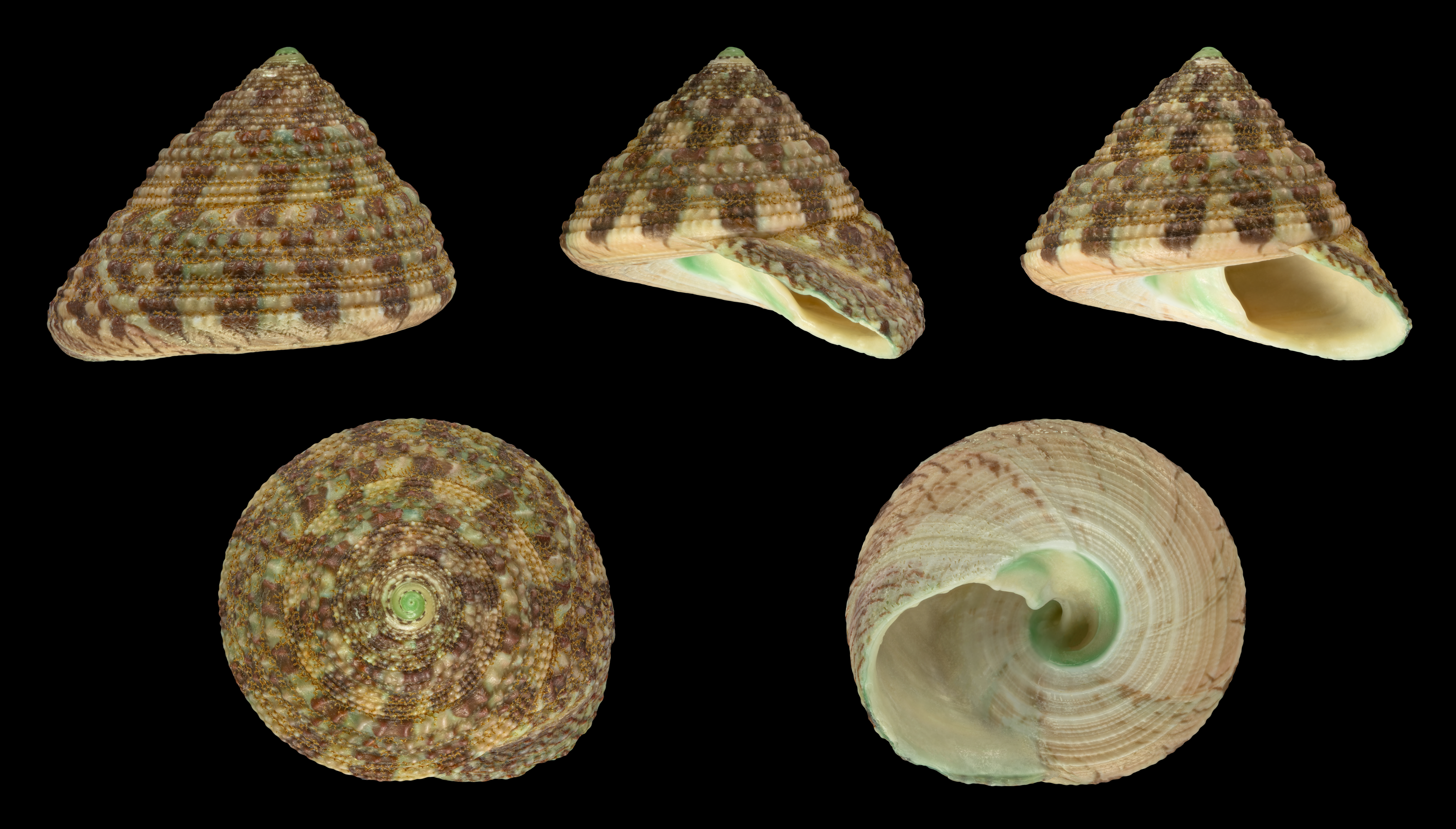
- Drawing with two views of a shell of Trochus chloromphalus

Scientific classification
- Kingdom: Animalia
- Phylum: Mollusca
- Class: Gastropoda
- Subclass: Vetigastropoda
- Order: Trochida
- Superfamily: Trochoidea
- Family: Trochidae
- Genus: Trochus
- Species: T. chloromphalus

Binomial name
- Trochus chloromphalus (A. Adams, 1851)

Synonyms
- Infundibulum chloromphalus A. Adams, 1851

= Trochus chloromphalus =

Species of sea snail in the family Trochidae

Trochus chloromphalus is a species of small sea snail, a marine gastropod mollusc in the family Trochidae, the top snails.

== Description ==
The height of the shell attains 19 mm, its diameter 22 mm. The thick, false-umbilicate shell has a conoid shape with an acute apex. It contains eight whorls, the first yellowish, the following planulate, greenish, ornamented with flexuous brown lines. They are separated by a slightly impressed suture and spirally cingulate. The penultimate whorl has about 7 granose unequal ridges, the upper two large, third and fifth smaller. The body whorl is carinated, plano-concave beneath, with 7 concentric lirae, slightly or not at all granulose, separated by obliquely striated interstices. The aperture is rhomboidal, grooved within, the basal margin subcrenate. The oblique columella is folded above, compressed in the middle and toothless. The umbilical area is funnel-shaped, like an umbilicus. It is bordered with intense green.

== Distribution ==
This marine species occurs off Japan and in the Indo-Pacific.
