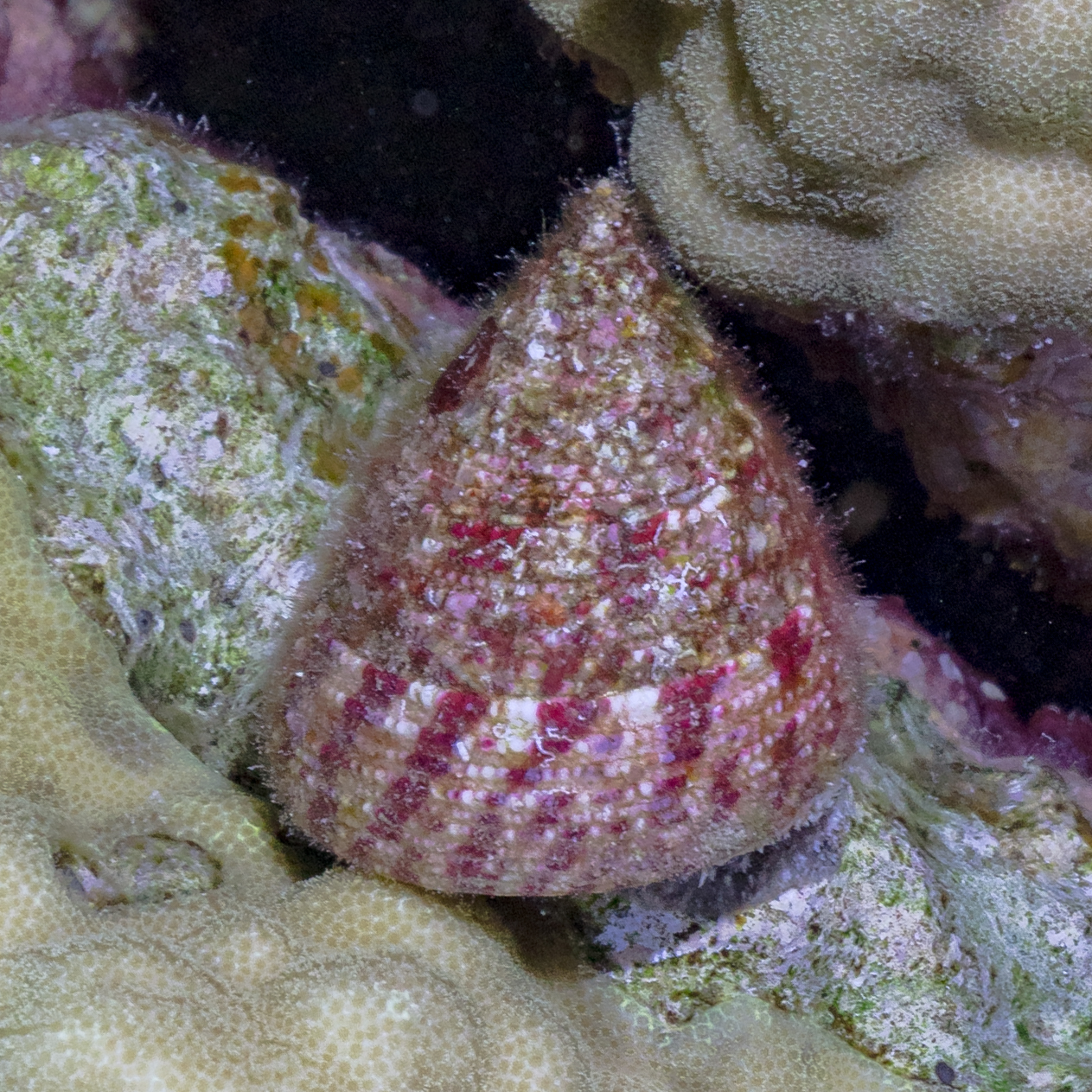
- Drawing of a live animal of Trochus intextus

Scientific classification
- Kingdom: Animalia
- Phylum: Mollusca
- Class: Gastropoda
- Subclass: Vetigastropoda
- Order: Trochida
- Superfamily: Trochoidea
- Family: Trochidae
- Genus: Trochus
- Species: T. intextus

Binomial name
- Trochus intextus Kiener, 1850

Synonyms
- Trochus metallicus Reeve, 1861; Trochus sandwichiensis Souleyet, F.L.A., 1852; Trochus tenebricus Reeve, 1861; Trochus tricatenatus Reeve, 1861 ·(junior synonym)

= Trochus intextus =

Species of gastropod

Trochus intextus is a species of sea snail, a marine gastropod mollusk in the family Trochidae, the top snails.

== Description ==
The size of the shell varies between 20 mm and 30 mm. The thick, solid shell has a rather straightly conical shape and is falsely umbilicate. The outlines of the nearly rectilinear spire are nearly straight with an acute apex. The shell contains about eight whorls. The body whorl is obtusely angulated at the periphery. The sutures are scarcely impressed. The color of the upper surface grayish or corneous white, broadly longitudinally striped with red or purplish, the red sometimes covering the whole surface, sometimes reduced to small maculations or narrow lines. The base of the shell contains narrow zigzag radiating red stripes. The sculpture of the upper surface consists of spiral series of very regular, deeply, separated rounded granules or beads, five or six rows on each whorl. On the periphery and base the granules are smaller. On the base of the shell the rows are more separated, and sometimes have minute intercalated beaded lirae. In the interstices; there are 12 to 15 rows of beads on the entire body whorl. The aperture is small, strongly lirate inside the outer lip. The dentate basal margin is thick. The parietal wall is callous, strongly lirate, deep crimson colored. The columella is oblique, irregularly 3 or 4 dentate. The umbilical tract contains a heavy white callus inside and is obsoletely spirally bi- or triplicate.

== Distribution ==
This marine species occurs in the Western Pacific Ocean and off Hawaii.
