= Trochus zhangi =

Scientific classification
- Kingdom: Animalia
- Phylum: Mollusca
- Class: Gastropoda
- Subclass: Vetigastropoda
- Order: Trochida
- Superfamily: Trochoidea
- Family: Trochidae
- Genus: Trochus
- Species: T. zhangi

Binomial name
- Trochus zhangi Dong, 2002

Species of gastropod

Trochus zhangi is a species of sea snail, a marine gastropod mollusk in the family Trochidae, the top snails.
