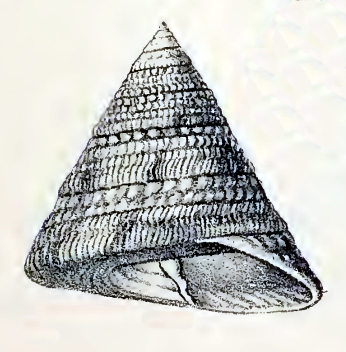
- Drawing with an aoertural view of a shell of Trochus flammulatus

Scientific classification
- Kingdom: Animalia
- Phylum: Mollusca
- Class: Gastropoda
- Subclass: Vetigastropoda
- Order: Trochida
- Superfamily: Trochoidea
- Family: Trochidae
- Genus: Trochus
- Species: T. flammulatus

Binomial name
- Trochus flammulatus Lamarck, 1822

= Trochus flammulatus =

Species of gastropod

Trochus flammulatus is a species of sea snail, a marine gastropod mollusk in the family Trochidae, the top snails.

== Description ==
The height of the shell attains 40 mm, its diameter 38 mm. The general form of this species is similar to Trochus maculatus. It is thick, solid, and heavy. The upper surface is longitudinally flammulated with dark red, the stripes distinct and broad, about as wide as the intervening whitish spaces. The stripes of the body whorl are continued over the obtuse periphery upon the base, where they become narrower, often bifurcate, and are zigzag. The sculpture above is like that of Trochus maculatus, the rows of granules about five or six on each whorl and the lower ones compressed and narrow. There is, besides, a fine, superficial, secondary sculpture of slightly oblique longitudinal minute wrinkles, which are continued over the periphery upon the base, forming there a finely shagreened pattern by the intersection of fine incremental stride. The base of the shell is rather more convex than in the typical Trochus maculatus, and its outer portion is nearly free from spiral line. These number about six. They are finely, closely crenulated by the wrinkles of the surface. The outer lip of the aperture is not crenulated, the other characters of the aperture and columella are precisely as in Trochus incrassatus.

== Distribution ==
This species occurs in the Indian Ocean off the Mascarenes, Aldabra and Chagos.
