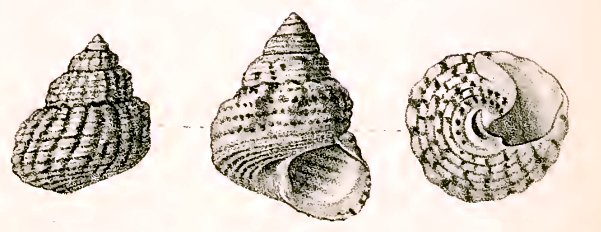
- Drawing with three views of a shell of Trochus kotschyi

Scientific classification
- Kingdom: Animalia
- Phylum: Mollusca
- Class: Gastropoda
- Subclass: Vetigastropoda
- Order: Trochida
- Superfamily: Trochoidea
- Family: Trochidae
- Genus: Trochus
- Species: T. kotschyi

Binomial name
- Trochus kotschyi Philippi, 1849

Synonyms
- Cantharidus kotschyi (Philippi, 1849); Osilinus kotschyi (Philippi, 1849); Priotrochus kotschyi (Philippi, 1849); Thalotia (Thalotia) kotschyi Philippi, 1849; Thalotia kotschyi (Philippi, 1849); Trochus (Gibbula) kotschyi Philippi, 1849; Trochus (Phorcus) kotschyi Philippi, 1849 (basionym)

= Trochus kotschyi =

Species of gastropod

Trochus kotschyi, common name the Kotschy's gibbula, is a species of sea snail, a marine gastropod mollusk in the subfamily Trochinae of the family Trochidae, the top snails.

== Description ==
The size of the shell varies between 18 mm and 30 mm. The narrowly perforated shell has a conoidal shape. It is whitish-ashen, ornamented with undulating, oblique, radiating chestnut or blackish stripes. The spire is acute. The shell contains 7 whorls. The first whorl is eroded, the remainder are angulated and nodulose above. Above the carina the shell is obliquely nodulose, below the carina spirally lirate with 4 lirae. The body whorl is biangular, convex beneath, and has 7 concentric brown-spotted lirae. The aperture is subquadrate. The white columella is arcuate, sinuous, and below strongly truncate-dentate.

== Distribution ==
This species occurs in the Persian Gulf and in the northwest Indian Ocean.
