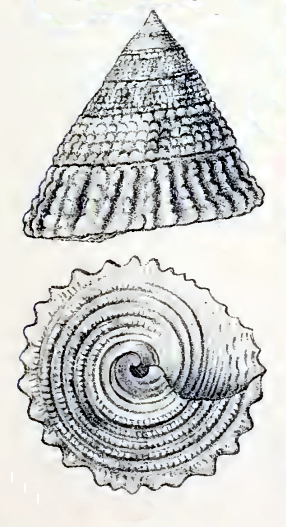
- Drawing showing two views of a shell of Trochus squarrosus

Scientific classification
- Kingdom: Animalia
- Phylum: Mollusca
- Class: Gastropoda
- Subclass: Vetigastropoda
- Order: Trochida
- Superfamily: Trochoidea
- Family: Trochidae
- Genus: Trochus
- Species: T. squarrosus

Binomial name
- Trochus squarrosus Lamarck, 1822

Synonyms
- Trochus oblitus Reeve

= Trochus squarrosus =

Species of gastropod

Trochus squarrosus is a species of sea snail, a marine gastropod mollusk in the family Trochidae, the top snails.

== Description ==
The height of an adult shell attains 35 mm, its diameter 40 mm. The thick, umbilicate shell has a conic-pyramidal shape. It is radiate with white and rose color. it contains 9 whorls, the embryonic smooth, the following planulate. The shell is sculptured with spiral series of regular beads the remaining whorls subexcavated in the middle, with three series of granules on the upper part and a series of oblique short folds below. The body whorl is carinated, with 16 to 24 folds crenulating its periphery. The base of the shell is planulate, with six concentric granulose lirae, separated by interstices as wide as the ridges. The aperture rhomboidal and lirate within. The umbilical area spirally plicate.

== Distribution ==
This species occurs in the Indian Ocean off Madagascar.
