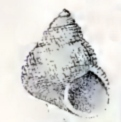
- Drawing with an apertural view of Putzeysia wiseri

Scientific classification
- Kingdom: Animalia
- Phylum: Mollusca
- Class: Gastropoda
- Subclass: Vetigastropoda
- Family: Eucyclidae
- Genus: Putzeysia
- Species: P. wiseri

Binomial name
- Putzeysia wiseri (Calcara, 1842)

Synonyms
- Trochus clathratus Aradas, 1847; Trochus crispulus Philippi, 1844; Trochus gemmulatus Philippi, 1844; Trochus wiseri Calcara, 1842 (basionym)

= Putzeysia wiseri =

Species of gastropod

Putzeysia wiseri is a species of sea snail, a marine gastropod mollusk in the family Eucyclidae.

== Description ==
The height of the shell attains 5 mm. The small shell has a subconic shape. It contains 6–7 more or less convex whorls. These are latticed by transverse cinguli (6 on penultimate whorl), and longitudinal elevated, oblique lines. The aperture is suborbicular. The outer lip is sulcate within.

== Distribution ==
This species is distributed in the Mediterranean Sea (found off the Gulf of Bona, Algiers) and in the Bay of Biscay.
