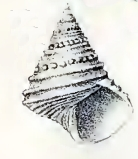
- Drawing with an apertural view of a shell of Calliostoma fonki

Scientific classification
- Kingdom: Animalia
- Phylum: Mollusca
- Class: Gastropoda
- Subclass: Vetigastropoda
- Order: Trochida
- Family: Calliostomatidae
- Subfamily: Calliostomatinae
- Genus: Calliostoma
- Species: C. fonki

Binomial name
- Calliostoma fonki (Philippi, 1860)

Synonyms
- Calliostoma fonkii (Philippi, 1860) (incorrect subsequent spelling); Trochus fonki Philippi, 1860 (original combination)

= Calliostoma fonki =

Species of gastropod

Calliostoma fonki is a species of sea snail, a marine gastropod mollusk in the family Calliostomatidae.

== Description ==
The size of the shell varies between 11 mm and 17 mm. The imperforate, thin shell has a conical shape. it is pale rose colored. The upper whorls are plane, and tricingulate. The upper cingulus is beaded, the second and the third are smooth. The body whorl is obtusely angled and encircled by 5 cinguli. The base of the shell is a little convex, with 6 cinguli. The aperture is quadrangular. The columella is a little oblique, cylindrical, scarcely truncate, but sensibly passing into the base.

== Distribution ==
This species occurs in the Pacific Ocean between El Salvador and Peru (not in the Galapagos Islands)
