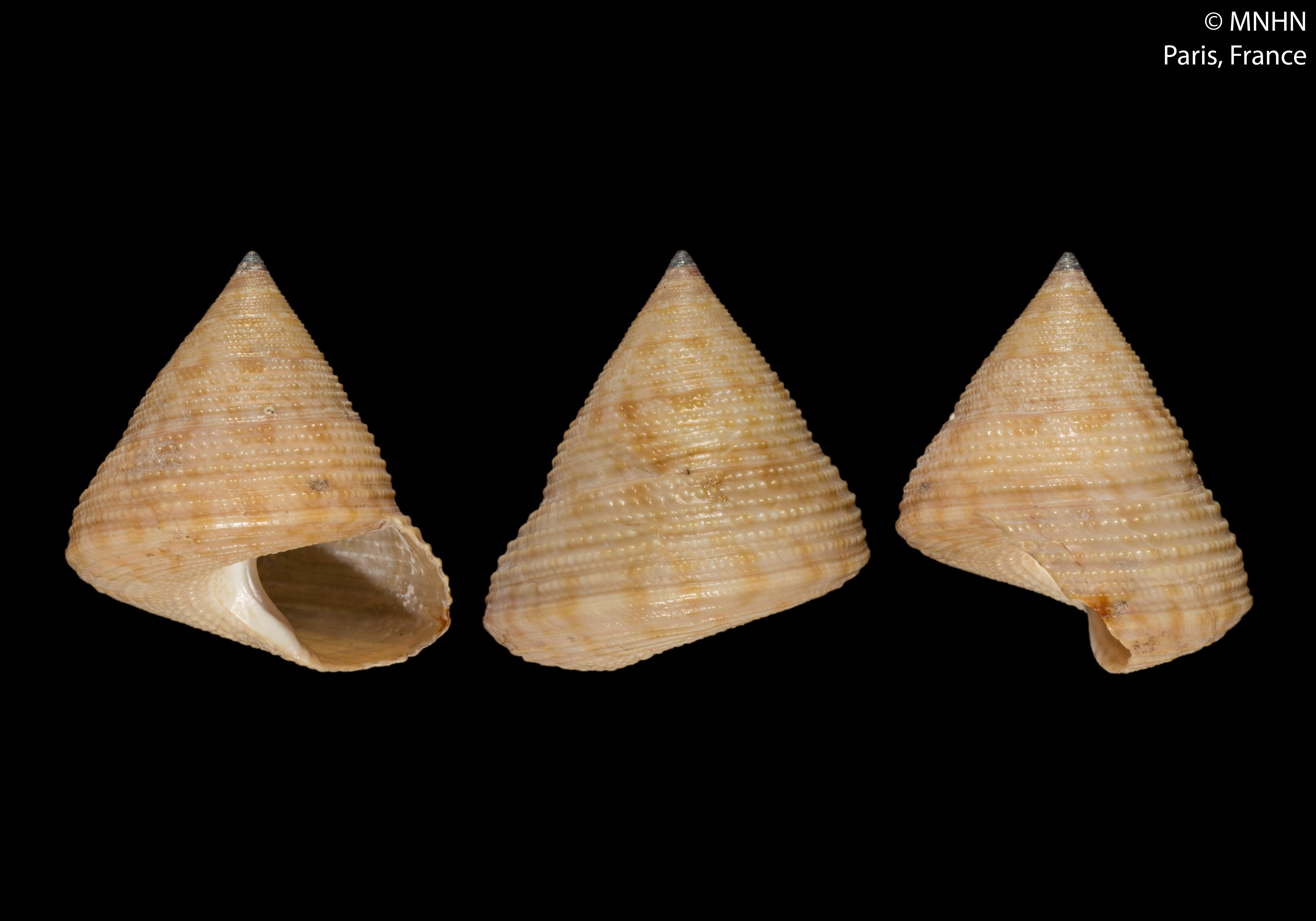
- Shell of Astele armillata (syntype at MNHN, Paris)

Scientific classification
- Kingdom: Animalia
- Phylum: Mollusca
- Class: Gastropoda
- Subclass: Vetigastropoda
- Order: Trochida
- Family: Calliostomatidae
- Subfamily: Calliostomatinae
- Genus: Astele
- Species: A. armillata

Binomial name
- Astele armillata (Wood, 1828)

Synonyms
- Astele armillatum [sic] · unaccepted (incorrect gender ending); Calliostoma armillata (W. Wood, 1828); Calliostoma meyeri Philippi, 1848; Trochus armillatus Wood, 1828; Trochus levis Hombron & Jacquinot, 1848 ·; Trochus meyeri Philippi, 1848; Ziziphinus euglyptus Adams, A. in Adams, H.G. & A. Adams, 1854

= Astele armillata =

Species of gastropod

Astele armillata is a species of sea snail, a marine gastropod mollusk in the family Calliostomatidae.

== Description ==
The length of this shell varies between 25 mm and 38 mm. The shell has a strictly conical shape. It is carinated, imperforate, and thin but rather solid. It is very pale yellowish or pinkish, with irregular, rather pale vertical bands of light yellowish-brown, often broken into maculations, and radiating on the base. The surface is shining, with numerous spiral granose lirae. There are seven lirae on the penultimate whorl, on the antepenultimate, and on the upper surface of the body whorl. And sometimes these three whorls (or the last one) show interstitial threads between the granose lirae. The flat base of the shell has 12 or 13 concentric lirae, the several inner ones stronger, decidedly beaded, the 3 or 4 outer more separated, less beaded. The angular periphery is formed of a double beaded ridge, and on some specimens this projects a little at the sutures of the spire. The spire is conic, elevated, with straight lateral outlines. The shell contains nine whorls. The smooth apex is subacute. The two earlier whorls follow the apical are trilirate. The body whorl is angular at periphery, flat beneath, indented in the center around the insertion of the columella. The aperture is rhomboidal, oblique, angled on the outer part, above the angle thickened inside by a heavy callus or pearly submarginal deposit. The columella is oblique, arcuate and a trifle toothed at base.

== Distribution ==
This marine species occurs off New South Wales, off Western Australia and off Tasmania
