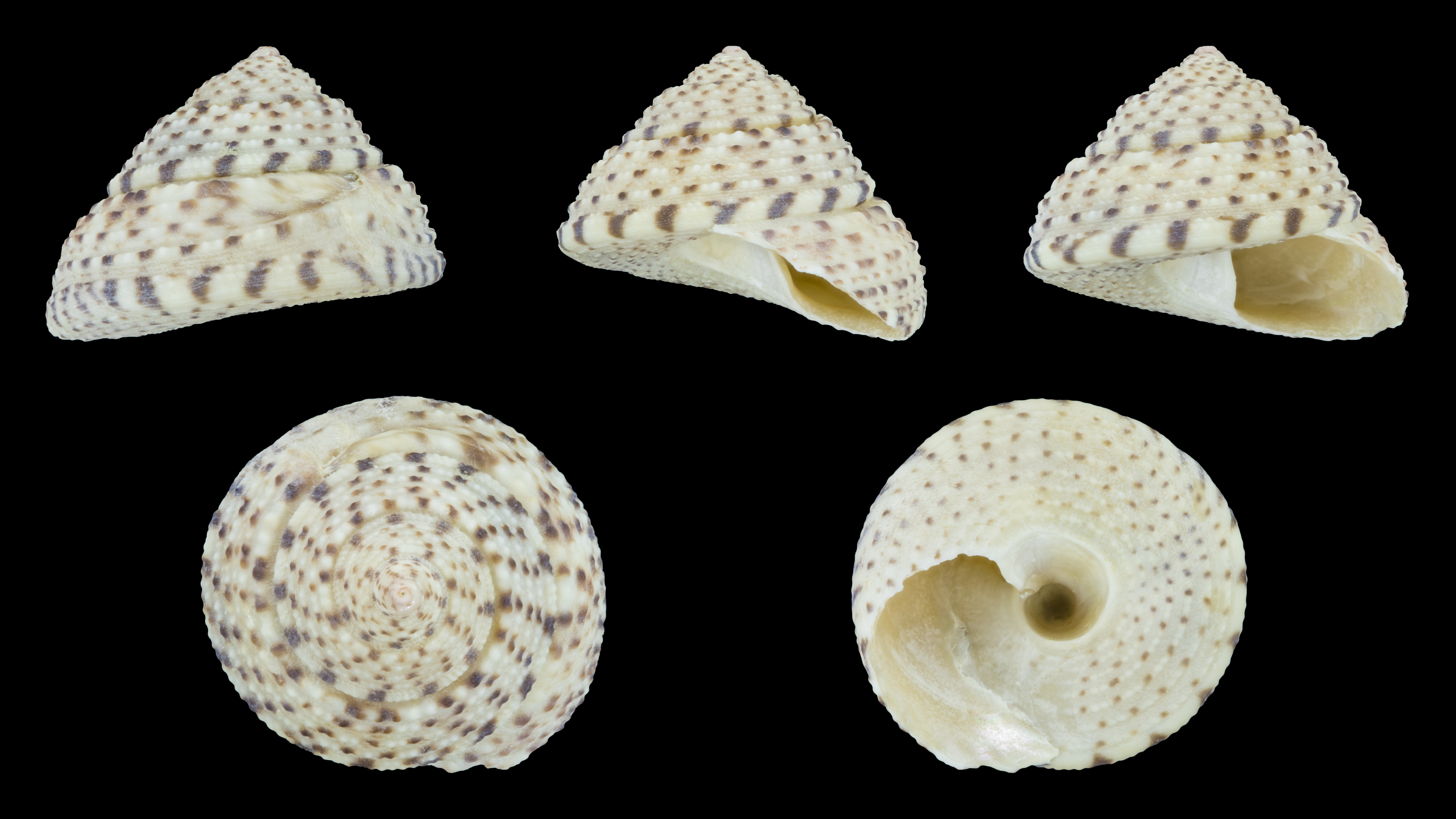
- Bright form
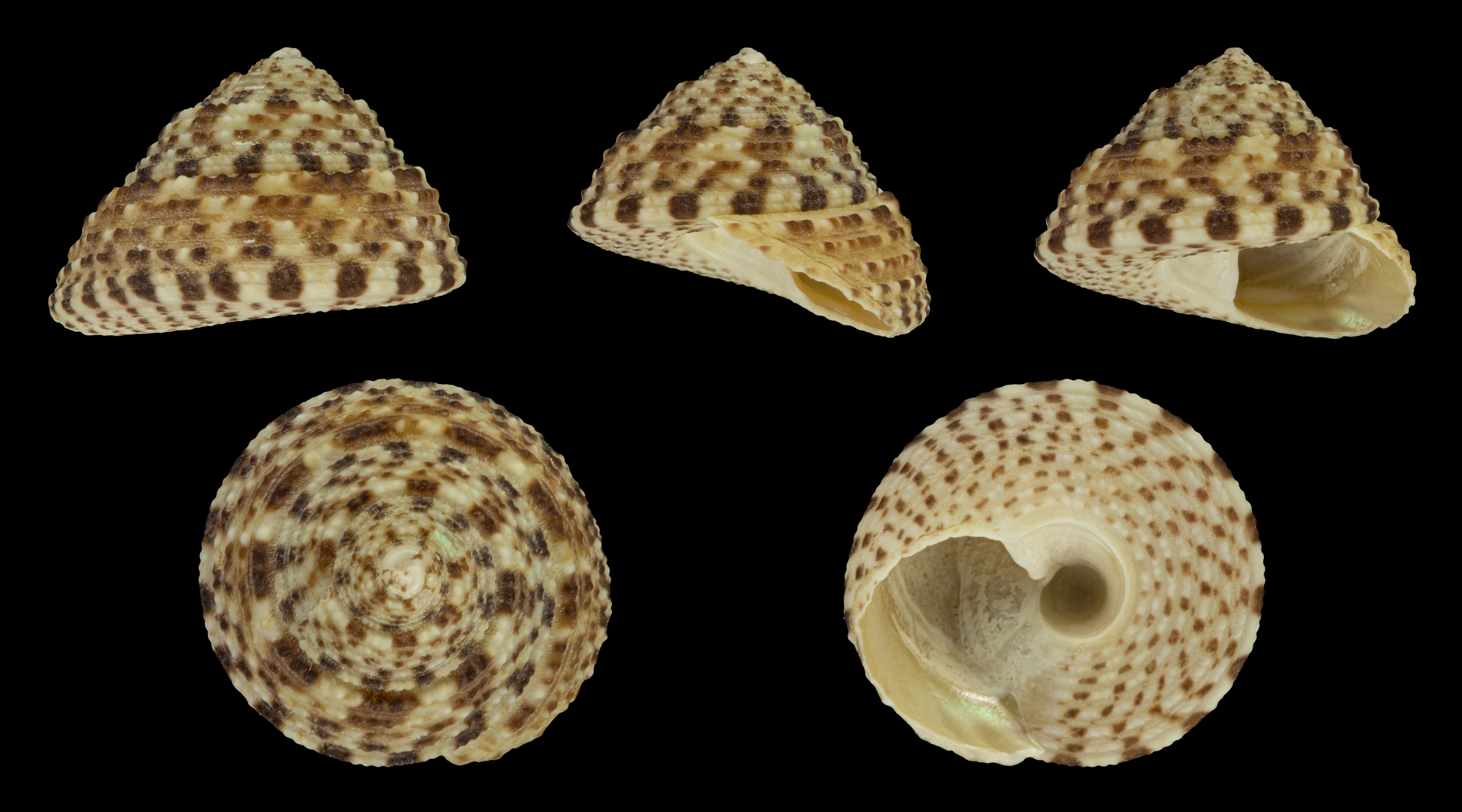
- Dark form

Scientific classification
- Kingdom: Animalia
- Phylum: Mollusca
- Class: Gastropoda
- Subclass: Vetigastropoda
- Order: Trochida
- Superfamily: Trochoidea
- Family: Trochidae
- Genus: Coelotrochus
- Species: C. tiaratus

Binomial name
- Coelotrochus tiaratus (Quoy & Gaimard, 1834)

Synonyms
- Anthora conica Hutton, 1882; Chlorostoma (Neozelandia) huttoni Cossmann, 1918; Polydonta elegans Gray, 1835; Trochus chatamensis Hutton, 1893; Trochus delicatulus Philippi, 1846; Trochus tiaratus Quoy & Gaimard, 1834

= Coelotrochus tiaratus =

Species of gastropod

Coelotrochus tiaratus, whose common names include tiara top shell, brown top shell, mititi, and mitimiti is a species of sea snail, a marine gastropod mollusk in the family Trochidae, the top snails.

== Description ==
The shell grows to a length of 18 mm. The depressed conical shell is very deeply false-umbilicate and rather thin. The spire has convex outlines;. The apex is acute, and lemon yellow when eroded. The 5 to 5½ whorls are nearly planulate, but the upper margin of each whorl is prominent and projecting beyond the periphery of the preceding. The body whorl is carinated at the periphery. The sculpture above consists of spiral lirae, about 5 to 8 on each whorl, cut into close oblique beads. The interstices are obliquely finely striate, one or two of the broader ones usually with a central riblet. The color of the shell is whitish or yellowish, finely tessellated or articulated with reddish brown The tessellations are formed by the disintegration of narrow radiating stripes, which are on the base frequently continuous. The base of the shell is nearly flat, with seven or eight concentric close fine lines, which are crenulated in a peculiarly irregular manner by distinct short oblique impressed marks. The interstices are finely radiately striate. The subrhomboidal aperture is smooth within. The columella is oblique, nearly straight, with an obsolete, scarcely perceptible fold above, inserted upon the side of the umbilicus, not in its center. The smooth umbilical area is white or yellow. The false-umbilicus is deep and narrow, but partly filled by a white callus, not tapering to a point. Specimens from rocky shores are often eroded and encrusted with coralline algae, while those from shell, gravel, or cobble substrata are usually clean. Primarily a grazer of hard surfaces, most abundant among beds of bivalves. Also occurs in tidal channels at the mouths of harbours, where it grazes over empty shells of pipis.

== Distribution ==
This marine shell occurs off New Zealand and the Chatham Islands subtidally down to 30m, in a range of habitats.
