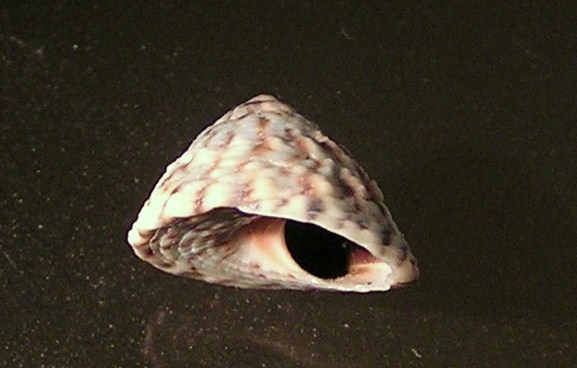

Scientific classification
- Kingdom: Animalia
- Phylum: Mollusca
- Class: Gastropoda
- Subclass: Caenogastropoda
- Order: Littorinimorpha
- Family: Littorinidae
- Genus: Bembicium
- Species: B. melanostoma

Binomial name
- Bembicium melanostoma (Gmelin, 1791)

Synonyms
- Bembicium lividum Philippi, 1846; Trochus luteus Quoy & Gaimard, 1834; Trochus melanostoma Gmelin, 1791

= Bembicium melanostoma =

Species of gastropod

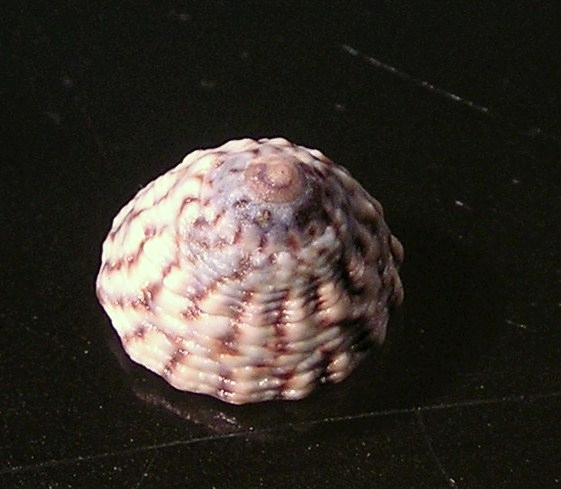
Bembicium melanostoma, top view

Bembicium melanostoma is a species of sea snail, a marine gastropod mollusk in the family Littorinidae, the winkles or periwinkles.
