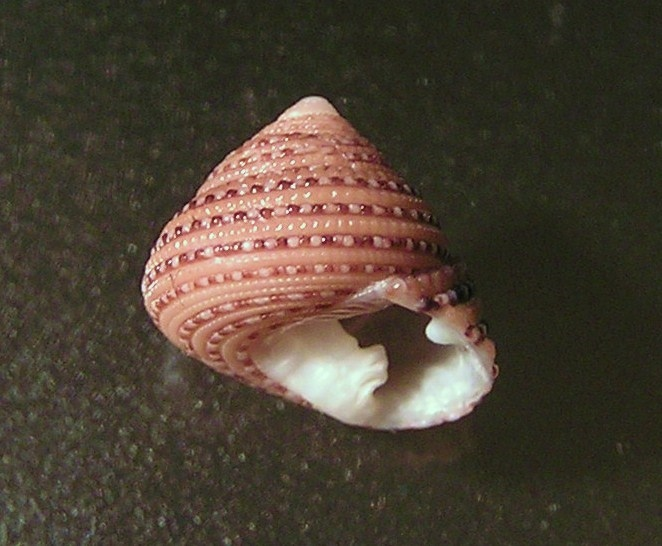
- Clanculus flosculus

Scientific classification
- Kingdom: Animalia
- Phylum: Mollusca
- Class: Gastropoda
- Subclass: Vetigastropoda
- Order: Trochida
- Superfamily: Trochoidea
- Family: Trochidae
- Genus: Clanculus
- Species: C. flosculus

Binomial name
- Clanculus flosculus P. Fischer, 1880

Synonyms
- Clanculus (Clanculus) flosculus (Fischer, 1878); Trochus (Clanculus) flosculus Fischer, 1878; Trochus flosculus P. Fischer, 1878

= Clanculus flosculus =

Species of gastropod

Clanculus flosculus is a species of sea snail, a marine gastropod mollusk in the family Trochidae, the top snails.

== Description ==
The size of the shell varies between 9 mm and 15 mm. The thick, narrowly perforate shell has a conoid shape with an acute apex and 7½ whorls. The first one is rosy, smooth, the rest convex. They are separated by linear sutures. They are spirally lirate with granose lirae;, 6 on the penultimate whorl, of which the 1st, 3d, 5th are entirely reddish, the 2d, 4th, 6th composed of alternating white and black granules. The body whorl is globose, bearing 15 or 16 lirae, somewhat convex beneath. The concentric lirae are uniform yellowish-brown, often in pairs, separated by single alternately white and black articulated lirae. The oblique aperture is rhomboid. The lip is thickened, plicate and dentate above. The columella is oblique, terminating in a large, plicate, contorted, truncate tooth. The narrow umbilicus is profound with a crenulated border. The parietal callus is wrinkled.

== Distribution ==
This species occurs in the Indian Ocean off Madagascar, the Seychelles, Aldabra and Chagos and off KwaZulu-Natal, South Africa.
