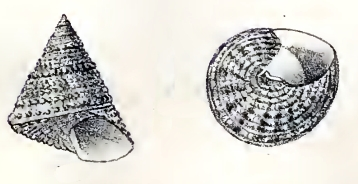
- Drawing with two views of a shell of Calliostoma fragum

Scientific classification
- Kingdom: Animalia
- Phylum: Mollusca
- Class: Gastropoda
- Subclass: Vetigastropoda
- Order: Trochida
- Family: Calliostomatidae
- Genus: Calliostoma
- Species: C. fragum

Binomial name
- Calliostoma fragum (Philippi, 1848)

Synonyms
- Trochus fragum Philippi, 1848; Zizyphinus fragum Philippi in Reeve

= Calliostoma fragum =

Species of gastropod

Calliostoma fragum is a species of sea snail, a marine gastropod mollusk in the family Calliostomatidae.

== Description ==
The height of the shell attains 8 mm. The subperforate shell has a conical shape. It is pale purplish-brown, painted with whitish stripes, with 4 distant series of granules. The eight granulate whorls have their basal margins prominent. The interstices are very delicately obliquely striate. The base is a little convex, sculptured with 8 flat subgranose concentric lirae, each one divided by a furrow into two parts, alternating with narrow elevated lines. The smooth aperture is rhomboidal. The columella is a little oblique, and subtruncate at its base.

== Distribution ==
This marine species occurs off the Philippines.
