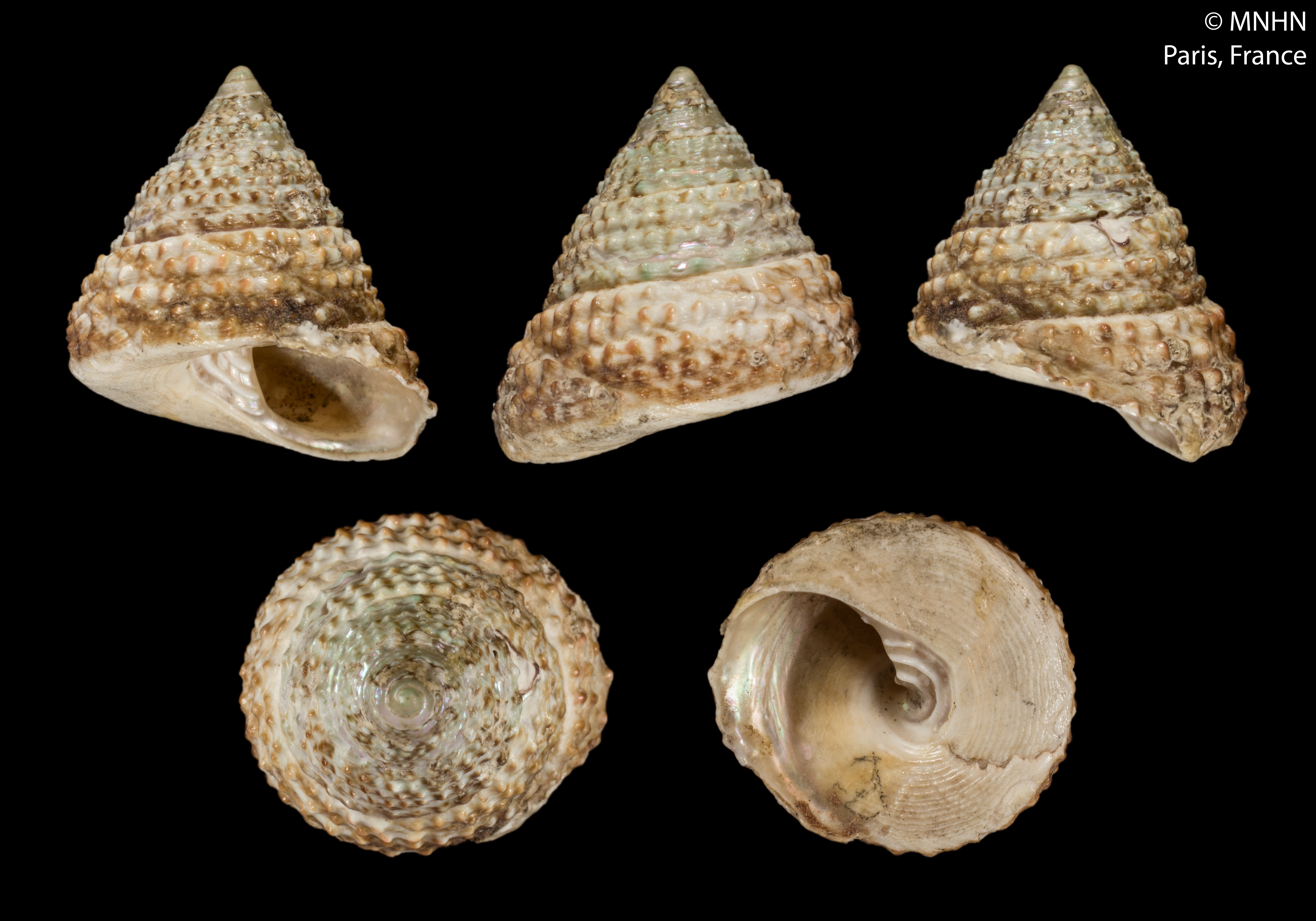
- Shell of Coelotrochus viridis (lectotype at MNHN, Paris)

Scientific classification
- Kingdom: Animalia
- Phylum: Mollusca
- Class: Gastropoda
- Subclass: Vetigastropoda
- Order: Trochida
- Superfamily: Trochoidea
- Family: Trochidae
- Genus: Coelotrochus
- Species: C. viridis

Binomial name
- Coelotrochus viridis (Gmelin, 1791)

Synonyms
- Anthora tritonis Hutton, 1880; Polydonta tritonis A. Adams, 1854; Polydonta (Infundibulum) tritonis A. Adams, 1855; Polydonta tuberculata Gray, 1843; Polydonta viridescens A. Adams, 1853; Trochus (Thorista) viridis Gmelin, 1791; Trochus acinosus Gould; Trochus fulvolabris Hombron & Jacquinot, 1853; Trochus viridis Gmelin, 1791 (original description)

= Coelotrochus viridis =

Species of gastropod

Coelotrochus viridis, common name the green top shell, is a species of sea snail, a marine gastropod mollusk in the family Trochidae, the top snails.

== Description ==
The length of the shell varies between 15 mm and 25 mm. The solid shell has a conical shape with nearly straight outlines and is false-umbilicate. The sculpture of the upper surface consists of 5 series to each whorl of rounded bead-like granules, between which are visible numerous very minute spiral striae, in the interstices of which oblique incremental striae are prominently shown under a lens. The base of the shell is concentrically striate with unequal striae that disappear toward the outer edge. The colour of the shell is dull grey, whitish, or greenish. The apex is acute. The protoconch is very small, with 1½ whorls, which have a slightly rugose surface. The about 7 whorls are nearly planulate, or sometimes a little bulging at the upper and lower margins. The body whorl is strongly angled or carinate at the periphery. The base of the shell is plano-concave. The suture is rather deep. The aperture is suboval to quadrangular and is nacreous within. The outer lip is convex, sharp, with a smooth marginal band inside. The outer part is narrow, white, and opaque. The inner part is broader, iridescent, and smooth. Further inside it is lirate. The basal lip is thickened, subdentate, uniting with the columella in a regular curve. The columella is oblique, with a deep fold near its insertion, and is smooth within. The umbilical area contains 3 to 4 spiral ribs. The interstices are nacreous. The umbilicus is narrow and deep or partly filled up by a white callus. The parietal wall is transversely striate or nearly smooth, with a light brown callus.

The animal is yellowish-brown. Its foot is reddish or purplish-brown. The filaments are white, 3 on each side. The head-lobes are smooth and rounded, and joined across the head. The eyes are on rather long white peduncles.

== Distribution ==
This marine species is endemic to New Zealand.
