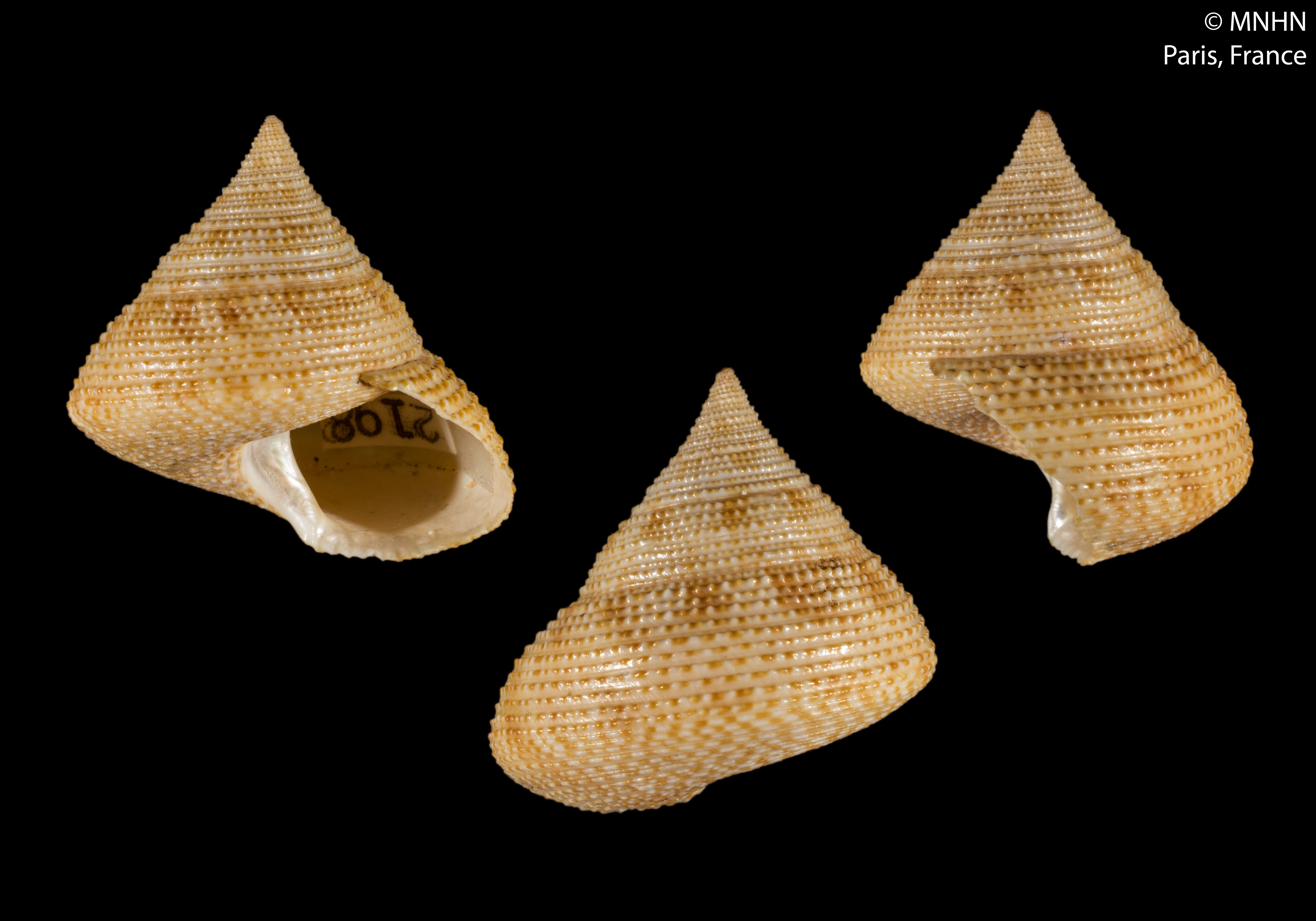
- Shell of Maurea pellucida (lectotype at MNHN, Paris)

Scientific classification
- Kingdom: Animalia
- Phylum: Mollusca
- Class: Gastropoda
- Subclass: Vetigastropoda
- Order: Trochida
- Superfamily: Trochoidea
- Family: Calliostomatidae
- Genus: Maurea
- Species: M. pellucida

Binomial name
- Maurea pellucida (Valenciennes, 1846)

Synonyms
- Calliostoma (Calliotropis) pellucidum (Valenciennes, 1846); Calliostoma (Calliotropis) pellucidum spiratum W. R. B. Oliver, 1926; Calliostoma (Maurea) pellucidum (Valenciennes, 1846); Calliostoma pellucidum (Valenciennes, 1846); Calliostoma undulatum Finlay, 1923; Trochus pellucidus Valenciennes, 1846; Trochus torquatus Anton in Philippi, 1848; Venustas pellucida (Valenciennes, 1846)

= Maurea pellucida =

Species of gastropod

Maurea pellucida also known as pellucid top shell, is a species of sea snail, a marine gastropod mollusk, in the family Calliostomatidae within the superfamily Trochoidea, the top snails, turban snails and their allies.

== Description ==
The length of the shell attains 27 mm.

== Distribution ==
This marine species occurs off New Caledonia and New Zealand.
