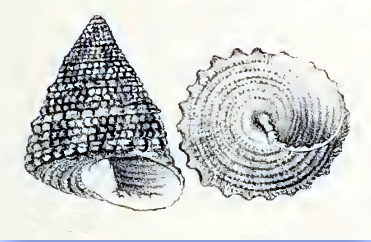
- Drawing with two views of a shell of Trochus calcaratus

Scientific classification
- Kingdom: Animalia
- Phylum: Mollusca
- Class: Gastropoda
- Subclass: Vetigastropoda
- Order: Trochida
- Superfamily: Trochoidea
- Family: Trochidae
- Genus: Trochus
- Species: T. calcaratus

Binomial name
- Trochus calcaratus Souverbie in Souverbie & Montrouzier, 1874

Synonyms
- Infundibulum (Lamprostoma) calcaratum (Souverbie in Souverbie & Montrouzier, 1874); Trochus (Polydonta) calcaratus Souverbie in Souverbie & Montrouzier, 1875; Trochus histrio Reeve, 1848; Trochus pustulosus Philippi, 1849; Trochus sacellus Philippi, R.A., 1854

= Trochus calcaratus =

Species of gastropod

Trochus calcaratus, common name the actor top shell, is a species of sea snail, a marine gastropod mollusk in the family Trochidae, the top snails.

The name Trochus histrio was not well described by Reeve, and as was his custom in Trochus, only a back view was given by Reeve, so that positive identification is difficult.

== Description ==
The size of the shell varies between 18 mm and 40 mm. The solid, false-umbilicate shell has an elate-conic shape. The spire has nearly rectilinear outlines. The about 9 whorls are planulate, the body whorl is carinated. The sculpture of the upper surface consists of spiral series, four or five on each whorl, of regular, closely arranged granules, which are either rounded, bead-like, or laterally compressed. Upon the periphery of each whorl, there is a row of radiating, minutely perforated pustules, numbering on the body whorl 28. The base of the shell is concentrically sculptured with 6 to 7 concentric, densely granose lirae. It is slightly convex, radiately striped with brown or purplish. The color of the upper surface is whitish, broadly striped with red, purplish or brown. It is usually blue when rubbed. The aperture is lirate within on outer and parietal walls. The basal margin is concave, thick, and dentate within. The columella is oblique, plicate within and quadridentate. The white umbilical tract is biplicate.

This species is principally distinguished by the fistulous or perforated peripheral tubercles.

== Distribution ==
This species occurs on coral reefs and in the low and shallow subtidal zone in the Western and Central Pacific Ocean. In Australian waters it occurs off the Northern Territory, Queensland and Western Australia.
