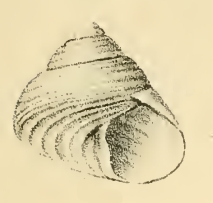
- Drawing of a shell of Gibbula leucophaea

Scientific classification
- Kingdom: Animalia
- Phylum: Mollusca
- Class: Gastropoda
- Subclass: Vetigastropoda
- Order: Trochida
- Superfamily: Trochoidea
- Family: Trochidae
- Genus: Gibbula
- Species: G. leucophaea

Binomial name
- Gibbula leucophaea (Philippi, 1836)

Synonyms
- Gibbula adansonii var. adriatica (Philippi, 1836); Gibbula delicata Coen 1937; Trochus cinerascens Anton 1839; Trochus euxinicus Andrzeiewsky 1837; Trochus leucophaeus Philippi 1836 (original description)

= Gibbula leucophaea =

Species of gastropod

Gibbula leucophaea is a species of sea snail, a marine gastropod mollusk in the family Trochidae, the top snails.

== Description ==
The size of the shell varies between 5 mm and 7 mm. Compared with Gibbula adansonii, is the shell more solid, generally paler, and the base whitish. The spiral sculpture is stronger. The penultimate whorl has about 5 well-marked, separated spiral lirae. The body whorl is angulate at the periphery.

== Distribution ==
This species occurs in the Mediterranean Sea and in the Atlantic Ocean off the Azores.
