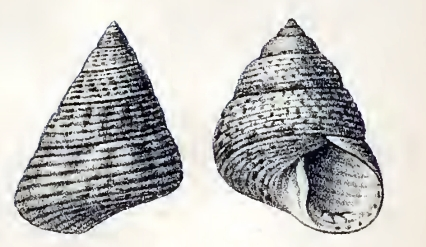
- Drawing with two views of a shell of Jujubinus montagui

Scientific classification
- Kingdom: Animalia
- Phylum: Mollusca
- Class: Gastropoda
- Subclass: Vetigastropoda
- Order: Trochida
- Superfamily: Trochoidea
- Family: Trochidae
- Genus: Jujubinus
- Species: J. montagui

Binomial name
- Jujubinus montagui (Wood, 1828)

Synonyms
- Cantharidus montagui (W. Wood, 1828); Jujubinus montagui mediterraneus Ghisotti & Melone, 1975; Trochus abandus Chiereghini (misspelling); Trochus abanteus Nardo, 1847; Trochus cyrnaeus Réquien, 1848 (dubious synonym); Trochus montacuti Jeffreys, 1865; Trochus montagui Wood, 1828 (original description); Trochus parvulus Philippi, 1844; Trochus solidulus Monterosato, T.A. de M. di; Trochus striatus Forbes, E.; Trochus tumidulus Nardo, 1847

= Jujubinus montagui =

Species of gastropod

Jujubinus montagui is a species of sea snail, a marine gastropod mollusk in the family Trochidae, the top snails.

== Description ==
The size of the shell varies between 3 mm and 9 mm. The imperforate or very minutely perforate shell has a conical. The 7 whorls are a little convex. The earlier buff, following pale buffish-ashen, is ornamented with obscure maculations or zones of chestnut. The shell is obliquely striate, spirally lirate with 6 subequal lirae on the penultimate whorl. The body whorl is a little convex above, carinated in the middle, convex beneath and provided with 7–8 concentric, white-and-brown articulated lirae. The aperture is rhomboid. The columella is subtruncate below.

== Distribution ==
This species occurs in the North Sea, the North Atlantic Ocean (from Scotland to Madeira) and in the Mediterranean Sea.
