= Calliostoma tornatum =

Scientific classification
- Kingdom: Animalia
- Phylum: Mollusca
- Class: Gastropoda
- Subclass: Vetigastropoda
- Order: Trochida
- Family: Calliostomatidae
- Genus: Calliostoma
- Species: C. tornatum

Binomial name
- Calliostoma tornatum (Röding, 1798)

Synonyms
- Trochus tornatus Röding, 1798

Species of gastropod

Calliostoma tornatum is a species of sea snail, a marine gastropod mollusk in the family Calliostomatidae.
