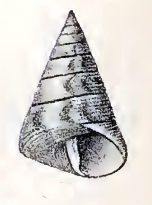
- Drawing of a shell of Calliostoma gualterianum

Scientific classification
- Kingdom: Animalia
- Phylum: Mollusca
- Class: Gastropoda
- Subclass: Vetigastropoda
- Order: Trochida
- Family: Calliostomatidae
- Genus: Calliostoma
- Species: C. gualterianum

Binomial name
- Calliostoma gualterianum (Philippi, 1848)

Synonyms
- Trochus gualterianus Philippi, 1848 (original description); Trochus gualtierianus Fischer; Trochus gualterii Weinkauff

= Calliostoma gualterianum =

Species of gastropod

Calliostoma gualterianum, common name Gualtieri's top shell, is a species of sea snail, a marine gastropod mollusk in the family Calliostomatidae.

== Description ==
The size of the shell varies between 10 mm and 17 mm. The imperforate, polished, solid shell has a conical-elevated shape with 9 whorls. It is yellowish-brown or olive, clouded with brown, the earlier 4 whorls dark bluish or greenish. The shell is spirally sulcate, the 2d whorl somewhat granulate. The rest of the whorls are smooth, flat, and with a narrow supra-sutural fasciole, which on the body whorl is not developed. The periphery is rounded angular. The base of the shell is smooth except for about 4 fine riblets around the axis. The aperture is smooth within. The nacreous columella is a trifle swollen at its base, and either purple or whitish inside.

== Distribution ==
This species occurs in the Mediterranean Sea.
