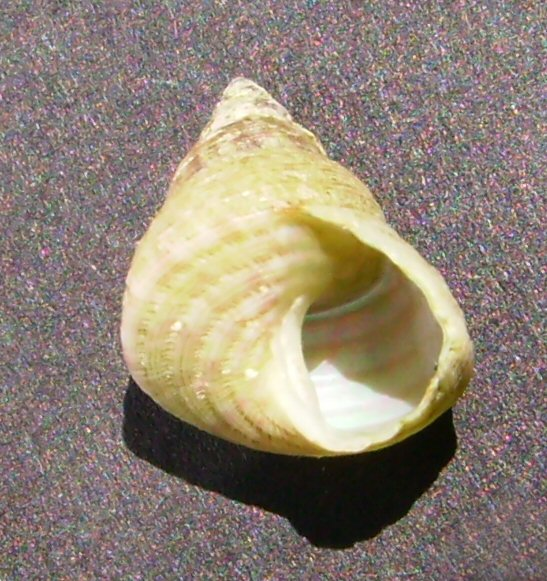
- Apertural view of a shell of Micrelenchus purpureus

Scientific classification
- Kingdom: Animalia
- Phylum: Mollusca
- Class: Gastropoda
- Subclass: Vetigastropoda
- Order: Trochida
- Family: Trochidae
- Genus: Micrelenchus
- Species: M. purpureus

Binomial name
- Micrelenchus purpureus (Gmelin, 1791)

Synonyms
- Cantharidus (Mawhero) purpureus (Gmelin, 1791); Cantharidus purpureus (Gmelin, 1791); Helix purpurea Gmelin, 1791 (basionym); Micrelenchus (Mawhero) purpureus (Gmelin, 1791)· accepted, alternate representation; Phasianella rubella Menke, 1828; Trochus elegans Gmelin, 1791; Trochus pallidus Hombron & Jacquinot, 1848; Trochus rostratus Gmelin, 1791; Trochus texturatus Gould, 1849; Trochus torosus Kiener, 1850

= Micrelenchus purpureus =

Species of gastropod

Micrelenchus purpureus, common name the red opal top shell, is a species of medium-sized sea snail, a marine gastropod mollusc in the family Trochidae.

== Description ==
The length of the shell varies between 16 mm and 32 mm. It grazes on seaweed.

(Described in Latin as Trochus texturatus) The conical shell is imperforate (lacking an umbilicus) and solid. It is ashy-gray, tinged with green or rose, and is cancellated (latticed or cross-hatched) with spiral cords with rose spots and with thin increment lamellae: the spire has 7 whorls, which are scarcely convex, with the body whorl being sub-angulate (slightly cornered). The aperture is rounded and expanded anteriorly. The columella is rounded, with the outer lip being sloping and sharp. The interior is pearly and iridescent.

== Distribution ==
This marine species occurs off North Island and South Island, New Zealand.
