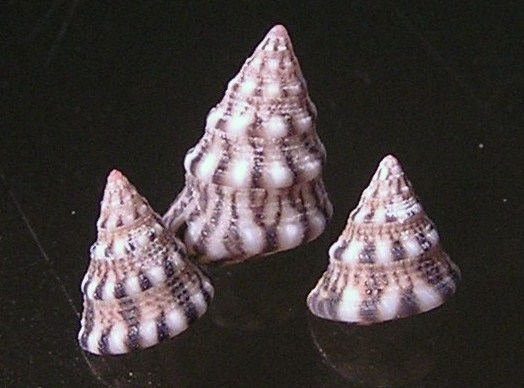
- Jujubinus unindentatus

Scientific classification
- Kingdom: Animalia
- Phylum: Mollusca
- Class: Gastropoda
- Subclass: Vetigastropoda
- Order: Trochida
- Superfamily: Trochoidea
- Family: Trochidae
- Genus: Jujubinus; Monterosato, 1884

Type species
- Trochus matonii Payraudeau, 1826

Synonyms
- Calliostoma (Jujubinus) Monterosato, 1884; Cantharidus (Jujubinus) Monterosato, 1884; Gravijubinus Nordsieck, 1975; Jujubinus (Jujubinus) Monterosato, 1884; Jujubinus (Mirulinus) Monterosato, 1917; Manotrochus Fischer, 1885; Mirulinus Monterosato, 1917; Pictijubinus Nordsieck, 1975; Zizyphinus (Jujubinus) Monterosato, 1884

= Jujubinus =

Genus of gastropods

Jujubinus is a genus of sea snails, marine gastropod mollusks in the family Trochidae, the top snails.

The species of Jujubinus are close in appearance to Cantharidus Montfort, 1810, and differ only in their more angular body whorl and a narrower spire angle.

== Species ==
Species within the genus Jujubinus include:

- † Jujubinus ajachaensis (Martín-González & Vera-Peláez, 2018)
- Jujubinus alboranensis (Smriglio, Mariottini & Oliverio, 2015)
- † Jujubinus altavillae (Giannuzzi-Savelli & Reina, 1987)
- † Jujubinus angustus (Deshayes, 1832)
- † Jujubinus annamarieae (Landau, Marquet & Grigis, 2003)
- † Jujubinus armatus (Ceulemans, Van Dingenen & Landau, 2016)
- † Jujubinus astraeaformis (Brunetti & Della Bella, 2006)
- Jujubinus augustoi (Rolan & Gori, 2009)
- Jujubinus baudoni (Monterosato, 1891)
- Jujubinus browningleeae (Smriglio, Mariottini & Swinnen, 2018)
- † Jujubinus bucklandi (Cossmann & Peyrot, 1917)
- † Jujubinus bullula (P. Fischer, 1877)
- † Jujubinus burdigalicus (Cossmann & Peyrot, 1917)
- Jujubinus catenatus (Ardovini, 2006)
- † Jujubinus celinae (Andrzejowski, 1833)
- † Jujubinus condevicnumensis (Ceulemans, Van Dingenen & Landau, 2016)
- † Jujubinus coronatus (Landau, Van Dingenen & Ceulemans, 2017)
- Jujubinus curinii (Bogi & Campani, 2005)
- † Jujubinus demersus (Kranz, 1910)
- † Jujubinus deshayesi (Mayer, 1862)
- Jujubinus dispar (Curini-Galletti, 1982)
- † Jujubinus ditropis (Wood, 1848)
- Jujubinus eleonorae (Smriglio, Di Giulio & Mariottini, 2014)
- Jujubinus errinae (Smriglio, Mariottini & Giacobbe, 2016)
- Jujubinus escondidus (Poppe, Tagaro & Dekker, 2006)
- Jujubinus exasperatus ((Pennant, 1777)
- † Jujubinus fossorensis (Lozouet, 1999)
- Jujubinus fraterculus (Monterosato, 1880)
- Jujubinus fulgor (Gofas, 1991)
- † Jujubinus gaasensis (Cossmann & Peyrot, 1917)
- Jujubinus geographicus (Poppe, Tagaro & Dekker, 2006)
- Jujubinus gilberti (Montrouzier, 1878)
- Jujubinus gravinae (Dautzenberg, 1881)
- Jujubinus guanchus (Curini-Galletti, 1985)
- Jujubinus guphili (Poppe, Tagaro & Dekker, 2006)
- † Jujubinus gymnospirus (Cossmann & Peyrot, 1917)
- † Jujubinus hannonicus (Rutot in Cossmann, 1915)
- † Jujubinus helenae (Pacaud, 2017)
- Jujubinus hernandezi (Rolan & Swinnen, 2009)
- † Jujubinus hoernesianus (Sacco, 1896)
- Jujubinus hubrechti (Poppe, Tagaro & Dekker, 2006)
- † Jujubinus infraoligocaenicus (Cossmann & Lambert, 1884)
- Jujubinus interruptus (Wood, 1828)
- Jujubinus karpathoensis (Nordsieck, 1973)
- † Jujubinus kostejanus (Boettger, 1907)
- † Jujubinus lamarckii (Deshayes, 1832)
- † Jujubinus lamberti (Cossmann, 1892)
- † Jujubinus lawleyi (De Stefani & Pantanelli, 1888)
- † Jujubinus ligeriensis (Ceulemans, Van Dingenen & Landau, 2016)
- Jujubinus mabelae (Rolan & Swinnen, 2009)
- Jujubinus maldivensis (E. A. Smith, 1903)
- † Jujubinus mimus (Eichwald, 1850)
- Jujubinus montagui (Wood, 1828)
- † Jujubinus pigeonblancensis (Ceulemans, Van Dingenen & Landau, 2016)
- † Jujubinus planatus (Friedberg, 1928)
- Jujubinus polychroma (A. Adams, 1853)
- Jujubinus poppei (Curini-Galletti, 1985)
- † Jujubinus proximus (Millet, 1865)
- Jujubinus pseudogravinae (Nordsieck, 1973)
- † Jujubinus pseudoturricula (Dollfus & Dautzenberg, 1886)
- † Jujubinus puber (Eichwald, 1850)
- † Jujubinus punctulatus (Dujardin, 1837)
- † Jujubinus quadrangulatus (Briart & Cornet, 1887)
- † Jujubinus quantulus (Lozouet, 1999)
- Jujubinus rafaemesai (Rolán & Swinnen, 2013)
- † Jujubinus redoniensis (Landau, Van Dingenen & Ceulemans, 2017)
- † Jujubinus rhenanus (Braun in Walchner, 1851)
- Jujubinus rubioi (Rolan & Templado, 2001)
- Jujubinus ruscurianus (Weinkauff, 1868)
- † Jujubinus sceauxensis (Landau, Van Dingenen & Ceulemans, 2017)
- † Jujubinus sexangularis (Sandberger, 1859)
- Jujubinus silbogomerus (Smriglio, Mariottini & Swinnen, 2019)
- † Jujubinus silveri (Welle, 2009)
- Jujubinus striatus (Linnaeus, 1758)
- Jujubinus suarezensis (P. Fischer, 1878)
- † Jujubinus subcarinatus (Lamarck, 1804)
- † Jujubinus subfragilis (d'Orbigny, 1850)
- † Jujubinus subincrassatus (d'Orbigny, 1852)
- † Jujubinus subreticulatus (Boettger, 1907)
- † Jujubinus subtilistriatus (Cossmann & Peyrot, 1917)
- † Jujubinus subturgidulus (d'Orbigny, 1850)
- Jujubinus tingitanus (Pallary, 1902)
- Jujubinus trilloi (Smriglio, Di Giulio & Mariottini, 2014)
- † Jujubinus trochlearis (Sandberger, 1859)
- Jujubinus tumidulus (Aradas, 1846)
- † Jujubinus turgidulus (Brocchi, 1814)
- † Jujubinus turricula (Eichwald, 1830)
- Jujubinus unidentatus (Philippi, 1844)
- † Jujubinus vexans (Boettger, 1907)
- Jujubinus vexationis (Curini-Galletti, 1990)
- † Jujubinus zukowcensis (Andrzejowski, 1833)

Species brought into synonymy

- Jujubinus (Jujubinus) Monterosato, 1884: alternate representation of Jujubinus
- Jujubinus (Mirulinus) Monterosato, 1917: alternate representation of Jujubinus
- Jujubinus (Clelandella): synonym of Clelandella Winckworth, 1932
- Jujubinus aegeensis Nordsieck, 1973: synonym of Jujubinus karpathoensis Nordsieck, 1973
- Jujubinus aequistriatus Monterosato, 1884: synonym of Jujubinus striatus (Linnaeus, 1758)
- Jujubinus africanus Nordsieck, 1973: synonym of Jujubinus unidentatus (Philippi, 1844)
- Jujubinus altior Coen, 1937: synonym of Jujubinus striatus (Linnaeus, 1758)
- Jujubinus aureus Monterosato, 1890: synonym of Clelandella miliaris (Brocchi, 1814)
- Jujubinus baudouini [sic]: synonym of Jujubinus baudoni (Monterosato, 1891)
- Jujubinus brugnonei Coen, 1937: synonym of Jujubinus striatus (Linnaeus, 1758)
- Jujubinus clelandi (Wood, 1828): synonym of Clelandella miliaris (Brocchi, 1814)
- Jujubinus corallinus Monterosato, 1884: synonym of Jujubinus exasperatus (Pennant, 1777)
- Jujubinus crenelliferus (A. Adams, 1853): synonym of Cantharidus crenelliferus (A. Adams, 1853)
- Jujubinus decipiens Parenzan, 1970: synonym of Jujubinus striatus (Linnaeus, 1758)
- Jujubinus defiorei Coen, 1937: synonym of Jujubinus striatus (Linnaeus, 1758)
- Jujubinus delpreteanus Sulliotti, 1889: synonym of Jujubinus striatus (Linnaeus, 1758)
- Jujubinus elenchoides (Issel, 1878): synonym of Jujubinus striatus (Linnaeus, 1758)
- Jujubinus fulguratus Pallary, 1906: synonym of Jujubinus unidentatus (Philippi, 1844)
- Jujubinus gilberti (Montrouzier in Fischer, 1878): synonym of Cantharidus polychroma (A. Adams, 1853)
- Jujubinus goniobasis Coen, 1937: synonym of Jujubinus striatus (Linnaeus, 1758)
- Jujubinus igneus Sturany, 1896: synonym of Jujubinus exasperatus (Pennant, 1777)
- Jujubinus istrianus Coen, 1933: synonym of Jujubinus exasperatus (Pennant, 1777)
- Jujubinus kochi Nordsieck, 1973: synonym of Jujubinus ruscurianus (Weinkauff, 1868)
- Jujubinus lepidus (Philippi, 1846): synonym of Strigosella lepida (Philippi, 1846)
- Jujubinus magnificus Coen, 1937: synonym of Jujubinus striatus (Linnaeus, 1758)
- Jujubinus miliaris (Brocchi, 1814): synonym of Clelandella miliaris (Brocchi, 1814)
- Jujubinus mixtus Ghisotti & Melone, 1975: synonym of Jujubinus exasperatus (Pennant, 1777)
- Jujubinus montagui mediterraneus Coen, G.S: synonym of Jujubinus montagui (Wood, W., 1828)
- Jujubinus multistriatus Ghisotti & Melone, 1975: synonym of Jujubinus striatus (Linnaeus, 1758)
- Jujubinus obscurus Thiele, J., 1930: synonym of Cantharidus polychroma (Adams, A., 1853)
- Jujubinus orientalis Nordsieck, F: synonym of Jujubinus elenchoides (Issel, A., 1878); synonym of Jujubinus striatus (Linnaeus, 1758)
- Jujubinus parvosiculus Ghisotti & Melone, 1975: synonym of Jujubinus gravinae (Dautzenberg, 1881)
- Jujubinus parvulus Brusina, S.: synonym of Jujubinus striatus (Linnaeus, 1758)
- Jujubinus parvulus Philippi, R.A: synonym of Jujubinus montagui (Wood, W., 1828)
- Jujubinus propinquis Monterosato, T.A. de M. di: synonym of Jujubinus striatus (Linnaeus, 1758)
- Jujubinus propinquus Ghisotti & Melone, 1975: synonym of Jujubinus striatus (Linnaeus, 1758)
- Jujubinus smaragdinus (Monterosato, 1880): synonym of Jujubinus striatus (Linnaeus, 1758)
- Jujubinus suturalis (A. Adams, 1853): synonym of Prothalotia suturalis (A. Adams, 1853)
