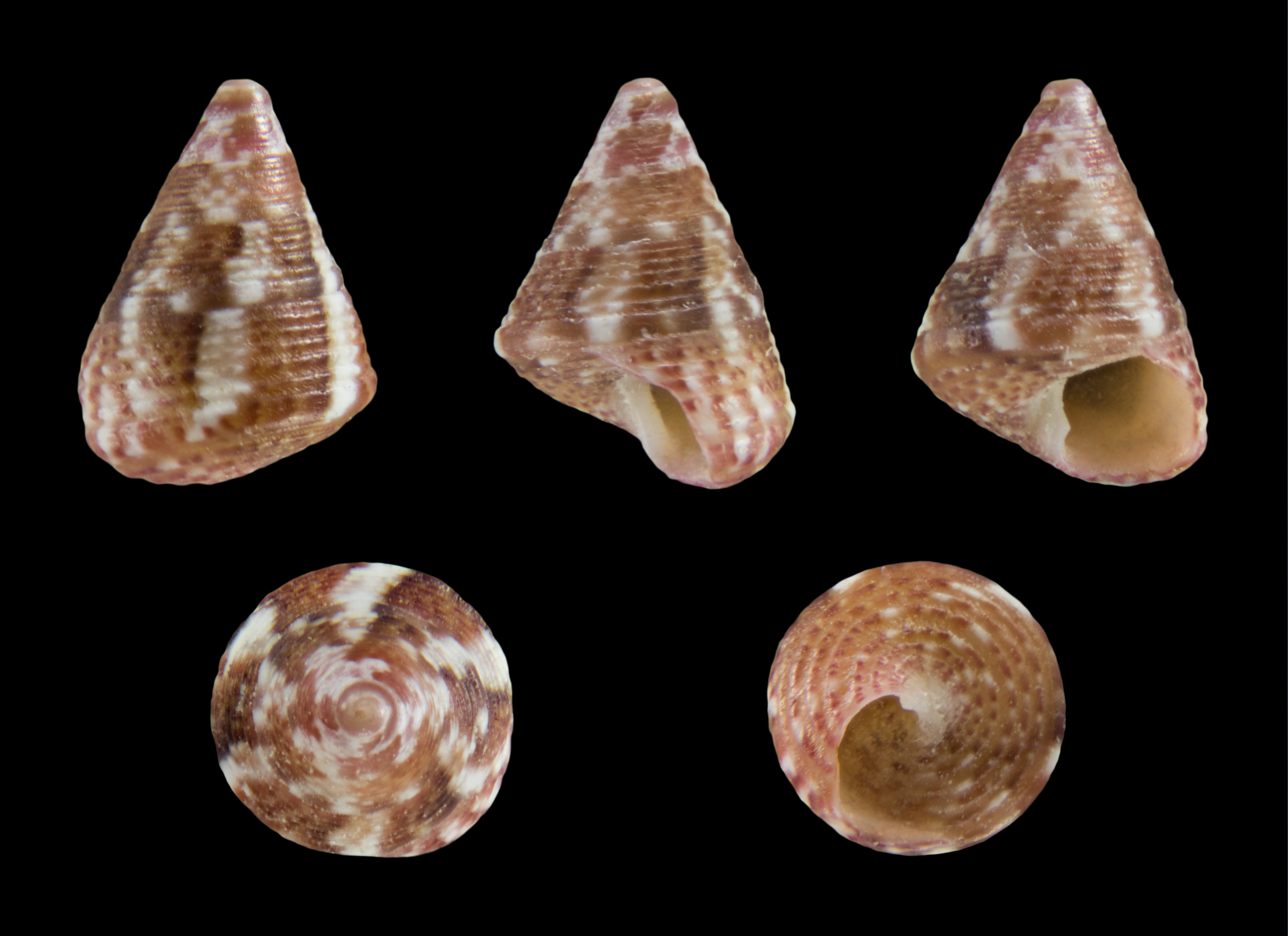

Scientific classification
- Kingdom: Animalia
- Phylum: Mollusca
- Class: Gastropoda
- Subclass: Vetigastropoda
- Order: Trochida
- Superfamily: Trochoidea
- Family: Trochidae
- Genus: Jujubinus
- Species: J. striatus

Binomial name
- Jujubinus striatus (Linnaeus, 1758)

Synonyms
- See: List of synonyms

= Jujubinus striatus =

Species of gastropod

Jujubinus striatus, commonly known as the grooved top shell, is a species of sea snail, a marine gastropod mollusk in the family Trochidae, the top snails.

Subspecies include:

- Jujubinus striatus delpreteanus (Sulliotti, 1889)
- Jujubinus striatus striatus (Linnaeus, 1758)

== Description ==
The size of the shell varies between 6 mm and 13 mm. The small, imperforate, solid shell has an elongate-conical shape. It is brown or yellowish olive, rarely unicolored, striped or lined longitudinally with white, sometimes the striping broken into a tessellated pattern. The surface is dull or shining. The whorls show a much less prominent ridge at the periphery than in Jujubinus exasperatus. The supra-sutural fasciole when discernible, is not projecting nor prominent. The whorls are encircled by numerous subequal lirulae. The interstices are slightly or strongly obliquely striate. The base of the shell contains numerous striae or riblets, about double the number possessed by Jujubinus exasperatus.

This species is distinguished from Jujubinus exasperatus, a species of nearly the same size and outline, by its finer more numerous spiral striae, and a less strongly truncate columella.

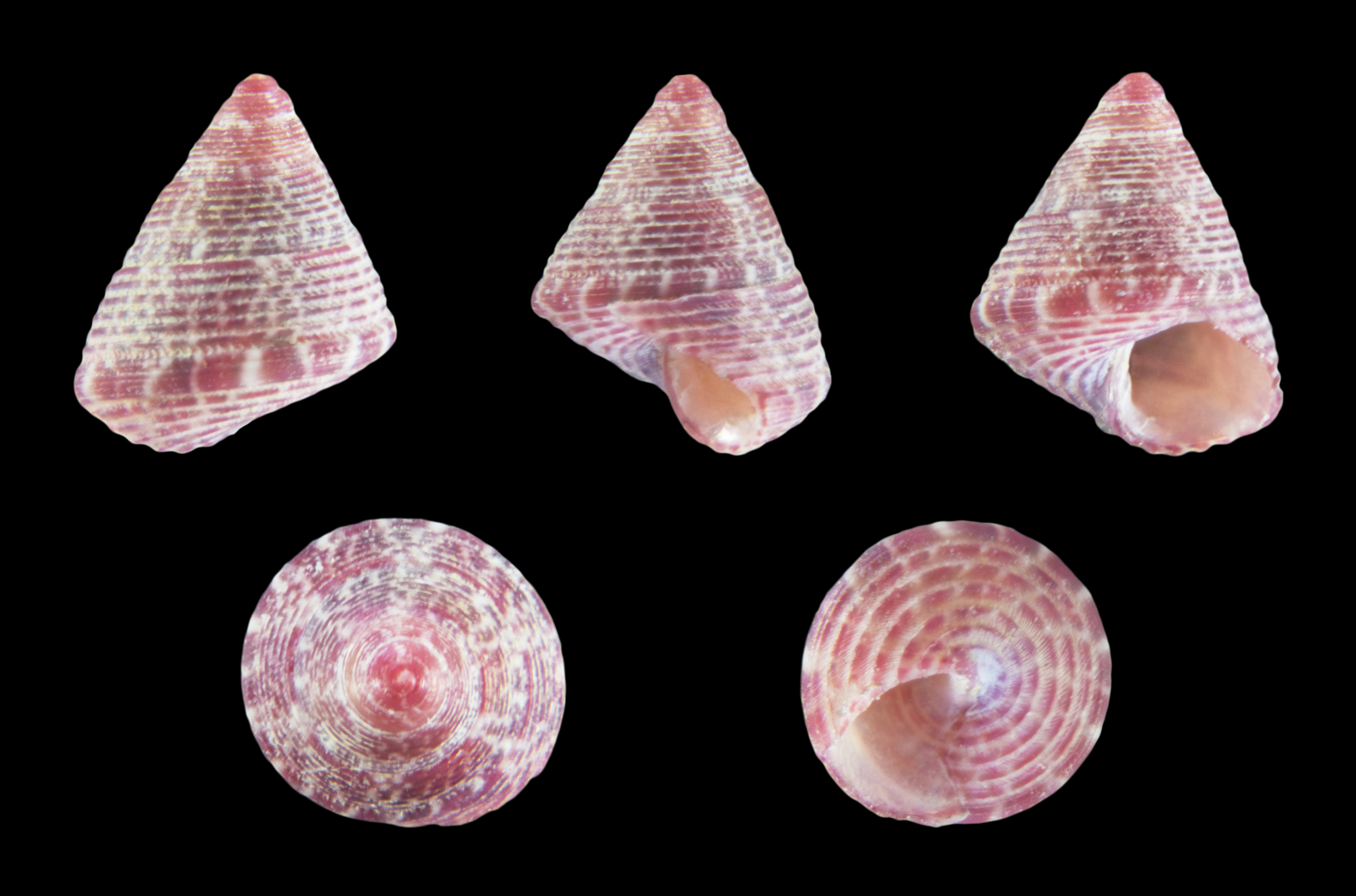
Jujubinus striatus depictus Deshayes, 1833

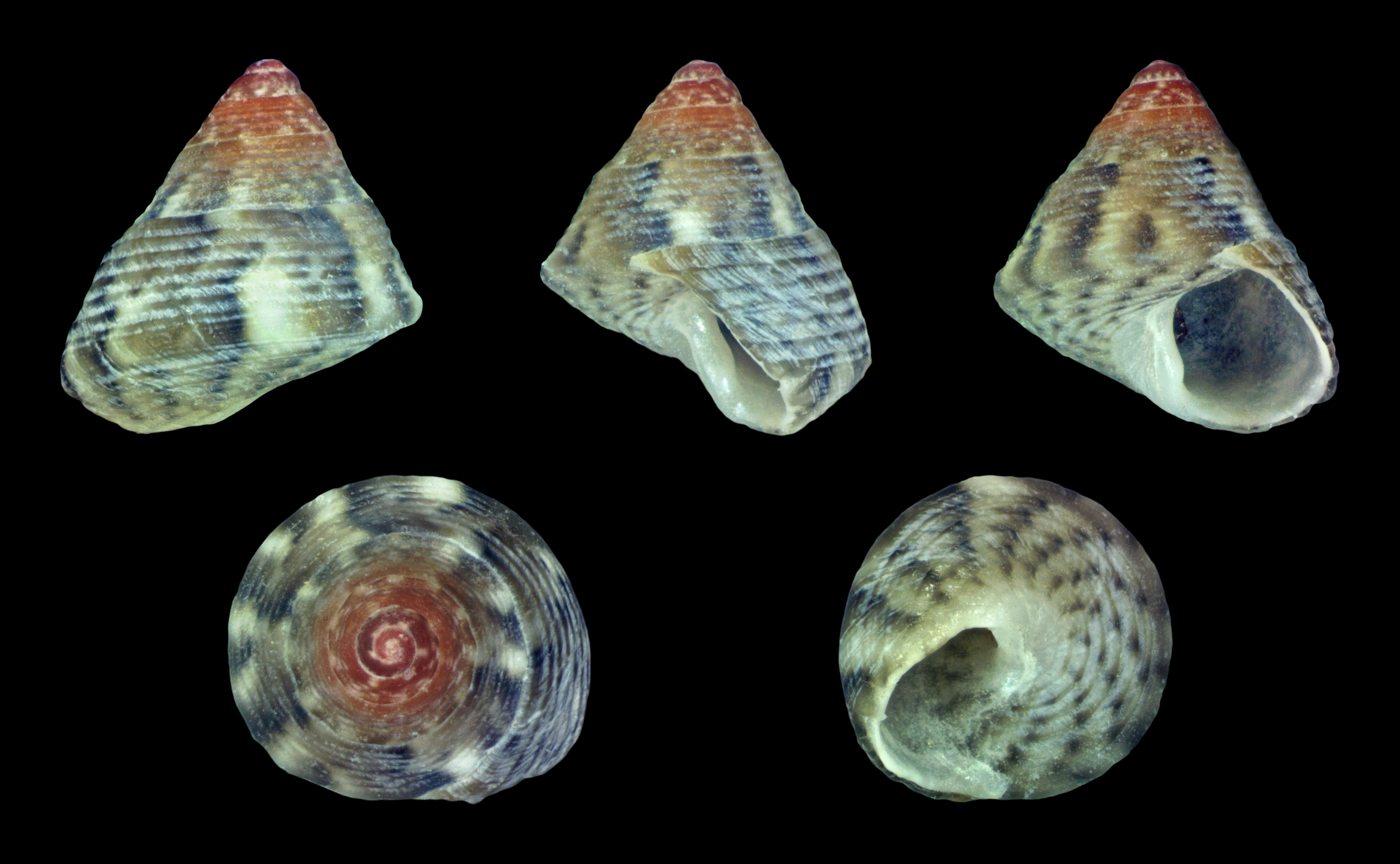
Jujubinus striatus smaragdinus (Dautzenberg, 1833)

== Distribution ==
This species occurs in the English Channel, the Atlantic Ocean from France to the Azores and the Canary Islands and Madeira; and in the Mediterranean Sea. In the Irish Sea it was recorded in the Langness Marine Nature Reserve off the Isle of Man in 2019; the first Manx record since Edward Forbes first recorded there it in 1838.

== List of synonyms ==
- Calliostoma striatum (Linnaeus, 1758)
- Jujubinus altior Coen, 1937
- Jujubinus brugnonei Coen, 1937
- Jujubinus decipiens Parenzan, 1970 (dubious synonym)
- Jujubinus defiorei Coen, 1937
- Jujubinus delpreteanus Sulliotti, 1889
- Jujubinus depictus (Deshayes, 1835)
- Jujubinus depictus var. phasiana Pallary 1906
- Jujubinus depictus var. funerea Sulliotti 1889
- Jujubinus depictus var. hieroglyphica Sulliotti 1889
- Jujubinus depictus var. ligata Sulliotti 1889
- Jujubinus depictus var. rubra Sulliotti 1889
- Jujubinus elenchoides (Issel, 1878)
- Jujubinus elenchoides orientalis Nordsieck, 1973
- Jujubinus fraterculus var. atra Pallary 1906
- Jujubinus fraterculus var. fuscoviolacea Pallary 1904
- Jujubinus fraterculus var. marmorata Pallary 1906
- Jujubinus fraterculus var. minor Pallary 1906
- Jujubinus goniobasis Coen, 1937
- Jujubinus magnificus Coen, 1937
- Jujubinus multistriatus Ghisotti & Melone, 1975
- Jujubinus propinquus Ghisotti & Melone, 1975 (dubious synonym)
- Jujubinus smaragdinus (Monterosato, 1880)
- Trochus cingulatus Grube, 1839
- Trochus conicus Donovan, 1803
- Trochus depictus Deshayes, 1835
- Trochus depictus var. ardens Sulliotti 1889
- Trochus depictus var. atrata Sulliotti 1889
- Trochus depictus var. elegans Sulliotti 1889
- Trochus depictus var. flava Sulliotti 1889
- Trochus elenchoides Monterosato
- Trochus fraterculus Monterosato 1880
- Trochus gravesi Forbes, 1844
- Trochus littoralis Brusina, 1865
- Trochus parvulus Brusina 1865
- Trochus parvus Costa, E.M. da
- Trochus sartorii Aradas & Benoit 1841
- Trochus scacchi Aradas 1846
- Trochus sericeus Pallary 1904
- Trochus smaragdinus Monterosato, 1883
- Trochus smaragdinus var. albina Bucquoy, Dautzenberg & Dollfus 1884
- Trochus smaragdinus var. aurea Dautzenberg 1883
- Trochus striatus (Linnaeus, 1758)
- Trochus striatus var. elenchoides Issel 1878
- Trochus striatus var. smaragdina Monterosato 1880
- Zizyphinus (Jujubinus) aequistriatus Monterosato, 1884
