= Jujubinus pseudogravinae =

Scientific classification
- Kingdom: Animalia
- Phylum: Mollusca
- Class: Gastropoda
- Subclass: Vetigastropoda
- Order: Trochida
- Superfamily: Trochoidea
- Family: Trochidae
- Genus: Jujubinus
- Species: J. pseudogravinae

Binomial name
- Jujubinus pseudogravinae Nordsieck, 1973

Species of gastropod

Jujubinus pseudogravinae is a species of sea snail, a marine gastropod mollusk in the family Trochidae, the top snails. It occurs in the Atlantic Ocean off the Azores, and the size of the shell varies between 3 mm and 7.5 mm.

Some consider this species a synonym of Jujubinus gravinae gravinae (Dautzenberg, Ph., 1881).
