= Jujubinus pseudoturricula =

Scientific classification
- Kingdom: Animalia
- Phylum: Mollusca
- Class: Gastropoda
- Subclass: Vetigastropoda
- Order: Trochida
- Family: Trochidae
- Genus: Jujubinus
- Species: †J. pseudoturricula

Binomial name
- †Jujubinus pseudoturricula (Dollfus & Dautzenberg, 1886)

Species of gastropod

Jujubinus pseudoturricula is a species of extinct sea snail, a marine gastropod mollusk in the family Trochidae, which are the top snails.

Jujubinus guanchus, a living species, closely resembles J. pseudoturricula in its number of spirals. The spirals of this species, four in number, have incised sutures with a "prominent axial sculpture".
