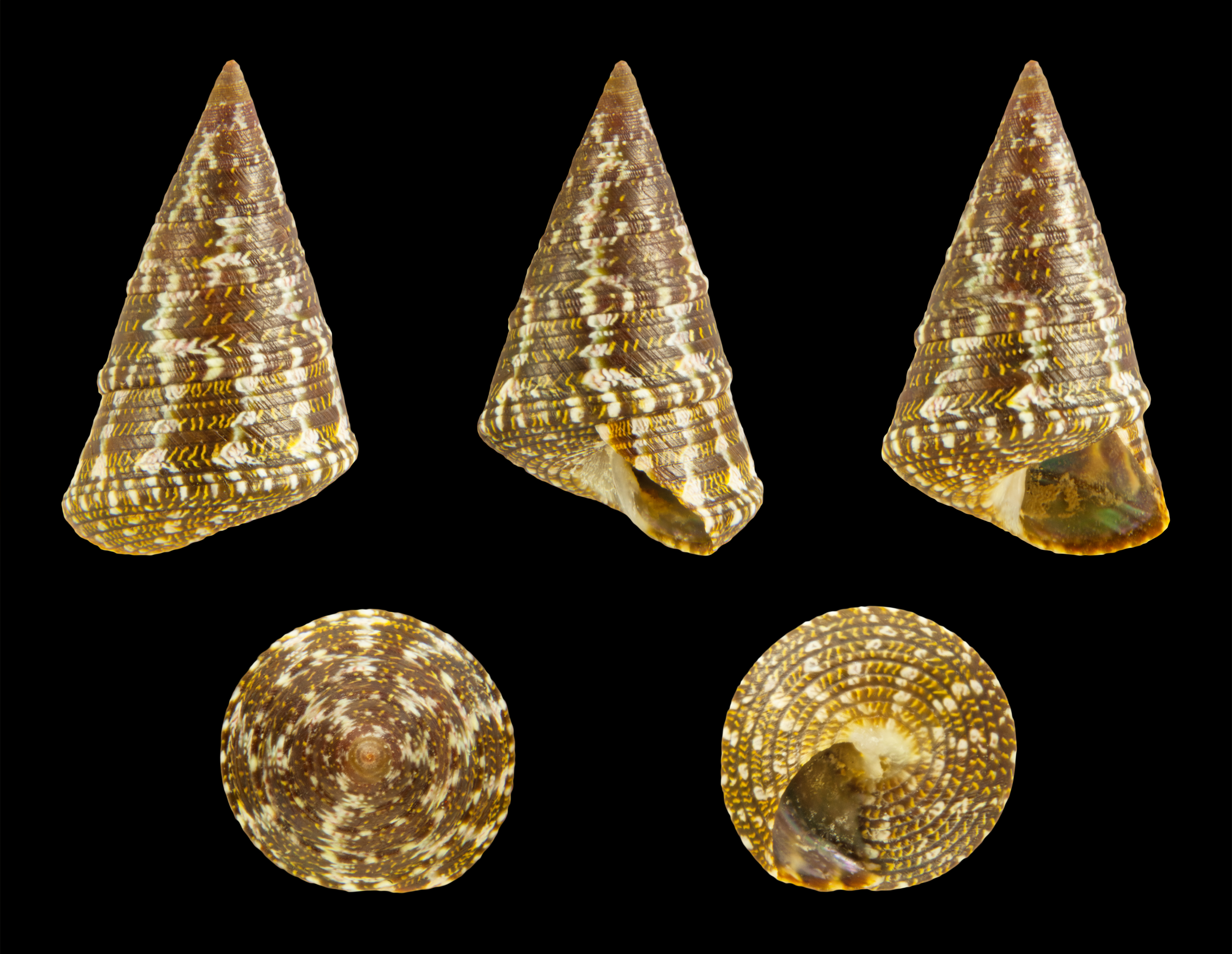
- Shell of Jujubinus polychroma

Scientific classification
- Kingdom: Animalia
- Phylum: Mollusca
- Class: Gastropoda
- Subclass: Vetigastropoda
- Order: Trochida
- Family: Trochidae
- Genus: Jujubinus
- Species: J. polychroma

Binomial name
- Jujubinus polychroma (A. Adams, 1853)

Synonyms
- Calliostoma polychroma (A. Adams, 1853); Cantharidus (Jujubinus) tristis Thiele, 1930; Cantharidus (Thalotia) polychroma (A. Adams, 1853); Cantharidus polychroma (A. Adams, 1853); Cantharidus polychromus [sic] (misspelling); Cantharidus tristis Thiele, 1930; Ziziphinus polychroma A. Adams, 1853 superseded combination; Ziziphinus polychromus [sic] (misspelling)

= Jujubinus polychroma =

Species of gastropod

Jujubinus polychroma is a species of sea snail, a marine gastropod mollusk in the family Trochidae, the top snails.

== Description ==
The shell is turreted-conic, perforate, and green, adorned with undulating white bands interspersed with angular buff-colored lines. The whorls are flat and slightly overlapping (subimbricating), featuring a slightly prominent, articulated margin. They are further ornamented with subdistant, impressed transverse lines and fine longitudinal striations.

The body whorl is angulate, with a slightly convex base sculptured by articulated cinguli in buff tones. The aperture is subquadrate and green on the inside. The columella is straight and slightly truncated at the base.

== Distribution ==
This marine species occurs in the Indo-west Pacific, from the Persian Gulf to the Philippines; off Australia (Northern Territory, Queensland, Western Australia).
