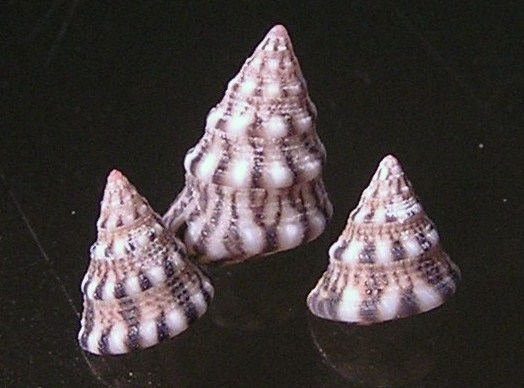
- Jujubinus unindentatus

Scientific classification
- Kingdom: Animalia
- Phylum: Mollusca
- Class: Gastropoda
- Subclass: Vetigastropoda
- Order: Trochida
- Superfamily: Trochoidea
- Family: Trochidae
- Genus: Jujubinus
- Species: J. unidentatus

Binomial name
- Jujubinus unidentatus (Philippi, 1844)

Synonyms
- Jujubinus africanus Nordsieck, 1973; Jujubinus fulguratus Pallary, 1906 (dubious synonym); Trochus unidentatus Philippi, 1844; Trochus venosus Megerle von Mühlfeld, 1816

= Jujubinus unidentatus =

Species of gastropod

Jujubinus unidentatus is a species of sea snail, a marine gastropod mollusk in the family Trochidae, the top snails. It occurs in the Mediterranean Sea off Tunisia, and the size of the shell varies between 6 mm and 13 mm.
