= Jujubinus altavillae =

Scientific classification
- Kingdom: Animalia
- Phylum: Mollusca
- Class: Gastropoda
- Subclass: Vetigastropoda
- Order: Trochida
- Family: Trochidae
- Genus: Jujubinus
- Species: †J. altavillae

Binomial name
- †Jujubinus altavillae Giannuzzi-Savelli & Reina, 1987

Species of gastropod

Jujubinus altavillae is a species of extinct sea snail, a marine gastropod mollusk in the family Trochidae, the top snails.

Fossils were found in Pliocene strata of Altavilla Milicia, Palermo, Italy.
