= Jujubinus poppei =

Scientific classification
- Kingdom: Animalia
- Phylum: Mollusca
- Class: Gastropoda
- Subclass: Vetigastropoda
- Order: Trochida
- Superfamily: Trochoidea
- Family: Trochidae
- Genus: Jujubinus
- Species: J. poppei

Binomial name
- Jujubinus poppei Curini-Galletti, 1985

Synonyms
- Bulla triticea Couthouy, 1838

Species of gastropod

Jujubinus poppei is a species of sea snail, a marine gastropod mollusk in the family Trochidae, the top snails. It occurs in the Atlantic Ocean off the Canary Islands. The height of the shell attains 3.5 mm.
