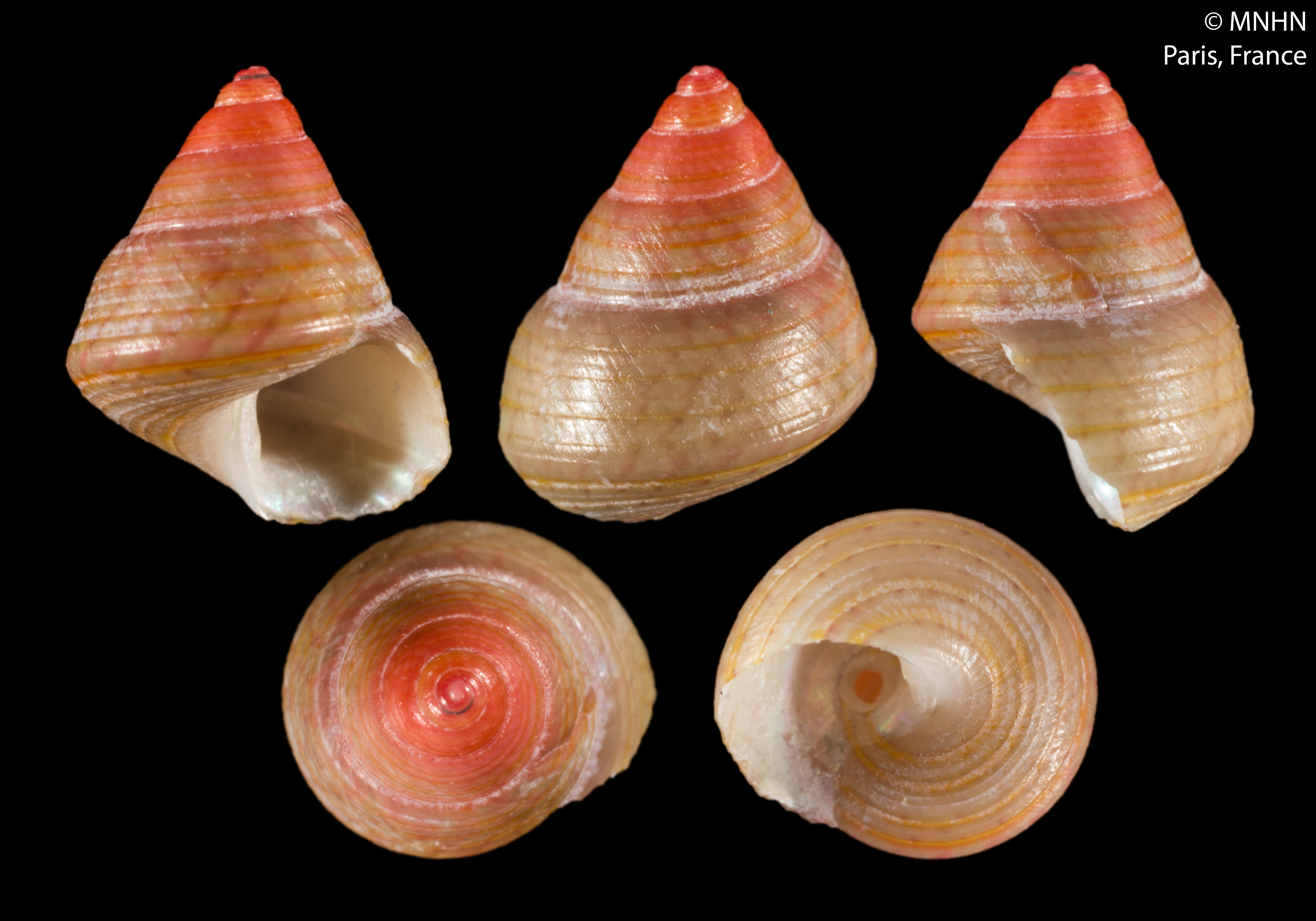

Scientific classification
- Kingdom: Animalia
- Phylum: Mollusca
- Class: Gastropoda
- Subclass: Vetigastropoda
- Order: Trochida
- Family: Trochidae
- Genus: Jujubinus
- Species: J. trilloi

Binomial name
- Jujubinus trilloi Smriglio, Di Giulio & Mariottini, 2014

= Jujubinus trilloi =

Species of gastropod

Jujubinus trilloi is a species of sea snail, a marine gastropod mollusk in the family Trochidae, the top snails.
