= Jujubinus zukowcensis =

Scientific classification
- Kingdom: Animalia
- Phylum: Mollusca
- Class: Gastropoda
- Subclass: Vetigastropoda
- Order: Trochida
- Family: Trochidae
- Genus: Jujubinus
- Species: †J. zukowcensis

Binomial name
- †Jujubinus zukowcensis (Andrzejowski, 1833)

Species of gastropod

Jujubinus zukowcensis is a species of extinct sea snail, a marine gastropod mollusk in the family Trochidae, which are the top snails.
