= Jujubinus browningleeae =

Scientific classification
- Kingdom: Animalia
- Phylum: Mollusca
- Class: Gastropoda
- Subclass: Vetigastropoda
- Order: Trochida
- Family: Trochidae
- Genus: Jujubinus
- Species: J. browningleeae

Binomial name
- Jujubinus browningleeae Smriglio, Mariottini & Swinnen, 2018

Species of gastropod

Jujubinus browningleeae is a species of sea snail, a marine gastropod mollusk in the family Trochidae, the top snails.

== Etymology ==
This species is named after Mrs. Sarah Browning-Lee in recognition of her continuous effort over a period of three years in collecting sand or sediment samples in the marine environment of Ascension Island for the identification of micro mollusks.

== Description ==
Jujubinus browningleeae has a small and slightly turriculate shell. The sculpture consists of flat spiral cords demarcated by incised spiral lines. Prosocline lamallae is absent between cords.

== Distribution ==
It is found in the Portuguese exclusive economic zone.

== See also ==
- Jujubinus
