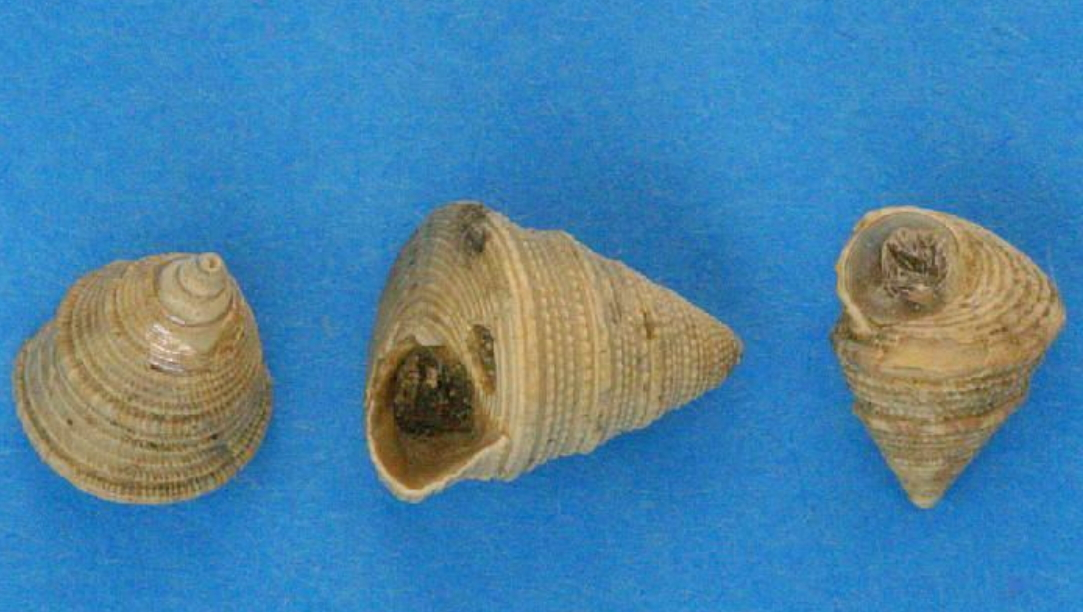
- Shell of Jujubinus turricula (specimen at the International Fossil Shell Museum)

Scientific classification
- Kingdom: Animalia
- Phylum: Mollusca
- Class: Gastropoda
- Subclass: Vetigastropoda
- Order: Trochida
- Family: Trochidae
- Genus: Jujubinus
- Species: †J. turricula

Binomial name
- †Jujubinus turricula (Eichwald, 1830)

Synonyms
- † Calliostoma (Jujubinus) turricula (Eichwald, 1830); † Trochus turricula Eichwald, 1830 † superseded combination

= Jujubinus turricula =

Species of gastropod

Jujubinus turricula is a species of extinct sea snail, a marine gastropod mollusk in the family Trochidae, the top snails. Fossils were found in Miocene strata in Pyrénées-Atlantiques, France.
