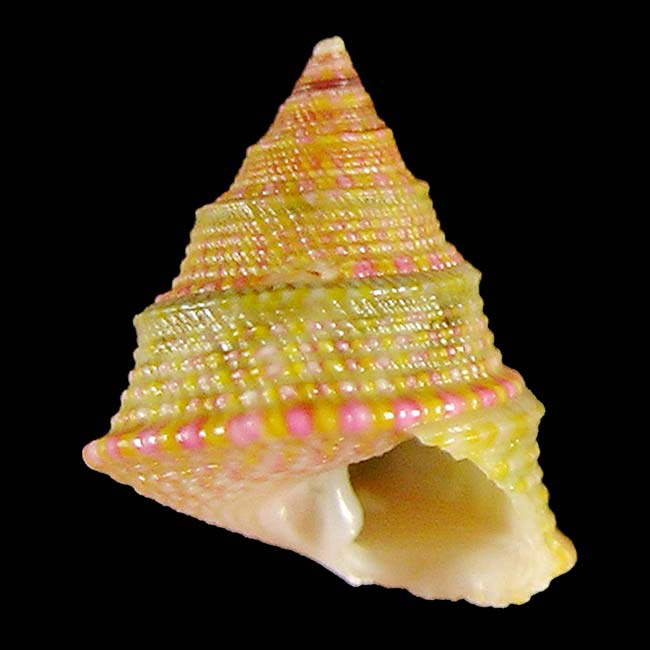

Scientific classification
- Kingdom: Animalia
- Phylum: Mollusca
- Class: Gastropoda
- Subclass: Vetigastropoda
- Order: Trochida
- Superfamily: Trochoidea
- Family: Trochidae
- Genus: Jujubinus
- Species: J. hubrechti

Binomial name
- Jujubinus hubrechti Poppe, Tagaro & Dekker, 2006

= Jujubinus hubrechti =

Species of mollusc

Jujubinus hubrechti is a species of sea snail, a marine gastropod mollusk in the family Trochidae, the top snails. It occurs off the Philippines.

The height of the shell attains 7 mm.
