= Jujubinus silbogomerus =

Scientific classification
- Kingdom: Animalia
- Phylum: Mollusca
- Class: Gastropoda
- Subclass: Vetigastropoda
- Order: Trochida
- Family: Trochidae
- Genus: Jujubinus
- Species: J. silbogomerus

Binomial name
- Jujubinus silbogomerus Smriglio, Mariottini & Swinnen, 2019

Species of gastropod

Jujubinus silbogomerus is a species of sea snail, a marine gastropod mollusk in the family Trochidae, the top snails. It occurs off the Canary Islands, and the small conical shell attains a height of 2.8 mm and a width of 2.8 mm.
