= Jujubinus gilberti =

Scientific classification
- Kingdom: Animalia
- Phylum: Mollusca
- Class: Gastropoda
- Subclass: Vetigastropoda
- Order: Trochida
- Family: Trochidae
- Genus: Jujubinus
- Species: J. gilberti

Binomial name
- Jujubinus gilberti (Montrouzier, 1878)

Species of gastropod

Jujubinus gilberti is a species of sea snail, a marine gastropod mollusk in the family Trochidae, the top snails.
