= Jujubinus catenatus =

Scientific classification
- Kingdom: Animalia
- Phylum: Mollusca
- Class: Gastropoda
- Subclass: Vetigastropoda
- Order: Trochida
- Superfamily: Trochoidea
- Family: Trochidae
- Genus: Jujubinus
- Species: J. catenatus

Binomial name
- Jujubinus catenatus Ardovini, 2006

Species of gastropod

Jujubinus catenatus is a species of sea snail, a marine gastropod mollusk in the family Trochidae, the top snails. It was first described by Ardovini in 2006, based on specimens collected from the Sicily Channel at depths between 45 and 70 meters. The species' shell is conical, with spiral ribs and axial striae. The color is brownish-red, with white spots on the ribs. The shell's height is about 6.5 mm.

Jujubinus catenatus belongs to the subfamily Cantharidinae, which includes other small trochids with similar morphology and ecology. This species is endemic to the Mediterranean Sea, where it lives on rocky substrates and feeds on algae and detritus.
