= Jujubinus augustoi =

Scientific classification
- Kingdom: Animalia
- Phylum: Mollusca
- Class: Gastropoda
- Subclass: Vetigastropoda
- Order: Trochida
- Superfamily: Trochoidea
- Family: Trochidae
- Genus: Jujubinus
- Species: J. augustoi

Binomial name
- Jujubinus augustoi Rolan & Gori, 2009

Species of gastropod

Jujubinus augustoi is an endemic species of sea snail, a marine gastropod mollusk in the family Trochidae, the top snails.

This species occurs in the Atlantic Ocean off São Tomé and Príncipe in the island of São Tomé.
