= Jujubinus dispar =

Scientific classification
- Domain: Eukaryota
- Kingdom: Animalia
- Phylum: Mollusca
- Class: Gastropoda
- Subclass: Vetigastropoda
- Order: Trochida
- Superfamily: Trochoidea
- Family: Trochidae
- Genus: Jujubinus
- Species: J. dispar

Binomial name
- Jujubinus dispar Curini-Galletti, 1982

Species of gastropod

Jujubinus dispar is a species of sea snail, a marine gastropod mollusk in the family Trochidae, the top snails. This species occurs off the Strait of Gibraltar and off Morocco.

J. dispar's shell height attains 5 mm.
