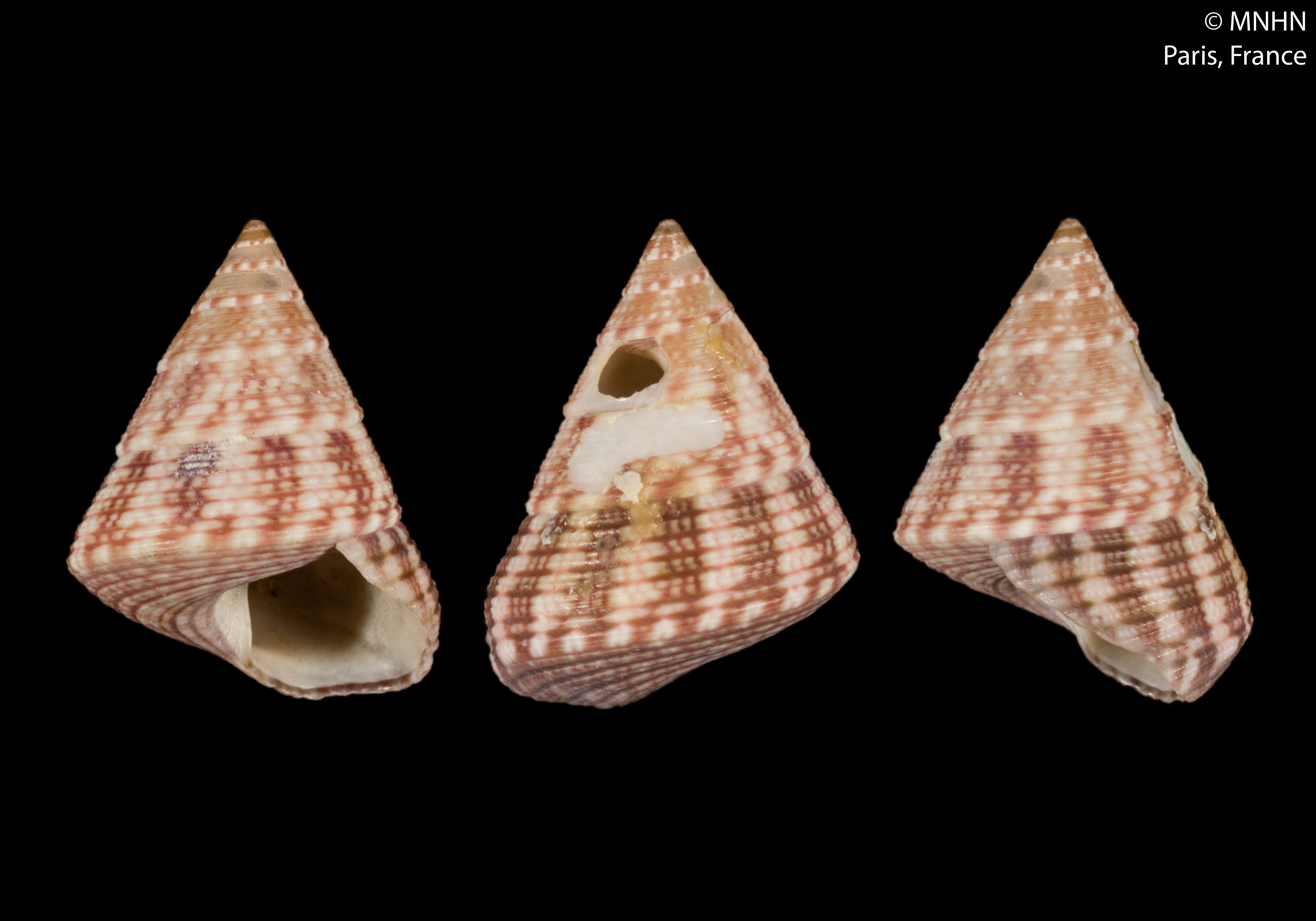
- Shell of Jujubinus suarezensis (syntype at MNHN, Paris)

Scientific classification
- Kingdom: Animalia
- Phylum: Mollusca
- Class: Gastropoda
- Subclass: Vetigastropoda
- Order: Trochida
- Superfamily: Trochoidea
- Family: Trochidae
- Genus: Jujubinus
- Species: J. suarezensis

Binomial name
- Jujubinus suarezensis (P. Fischer, 1878)

Synonyms
- Caliiostoma bisculptum E. A. Smith, 1906; Calliostoma interrupta (non Wood, 1828): Spry, 1968 Macnae & Kalk, 1969; Cantharidus farquhari Sowerby, G.B. III, 1892; Cantharidus fultoni (partim) Barnard, 1963; Cantharidus suarezensis (P. Fischer, 1878); Trochus suarezensis Fischer, 1878 (original combination)

= Jujubinus suarezensis =

Species of gastropod

Jujubinus suarezensis is a species of sea snail, a marine gastropod mollusk in the family Trochidae, the top snails.

Subspecies include:

- † Jujubinus suarezensis fultoni (G. B. Sowerby III, 1890) (synonyms: Calliostoma stenomphalum (G. B. Sowerby III, 1890), Cantharidus fultoni (G. B. Sowerby III, 1890) †, Cantharidus suarezensis fultoni (G. B. Sowerby III, 1890) †, Trochus (Calliostoma) fultoni G. B. Sowerby III, 1890 † (basionym), Trochus fultoni G. B. Sowerby III, 1890 † (original combination), Trochus stenomphalus G. B. Sowerby III, 1890 (junior synonym) )
- Jujubinus suarezensis suarezensis (P. Fischer, 1878) (synonym: Cantharidus suarezensis suarezensis (P. Fischer, 1878) )

== Description ==
The size of the shell varies between 10 mm and 18 mm, the diameter is up to 13 mm. The narrowly perforate shell has a conic-acute shape. The 9 to 10 whorls are planulate. The embryonic whorls are smooth, buff, the remaining whitish-buff. The whorls are ornamented with longitudinal wavy streaks of brown or rosy, and sometimes spiral zones. They are spirally lirate with 7 lirae on the penultimate whorl, upper and lower ones most prominent, the intermediate 5 slightly granose. The interstices are sharply obliquely striate. The body whorl is angular, convex beneath and contains about 8 concentric lirae. The aperture subquadrate. The lip is acute. The columella is subtruncate. The parietal wall bears a callus in adults.

== Distribution ==
This marine species occurs in Madagascar.
