= Jujubinus mabelae =

Scientific classification
- Kingdom: Animalia
- Phylum: Mollusca
- Class: Gastropoda
- Subclass: Vetigastropoda
- Order: Trochida
- Superfamily: Trochoidea
- Family: Trochidae
- Genus: Jujubinus
- Species: J. mabelae

Binomial name
- Jujubinus mabelae Rolan & Swinnen, 2009

Species of gastropod

Jujubinus mabelae is a species of sea snail, a marine gastropod mollusk in the family Trochidae, the top snails. This species occurs in the Atlantic Ocean off the Canary Islands at depths between 5 m and 27 m.
