= Jujubinus hernandezi =

Scientific classification
- Kingdom: Animalia
- Phylum: Mollusca
- Class: Gastropoda
- Subclass: Vetigastropoda
- Order: Trochida
- Superfamily: Trochoidea
- Family: Trochidae
- Genus: Jujubinus
- Species: J. hernandezi

Binomial name
- Jujubinus hernandezi Rolan & Swinnen, 2009

Species of gastropod

Jujubinus hernandezi is a species of sea snail, a marine gastropod mollusk in the family Trochidae, the top snails. It occurs in the Atlantic Ocean off the Canary Islands.
