= Jujubinus punctulatus =

Scientific classification
- Kingdom: Animalia
- Phylum: Mollusca
- Class: Gastropoda
- Subclass: Vetigastropoda
- Order: Trochida
- Family: Trochidae
- Genus: Jujubinus
- Species: †J. punctulatus

Binomial name
- †Jujubinus punctulatus (Dujardin 1837)

Synonyms
- Trochus punctulatus Dujardin, 1837

Species of gastropod

Jujubinus punctulatus is a species of extinct sea snail, a marine gastropod mollusk in the family Trochidae, the top snails.

J. punctulatas has a conical shell, with crenulated transverse striae and a strong beaded rib at the margin of the whirls, with a white interior. The shell is similar to Jujubinus mimus in size but is narrower in its proportion to its length, with stronger transverse striae and the rib at the margin of the whirls being more elevated.
