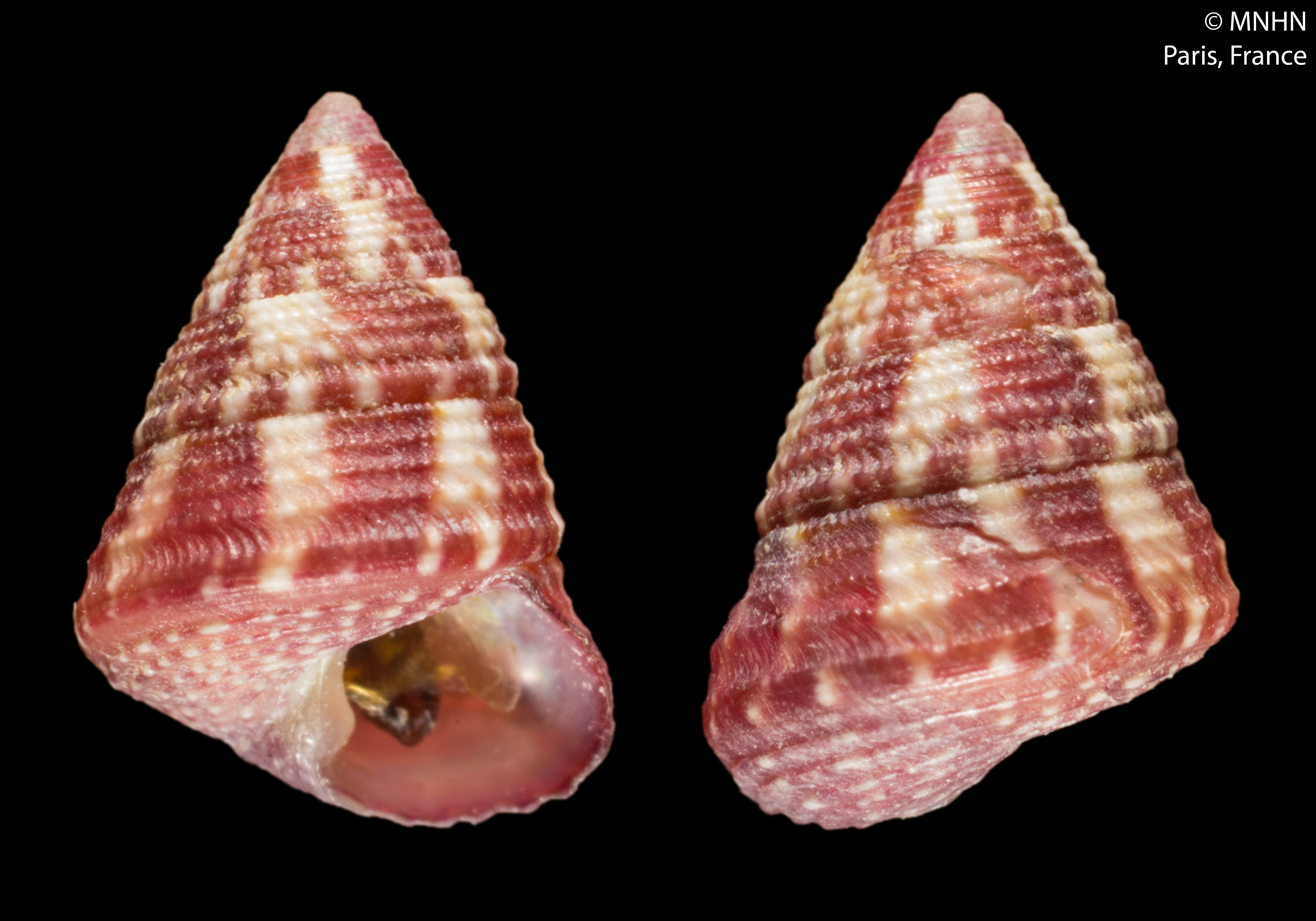
- Shell of Jujubinus fulgor (holotype at MNHN, Paris)

Scientific classification
- Kingdom: Animalia
- Phylum: Mollusca
- Class: Gastropoda
- Subclass: Vetigastropoda
- Order: Trochida
- Superfamily: Trochoidea
- Family: Trochidae
- Genus: Jujubinus
- Species: J. fulgor

Binomial name
- Jujubinus fulgor Gofas, 1991

= Jujubinus fulgor =

Species of mollusc

Jujubinus fulgor is a species of sea snail, a marine gastropod mollusk in the family Trochidae, the top snails. It occurs in the Atlantic Ocean off Angola.

The height of the shell attains 5 mm.
