= Jujubinus ruscurianus =

Scientific classification
- Kingdom: Animalia
- Phylum: Mollusca
- Class: Gastropoda
- Subclass: Vetigastropoda
- Order: Trochida
- Superfamily: Trochoidea
- Family: Trochidae
- Genus: Jujubinus
- Species: J. ruscurianus

Binomial name
- Jujubinus ruscurianus (Weinkauff, 1868)

Synonyms
- Jujubinus kochi Nordsieck, 1973; Jujubinus ruscurianus var. flammulata Pallary 1920; Jujubinus ruscurianus var. purpurea Pallary 1920; Trochus ruscurianus Weinkauff, 1868 (original description)

Species of gastropod

Jujubinus ruscurianus is a species of sea snail, a marine gastropod mollusk in the family Trochidae, the top snails. It occurs in the Atlantic Ocean off Portugal and Morocco, in the Alboran Sea, and in the Western Mediterranean Sea.

The size of the shell varies between 4 mm and 7 mm.
