= Jujubinus tingitanus =

Scientific classification
- Kingdom: Animalia
- Phylum: Mollusca
- Class: Gastropoda
- Subclass: Vetigastropoda
- Order: Trochida
- Family: Trochidae
- Genus: Jujubinus
- Species: J. tingitanus

Binomial name
- Jujubinus tingitanus (Pallary, 1902)

Species of gastropod

Jujubinus tingitanus is a species of sea snail, a marine gastropod mollusk in the family Trochidae, the top snails.
