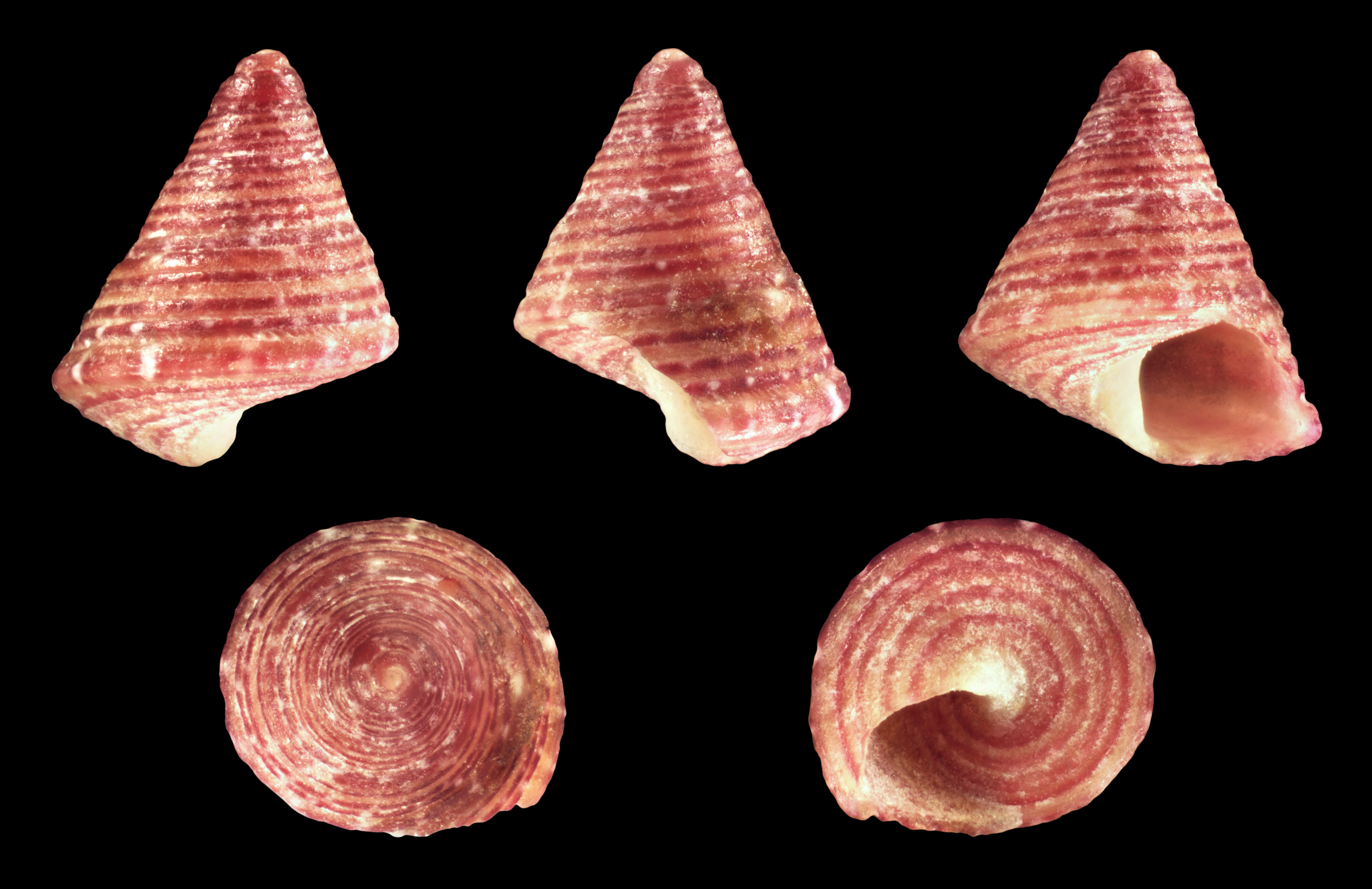

Scientific classification
- Kingdom: Animalia
- Phylum: Mollusca
- Class: Gastropoda
- Subclass: Vetigastropoda
- Order: Trochida
- Family: Trochidae
- Genus: Jujubinus
- Species: J. errinae

Binomial name
- Jujubinus errinae Smriglio, Mariottini & Giacobbe, 2016

= Jujubinus errinae =

Species of gastropod

Jujubinus errinae is a species of sea snail, a marine gastropod mollusk in the family Trochidae, the top snails.
