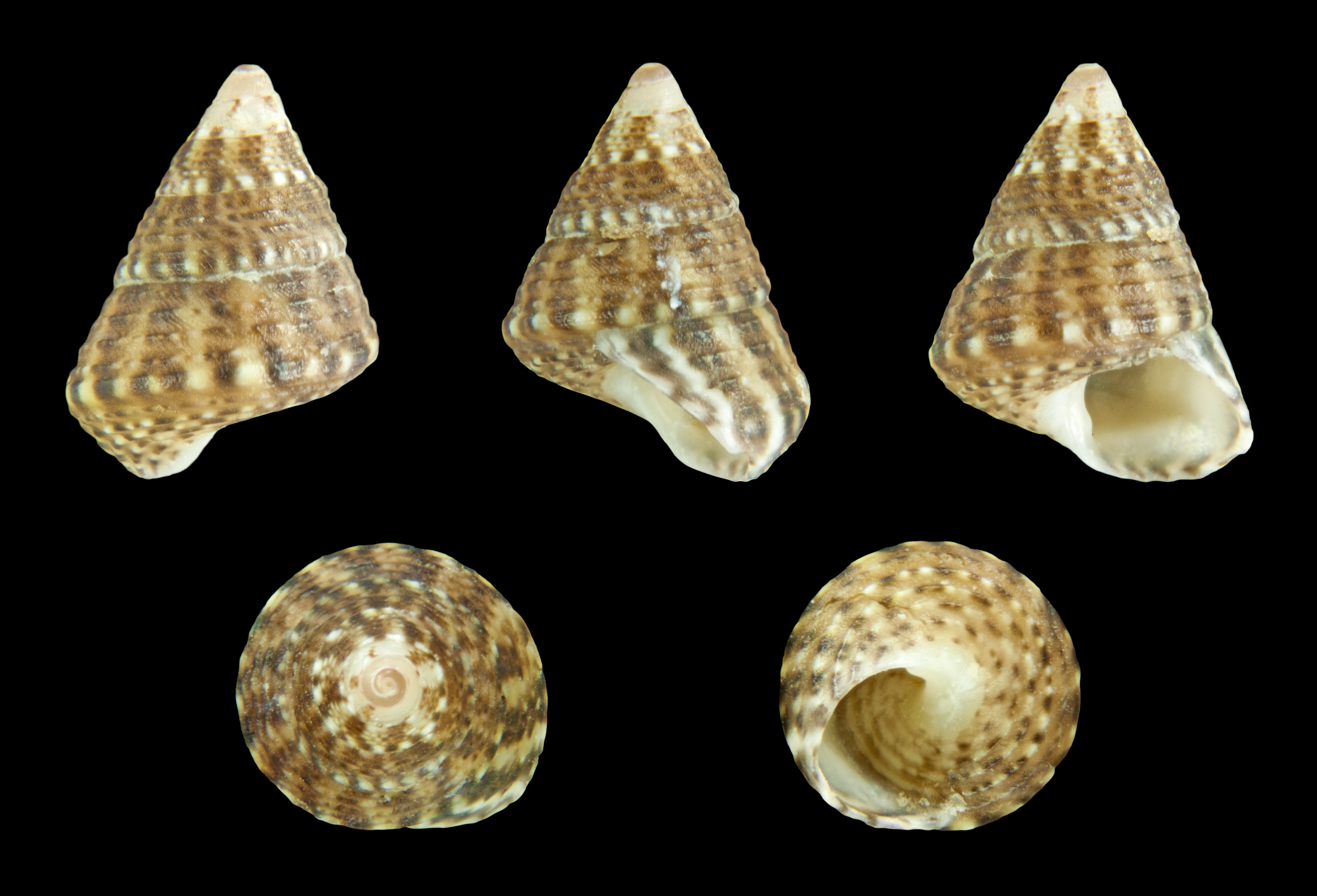

Scientific classification
- Kingdom: Animalia
- Phylum: Mollusca
- Class: Gastropoda
- Subclass: Vetigastropoda
- Order: Trochida
- Superfamily: Trochoidea
- Family: Trochidae
- Genus: Jujubinus
- Species: J. baudoni

Binomial name
- Jujubinus baudoni (Monterosato, 1891)

Synonyms
- Jujubinus baudouini [sic] (misspelling of Jujubinus baudoni; Jujubinus baudouini incomparabilis Ghisotti & Melone, 1975; Trochus baudoni Monterosato, 1891 (original combination)

= Jujubinus baudoni =

Species of gastropod

Jujubinus baudoni is a species of sea snail, a marine gastropod mollusk in the family Trochidae, the top snails. The size of the shell varies between 3.5 mm and 8 mm.

This species occurs in the Mediterranean Sea and in the Atlantic Ocean off Spain and Portugal.
