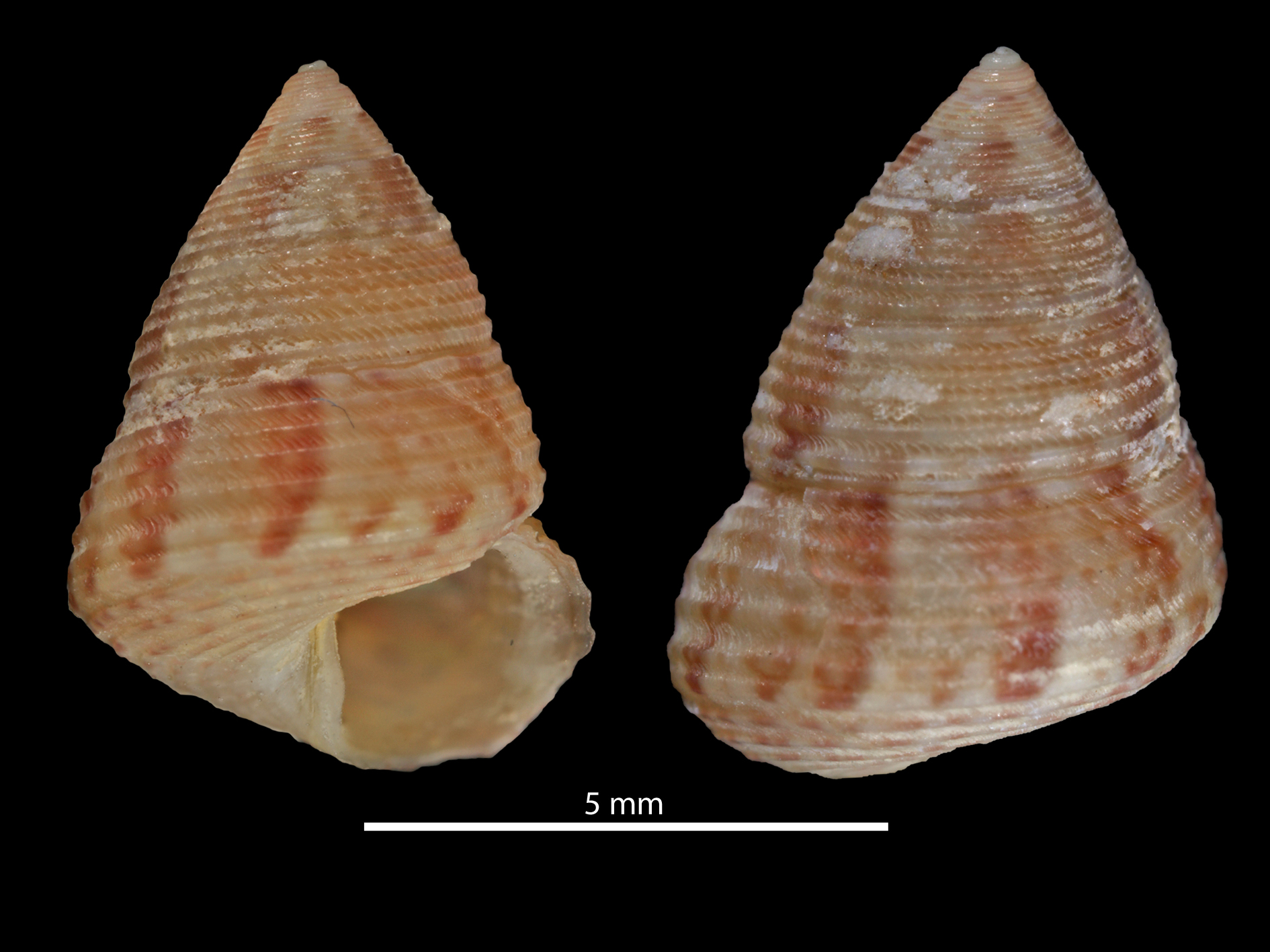
- Shell of Clelandella artilesi (paratype at MNHN, Paris)

Scientific classification
- Kingdom: Animalia
- Phylum: Mollusca
- Class: Gastropoda
- Subclass: Vetigastropoda
- Order: Trochida
- Superfamily: Trochoidea
- Family: Trochidae
- Genus: Clelandella
- Species: C. artilesi

Binomial name
- Clelandella artilesi Vilvens, Swinnen & Deniz, 2011

= Clelandella artilesi =

Species of gastropod

Clelandella artilesi is a species of sea snail, a marine gastropod mollusk in the family Trochidae, the top snails.

== Distribution ==
This species occurs in the Atlantic Ocean off the Western Sahara.
