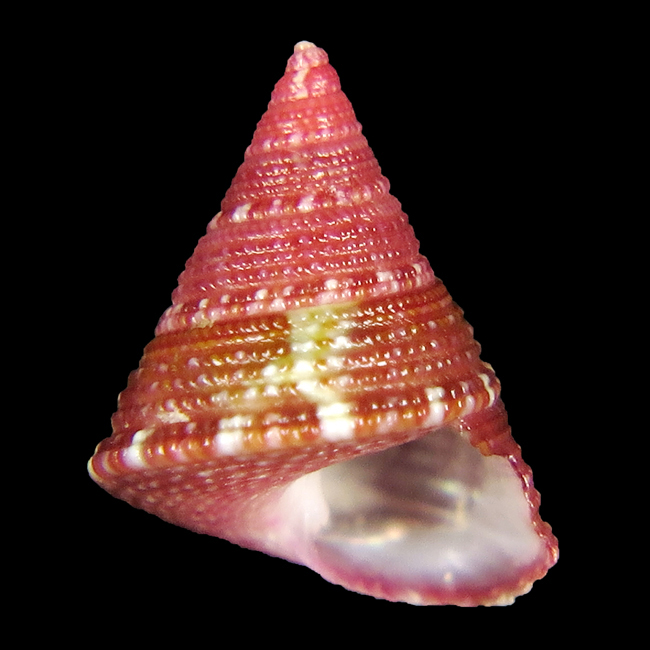

Scientific classification
- Kingdom: Animalia
- Phylum: Mollusca
- Class: Gastropoda
- Subclass: Vetigastropoda
- Order: Trochida
- Superfamily: Trochoidea
- Family: Trochidae
- Genus: Jujubinus
- Species: J. geographicus

Binomial name
- Jujubinus geographicus Poppe, Tagaro & Dekker, 2006

= Jujubinus geographicus =

Species of gastropod

Jujubinus geographicus is a species of sea snail, a marine gastropod mollusk in the family Trochidae, the top snails. It occurs off the Philippines.

The size of the shell varies between 4.5 mm and 5.7 mm.
