= Jujubinus vexans =

Scientific classification
- Kingdom: Animalia
- Phylum: Mollusca
- Class: Gastropoda
- Subclass: Vetigastropoda
- Order: Trochida
- Family: Trochidae
- Genus: Jujubinus
- Species: †J. vexans

Binomial name
- †Jujubinus vexans (Boettger, 1907)

Species of gastropod

Jujubinus vexans is a species of extinct sea snail, a marine gastropod mollusk in the family Trochidae, the top snails.
