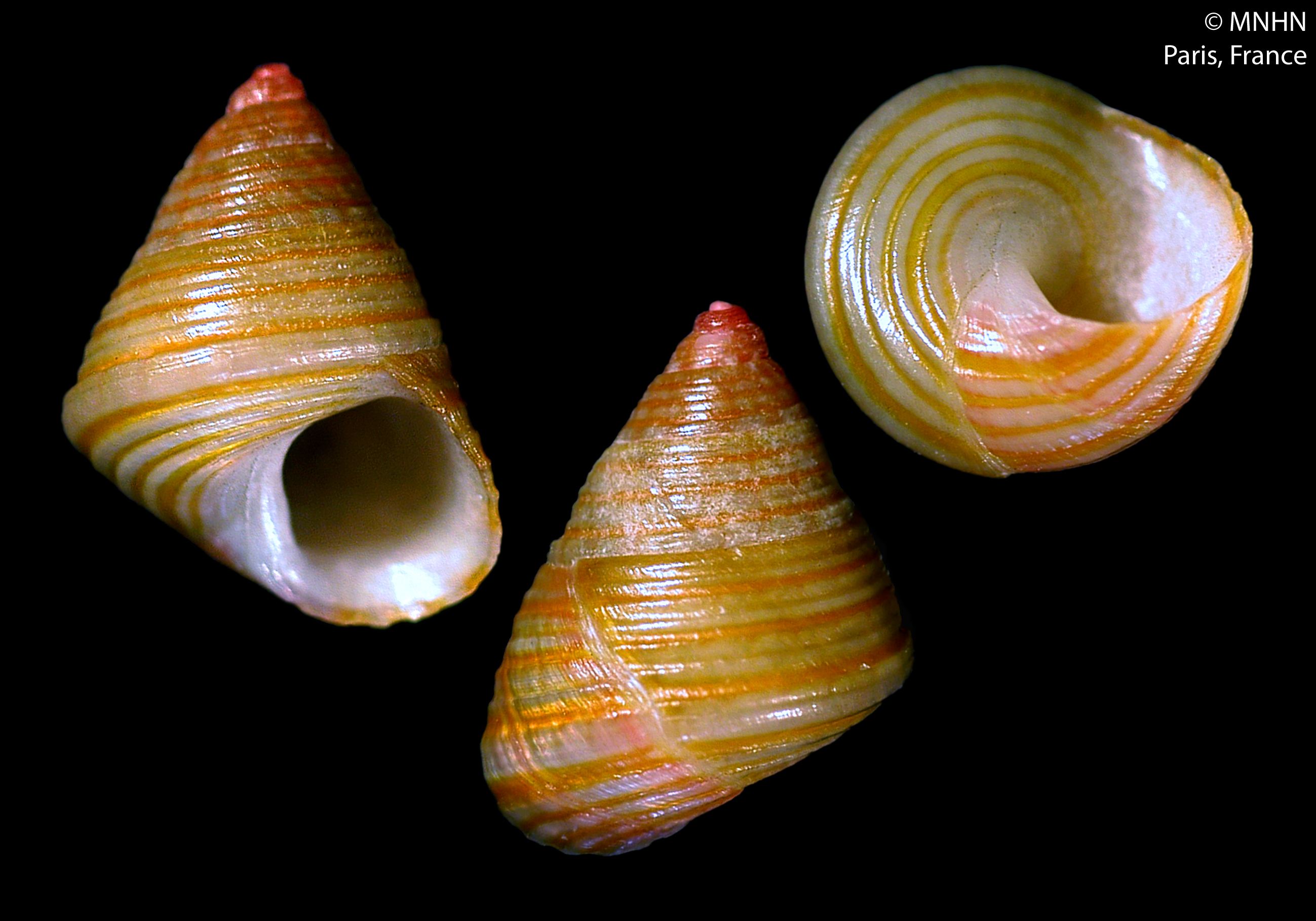

Scientific classification
- Kingdom: Animalia
- Phylum: Mollusca
- Class: Gastropoda
- Subclass: Vetigastropoda
- Order: Trochida
- Family: Trochidae
- Genus: Jujubinus
- Species: J. eleonorae

Binomial name
- Jujubinus eleonorae Smriglio, Di Giulio & Mariottini, 2014

= Jujubinus eleonorae =

Species of gastropod

Jujubinus eleonorae is a species of sea snail, a marine gastropod mollusk in the family Trochidae, the top snails.
