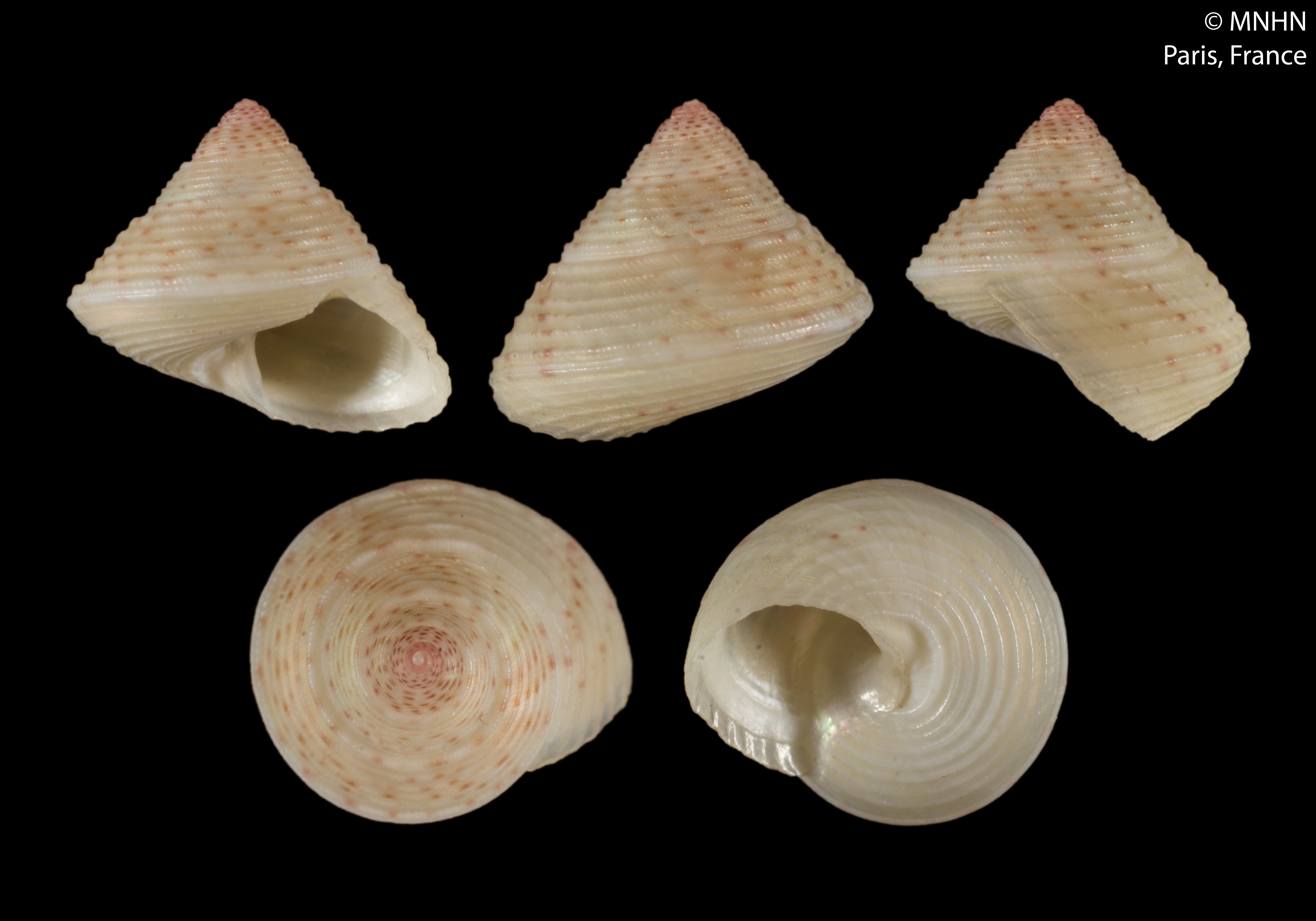
- Shell of Clelandella myriamae (holotype at MNHN, Paris)

Scientific classification
- Kingdom: Animalia
- Phylum: Mollusca
- Class: Gastropoda
- Subclass: Vetigastropoda
- Order: Trochida
- Superfamily: Trochoidea
- Family: Trochidae
- Genus: Clelandella
- Species: C. myriamae

Binomial name
- Clelandella myriamae Gofas, 2005

= Clelandella myriamae =

Species of gastropod

Clelandella myriamae is a species of sea snail, a marine gastropod mollusk in the family Trochidae, the top snails.

== Description ==
The size of the shell varies between 6.5 mm and 8 mm.

== Distribution ==
This species occurs in the eastern part of the Mediterranean Sea off Turkey.
