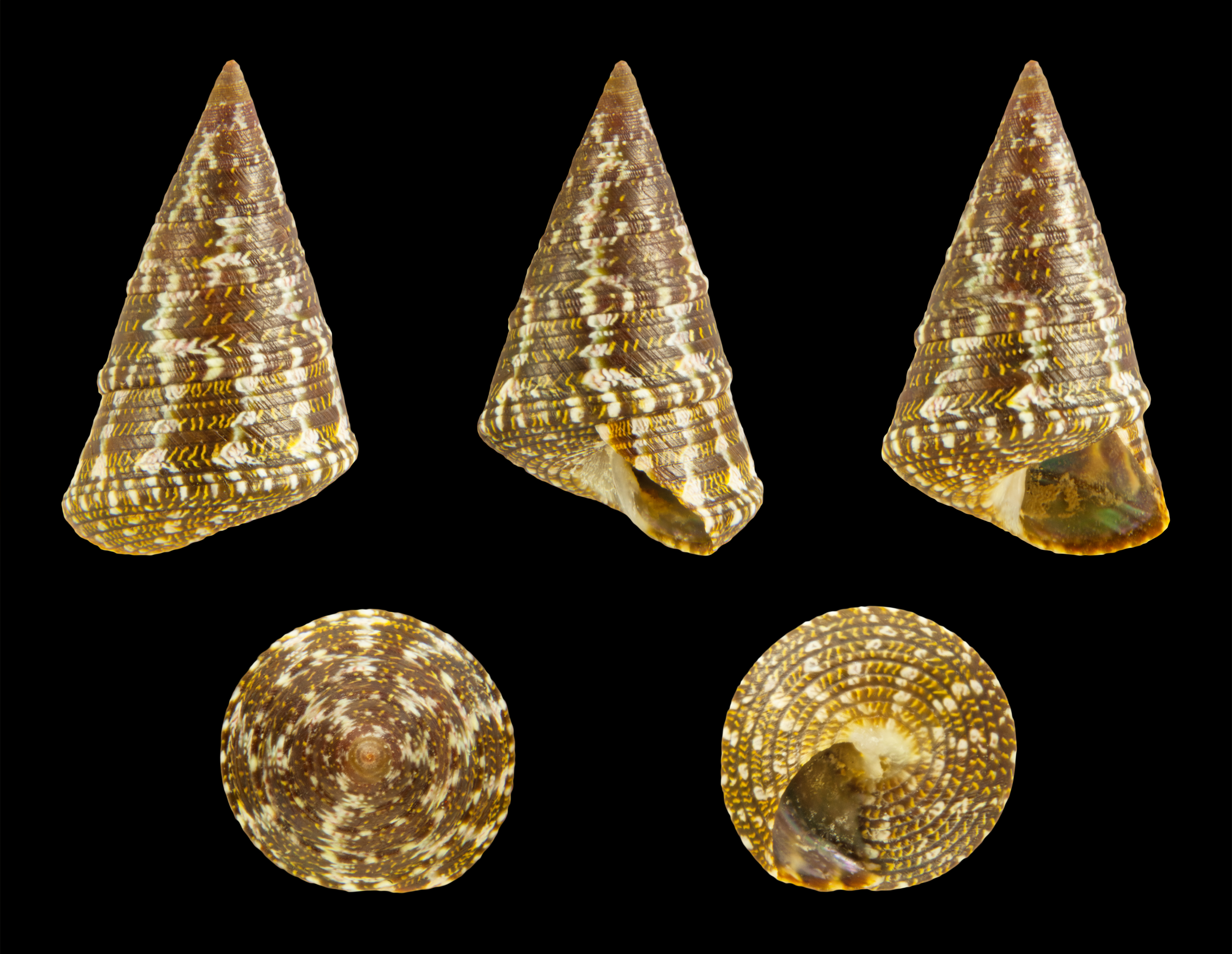
- A shell of Jujubinus polychroma

Scientific classification
- Kingdom: Animalia
- Phylum: Mollusca
- Class: Gastropoda
- Subclass: Vetigastropoda
- Order: Trochida
- Superfamily: Trochoidea
- Family: Trochidae
- Genus: Jujubinus
- Species: J. polychroma

Binomial name
- Jujubinus polychroma (A. Adams, 1851)

Synonyms
- Calliostoma polychroma Pilsbry, H.A. 1889; Calliostoma vexillum Pilsbry, H.A. 1889; Cantharidus (Cantharidus) gilberti (Montrouzier in Fischer, 1878); Cantharidus (Jujubinus) gilberti (Montrouzier in Fischer, 1878); Cantharidus (Thalotia) polychroma Schepman, M.M. 1908; Cantharidus gilberti (Montrouzier in Fischer, 1878); Cantharidus polychroma (A. Adams, 1853); Jujubinus gilberti (Montrouzier in Fischer, 1878); Jujubinus obscurus Thiele, J., 1930; Kanekotrochus gilberti Montrouzier, R.P. in Fischer, 1878; Trochus gilberti Montrouzier in Fischer, 1878; Ziziphinus polychroma A. Adams, 1851 (original combination); Ziziphinus polychromus sic

= Jujubinus polychromaa =

Species of gastropod

Jujubinus polychroma is a species of sea snail, a marine gastropod mollusk in the family Trochidae, the top snails.

== Description ==
The length of the shell varies between 12 mm and 18 mm. The perforate shell has a turreted-conic shape. It is, green, painted with undulating white bands, varied with buff angular lines. The plane whorls are subimbricating. They are ornamented with a slightly prominent articulated margin, subdistant impressed transverse lines, and longitudinally substriated. The body whorl is angulate The base of the shell is a little convex, sculptured with cinguli articulated with buff The aperture is subquadrate and green inside. The columella is straight subtruncate at its base.

== Distribution ==
This species occurs in the Indo-Pacific and off Australia.
