= Jujubinus rubioi =

Scientific classification
- Kingdom: Animalia
- Phylum: Mollusca
- Class: Gastropoda
- Subclass: Vetigastropoda
- Order: Trochida
- Superfamily: Trochoidea
- Family: Trochidae
- Genus: Jujubinus
- Species: J. rubioi

Binomial name
- Jujubinus rubioi Rolán & Templado, 2001

Species of gastropod

Jujubinus rubioi is a species of sea snail, a marine gastropod mollusk in the family Trochidae, the top snails. It occurs in the Atlantic Ocean off the Cape Verde Islands, and the height of the shell attains 6 mm.
