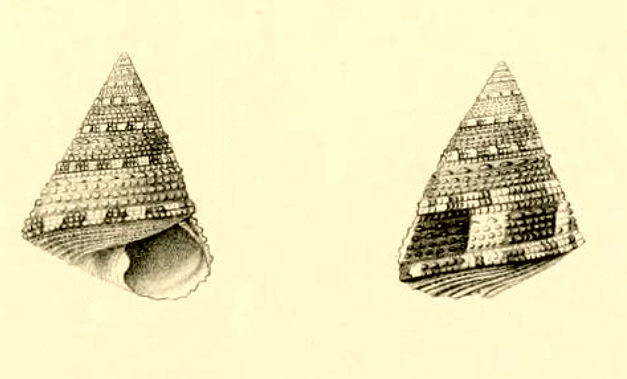
- Shell of Jujubinus maldivensis (holotype)

Scientific classification
- Kingdom: Animalia
- Phylum: Mollusca
- Class: Gastropoda
- Subclass: Vetigastropoda
- Order: Trochida
- Superfamily: Trochoidea
- Family: Trochidae
- Genus: Jujubinus
- Species: J. maldivensis

Binomial name
- Jujubinus maldivensis E.A. Smith, 1903

Synonyms
- Cantharidus (Thalotia) maldivensis Smith, 1903; Thalotia maldivensis E. A. Smith, 1903 (original combination)

= Jujubinus maldivensis =

Species of gastropod

Jujubinus maldivensis is a species of sea snail, a marine gastropod mollusk in the family Trochidae, the top snails.

== Description ==
Adult shells typically reach a height of 12.5 mm. This species exhibits significant variability. Some individuals closely resemble the typical form, while others, though typical in coloration, may display white flames on a purple background or a uniform green shade with yellow undertones, with or without the spotted band at the base of each whorl. Most specimens exhibit a color pattern interspersed with yellow granules and sometimes also with nearly black granules.

The sculpture is somewhat coarse. Under magnification, fine, elevated spiral striae (1 to 3 per interstice) can be observed between the rows of granules, crossed by oblique, slightly lamellose striae. On the base of the shell, one distinct lira and often one or two smaller intermediate lirae are visible, along with less crowded oblique striae.

== Distribution and taxonomy ==
This marine gastropod is native to the warm tropical waters of the Indo-Pacific region. Its primary documented range occurs across the shallow marine environments surrounding the Maldives, extending eastward through the Indo-Malaysia subregion and throughout the broader Central and East Indian Ocean. Within these marine habitats, the snails are typically associated with benthic substrates and local coral reefs where they graze upon microalgae.

From a taxonomic perspective, recent molecular and integrative systematic reviews of the subfamily Cantharidinae suggest that the genus Jujubinus may be restricted cladistically to a distinct radiation native to the northeastern Atlantic Ocean and the Mediterranean Sea. Consequently, the nine tropical Indo-West Pacific species traditionally attributed to this genus—including Jujubinus maldivensis—may eventually undergo further systematic reallocation to other regional cantharidine genera as comprehensive genetic mapping progresses.
