= Jujubinus quadrangulatus =

Scientific classification
- Kingdom: Animalia
- Phylum: Mollusca
- Class: Gastropoda
- Subclass: Vetigastropoda
- Order: Trochida
- Family: Trochidae
- Genus: Jujubinus
- Species: †J. quadrangulatus

Binomial name
- †Jujubinus quadrangulatus (Briart & Cornet, 1887)

Synonyms
- Jujubinus quadrangulus [sic] †; Turbo quadrangulatus Briart & Cornet, 1887 †

Species of gastropod

Jujubinus quadrangulatus is a species of extinct sea snail, a marine gastropod mollusk in the family Trochidae, which are the top snails.
