= Jujubinus rafaemesai =

Scientific classification
- Kingdom: Animalia
- Phylum: Mollusca
- Class: Gastropoda
- Subclass: Vetigastropoda
- Order: Trochida
- Superfamily: Trochoidea
- Family: Trochidae
- Genus: Jujubinus
- Species: J. rafaemesai

Binomial name
- Jujubinus rafaemesai Rolán & Swinnen, 2013

Species of gastropod

Jujubinus rafaemesai is a species of sea snail, a marine gastropod mollusk in the family Trochidae, the top snails. It occurs in the Atlantic Ocean off the Canary Islands.
