= Jujubinus karpathoensis =

Scientific classification
- Kingdom: Animalia
- Phylum: Mollusca
- Class: Gastropoda
- Subclass: Vetigastropoda
- Order: Trochida
- Superfamily: Trochoidea
- Family: Trochidae
- Genus: Jujubinus
- Species: J. karpathoensis

Binomial name
- Jujubinus karpathoensis Nordsieck, 1973

Synonyms
- Jujubinus aegeensis Nordsieck 1973

Species of gastropod

Jujubinus karpathoensis is a species of sea snail, a marine gastropod mollusk in the family Trochidae, the top snails. Like all other trochids, these snails have coiled shells in the adult stage. It occurs in the Eastern Mediterranean Sea, and the height of the shell attains 6 mm.
