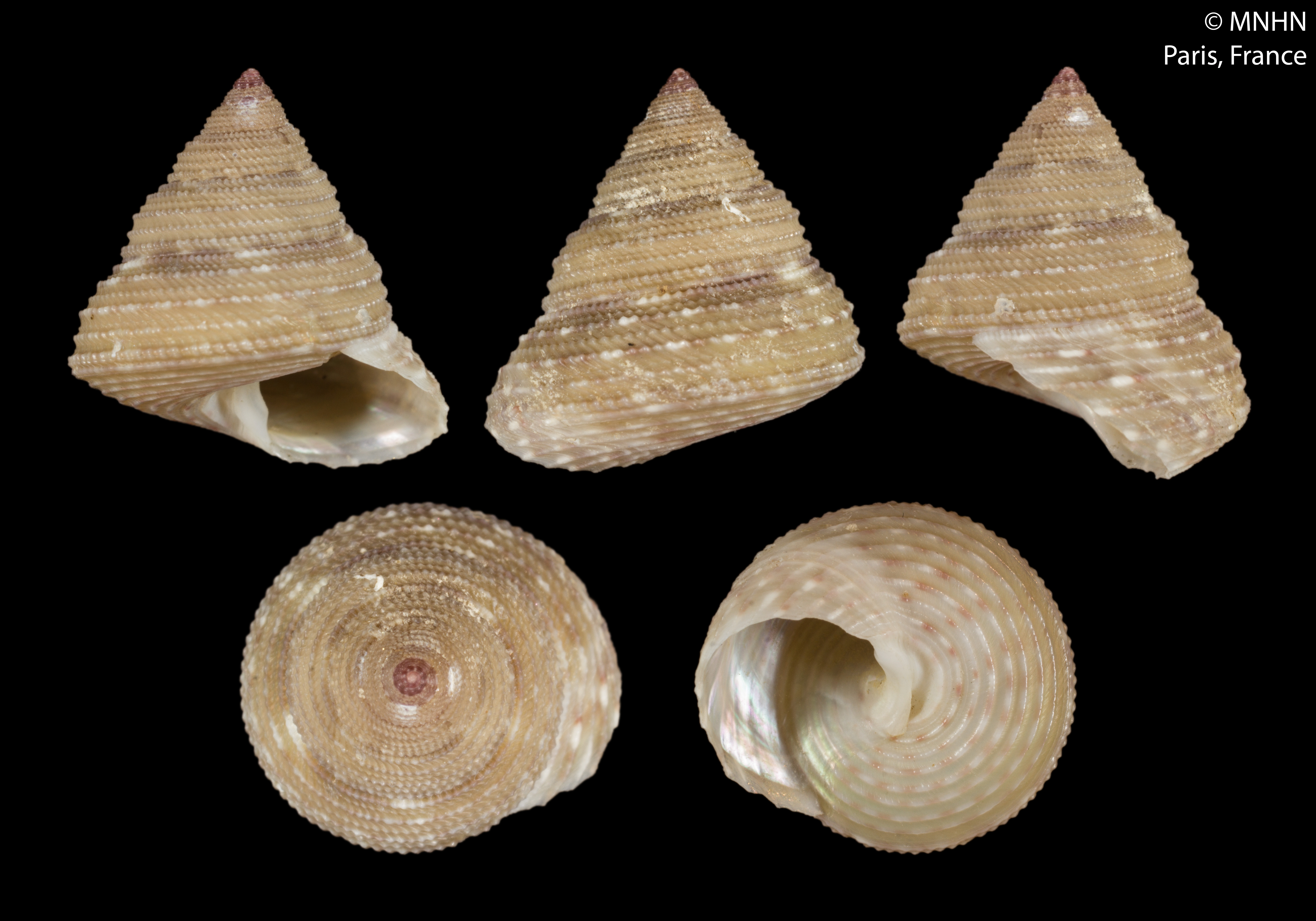
- Shell of Clelandella azorica (holotype at MNHN, Paris)

Scientific classification
- Kingdom: Animalia
- Phylum: Mollusca
- Class: Gastropoda
- Subclass: Vetigastropoda
- Order: Trochida
- Superfamily: Trochoidea
- Family: Trochidae
- Genus: Clelandella
- Species: C. azorica

Binomial name
- Clelandella azorica Gofas, 2005

= Clelandella azorica =

Species of gastropod

Clelandella azorica is a species of sea snail, a marine gastropod mollusk in the family Trochidae, the top snails.

== Description ==
The size of the shell ranges between 9 mm and 12.5 mm. The shell colour varies between a whitish to yellowish background and brownish flames or blotches, to small brownish spots tending to form an articulated pattern along its cords.

== Distribution ==
This species occurs in the Atlantic Ocean throughout the Azores archipelago, living in depths between 190-465 metres.
