= Jujubinus interruptus =

Scientific classification
- Kingdom: Animalia
- Phylum: Mollusca
- Class: Gastropoda
- Subclass: Vetigastropoda
- Order: Trochida
- Superfamily: Trochoidea
- Family: Trochidae
- Genus: Jujubinus
- Species: J. interruptus

Binomial name
- Jujubinus interruptus (Wood, 1828)

Synonyms
- Cantharidus (Jujubinus) interruptus (Wood, 1828); Calliostoma plambralum Spry, 1961

Species of gastropod

Jujubinus interruptus is a species of sea snail, a marine gastropod mollusk in the family Trochidae, the top snails. It occurs in Tanzania.
