= Jujubinus fraterculus =

Scientific classification
- Kingdom: Animalia
- Phylum: Mollusca
- Class: Gastropoda
- Subclass: Vetigastropoda
- Order: Trochida
- Family: Trochidae
- Genus: Jujubinus
- Species: J. fraterculus

Binomial name
- Jujubinus fraterculus (Monterosato, 1880)

Species of gastropod

Jujubinus fraterculus is a species of sea snail, a marine gastropod mollusk in the family Trochidae, the top snails.
