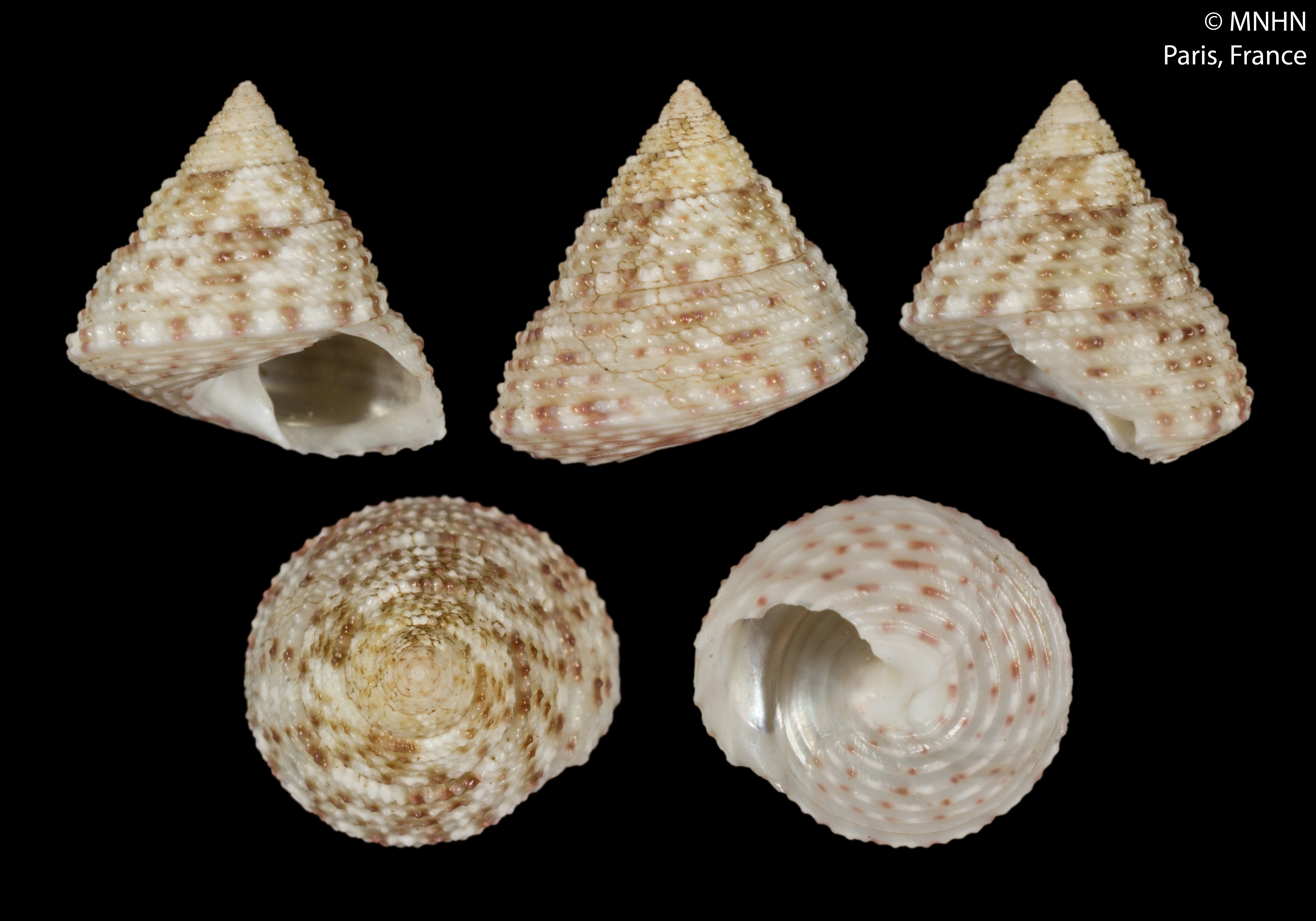
- Shell of Clelandella dautzenbergi (holotype at MNHN, Paris)

Scientific classification
- Kingdom: Animalia
- Phylum: Mollusca
- Class: Gastropoda
- Subclass: Vetigastropoda
- Order: Trochida
- Superfamily: Trochoidea
- Family: Trochidae
- Genus: Clelandella
- Species: C. dautzenbergi

Binomial name
- Clelandella dautzenbergi Gofas, 2005

Synonyms
- Calliostoma miliare var. candida Dautzenberg 1927

= Clelandella dautzenbergi =

Species of gastropod

Clelandella dautzenbergi is a species of sea snail, a marine gastropod mollusk in the family Trochidae, the top snails.

== Description ==
The size of the shell varies between 9 mm and 15 mm, with a tiny protoconch of less than one whorl and a teleoconch up to 7-8 whorls. The sculpture on the spire whorls consists of beaded spiral cords as wide as interspaces; one cord running just above the suture and continued on the peripheral angle of the body whorl is a duplicate with adapical component strongly beaded and abapical one less so. The abapical surface is imperforate, slightly convex and bearing 6-10 spiral cords, as wide as interspaces and not beaded. The shell colour varies from whitish to yellowish, with nacre showing through in some cases, broad brown flames starting from the suture on the early spire whorls; later whorls usually contain cords and a peripheral rim white articulated by white and brown streaks. The abapical cords also articulated by smaller white and brown flecks.

== Distribution ==
This species occurs in the Mediterranean Sea and in the Atlantic Ocean off West Africa, Norway and Iceland.
