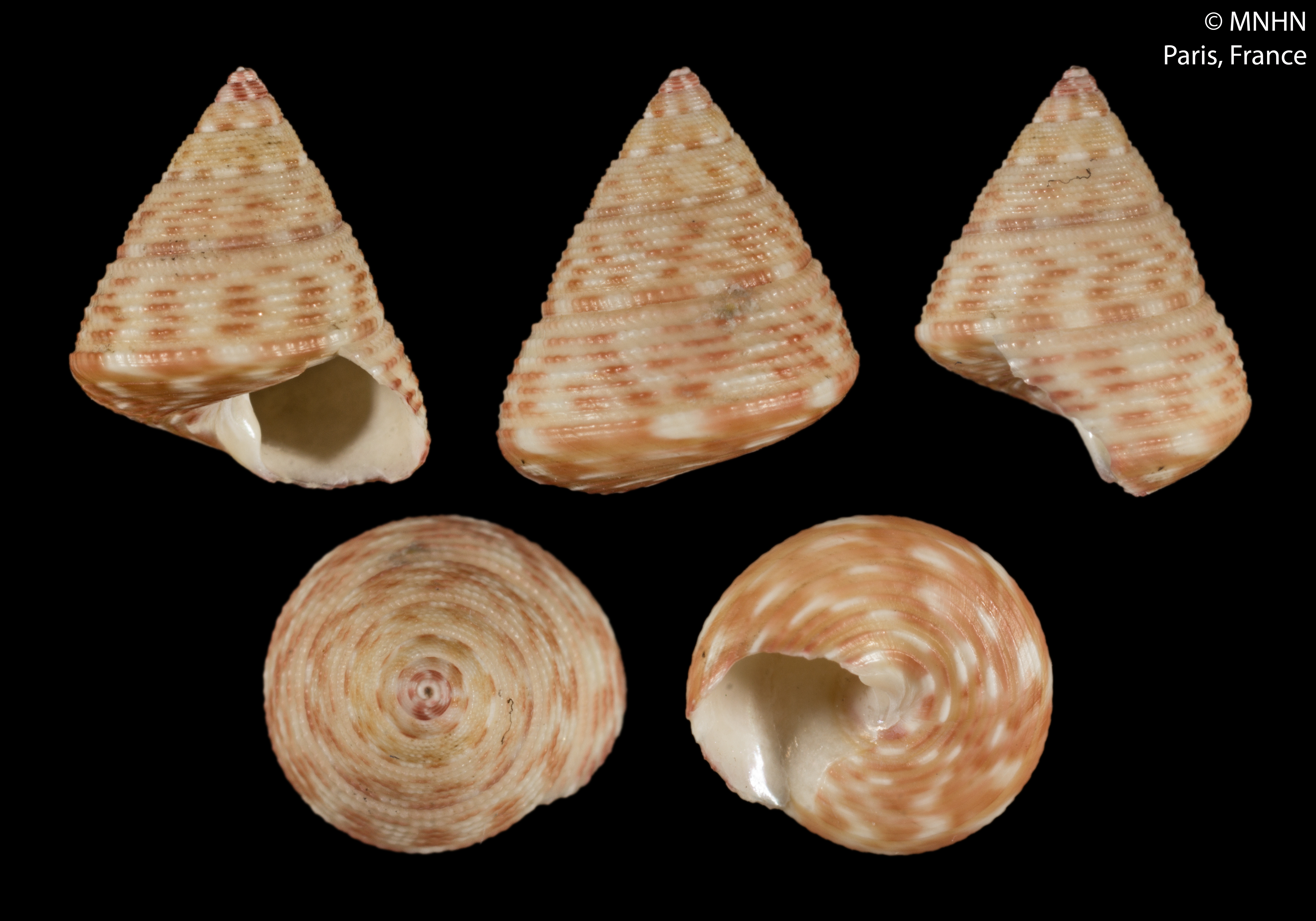
- Shell of Clelandella madeirensis (hootype at MNHN, Paris)

Scientific classification
- Kingdom: Animalia
- Phylum: Mollusca
- Class: Gastropoda
- Subclass: Vetigastropoda
- Order: Trochida
- Superfamily: Trochoidea
- Family: Trochidae
- Genus: Clelandella
- Species: C. madeirensis

Binomial name
- Clelandella madeirensis Gofas, 2005

= Clelandella madeirensis =

Species of gastropod

Clelandella madeirensis is a species of sea snail, a marine gastropod mollusk in the family Trochidae, the top snails.

== Description ==
The height of the shell attains 8 mm.

== Distribution ==
This species occurs in the Atlantic Ocean off Madeira.
