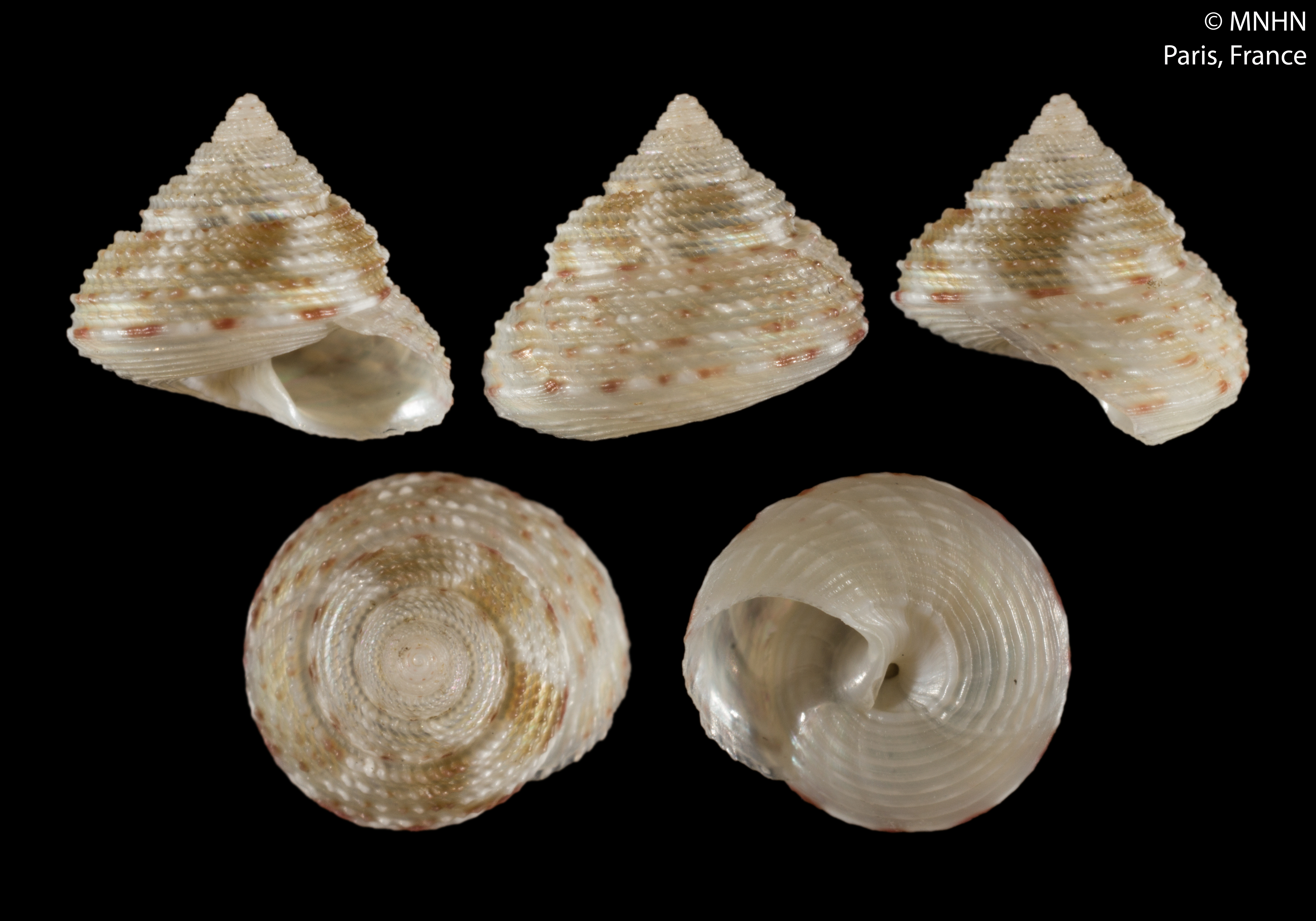
- Shell of Clelandella perforata (holotype at MNHN, Paris)

Scientific classification
- Kingdom: Animalia
- Phylum: Mollusca
- Class: Gastropoda
- Subclass: Vetigastropoda
- Order: Trochida
- Superfamily: Trochoidea
- Family: Trochidae
- Genus: Clelandella
- Species: C. perforata

Binomial name
- Clelandella perforata Gofas, 2005

= Clelandella perforata =

Species of gastropod

Clelandella perforata is a species of sea snail, a marine gastropod mollusk in the family Trochidae, the top snails.

== Description ==
The height of the shell varies between 6 mm and 9 mm, with a tiny protoconch of less than one whorl and a teleoconch up to 5-6 whorls. The sculpture consists of beaded spiral cords as wide as the interspaces, one of which is concealed by the suture and continued on peripheral angle of the body whorl. The profile of first teleoconch whorl is convex, of the later whorls less so but swollen subsuturally, with a suture somewhat canaliculated. The abapical surface is slightly convex, bearing 6-10 spiral cords, as wide as the interspaces, crossed by growth lines but not beaded. The axis has a distinct umbilicus, bordered by the columellar edge. The shell colour is whitish with nacre generally showing through, some specimens without pattern, others with broad brown or reddish flames starting from the suture and with a peripheral rim white articulated by brown streaks. The others show adapical cords and a peripheral rim articulated. The abapical cords are generally colourless, sometimes articulated.

== Distribution ==
This species occurs in the Northeast Atlantic at the Great Meteor Bank.
