= Jujubinus pigeonblancensis =

Scientific classification
- Kingdom: Animalia
- Phylum: Mollusca
- Class: Gastropoda
- Subclass: Vetigastropoda
- Order: Trochida
- Family: Trochidae
- Genus: Jujubinus
- Species: †J. pigeonblancensis

Binomial name
- †Jujubinus pigeonblancensis Ceulemans, Van Dingenen & Landau, 2016

Species of gastropod

Jujubinus pigeonblancensis is a species of extinct sea snail, a marine gastropod mollusk in the family Trochidae, the top snails.
