= Jujubinus ajachaensis =

Scientific classification
- Kingdom: Animalia
- Phylum: Mollusca
- Class: Gastropoda
- Subclass: Vetigastropoda
- Order: Trochida
- Family: Trochidae
- Genus: Jujubinus
- Species: †J. ajachaensis

Binomial name
- †Jujubinus ajachaensis Martín-González & Vera-Peláez, 2018

Species of gastropod

Jujubinus ajachaensis is a species of extinct sea snail, a marine gastropod mollusk in the family Trochidae, the top snails.

Fossils were found in Late Miocene strata of the Canary Islands (Spain).
