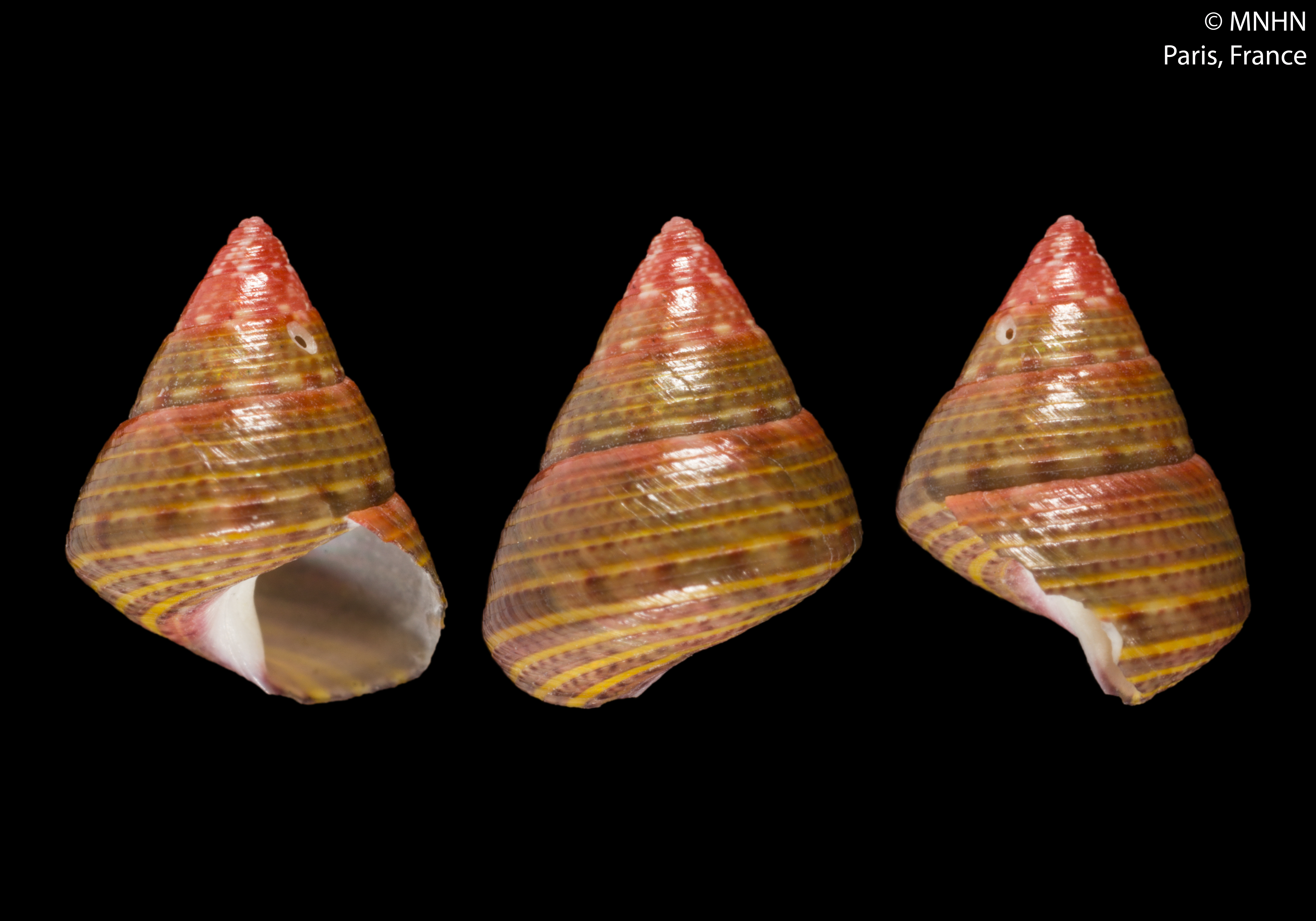
- The holotype from the Alboran Sea

Scientific classification
- Kingdom: Animalia
- Phylum: Mollusca
- Class: Gastropoda
- Subclass: Vetigastropoda
- Order: Trochida
- Family: Trochidae
- Genus: Jujubinus
- Species: J. alboranensis

Binomial name
- Jujubinus alboranensis Smriglio, Mariottini & Oliverio, 2015

= Jujubinus alboranensis =

Species of gastropod

Jujubinus alboranensis is a species of sea snail, a marine gastropod mollusk in the family Trochidae, which are the top snails.

== Description ==
The shell of Jujubinus alboranensis is small and slightly turriculate. It has sculptures of incised spiral lines. Proscoline lamellae is absent between the cords.

== Distribution ==
It is found in the Alborán Sea which is located in the western Mediterranean Sea.

== Etymology ==
It is named after the Alborán Sea, where it was first discovered.

== See also ==
- Jujubinus
