= Jujubinus curinii =

Scientific classification
- Kingdom: Animalia
- Phylum: Mollusca
- Class: Gastropoda
- Subclass: Vetigastropoda
- Order: Trochida
- Superfamily: Trochoidea
- Family: Trochidae
- Genus: Jujubinus
- Species: J. curinii

Binomial name
- Jujubinus curinii Bogi & Campani, 2005

Species of gastropod

Jujubinus curinii is a species of sea snail, a marine gastropod mollusk in the family Trochidae, the top snails.

This species occurs in the Mediterranean Sea off Sicily.
