= Jujubinus tumidulus =

Scientific classification
- Kingdom: Animalia
- Phylum: Mollusca
- Class: Gastropoda
- Subclass: Vetigastropoda
- Order: Trochida
- Superfamily: Trochoidea
- Family: Trochidae
- Genus: Jujubinus
- Species: J. tumidulus

Binomial name
- Jujubinus tumidulus (Aradas, 1846)

Synonyms
- Trochus tumidulus Aradas, 1846

Species of gastropod

Jujubinus tumidulus is a species of sea snail, a marine gastropod mollusk in the family Trochidae, the top snails. It occurs in the Mediterranean Sea, and the size of the shell varies between 2 mm and 6 mm.
