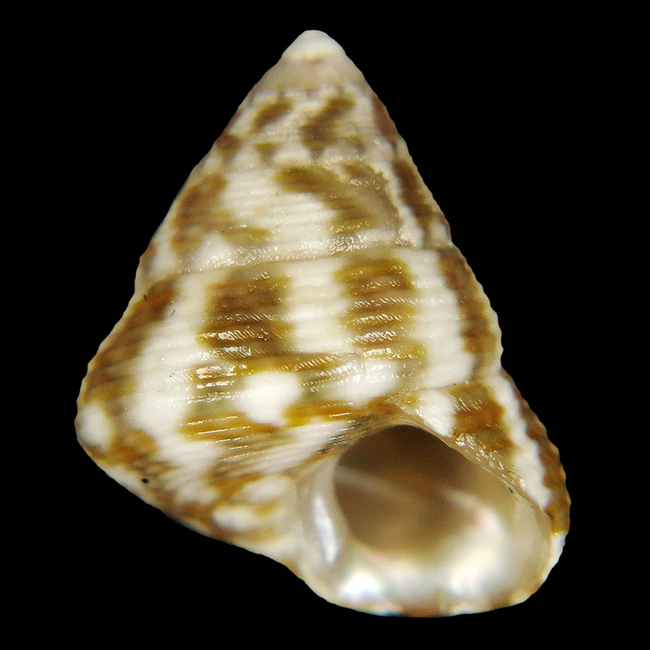

Scientific classification
- Kingdom: Animalia
- Phylum: Mollusca
- Class: Gastropoda
- Subclass: Vetigastropoda
- Order: Trochida
- Superfamily: Trochoidea
- Family: Trochidae
- Genus: Jujubinus
- Species: J. escondidus

Binomial name
- Jujubinus escondidus Poppe, Tagaro & Dekker, 2006

= Jujubinus escondidus =

Species of gastropod

Jujubinus escondidus is a species of sea snail, a marine gastropod mollusk in the family Trochidae, the top snails. It occurs off the Philippines.

This species' shell size varies between 4 mm and 8.2 mm.
