= Jujubinus vexationis =

Scientific classification
- Kingdom: Animalia
- Phylum: Mollusca
- Class: Gastropoda
- Subclass: Vetigastropoda
- Order: Trochida
- Superfamily: Trochoidea
- Family: Trochidae
- Genus: Jujubinus
- Species: J. vexationis

Binomial name
- Jujubinus vexationis Curini-Galletti, 1990

Species of gastropod

Jujubinus vexationis is a species of sea snail, a marine gastropod mollusk in the family Trochidae, the top snails. It occurs in the Atlantic Ocean off Madeira, and the size of the shell varies between 5 mm and 8 mm.
