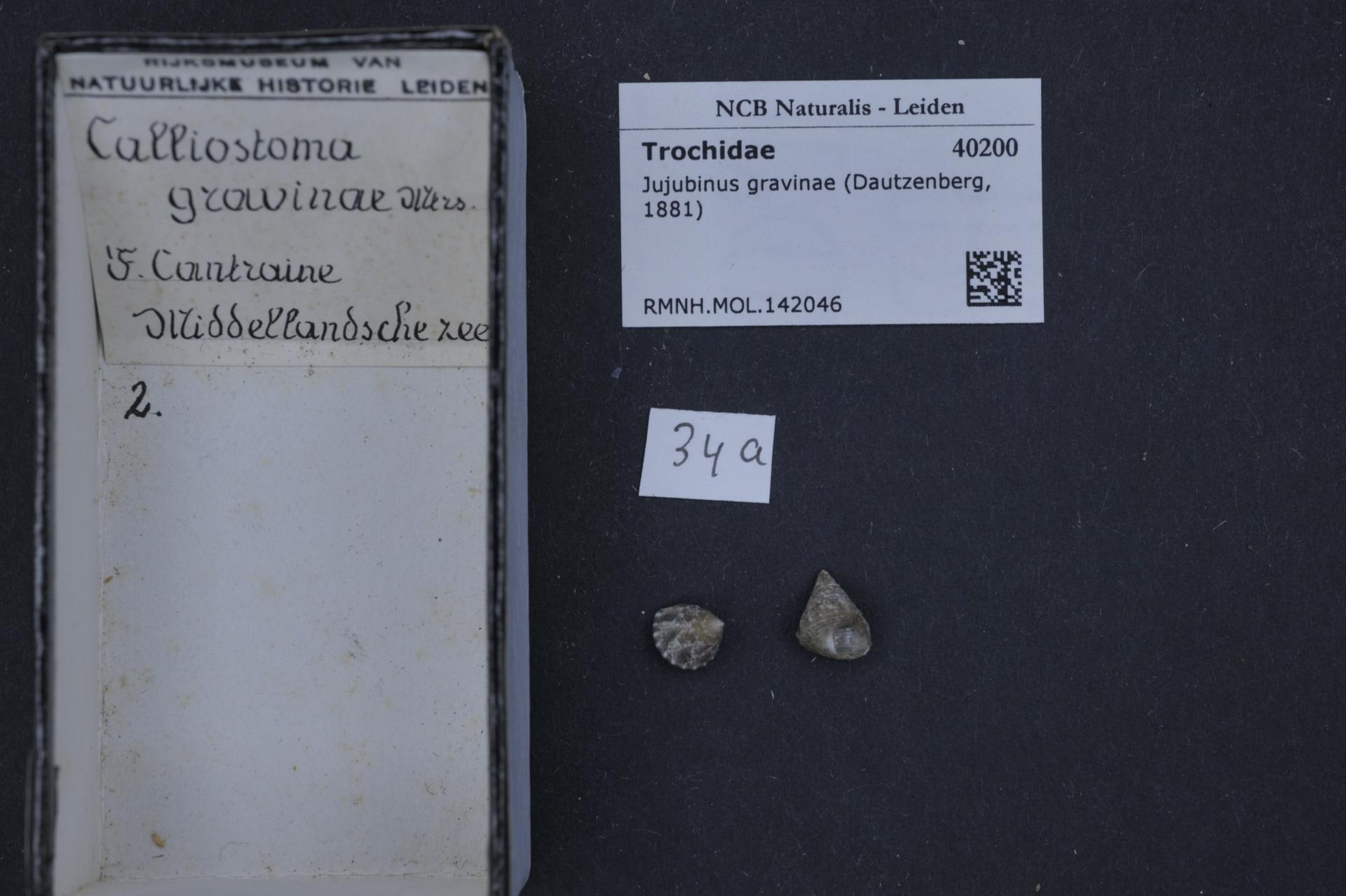
- Jujubinus gravinae (Dautzenberg, 1881)

Scientific classification
- Kingdom: Animalia
- Phylum: Mollusca
- Class: Gastropoda
- Subclass: Vetigastropoda
- Order: Trochida
- Superfamily: Trochoidea
- Family: Trochidae
- Genus: Jujubinus
- Species: J. gravinae

Binomial name
- Jujubinus gravinae (Dautzenberg, 1881)

Synonyms
- Jujubinus parvosiculus Ghisotti & Melone, 1975; Trochus gravinae Dautzenberg, 1881 (original description)

= Jujubinus gravinae =

Species of gastropod

Jujubinus gravinae is a species of sea snail, a marine gastropod mollusk in the family Trochidae, the top snails. It is both a deposit feeder and grazer, feeding on organic matter particles in sediment and low-growing organisms.

== Description ==
The size of the shell varies between 3 mm and 8 mm. The animal itself has a 4mm long dextrally coiled body. Its wet body mass is 0.0484 g and its body volume is 0.0277 cm^3. It utilizes mucus-mediated gliding, the process moving forward by alternating regions of muscular contraction and expansion over a layer of mucus.

== Distribution ==
This species occurs in the Western Mediterranean Sea and in the Atlantic Ocean off Portugal, the Canary Islands and the Cape Verdes.
