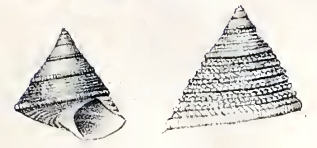
- Drawing with two views of a shell of Clelandella miliaris

Scientific classification
- Kingdom: Animalia
- Phylum: Mollusca
- Class: Gastropoda
- Subclass: Vetigastropoda
- Order: Trochida
- Superfamily: Trochoidea
- Family: Trochidae
- Genus: Clelandella
- Species: C. miliaris

Binomial name
- Clelandella miliaris (Brocchi, 1814)

Synonyms
- Calliostoma miliaris (Brocchi, 1814); Clelandella clelandi (W. Wood, 1828); Conulus millegranus Philippi; Jujubinus aureus Monterosato, 1890; Jujubinus clelandi (Wood, 1828); Jujubinus miliaris (Brocchi, 1814); Trochus clelandi W. Wood, 1828; Trochus clelandianis Leach; Trochus elegans Jeffreys; Trochus martini Smith, J., 1839; Trochus miliaris Brocchi, 1814 (original description); Trochus millegranus Philippi, 1836; Trochus millegranus var. pyramidata Jeffreys 1865; Ziziphinus millegranus Philippi

= Clelandella miliaris =

Species of gastropod

Clelandella miliaris is a species of sea snail, a marine gastropod mollusk in the family Trochidae, the top snails.

== Description ==
The size of the shell varies between 7 mm and 18 mm. The imperforate, rather thin, but pretty solid shell has a strictly conical shape. It is whitish or yellowish, with more or less obvious longitudinal flames, often reduced to a few spots on the ribs and a row of spots at the periphery of each whorl. The surface is densely finely sculptured by spiral lirae crossed by very regular oblique lamellae, producing a clathrate pattern. The spiral lirae number about 6 on each whorl, but often double as many, by the intercalation of riblets in the interstices. The periphery has a prominent keel, cord-like, with secondary spiral striae, or bifid, cut into compressed granules, somewhat prominent above the sutures. The base has about 8 concentric ribs. The interstices are radiately striate, sometimes with a central riblet. The spire has a conical shape with about 7 whorls. The periphery is acutely angled. The base of the shell is flat. The aperture is quadrangular. The short columella is nearly straight.

== Distribution ==
This marine species has a wide distribution. It occurs off Lofoten Islands, the North Sea (Norway to Gibraltar), off Cape Verde Islands, West Sahara and Mauritania; in the Mediterranean Sea and the Adriatic Sea. In the Baltic Sea it has become a vulnerable species.
