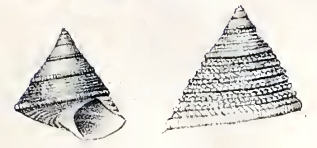
- Clelandella miliaris

Scientific classification
- Kingdom: Animalia
- Phylum: Mollusca
- Class: Gastropoda
- Subclass: Vetigastropoda
- Order: Trochida
- Superfamily: Trochoidea
- Family: Trochidae
- Genus: Clelandella; Winkworth, 1932

Type species
- Clelandella clelandi W. Wood, 1828

Synonyms
- Jujubinus (Clelandella) Monterosato, 1884

= Clelandella =

Genus of gastropods

Clelandella is a genus of sea snails, marine gastropod mollusks in the family Trochidae, the top snails.

== Species ==
Species within the genus Clelandella include:

- Clelandella artilesi Vilvens, Swinnen & Deniz, 2011
- Clelandella azorica Gofas, 2005
- Clelandella dautzenbergi Gofas, 2005
- Clelandella madeirensis Gofas, 2005
- Clelandella miliaris (Brocchi, 1814)
- Clelandella myriamae Gofas, 2005
- Clelandella perforata Gofas, 2005

Species brought into synonymy

- Clelandella clelandi (W. Wood, 1828): synonym of Clelandella miliaris (Brocchi, 1814)
- Clelandella infuscata (Gould, 1861): synonym of Kanekotrochus infuscatus (Gould, 1861)
