= Jujubinus guanchus =

Scientific classification
- Kingdom: Animalia
- Phylum: Mollusca
- Class: Gastropoda
- Subclass: Vetigastropoda
- Order: Trochida
- Superfamily: Trochoidea
- Family: Trochidae
- Genus: Jujubinus
- Species: J. guanchus

Binomial name
- Jujubinus guanchus Curini-Galletti, 1985

Species of gastropod

Jujubinus guanchus is a species of sea snail, a marine gastropod mollusk in the family Trochidae, the top snails. It in the Atlantic Ocean off the Canary Islands and is named after the Guanche people who once inhabited the Canary Islands.

The height of the shell attains 5 mm.
