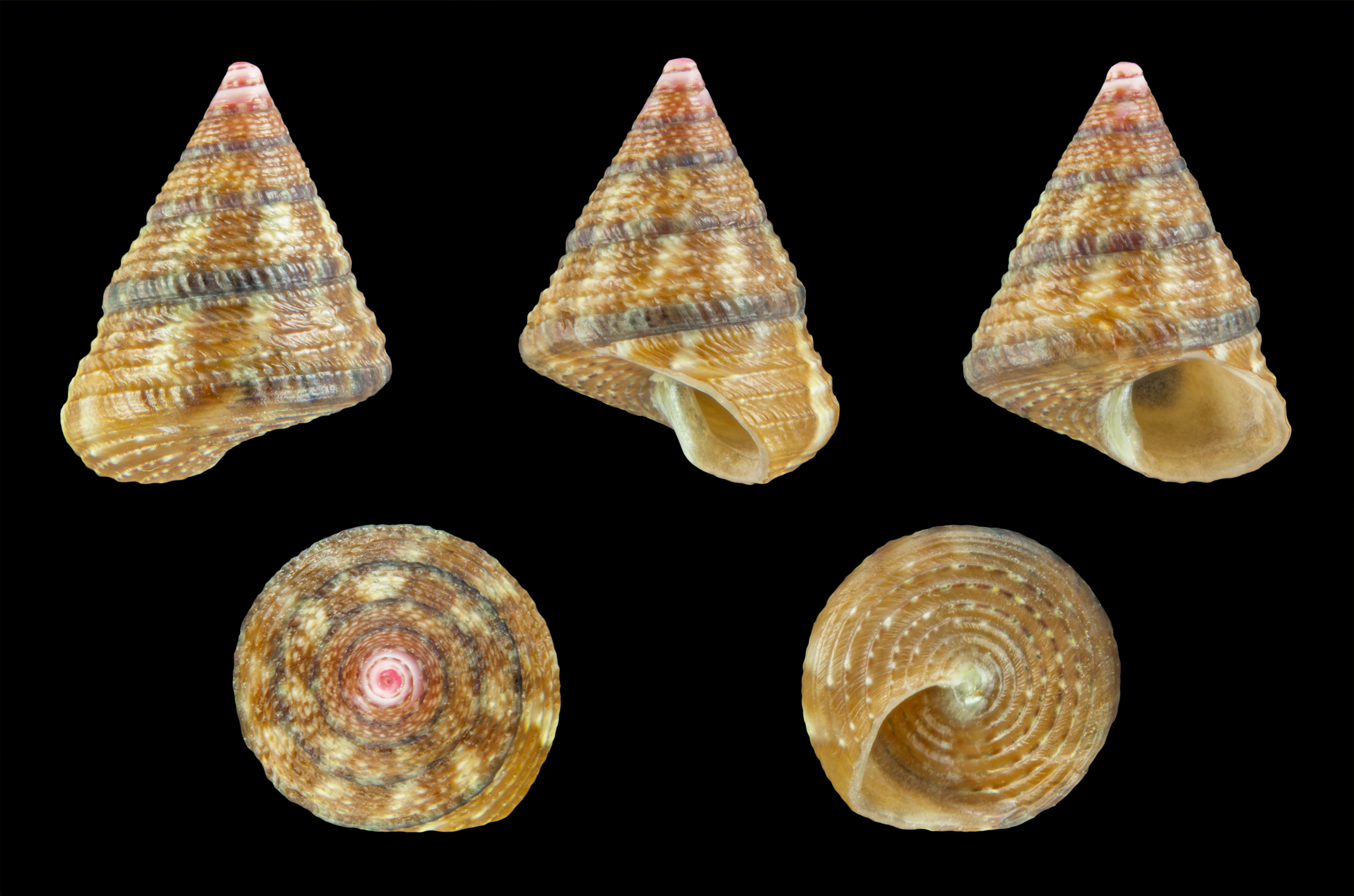
- Jujubinus exasperatus

Scientific classification
- Kingdom: Animalia
- Phylum: Mollusca
- Class: Gastropoda
- Subclass: Vetigastropoda
- Order: Trochida
- Superfamily: Trochoidea
- Family: Trochidae
- Genus: Jujubinus
- Species: J. exasperatus

Binomial name
- Jujubinus exasperatus (Pennant, 1777)

Synonyms
- Calliostoma (Jujubinus) exasperatum (Pennant, 1777); Calliostoma (Jujubinus) exasperatum var. lutea Pallary, 1900; Jujubinus corallinus Monterosato, 1884 (dubious synonym); Jujubinus igneus Sturany, 1896; Jujubinus istrianus Coen, 1933; Jujubinus mixtus Ghisotti & Melone, 1975; Jujubinus striatus var. monterosatoi Bucquoy, Dautzenberg & Dollfus, 1884; Trochus bicolor Risso, 1826 (dubious synonym); Trochus crenulatus Brocchi, 1814 (dubious synonym); Trochus dejacobi Aradas & Benoit, 1841; Trochus dumerili Risso, 1826; Trochus elegans de Blainville, 1830; Trochus erythroleucos Gmelin, 1791; Trochus exasperatus Pennant, 1777; Trochus exasperatus var. excavata Monterosato, 1880; Trochus exasperatus var. flammulata Monterosato, 1880 (dubious syn.); Trochus exiguus Pulteney, 1799; Trochus matoni Payraudeau, 1826; Trochus pyramidatus Lamarck, 1822; Trochus reinierius Risso, 1826; Trochus socius Fischer P., 1895 (dubious synonym); Trochus tricolor Risso, 1826; Trochus vulgaris Risso, 1826

= Jujubinus exasperatus =

Species of gastropod

Jujubinus exasperatus, the Rough Top Shell, is a species of sea snail, a marine gastropod mollusk in the family Trochidae, the top snails.

== Description ==
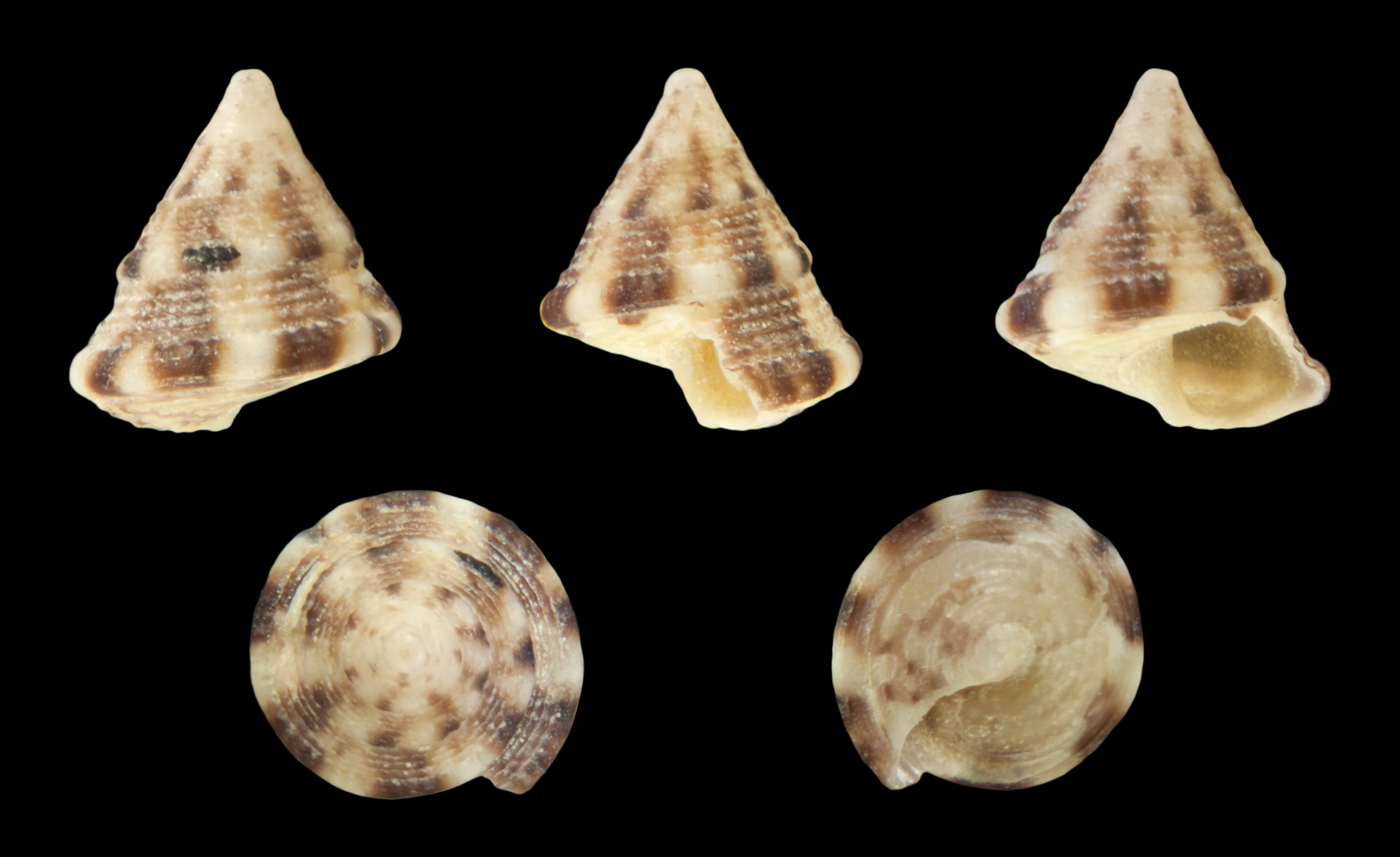
f. monterosatoi

Jujubinus exasperatus has a shell which can reach an adult size of 7–15 millimetres (0.28–0.59 in). The shape of this shell is conical, with straight sides and a flat imperforate base with ca. 6 spiral cords which are smoother than on the whorls. The sides show four-five beaded cords. These are narrower than the interspaces in which there are very fine, prosocline lamellae. A considerably thicker compound cord is seen above the suture on the spire and at the periphery of body whorl. The aperture is subquadrangular, with a moderate denticle at the base of the columella. The outer lip has a cutting edge. The background color of the first whorls is typically reddish, the later whorls usually whitish with red, brown or (more rarely) black flames. The peripheral cord is usually articulated with red and white. The apex is pink. Interior of aperture is nacreous. This sea snail is herbivorous, feeding on algae.

== Distribution ==
This species occurs in Eastern Atlantic, from the British islands to Portugal and Morocco and in the Mediterranean Sea, mainly in Spain, Italy, Greece. It is common in the seagrass prairies of Posidonia oceanica, at depths of 0 to 30 m.
