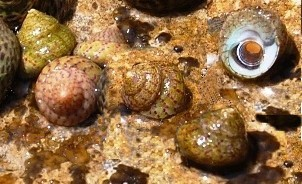
- Five live individuals of Gibbula divaricata from the Mediterranean Sea

Scientific classification
- Kingdom: Animalia
- Phylum: Mollusca
- Class: Gastropoda
- Subclass: Vetigastropoda
- Order: Trochida
- Superfamily: Trochoidea
- Family: Trochidae
- Genus: Gibbula; Risso, 1826

Type species
- Trochus magus Linnaeus, C., 1758

Synonyms
- Colliculus Monterosato, 1888; Forskalena Iredale, 1918; Forskalia H. Adams & A. Adams, 1854 (preoccupied by Forskalia Kölliker, 1853 (Hydrozoa)); Gibbula (Magulus) Monterosato, 1888; † Gibbula (Moniliopsidea) Tomlin, 1930; † Gibbula (Moniliopsis) Cossmann, 1918 (invalid: junior homonym of Moniliopsis Conrad, 1865; Amonilea and Moniliopsidea are replacement names); † Gibbula (Pseudodiloma) Cossmann, 1888 · accepted, alternate representation; Moniliopsidea Tomlin, 1930 (junior objective synonym of Amonilea Cossmann, 1920); Trochus (Gibbula)

= Gibbula =

Gibbula Temporal range: Late Cretaceous–Recent

Genus of gastropods

Gibbula is a genus of small sea snails, marine gastropod molluscs in the subfamily Cantharidinae of the family Trochidae, the top snails.

== Taxonomy ==
Affenzeller et al. (2017) have shown than several Mediterranean species hitherto assigned to Gibbula were forming a separate clade and should be assigned to the genus Steromphala. They included in the restricted Gibbula clade the species G. magus (type species), G. fanulum and G. ardens. However many other species were not taken into account in this paper and will remain listed in WoRMS under Gibbula until their phylogenetic position is assessed, but possibly do not belong to the restricted Gibbula clade.

== Distribution ==
The species in this genus occur through all seas, except on the coast of the American continent.

== Description ==
The cyrtoconoid (= approaching a conical shape but with convex sides) shell is usually perforate or umbilicate. The spire is moderately elevated. The whorls are often gibbous or tuberculose beneath the sutures, smooth or spirally ribbed. The last whorl is generally angular at the periphery. The aperture is subrhomboidal. The columella is oblique, dentate or subsinuous at the base. The outer lip is acute. The central tooth and the lateral teeth of the radula have well-developed denticulate cusps. The outer lateral teeth are wider.

== Species ==
Species within the genus Gibbula include.

- Gibbula ahena Preston, 1908
- Gibbula albida Gmelin, 1791
- † Gibbula anodosula Sacco, 1896
- Gibbula ardens Von Salis, 1793)
- Gibbula aurantia Nordsieck, 1975
- Gibbula beckeri G.B. Sowerby III, 1901
- Gibbula benzi (Krauss, 1848)
- Gibbula blanfordiana G. Nevill & H. Nevill, 1869
- † Gibbula buchi Harzhauser and Kowalke, 2002 (Dubois, 1831)
- Gibbula candei d'Orbigny, 1844
- Gibbula capensis Gmelin, 1791
- Gibbula cicer (Menke, 1844)
- † Gibbula clanculiforma Landau, Van Dingenen & Ceulemans, 2017
- Gibbula clandestina Rolán & Templado, 2001
- † Gibbula conicomagus Landau, Van Dingenen & Ceulemans, 2017
- Gibbula corallioides Locard, 1898
- † Gibbula dalli Ihering, 1897
- Gibbula delgadensis Nordsieck, 1982
- Gibbula denizi Rolán & Swinnen, 2013
- Gibbula deversa Milaschewitsch, 1916
- Gibbula drepanensis Brugnone, 1873
- Gibbula dupontiana G. Nevill & H. Nevill, 1869
- Gibbula eikoae Tagaro & Dekker, 2006
- † Gibbula euomphala (Philippi, 1836)
- Gibbula fanulum Gmelin, 1791
- † Gibbula filiformis (de Rayneval, Van den Hecke & Ponzi, 1854)
- Gibbula guishanensis Wen-Der Chen & I-Feng Fu, 2008
- Gibbula guttadauri Philippi, 1836
- Gibbula hera Bartsch, 1915
- Gibbula hisseyiana (Tenison-Woods, 1876)
- Gibbula houartiPoppe, Tagaro & Dekker, 2006
- Gibbula joubini Dautzenberg, 1910
- Gibbula leucophaea (Philippi, 1836)
- Gibbula loculosa Gould, 1861 (synonym of Gibbula benzi)
- Gibbula magus (Linnaeus, 1758)
- † Gibbula marianae Landau, Van Dingenen & Ceulemans, 2017
- Gibbula massieri Rolán & Zettler, 2010
- † Gibbula megamagus Cossmann, 1918
- † Gibbula mirabilis (Deshayes, 1863)
- Gibbula multicolor (Krauss, 1848)
- † Gibbula parnensis (Bayan, 1870)
- Gibbula philberti (Récluz, C., 1843)
- † Gibbula podolica Harzhauser and Kowalke, 2002 (Dubois, 1831)
- † Gibbula provosti Ceulemans, Van Dingenen & Landau, 2016
- Gibbula racketti Payraudeau, 1826
- Gibbula rifaca Bartsch, 1915
- † Gibbula saeniensis Chirli & Micali, 2003
- Gibbula sari Fischer-Piette, E., 1942
- Gibbula sementis Rolán & Templado, 2001
- Gibbula senegalensis Menke, 1853
- Gibbula spurca Gould, 1856
- Gibbula stoliczkana (Nevill, G. & H. Nevill, 1869)
- Gibbula subplicata G. Nevill & H. Nevill, 1869
- Gibbula tantilla Monterosato, 1890
- Gibbula tenuilirata Preston, 1909
- † Gibbula tindayaensis Martín-González & Vera-Peláez, 2018
- Gibbula tingitana Pallary, 1901
- Gibbula tryoni Pilsbry, 1889
- Gibbula tumida (Montagu, 1803)
- Gibbula turbinoides Deshayes, 1835
- Gibbula vanwalleghemi Poppe, G.T., S. Tagaro & H. Dekker, 2006
- Gibbula verdensis Rolán & Templado, 2001
- Gibbula vimontiae Monterosato, 1884
- Gibbula zonata (Woods, 1828)

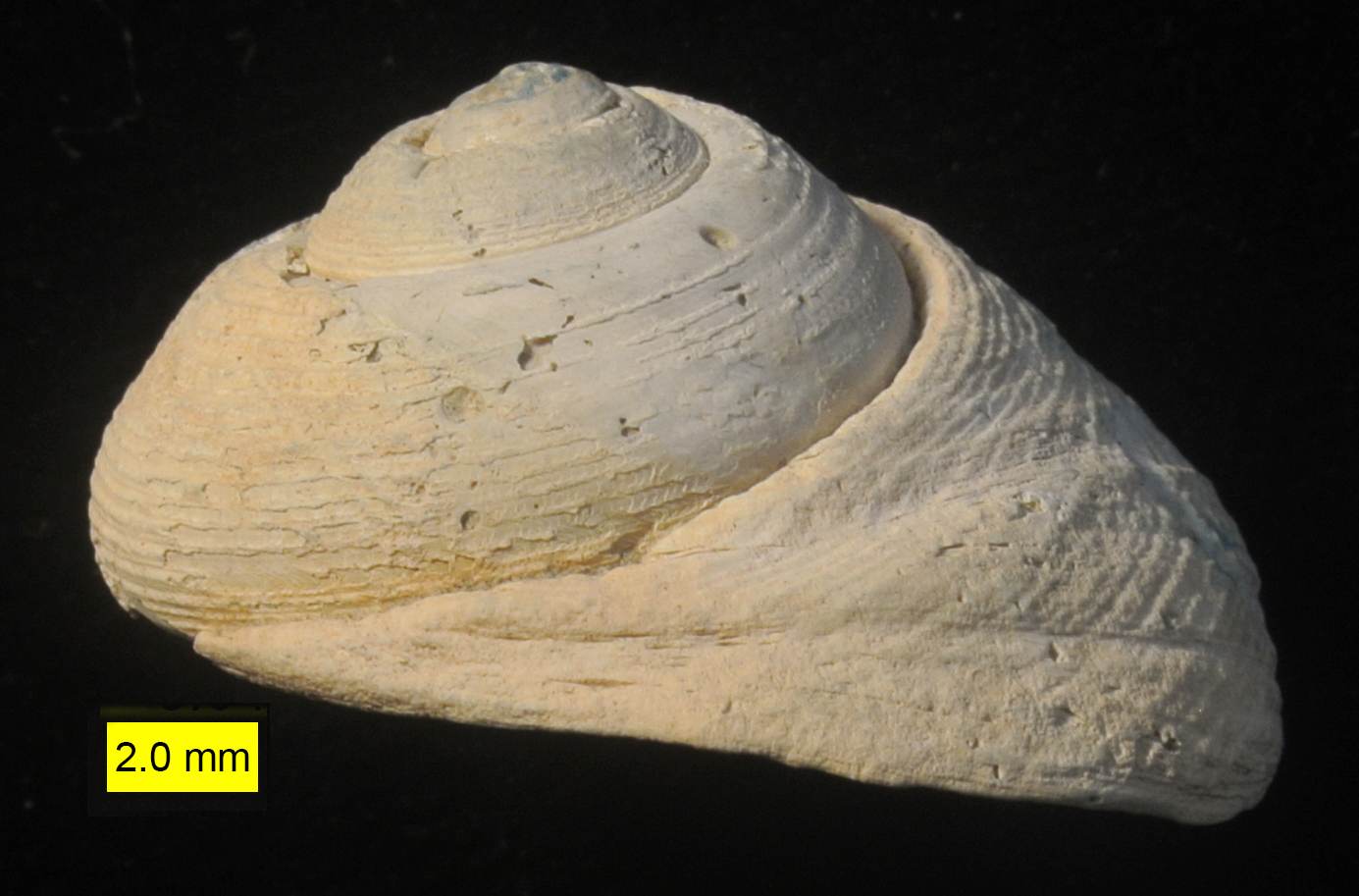
Fossil Gibbula sp. from the Pliocene of Cyprus. Note small predation scars.

Taxon inquirendum

- Gibbula incitabilis Locard, 1904
- Gibbula sculpturata Locard, 1898

== Species brought into synonymy ==
- Gibbula (Calliotrochus) cummingae Kilburn, 1977: synonym of Calliotrochus marmoreus (Pease, 1861)
- Gibbula adansonii Payraudeau, 1826: synonym of Steromphala adansonii (Payraudeau, 1826)
- Gibbula adriatica Philippi, 1844: synonym of Steromphala adriatica (Philippi, 1844)
- Gibbula aegyptica Chenu, 1859: synonym of Gibbula fanulum (Gmelin, 1791)
- Gibbula affinis cognata Pilsbry, H.A., 1903: synonym of Clanculus cognatus (Pilsbry, 1903)
- Gibbula aglaia Bartsch, 1915: synonym of Gibbula tryoni Pilsbry, 1889
- Gibbula altimirai Nordsieck 1982: synonym of Gibbula nivosa A. Adams, 1851
- Gibbula apicalis Nordsieck 1972: synonym of Gibbula ardens Von Salis, 179)
- Gibbula approximata Turton, 1932: synonym of Gibbula cicer (Menke, 1844)
- Gibbula articulata (Gould, 1861): synonym of Pseudominolia articulata (Gould, 1861)
- Gibbula aurantia Nordsieck, F. & F. García-Talavera, 1979 : synonym of Gibbula racketti (Payraudeau, 1826)
- Gibbula awajiensis G. B. Sowerby III, 1914: synonym of Conotalopia mustelina (Gould, 1861)
- Gibbula barbara Monterosato 1884: synonym of Gibbula ardens Von Salis, 179)
- Gibbula bellinii Coen 1930: synonym of Gibbula magus (Linnaeus, 1758)
- Gibbula becki Turton, 1932: synonym of Gibbula multicolor (Krauss, 1848)
- Gibbula bicolor Risso 1826: synonym of Gibbula ardens Von Salis, 179)
- Gibbula cineraria Linnaeus, 1758: synonym of Steromphala cineraria (Linnaeus, 1758)
- Gibbula concinna (Philippi, 1847): synonym of Eurytrochus concinnus (Pilsbry, 1889)
- Gibbula conemenosi Monterosato 1888: synonym of Gibbula adansonii (Payraudeau, 1826)
- Gibbula cummingae Kilburn, 1977: synonym of Calliotrochus marmoreus (Pease, 1861)
- Gibbula danieli (Crosse, 1862): synonym of Eurytrochus danieli (Crosse, 1862)
- Gibbula declivis Forskål, 1775: synonym of Rubritrochus declivis (Forskål, 1775)
- Gibbula De Gregorii Caramagna, 1888: synonym of Ethminolia degregorii (Caramagna, 1888)
- Gibbula delicata Coen 1937: synonym of Gibbula leucophaea (Philippi, 1836)
- Gibbula distincta Turton, 1932: synonym of Gibbula multicolor (Krauss, 1848)
- Gibbula divaricata Linnaeus, 1758: synonym of Steromphala divaricata (Linnaeus, 1758)
- Gibbula docastana Preston, 1909: synonym of Eurytrochus strangei (Adams, A., 1853)
- Gibbula filosa Garrett, 1872: synonym of Eurytrochus danieli (Crosse, 1862)
- Gibbula forskadauri Nordsieck 1982: synonym of Gibbula magus (Linnaeus, 1758)
- Gibbula fucata Gould, 1861: synonym of Gibbula multicolor (Krauss, 1848)
- Gibbula fulgens Gould, 1861: synonym of Gibbula cicer (Menke, 1844)
- Gibbula funiculata Carpenter, 1864: synonym of Lirularia lirulata (Carpenter, 1864)
- Gibbula galbina Hedley & May, 1908: synonym of Nanula galbina H(edley & May, 1908)
- Gibbula gaudiosa Gould, 1861: synonym of Gibbula cicer (Menke, 1844)
- Gibbula gibbosula Brusina, 1865: synonym of Gibbula racketti (Payraudeau, 1826)
- Gibbula globulosa Turton, 1932: synonym of Gibbula cicer (Menke, 1844)
- Gibbula gorgonarum P. Fisher, 1883: synonym of Callumbonella suturalis (Philippi, 1836)
- Gibbula huberi Oberling, 1970: synonym of Gibbula vimontiae Monterosato, 1884
- Gibbula incinta Sowerby, 1894: synonym of Gibbula tryoni Pilsbry, 1889
- Gibbula ivanicsi Brusina: synonym of Gibbula adansonii Payraudeau, 1826
- Gibbula isseli Monterosato, 1888: synonym of Gibbula racketti (Payraudeau, 1826)
- Gibbula kalinota Adams A. 1851: synonym of Gibbula ardens Von Salis, 179)
- Gibbula kowiensis Turton, 1932: synonym of Gibbula benzi (Krauss, 1848)
- Gibbula lacunata Carpenter, 1864: synonym of Lirularia lirulata (Carpenter, 1864)
- Gibbula lauta Turton, 1932: synonym of Gibbula multicolor (Krauss, 1848)
- Gibbula legrandi Tate, R. & May, W.L. 1901: synonym of Minopa legrandi (Petterd, 1879)
- Gibbula macculochi Hedley, 1907: synonym of Eurytrochus maccullochi (Hedley, C., 1907)
- Gibbula marmorea (Pease, 1861): synonym of Calliotrochus marmoreus (Pease, 1861)
- Gibbula medusa Bartsch, 1915: synonym of Gibbula tryoni Pilsbry, 1890
- Gibbula micans Suter, 1897: synonym of Cantharidus artizona A. Adams, 1853
- Gibbula miniata (Anton, 1838): synonym of Clanculus miniatus (Anton, 1838)
- Gibbula musiva Gould, 1861: synonym of Gibbula cicer (Menke, 1844)
- Gibbula nassauiensis "Chemnitz, J.H." Stearns, R.E.C., 1893: synonym of Gibbula senegalensis Menke, 1853
- Gibbula nivosa A. Adams, 1851: synonym of Steromphala nivosa (A. Adams, 1853)
- Gibbula obesula Locard, 1898: synonym of Calliostoma obesulum (Locard, 1898)
- Gibbula obliquata (Gmelin, 1791): synonym of Gibbula umbilicalis (da Costa, 1778)
- Gibbula optabilis Carpenter, 1864: synonym of Lirularia lirulata (Carpenter, 1864)
- Gibbula ornata Turton, 1932: synonym of Gibbula multicolor (Krauss, 1848)
- Gibbula pantanellii Caramagna, 1888: synonym of Monilea pantanellii (Caramagna, 1888)
- Gibbula parcipicta Carpenter, 1864: synonym of Lirularia lirulata (Carpenter, 1864)
- Gibbula pennanti (Philippi, 1846): synonym of Steromphala pennanti (Philippi, 1846)
- Gibbula perspectiva G.B. Sowerby, 1900: synonym of Agagus agagus Jousseaume, 1894
- Gibbula pintado Gould, 1861: synonym of Gibbula benzi (Krauss, 1848)
- Gibbula phasianella (Deshayes, 1863): synonym of Calliotrochus marmoreus (Pease, 1861)
- Gibbula polychroma Turton, 1932: synonym of Gibbula multicolor (Krauss, 1848)
- Gibbula protumida Locard 1886: synonym of Gibbula magus (Linnaeus, 1758)
- Gibbula pseudotumida Nordsieck, 1982: synonym of Gibbula racketti (Payraudeau, 1826)
- Gibbula pulchella Turton, 1932: synonym of Gibbula multicolor (Krauss, 1848)
- Gibbula pulcherrima A. Adams, 1855: synonym of Rubritrochus pulcherrimus (A. Adams, 1855)
- Gibbula punctocostata A. Adams, 1853: synonym of Astele punctocostata (A. Adams, 1853)
- Gibbula purpurata Brusina, 1865: synonym of Gibbula rarilineata (Michaud, 1829)
- Gibbula purpurea Coen 1930: synonym of Gibbula albida Gmelin, 1791
- Gibbula pygmaea Risso, 1826: synonym of Gibbula racketti (Payraudeau, 1826)
- Gibbula rarilineata Michaud, 1829: synonym of Steromphala rarilineata (Michaud, 1829)
- Gibbula richardi (Payraudeau, 1826): synonym of Phorcus richardi (Payraudeau, 1826)
- Gibbula rotella Monterosato 1888: synonym of Gibbula nivosa A. Adams, 1851
- Gibbula redimita Gould, 1861: synonym of Lirularia redimita (Gould, 1861)
- Gibbula reedi Verco, 1907: synonym of Fossarina (Minopa) reedi (Verco, 1907)
- Gibbula reevei (Montrouzier in Souverbie & Montrouzier, 1866): synonym of Trochus reevei Montrouzier in Souverbie & Montrouzier, 1866
- Gibbula sanguinea Risso 1826: synonym of Gibbula ardens Von Salis, 179)
- Gibbula sepulchralis (Melvill, 1899): synonym of Priotrochus obscurus obscurus (Wood, 1828)
- Gibbula specialis Coen 1937: synonym of Gibbula divaricata (Linnaeus, 1758)
- Gibbula spratti (Forbes, 1844): synonym of Steromphala spratti (Forbes, 1844)
- Gibbula subcincta Monterosato 1888: synonym of Gibbula ardens Von Salis, 179)
- Gibbula sulcosa Adams A. 1851: synonym of Gibbula ardens Von Salis, 179)
- Gibbula sulliottii Monterosato, 1888: synonym of Gibbula adansonii (Payraudeau, 1826)
- Gibbula taiwanensis Chen, 2006: synonym of Pseudotalopia taiwanensis (Chen, 2006)
- Gibbula tasmanica Petterd, 1879: synonym of Nanula tasmanica (Petterd, 1879)
- Gibbula tesserula Tenison-Woods, 1880: synonym of Chlorodiloma odontis (W. Wood, 1828)
- Gibbula thalia Bartsch, 1915: synonym of Gibbula cicer (Menke, 1844)
- Gibbula thiara Coen 1930: synonym of Gibbula albida Gmelin, 1791
- Gibbula townsendi Sowerby III, 1895: synonym of Agagus agagus Jousseaume, 1894
- Gibbula tuberculosa auct. non d'Orbigny, 1842: synonym of Arene bitleri Olsson & McGinty, 1958
- Gibbula tumidulina Locard, 1904: synonym of Gibbula racketti (Payraudeau, 1826)
- Gibbula umbilicalis (da Costa, 1778), common on the western coast of the U.K. and Ireland: synonym of Steromphala umbilicalis (da Costa, 1778)
- Gibbula umbilicaris (Linnaeus, 1758): synonym of Steromphala umbilicaris (Linnaeus, 1758)
- Gibbula varia (Linnaeus, 1758): synonym of Steromphala varia (Linnaeus, 1758)
- Gibbula variegata Risso, 1826: synonym of Gibbula varia (Linnaeus, 1758)
- Gibbula venusta Adams A. 1851: synonym of Gibbula ardens Von Salis, 179)
- Gibbula virescens Nordsieck 1972: synonym of Gibbula adansonii (Payraudeau, 1826)
- Gibbula vulcanica Coen 1930: synonym of Gibbula magus (Linnaeus, 1758)
- Gibbula whitechurchi Turton, 1932: synonym of Ilanga whitechurchi (Turton, 1932)

Nomen dubium

- Gibbula rosea (Gmelin, 1791)
