= Gibbula tantilla =

Scientific classification
- Kingdom: Animalia
- Phylum: Mollusca
- Class: Gastropoda
- Subclass: Vetigastropoda
- Order: Trochida
- Superfamily: Trochoidea
- Family: Trochidae
- Genus: Gibbula
- Species: G. tantilla

Binomial name
- Gibbula tantilla Monterosato, 1890

Species of gastropod

Gibbula tantilla is a species of sea snail, a marine gastropod mollusk in the family Trochidae, the top snails.

In 1991, Smriglio, Mariottini & Gravina, designated a lectotype and figure. They recognized Gibbula tantilla as a valid species, but considered it as possibly extinct.

== Description ==
The shell is similar to the shell of the species Gibbula racketti. It contains six tumid whorls. The aperture is subquadrate. The base of the shell is rounded. The umbilicus is reduced to a small hole.

== Distribution ==
This species occurs in the Mediterranean Sea off the island of Sicily, Italy.
