= G. senegalensis =

G. senegalensis may refer to:

- Galago senegalensis, the Senegal bushbaby, Senegal galago, lesser galago or lesser bush baby, a small nocturnal primate species
- Gibbula senegalensis, a sea snail species
- Guiera senegalensis, a flowering plant species

== See also ==
- The dictionary definition of Senegalensis at Wiktionary
