= Gibbula corallioides =

Scientific classification
- Kingdom: Animalia
- Phylum: Mollusca
- Class: Gastropoda
- Subclass: Vetigastropoda
- Order: Trochida
- Superfamily: Trochoidea
- Family: Trochidae
- Genus: Gibbula
- Species: G. corallioides

Binomial name
- Gibbula corallioides Locard, 1898

Species of gastropod

Gibbula corallioides is a species of sea snail, a marine gastropod mollusk in the family Trochidae, the top snails.

== Description ==
It is similar to Gibbula magus and has often been considered in the past a synonym of this species. But it is somewhat smaller and the color variations are different.

== Distribution ==
This species occurs in the Atlantic Ocean off the Cape Verde Archipelago.
