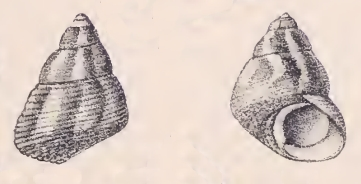
- Drawing with two views of a shell of Gibbula stoliczkana

Scientific classification
- Kingdom: Animalia
- Phylum: Mollusca
- Class: Gastropoda
- Subclass: Vetigastropoda
- Order: Trochida
- Superfamily: Trochoidea
- Family: Trochidae
- Genus: Gibbula
- Species: G. stoliczkana

Binomial name
- Gibbula stoliczkana (Nevill, G. & H. Nevill, 1869)

Synonyms
- Trochus stoliczkanus Fischer

= Gibbula stoliczkana =

Species of gastropod

Gibbula stoliczkana is a species of sea snail, a marine gastropod mollusk in the family Trochidae, the top snails.

== Description ==
The size of the shell varies between 6 mm and 12 mm. The small, rather solid, umbilicate shell has an elevated conical shape. It is reddish-brown or olive-brown, flammulated above with white, the base tessellated brown and white. The spire is elevated. The about 5 whorls are slightly convex, lusterless, and spirally lirate. The lirae number about 9 on the penultimate whorl. The body whorl is high. The lip is a little deflected toward the aperture. The periphery is angular. The base of the shell is angular around the umbilical region, with about 8 concentric lirae, the outer ones often obsolete. The aperture is oblique, about half the length of the shell, somewhat triangular, brilliantly iridescent within. The white columella is arcuate, and truncate at the base. The white umbilicus is narrow. The surface is lusterless. The lirae are rather coarse, broad and flat. The lower right hand margin of the aperture is decidedly produced, and the base is usually somewhat notched or emarginate as in the European Gibbula tumida. The white flames are occasionally absent.

== Distribution ==
This marine species occurs off the Philippines and Sri Lanka.
