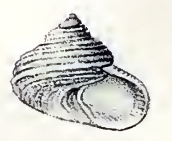
- Drawing of a shell of Gibbula zonata

Scientific classification
- Kingdom: Animalia
- Phylum: Mollusca
- Class: Gastropoda
- Subclass: Vetigastropoda
- Order: Trochida
- Superfamily: Trochoidea
- Family: Trochidae
- Genus: Gibbula
- Species: G. zonata

Binomial name
- Gibbula zonata (Woods, 1828)

Synonyms
- Oxystele zonata Wood, Sowerby, 1892; Trochus cingulatus Muhlf, 1816; Trochus leaensis Watson; Trochus menkeanus Philippi; Trochus zonatus Woods, 1828

= Gibbula zonata =

Species of gastropod

Gibbula zonata is a species of sea snail, a marine gastropod mollusk in the family Trochidae, the top snails.

== Description ==
The size of the shell varies between 6 mm and 10 mm. The rather solid shell is imperforate but excavated at the place of the umbilicus. It has a depressed-conical shape. It is whitish, with numerous spiral bauds and lines of purplish-brown. The surface is very lightly obliquely striate, closely, densely finely spirally striate, generally with three strong carinae, one at periphery, the others above. The about 5 whorls are convex, those of the upper surface bicarinate. The convex body whorl is carinate or subcarinate. The oblique aperture is rounded-quadrangular. It is nacreous inside with slight sulci at the positions of the external carina. The columella is a little straightened.

== Distribution ==
This species occurs in the Atlantic Ocean off Namibia and the western coast of South Africa; in the Indian Ocean off the Agulhas Bank.
