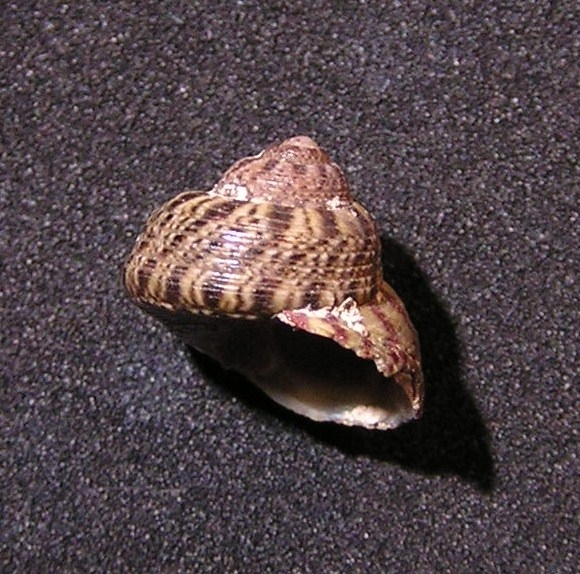

Scientific classification
- Kingdom: Animalia
- Phylum: Mollusca
- Class: Gastropoda
- Subclass: Vetigastropoda
- Order: Trochida
- Superfamily: Trochoidea
- Family: Trochidae
- Genus: Gibbula
- Species: G. spurca

Binomial name
- Gibbula spurca (Gould, 1856)

Synonyms
- Trochus spurcus Gould, 1856

= Gibbula spurca =

Species of gastropod

Gibbula spurca is a species of sea snail, a marine gastropod mollusk in the family Trochidae, the top snails.

== Description ==
The size of an adult shell varies between 8 mm and 12 mm. The small, solid shell is globose-conical, sculptured with fine, shallow, revolving alternate grooves and elevations. The yellowish shell is shining and delicately variegated with oblique zigzag dusky lines. The two colors are about in equal proportions with a series of somewhat conspicuous quadrate dusky and yellow spots just below the suture. There are four or five ventricose whorls. The suture is deeply impressed. The base is moderately conical, imperforate or minutely umbilicated. The aperture is very oblique. The rounded columella is arcuate. The outer subnacreous lip is sharp and smooth.

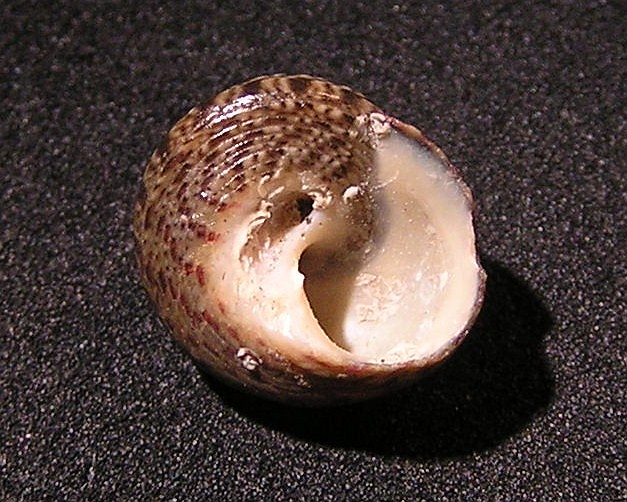
Apertural view of Gibbula spurca

== Distribution ==
This species occurs in the Atlantic Ocean off Madeira and the Canary Islands.
