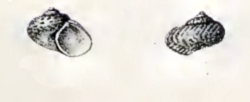
- Drawing with two views of a shell of Gibbula drepanensis

Scientific classification
- Kingdom: Animalia
- Phylum: Mollusca
- Class: Gastropoda
- Subclass: Vetigastropoda
- Order: Trochida
- Superfamily: Trochoidea
- Family: Trochidae
- Genus: Gibbula
- Species: G. drepanensis

Binomial name
- Gibbula drepanensis (Brugnone, 1873)

Synonyms
- Trochus drepanensis Brugnone 1873

= Gibbula drepanensis =

Species of gastropod

Gibbula drepanensis is a species of sea snail, a marine gastropod mollusk in the family Trochidae, the top snails.

== Description ==
The size of the shell varies between 2 mm and 5 mm. The small shell is narrowly umbilicate, depressed, and stomatella-shaped. It is whitish, zigzagly striped with red, the stripes often broken into spots, white around the umbilicus. The spire is very short. The sutures are impressed. The 3 to 4 whorls are convex and rapidly widening. They are encircled by spiral striae which are nearly obliterated on the body whorl. This body whorl is very large and depressed. The large aperture is oblique and subcircular. The columella is arcuate.

== Distribution ==
This species occurs in the Mediterranean Sea and in the Atlantic Ocean off the Canary Islands.
