= Gibbula dalli =

Scientific classification
- Kingdom: Animalia
- Phylum: Mollusca
- Class: Gastropoda
- Subclass: Vetigastropoda
- Order: Trochida
- Superfamily: Trochoidea
- Family: Trochidae
- Genus: Gibbula
- Species: G. dalli

Binomial name
- Gibbula dalli Ihering 1897

Species of gastropod

Gibbula dalli is a species of sea snail, a marine gastropod mollusk in the family Trochidae, the top snails.

It is only known as a fossil from the Miocene of Chile and the Eocene of Argentina. It occurred between 55.8 Ma and 15.97 Ma ago. It was a marine epifaunal grazer in the offshore zone.
