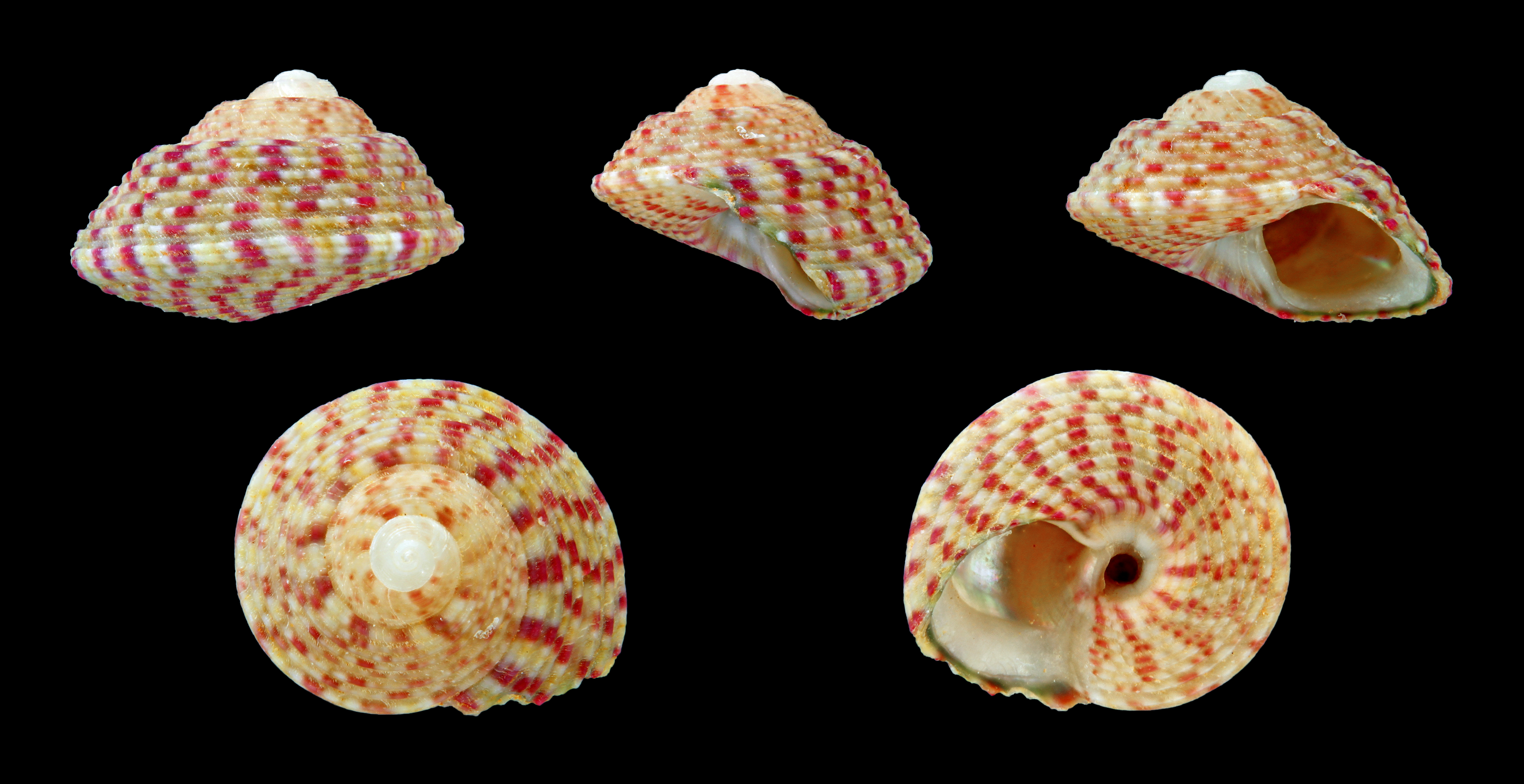
- Several views of a shell of Steromphala rarilineata

Scientific classification
- Kingdom: Animalia
- Phylum: Mollusca
- Class: Gastropoda
- Subclass: Vetigastropoda
- Order: Trochida
- Family: Trochidae
- Subfamily: Cantharidinae
- Genus: Steromphala
- Species: S. rarilineata

Binomial name
- Steromphala rarilineata (Michaud, 1829)

Synonyms
- Gibbula divaricata var. rarilineata (Michaud, 1829); Gibbula purpurata Brusina, 1865; Gibbula rarilineata var. crimeana Anistratenko & Starobogatov, 1991; Gibbula rarilineata var. pulchella Pallary 1919; Steromphala crimeana Anistratenko & Starobogatov, 1991; Trochus cossurensis Monterosato, 1875 (synonym); Trochus rarilineatus Michaud, 1829 (original description)

= Steromphala rarilineata =

Species of gastropod

Steromphala rarilineata is a species of sea snail, a marine gastropod mollusk in the family Trochidae, the top snails.

== Description ==
The size of the shell varies between 8 mm and 14 mm. The shell diverges from Gibbula divaricata by being smaller, and more conical, and having an angulate periphery and a flattened base.

== Distribution ==
Steromphala rarilineata is found in relatively warm European waters off the coast of Spain, Greece, and Portugal; in the Black Sea off Ukraine; in the Atlantic Ocean off the Azores and the Canary Islands.
