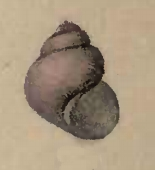
- Drawing of a shell of Gibbula hisseyiana

Scientific classification
- Kingdom: Animalia
- Phylum: Mollusca
- Class: Gastropoda
- Subclass: Vetigastropoda
- Order: Trochida
- Superfamily: Trochoidea
- Family: Trochidae
- Genus: Gibbula
- Species: G. hisseyiana

Binomial name
- Gibbula hisseyiana (Tenison-Woods, J.E. 1876)

Synonyms
- Gibbula (Hisseyagibbula) hisseyiana (Tenison-Woods, J.E. 1876); Littorina hisseyiana Tenison-Woods, J.E. 1876 (original description)

= Gibbula hisseyiana =

Species of gastropod

Gibbula hisseyiana is a species of minute sea snail, a marine gastropod mollusk in the family Trochidae, the top snails.

== Description ==
The size of the shell varies between 1.5 mm and 3 mm. The thin, ventricose shell is extremely minute. It has a globosely turbinate shape. The short spire is obtuse, and densely spirally striate. It is whitish with angulately undulate olive streaks, which are often confluent. The olive markings vary into lines and deeply shaded spots. Sometimes the shell is uniformly olive, or even blue black. The five whorls are rounded. The aperture is orbiculate and entire. The acute, internal lip subreflexed. The columella is subperforate.

About 50 specimens were found in the stomach of a yellow-eye mullet, Aldrichetta forsteri (Valenciennes, 1836)

== Distribution ==
This species is endemic to Australia and occurs off Tasmania.
