= Gibbula massieri =

Scientific classification
- Kingdom: Animalia
- Phylum: Mollusca
- Class: Gastropoda
- Subclass: Vetigastropoda
- Order: Trochida
- Superfamily: Trochoidea
- Family: Trochidae
- Genus: Gibbula
- Species: G. massieri

Binomial name
- Gibbula massieri Rolán & Zettler, 2010

Species of gastropod

Gibbula massieri is a species of sea snail, a marine gastropod mollusk in the family Trochidae, the top snails.

== Description ==
The shell of G. massieri is conical with alternating brown and white chords. The size of the shell varies between 5 mm and 6.5 mm.

The head of the snail has three tentacles on each side.

== Distribution ==
This species occurs in the Atlantic Ocean off Namibia.
