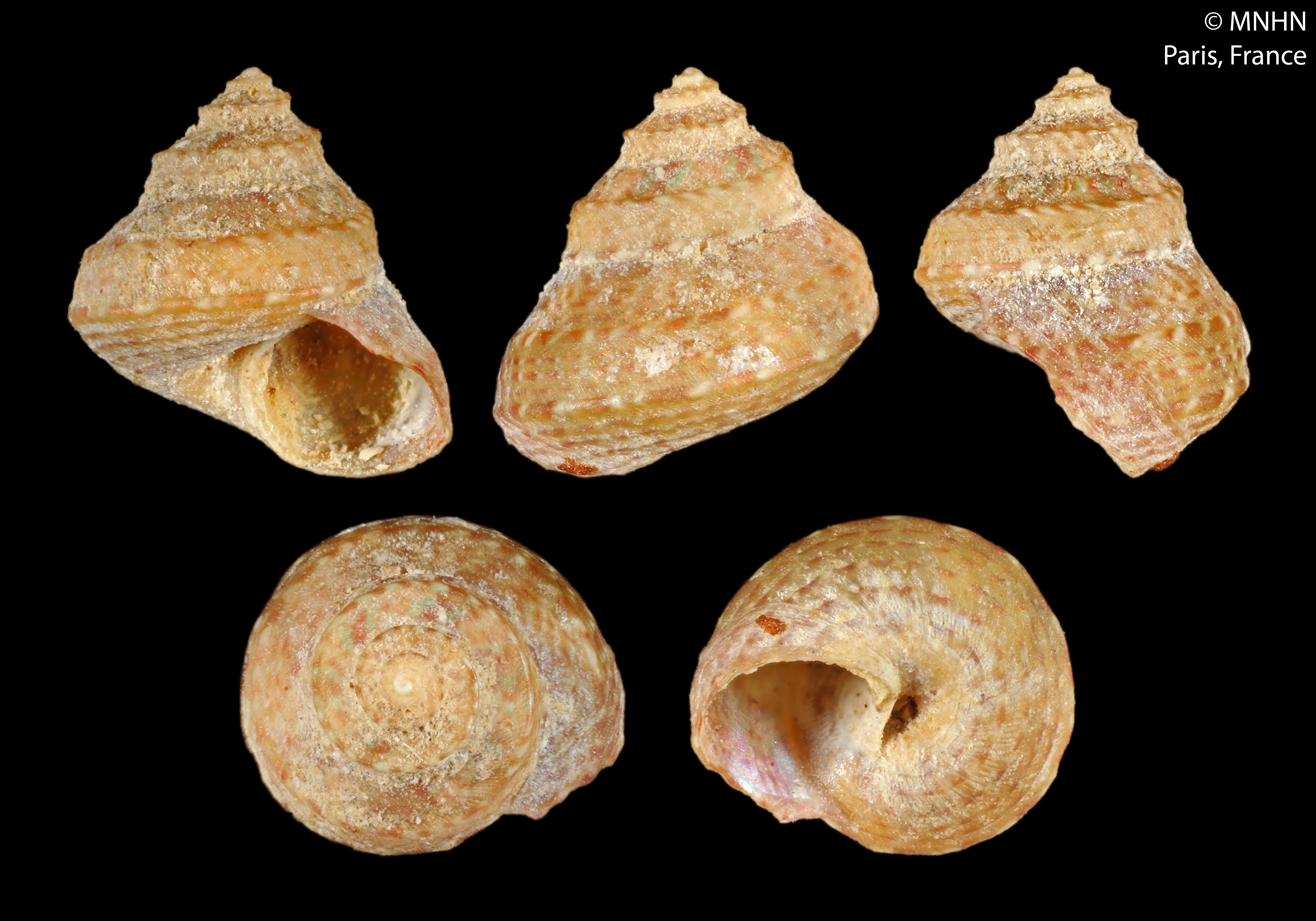
- Shell of Gibbula tingitana (syntype at MNHN, Paris)

Scientific classification
- Kingdom: Animalia
- Phylum: Mollusca
- Class: Gastropoda
- Subclass: Vetigastropoda
- Order: Trochida
- Superfamily: Trochoidea
- Family: Trochidae
- Genus: Gibbula
- Species: G. tingitana

Binomial name
- Gibbula tingitana Pallary, 1902

Synonyms
- Gibbula tingitana var. dilatata Pallary 1920; Gibbula tingitana var. nigra Pallary, 1902; Gibbula tingitana var. pyramidata Pallary 1920

= Gibbula tingitana =

Species of gastropod

Gibbula tingitana is a species of sea snail, a marine gastropod mollusk in the family Trochidae, the top snails.

== Description ==
The size of the shell varies between 2 mm and 5 mm.

== Distribution ==
This species occurs in the Western Mediterranean Sea and off Morocco (Tangiers).
