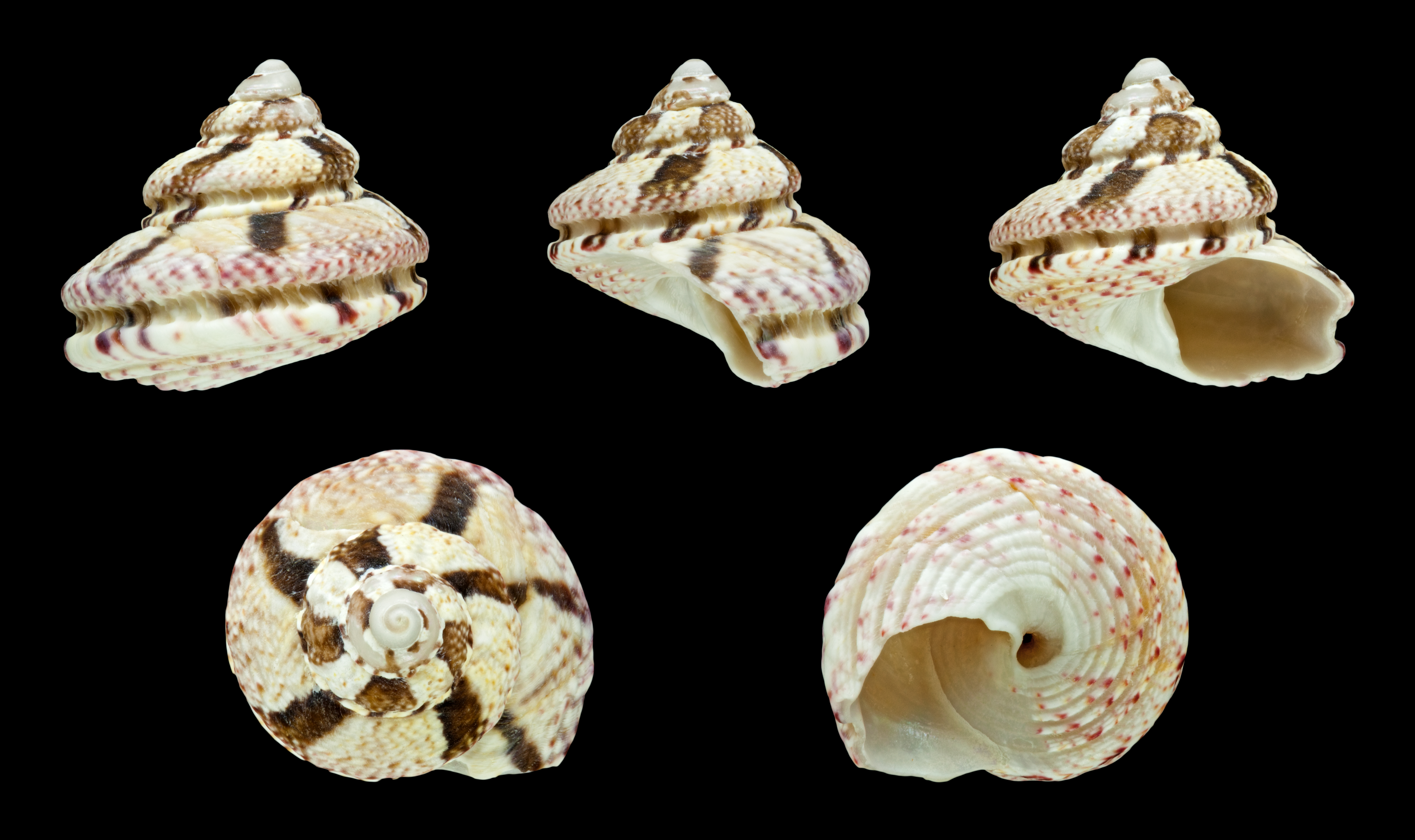
- A shell of Gibbula fanulum

Scientific classification
- Kingdom: Animalia
- Phylum: Mollusca
- Class: Gastropoda
- Subclass: Vetigastropoda
- Order: Trochida
- Superfamily: Trochoidea
- Family: Trochidae
- Genus: Gibbula
- Species: G. fanulum

Binomial name
- Gibbula fanulum (Gmelin, 1791)

Synonyms
- Forskalia fanulum (Gmelin, 1791); Forskalia fanulum var. rubropicta Coen, 1937; Gibbula aegyptica Chenu, 1859; Trochus fanulum Gmelin, 1791 (original description); Trochus fanulum var. albosordida Bucquoy, Dautzenberg & Dollfus 1884; Trochus fanulum var. rubra Bucquoy, Dautzenberg & Dollfus 1884; Trochus fanulum var. varia Bucquoy, Dautzenberg & Dollfus 1884; Trochus tuberculatus Risso 1826; Trochus undulatus Risso 1826; Turbo aegyptius Gmelin 1791

= Gibbula fanulum =

Species of sea snail

Gibbula fanulum is a species of sea snail, a marine gastropod mollusk in the family Trochidae, the top snails.

== Description ==
The size of the shell varies between 9 mm and 19 mm. The solid, umbilicate or perforate shell has a conical shape. It is whitish, radiately maculated above and dotted beneath with red or rich brown. There are several color mutations. The conical, turreted spire is acuminate and somewhat scalariform. The about 7 whorls are very convex, spirally lirate, and radiately costate above. They are bicarinated at the periphery, and encircled by a deep canal. The convex base of the shell bears about 5 spiral lirae. The oblique aperture is rounded. The columella is sinuous in the middle (not concave, nor dentate at the base as in Rubritrochus declivis (Forskål, 1775)) and arcuate above. The broad umbilicus is funnel-shaped, or narrow and almost closed,

== Distribution ==
This marine species occurs off Southern Portugal and in the Mediterranean Sea.
