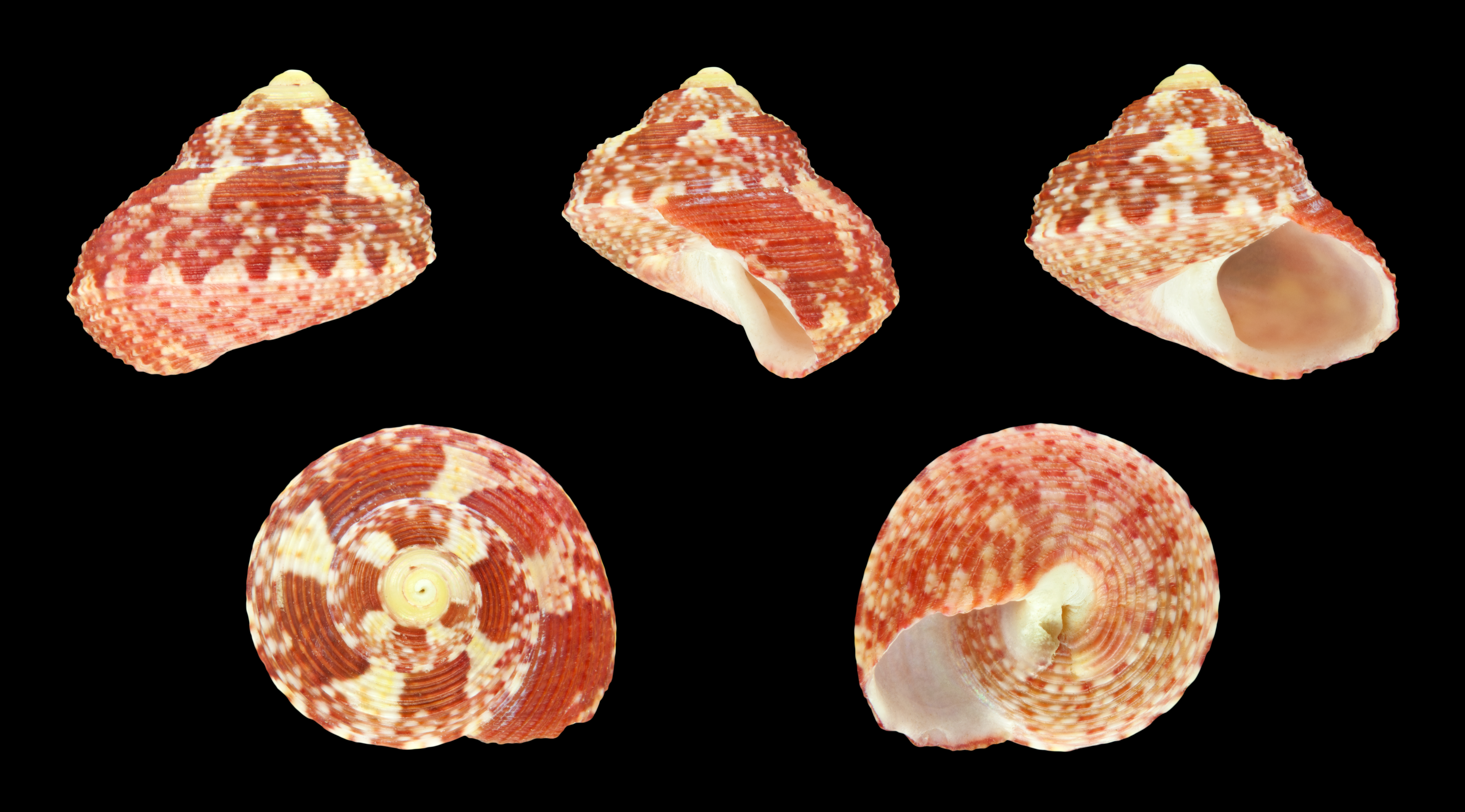
- A shell of Gibbula benzi

Scientific classification
- Kingdom: Animalia
- Phylum: Mollusca
- Class: Gastropoda
- Subclass: Vetigastropoda
- Order: Trochida
- Superfamily: Trochoidea
- Family: Trochidae
- Genus: Gibbula
- Species: G. benzi

Binomial name
- Gibbula benzi (Krauss, 1848)

Synonyms
- Gibbula benzi var. affinis Turton, 1932; Gibbula kowiensis Turton, 1932; Gibbula loculosa Gould, 1861; Gibbula pintado Gould, 1861; Margarita pintado Gould, 1861; Trochus benzi Krauss, 1848 (original description); Trochus ludwigi Krauss, 1848

= Gibbula benzi =

Species of gastropod

Gibbula benzi is a species of sea snail, a marine gastropod mollusk in the family Trochidae, the top snails.

== Description ==
The size of the shell varies between 7 mm and 12 mm. The thin, perforate shell has an orbicular-conoid shape with irregularly transversely costate striae. The color is various, it is purplish, maculate with whitish, orange-yellow or rose-red, with traces of clear spots at the suture, or else purple-red with white flecks. The 5 whorls are moderately convex, separated by a distinct suture. The body whorl is ventricose, subangular in the middle. The convex base of the shell is striate. The rotund-quadrate aperture is white within. The oblique columella is concave and dilated above. The narrow umbilicus is profound.

The slightly elevated, rather narrow, transverse striae are crowded, blunt, and very unequal above, on the base rather regular and elevated. The striae number 4 on the penultimate whorl, about 6 above the periphery of the body whorl, with here and there an intermediate smaller one, and upon the base 10 less elevated ones. The interstices look pitted on account of the elevated incremental striae that cross them. Young examples are carinated, but old ones have the last whorl rounded, wide and very convex. The columella has a somewhat reflexed margin, which is a trifle widened above, slightly covering the umbilicus. It passes imperceptibly into the outer lip, and is united above with the latter by a very thin white callus. The umbilicus is deep, very narrow, longitudinally very finely striated. It is funnel-shaped at the opening, and is bounded by an obtuse but distinct keel.

== Distribution ==
This species occurs in the Indian Ocean from Saldanha Bay to Northern Transkei, Rep. South Africa; off Cape of Good Hope.
