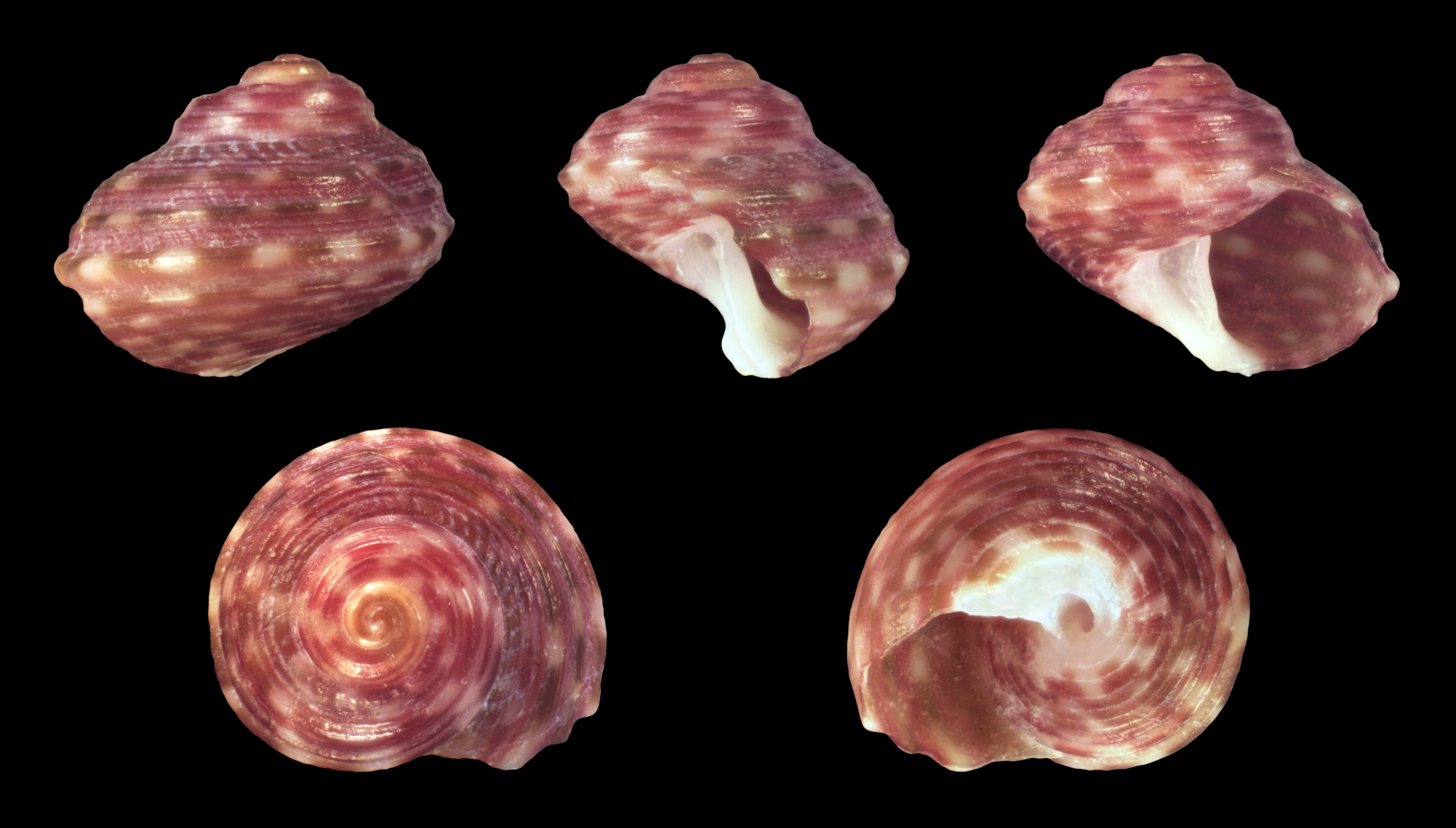
- Red form of Gibbula philberti

Scientific classification
- Kingdom: Animalia
- Phylum: Mollusca
- Class: Gastropoda
- Subclass: Vetigastropoda
- Order: Trochida
- Superfamily: Trochoidea
- Family: Trochidae
- Genus: Gibbula
- Species: G. philberti

Binomial name
- Gibbula philberti (Récluz, 1843)

Synonyms
- Gibbula philberti var. bicarinata Coen 1937; Gibbula philberti var. minima Pallary 1912; Gibbula philberti var. solitaria Monterosato 1888; Trochus michaudi de Blainville, 1830 (dubious synonym); Trochus philberti Récluz, 1843 (original description); Trochus philberti var. grisea Bucquoy, Dautzenberg & Dollfus 1884; Trochus philberti var. nigra Bucquoy, Dautzenberg & Dollfus 1884; Trochus villicus Philippi, 1844

= Gibbula philberti =

Species of gastropod

Gibbula philberti is a species of sea snail, a marine gastropod mollusk in the family Trochidae, the top snails.

== Description ==
The size of the shell varies between 8 mm and 13 mm. The thin, small, umbilicate shell has a conical shape. The coloration is very variable, sometimes uniform dark brown or red, sometimes cinereous, longitudinally clouded with brown, or with spiral series of blackish dots. The low-conic spire is gradate. The sutures are impressed. The 6 whorls are a little gibbous just below the sutures, causing the spire to be somewhat turreted. The whorls are encircled by numerous fine unequal lirulae or striae. The periphery is obtusely angular. The base of the shell is convex, generally a little more coarsely lirate than the upper surface. The aperture is subquadrangular, oblique, and not angled at the junction of basal lip and columella. The columella is perceptibly arcuate. The large, white umbilicus is funnel-shaped and margined by one or several spiral riblets. The shell exhibits a great variation in the development of the spiral riblets. Sometimes all are small, nearly equal, and sometimes several larger ones are developed upon the upper surface.

== Distribution ==
This species occurs in the Mediterranean Sea and in the Atlantic Ocean off Spain and Portugal.
