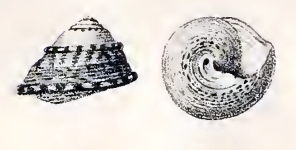
- Drawing with two views of a shell of Gibbula capensis

Scientific classification
- Kingdom: Animalia
- Phylum: Mollusca
- Class: Gastropoda
- Subclass: Vetigastropoda
- Order: Trochida
- Superfamily: Trochoidea
- Family: Trochidae
- Genus: Gibbula
- Species: G. capensis

Binomial name
- Gibbula capensis (Gmelin, 1791)

Synonyms
- Clanculus capensis (Gmelin, 1791); Trochus capensis Gmelin, 1791

= Gibbula capensis =

Species of gastropod

Gibbula capensis is a species of sea snail, a marine gastropod mollusk in the family Trochidae, the top snails.

== Description ==
The size of the shell varies between 10 mm and 14 mm. The narrowly umbilicated shell has a conoid-depressed shape with 5 whorls. The first whorl is roseate, eroded, the following convex above, depressed beneath, whitish or rosy, flammulated with brownish-violet radiating maculations, obliquely striate and spirally lirate. The lirae are flat, narrow and not granose. The body whorl is dilated, subangulate above, depresso-carinated at the periphery, convex beneath and ornamented with 9 concentric reddish lirae. The aperture is oblique and subquadrate. The lip is simple. The columella is arcuate, denticulate at base, slightly calloused above, almost covering the umbilicus.

== Distribution ==
This marine species occurs off the Western Cape, and Saldanha Bay to Cape Agulhas, Rep. South Africa
