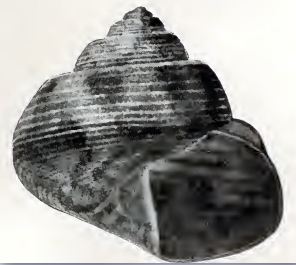
- Apertural view of a shell of Gibbula hera

Scientific classification
- Kingdom: Animalia
- Phylum: Mollusca
- Class: Gastropoda
- Subclass: Vetigastropoda
- Order: Trochida
- Superfamily: Trochoidea
- Family: Trochidae
- Genus: Gibbula
- Species: G. hera

Binomial name
- Gibbula hera Bartsch, 1915

= Gibbula hera =

Species of gastropod

Gibbula hera is a species of sea snail, a marine gastropod mollusk in the family Trochidae, the top snails. The World Register of Marine Species lists Gibbula hera Bartsch, 1915 as a taxon inquirendum.

== Description ==
The height of the shell attains 5.6 mm, its diameter 7.3 mm. The shell is subglobose. It is very dark brown, mottled and streaked with yellow horn color. The 2 1/2 nuclear whorls are well rounded and smooth. The 2 1/8 postnuclear whorls are well rounded and decidedly shouldered at the summit. They are marked between this and the suture by broad, depressed, spiral cords, of which five occur upon the first, six upon the second, while the body whorl has eight, owing to splitting of the primary cords. The spaces that separate the cords are less than one-half the width of the cords and are very feebly impressed. In addition to the above sculpture the spire is marked with feeble, decidedly retractive lines of growth which pass over the cords and grooves. The periphery of the body whorl is subangulated, marked by a slender spiral cord. by six, narrow, flattened, spiral bands and between these and the umbilical chink by seven additional bands of about double the width of the former. The umbilicus covered with a white callus. The aperture is subcircular and very oblique. The outer lip is thin at the edge and thick within. The columella is strong and decidedly curved. The parietal wall is covered by a moderately thick callus.

== Distribution ==
This marine species occurs off Cape of Good Hope, South Africa
