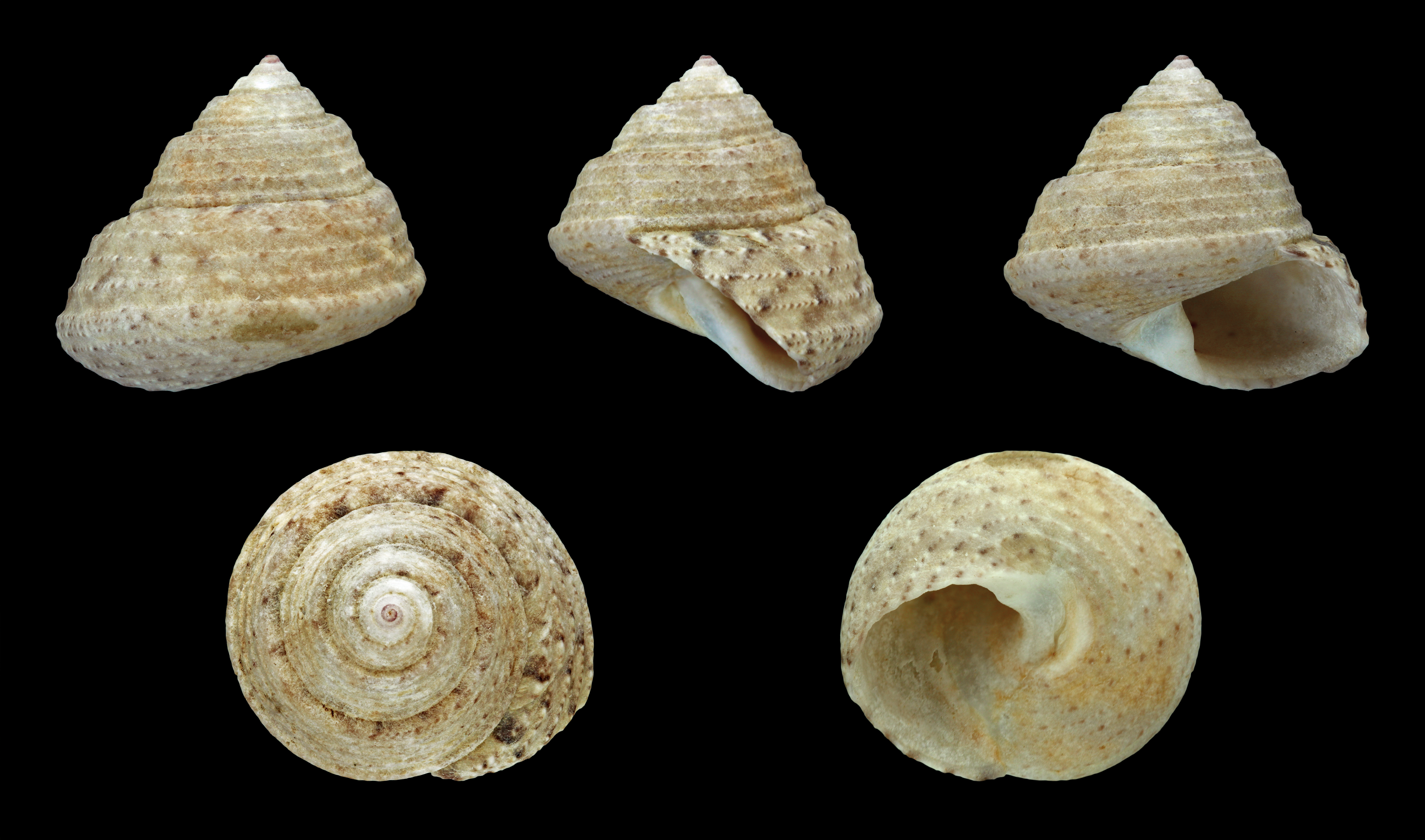
- Shell of Gibbula albida

Scientific classification
- Domain: Eukaryota
- Kingdom: Animalia
- Phylum: Mollusca
- Class: Gastropoda
- Subclass: Vetigastropoda
- Order: Trochida
- Superfamily: Trochoidea
- Family: Trochidae
- Genus: Gibbula
- Species: G. albida

Binomial name
- Gibbula albida (Gmelin, 1790)

Synonyms
- Gibbula purpurea Coen, 1930; Gibbula thiara Coen, 1930; Trochocochlea castriotae Bellini, 1903; Trochus albidus Gmelin, 1790 (original combination); Trochus albidus var. pontica Milaschewitsch, 1908; Trochus biasoletti Philippi, 1836; Trochus bornii Cantraine 1835; Trochus cinerarius Linnaeus, 1758; Trochus clodianus Nardo, 1847; Trochus lyciacus Forbes, 1844; Trochus magulus Deshayes, 1835; Trochus quadratus Dillwyn, 1817

= Gibbula albida =

Species of gastropod

Gibbula albida, common name the whitish gibbula, is a species of small sea snail, a marine gastropod mollusc in the family Trochidae, the top snails.

== Description ==
The size of the shell varies between 10 mm and 24 mm. The solid, umbilicate or imperforate shell has a conical shape. it is whitish, painted with longitudinal stripes of red, brown or purple, the base striped, maculated or mottled. The acute spire contains 7 whorls. These are tumid below the sutures and sometimes obsoletely plicate there and spirally lirate. The body whorl is tumid at the periphery and convex beneath. The columella is slightly sinuous and prominent in the middle. The white umbilicus is funnel-shaped when open, frequently closed.

== Distribution ==
This species occurs in the Atlantic Ocean, the Mediterranean Sea, the Black Sea and the Sea of Azov
