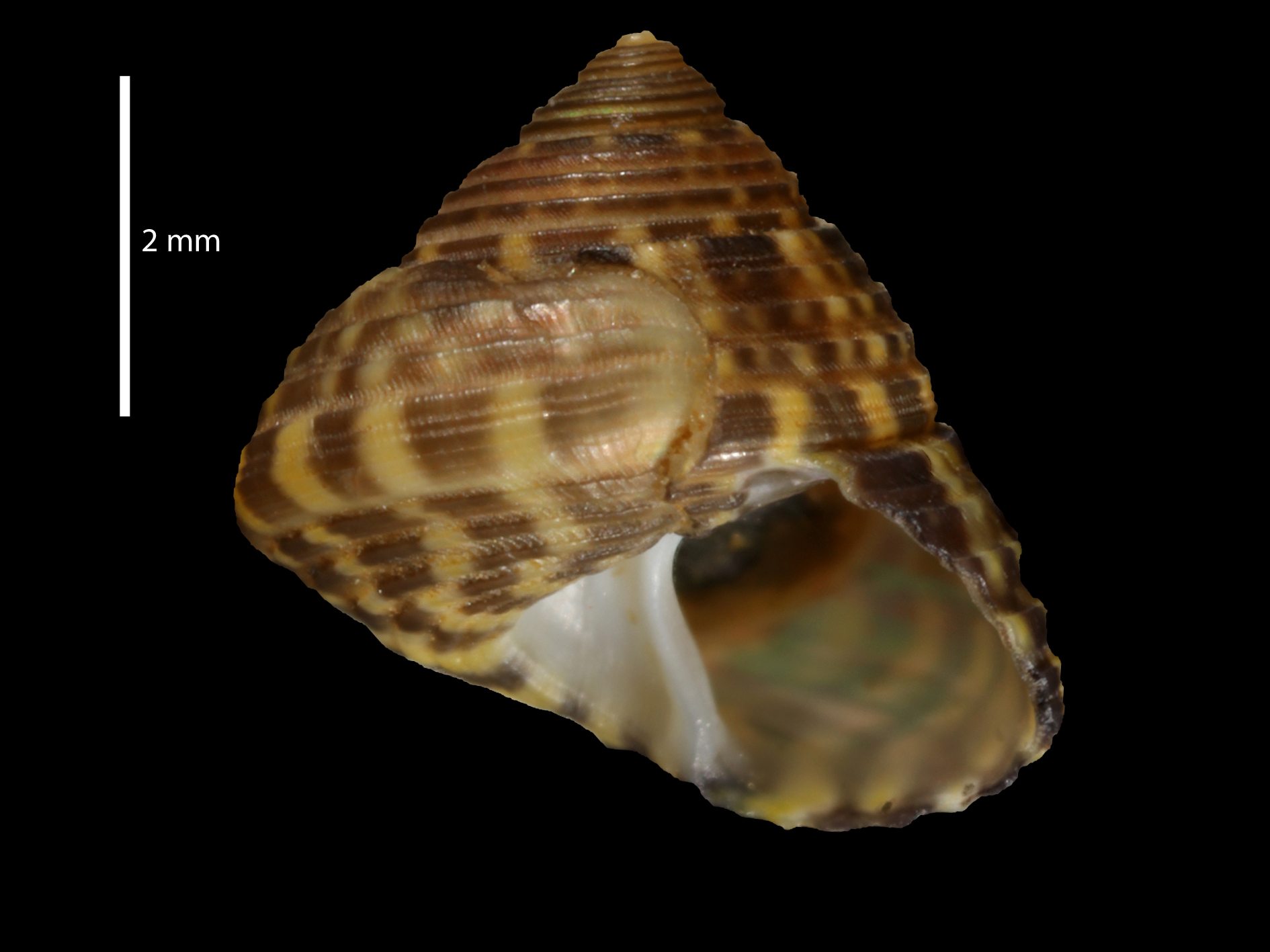
- Shell of Gibbula denizi (paratype at MNHN, Paris)

Scientific classification
- Kingdom: Animalia
- Phylum: Mollusca
- Class: Gastropoda
- Subclass: Vetigastropoda
- Order: Trochida
- Superfamily: Trochoidea
- Family: Trochidae
- Genus: Gibbula
- Species: G. denizi

Binomial name
- Gibbula denizi Rolán & Swinnen, 2013

= Gibbula denizi =

Species of gastropod

Gibbula denizi is a species of sea snail, a marine gastropod mollusk in the family Trochidae, the top snails.

== Description ==
The length of the shell attains 3 mm. The shape of the shell is typically small and conical.

== Distribution ==
This species occurs in the Atlantic Ocean, specifically off the coast of Angola.
