= Gibbula buchi =

Scientific classification
- Kingdom: Animalia
- Phylum: Mollusca
- Class: Gastropoda
- Subclass: Vetigastropoda
- Order: Trochida
- Superfamily: Trochoidea
- Family: Trochidae
- Genus: Gibbula
- Species: G. buchi

Binomial name
- Gibbula buchi (Dubois, 1831)

Synonyms
- Gibbula (Gibbula) buchi Baluk, 1975; Trochus buchi Dubois, 1831 (original description)

Species of gastropod

Gibbula buchi is a species of sea snail, a marine gastropod mollusk in the family Trochidae, the top snails.

It is only known as a fossil from the Late Middle Miocene of Austria (the Sarmatian Craton of the Paratethys) in the age range between 13.65 Ma and 11.608 Ma.

It was an epifaunal grazer in the offshore zone.

A study of M. Harzhauser and T. Kowalke (2002) has put this species in the genus Gibbula.
