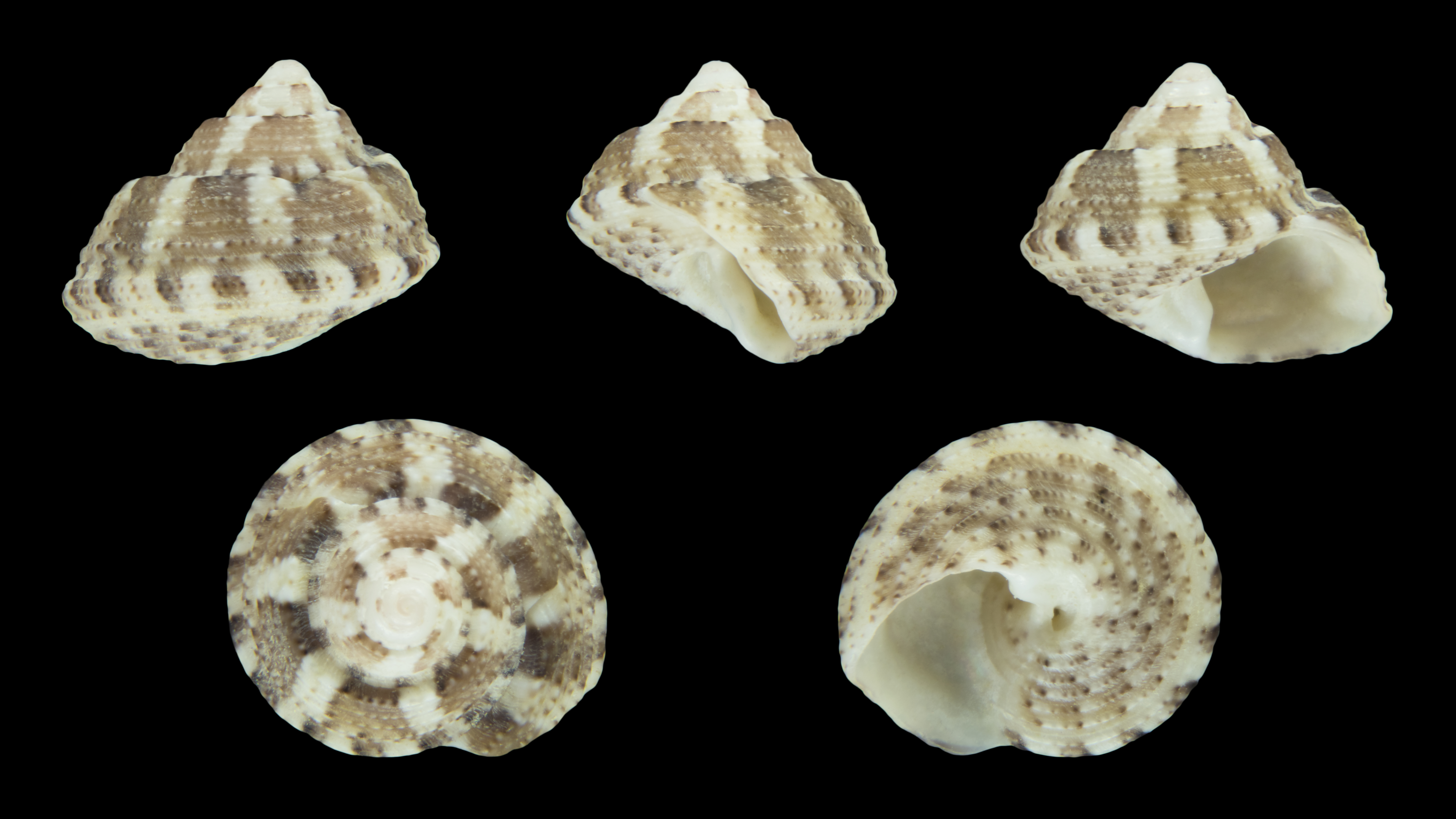
- A shells of Gibbula ardens

Scientific classification
- Kingdom: Animalia
- Phylum: Mollusca
- Class: Gastropoda
- Subclass: Vetigastropoda
- Order: Trochida
- Superfamily: Trochoidea
- Family: Trochidae
- Genus: Gibbula
- Species: G. ardens

Binomial name
- Gibbula ardens (Salis-Marschlins C. U. von, 1793)

Synonyms
- Gibbula apicalis Nordsieck 1972; Gibbula ardens var. cinerea Monterosato 1888; Gibbula ardens var. clausa Monterosato 1888; Gibbula ardens var. cupa Monterosato 1888; Gibbula ardens var. fusca Monterosato 1888; Gibbula ardens var. globosa Monterosato 1888; Gibbula ardens var. grisea Monterosato 1888; Gibbula ardens var. maculata Monterosato 1888; Gibbula ardens var. minor-elevata Pallary 1938; Gibbula ardens var. modesta Pallary 1938; Gibbula barbara Monterosato 1884; Gibbula barbara var. minor-elevata Pallary 1938; Gibbula barbara var. pyramidata Pallary 1906; Gibbula bicolor Risso 1826; Gibbula kalinota Adams A. 1851; Gibbula sanguinea Risso 1826; Gibbula subcincta Monterosato 1888; Gibbula sulcosa Adams A. 1851; Gibbula venusta Adams A. 1851; Trochus adansoni Payraudeau 1826; Trochus ardens Salis Marschlins 1793; Trochus ardens var. ornata Bucquoy, Dautzenberg & Dollfus 1884; Trochus canaliculatus Lamarck 1804; Trochus fermoni Payraudeau 1826; Trochus fermoni var. albina Monterosato 1880; Trochus fermoni var. depressa Issel 1878; Trochus fermoni var. elata Monterosato 1880; Trochus fermoni var. prominula Issel 1878; Trochus fermoni var. purpurea Monterosato 1880; Trochus fermoni var. sulphurea Monterosato 1880; Trochus succinctus Monterosato 1880; Trochus succinctus var. albida Monterosato 1880; Trochus succinctus var. atropurpurea Monterosato 1880; Trochus succinctus var. flavida Monterosato 1880; Trochus tessellatus Philippi

= Gibbula ardens =

Species of gastropod

Gibbula ardens is a species of small sea snail, known as top snails or top shells, marine gastropod molluscs in the family Trochidae, the top snails.

== Description ==
The shell of an adult Gibbula ardens can be as large as 8–16 millimetres (0.31–0.63 in). The solid, umbilicate shell has a depressed conic shape with a variable sculpture. Its color is quite variable, but usually is reddish or olive brown, with a subsutural series of short white flammules, a row of white spots on the periphery, the remainder of the surface sparsely punctate with white. The spire is acute. The sutures are markedly canaliculate. The whorls (about 7) are convex and spirally lirate. Their interstices are obliquely regularly crispate-striate. The 5 or 6 lirae on the penultimate whorl are frequently grooved, and usually with lirulae between them. The base of the shell contains about 8 principal concentric lirae. The oblique aperture is smooth within, but apparently sulcate. The columella is subdentate in the middle. The umbilicus is funnel-shaped and is bordered by a white rib.

== Distribution and habitat ==
This common species occurs in the Mediterranean Sea and the Adriatic Sea in the seagrass prairies of Posidonia oceanica; on the Atlantic coast of Portugal.
