= Gibbula delgadensis =

Scientific classification
- Kingdom: Animalia
- Phylum: Mollusca
- Class: Gastropoda
- Subclass: Vetigastropoda
- Order: Trochida
- Superfamily: Trochoidea
- Family: Trochidae
- Genus: Gibbula
- Species: G. delgadensis

Binomial name
- Gibbula delgadensis Nordsieck, 1982

Species of gastropod

Gibbula delgadensis is a species of sea snail, a marine gastropod mollusk in the family Trochidae, the top snails.

== Description ==
The heightof the shell attains 3 mm.

== Distribution ==
This species occurs in the Atlantic Ocean off the Azores.
