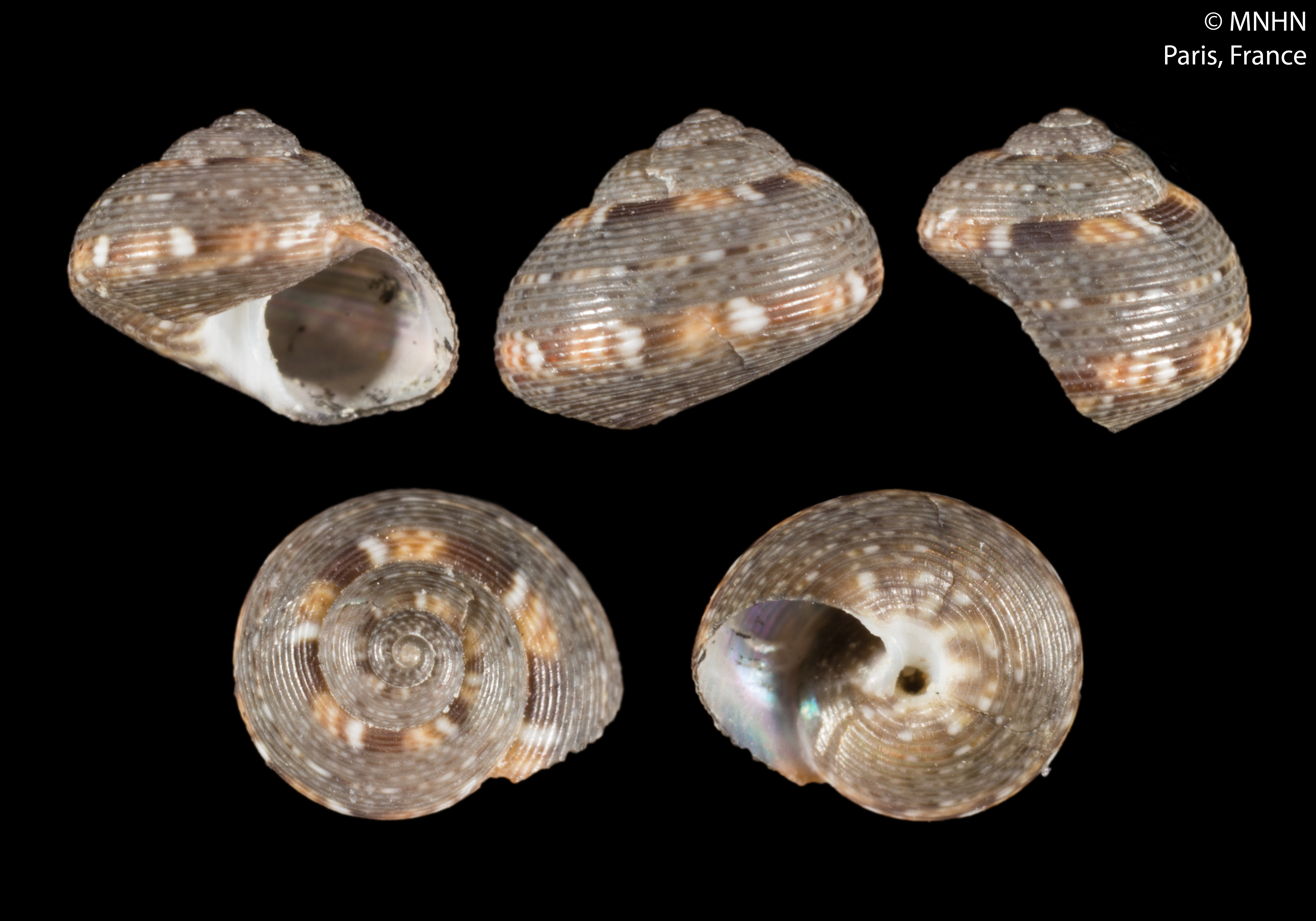
- Shell of Gibbula aurantia (syntype at MNHN, Paris)

Scientific classification
- Kingdom: Animalia
- Phylum: Mollusca
- Class: Gastropoda
- Subclass: Vetigastropoda
- Order: Trochida
- Superfamily: Trochoidea
- Family: Trochidae
- Genus: Gibbula
- Species: G. aurantia

Binomial name
- Gibbula aurantia F. Nordsieck, 1975

= Gibbula aurantia =

Species of gastropod

Gibbula aurantia is a species of sea snail, a marine gastropod mollusk in the family Trochidae, the top snails.

The name was introduced conditionally in Nordsieck & Talavera, 1979, but not available therefrom.

== Distribution ==
This species occurs in the Atlantic Ocean off Lanzarote in the Canary Islands.
