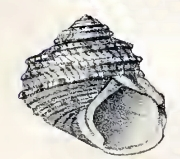
- Drawing of a shell of Gibbula multicolor

Scientific classification
- Kingdom: Animalia
- Phylum: Mollusca
- Class: Gastropoda
- Subclass: Vetigastropoda
- Order: Trochida
- Superfamily: Trochoidea
- Family: Trochidae
- Genus: Gibbula
- Species: G. multicolor

Binomial name
- Gibbula multicolor (Krauss, 1848)

Synonyms
- Cynisca rufanensis Turton, 1932; Gibbula becki Turton, 1932; Gibbula distincta Turton, 1932; Gibbula fucata Gould, 1861; Gibbula fucata var. sowerbyi Turton, 1932; Gibbula hera Turton, 1932 (invalid: junior homonym of Gibbula hera Bartsch, 1915); Gibbula lauta Turton, 1932; Gibbula lauta var. jucunda Turton, 1932; Gibbula lauta var. pretiosa Turton, 1932; Gibbula multicolor f. hera Turton, 1932; Gibbula ornata Turton, 1932; Gibbula polychroma Turton, 1932; Gibbula pulchella Turton, 1932; Stomatella biporcata A. Adams, 1850; Trochus multicolor Krauss, 1848 (original description)

= Gibbula multicolor =

Species of gastropod

Gibbula multicolor, common name the multicoloured topshell, is a species of sea snail, a marine gastropod mollusk in the family Trochidae, the top snails.

== Description ==
The height of the shell attains 6½ mm, its diameter 7 mm. The small, narrowly perforated shell has a conoidal shape with five whorls. The first is whitish-rosy, the following white, with reddish flammules and spots of green and bluish, especially at the ridges. The surface of the whorls is marked with very fine spiral and vertical striae, and 2 elevated carinae. The body whorl contains three keels. The base of the shell is red with a spiral series of green streaks, concentrically striate. The aperture is suboval and smooth within. The columella is white.

(Description of Gibbula fucata) The height of the shell attains 5.6 mm, its diameter 7.3 mm. The elevated shell has a helicoid shape. Its apex is red, the rest variously spotted, streaked and blotched with Indian red, pale yellow, light green and brown. The 2½ nuclear whorls are well rounded and smooth. The postnuclear whorls are marked by four, very strong, rounded, equal, and equally spaced, spiral cords, of which the first is at the summit and the fourth at the periphery. On the last turn the cord at the summit becomes obsolete. In addition to the spiral sculpture the whorls are marked by very retractively slanting, closely spaced lines of growth. The periphery of the body whorl is rendered decidedly angulated by the spiral cord. The base of the shell is short, well rounded, marked on the posterior fourth by six, narrow, flattened, spiral bands and between these and the umbilical chink by seven additional bands of about double the width of the former. The umbilicus is covered with a white callus. The aperture is subcircular and very oblique. The outer lip is thin at the edge and thick within. The columella is strong and decidedly curved. The parietal wall is covered by a moderately thick callus.

(Description as Stomatella biporcata) The shell is turbinate and subdepressed. Its color is red and white, obscurely variegated. It is transversely sulcate. The acuminate spire contains four whorls, the last with two prominent ridges. The subquadrate aperture is pearly within. The inner lip is nearly straight. The outer lip is bi-angulate in the middle. The umbilicus is covered by a callus.

This is a small red species, with two rounded ridges on the body whorl and with a subquadrate aperture.

== Distribution ==
This marine species occurs off the southern coast of South Africa and off Australia.
