= Gibbula verdensis =

Scientific classification
- Kingdom: Animalia
- Phylum: Mollusca
- Class: Gastropoda
- Subclass: Vetigastropoda
- Order: Trochida
- Superfamily: Trochoidea
- Family: Trochidae
- Genus: Gibbula
- Species: G. verdensis

Binomial name
- Gibbula verdensis Rolán & Templado, 2001

Species of gastropod

Gibbula verdensis is a species of sea snail, a marine gastropod mollusk in the family Trochidae, the top snails.

== Description ==
The Gibbula verdensis is a living organism, of the Animalia Kingdom. It belongs to the phylum Mollusca, class Gastropoda, subclass Vetigastropoda, order Trochida, family Trochidae, subfamily Cantharidinae and genus Gibbula. Dead Gibbula verdensis form shallow marine sediments. They have sexual reproduction. Their body symmetry is dextrally coiled. The shell reaches a height of 7 mm. Their locomotion relies on mucus mediated gliding, which refers to muscular waves propelling an animal over a mucus layer overlaying the substrate; in which alternating regions of muscular contraction and expansion create traveling waves that shear the mucus, resulting in translation of the animal. The mineralized skeleton of the Gibbula verdensis contains calcium carbonate. Their trophic guild (which is a group of species that exploit the same food resources, and/or use the same feeding or foraging methods) is deposit feeder, which refers to an organism that eats particulate organic material in or on sediments, and grazer, which refers to a consumer feeding on low growing organisms, eg: a herbivore that eats parts of low-growing grasses, forbs or algae.

== Distribution ==
This species occurs in the Atlantic Ocean off the Cape Verdes. Some of the places where it has been spotted are Cabo Verde, Santo Antâo, Tarrafal de Monte Trigo, and weeds on rocks. Their habitat is the marine benthic biome (benthic meaning 'bottom') encompasses the seafloor and includes such areas as shores, littoral or intertidal areas, marine coral reefs, and the deep seabed.
