= Gibbula podolica =

Scientific classification
- Kingdom: Animalia
- Phylum: Mollusca
- Class: Gastropoda
- Subclass: Vetigastropoda
- Order: Trochida
- Superfamily: Trochoidea
- Family: Trochidae
- Genus: Gibbula
- Species: G. podolica

Binomial name
- Gibbula podolica (Dubois, 1831)

Synonyms
- Calliostoma (Sarmates) podolicum (Dubois, 1831); Trochus podolicus Dubois, 1831 (original description)

Species of gastropod

Gibbula podolica is a species of sea snail, a marine gastropod mollusk in the family Trochidae, the top snails.

This species is only known as a fossil from the Middle Miocene of Austria, in the age range between 12.7 Ma and 11.608 Ma. This snail appears to have been an epifaunal grazer in the offshore zone.

A study by M. Harzhauser and T. Kowalke (2002) placed this species in the genus Gibbula.
