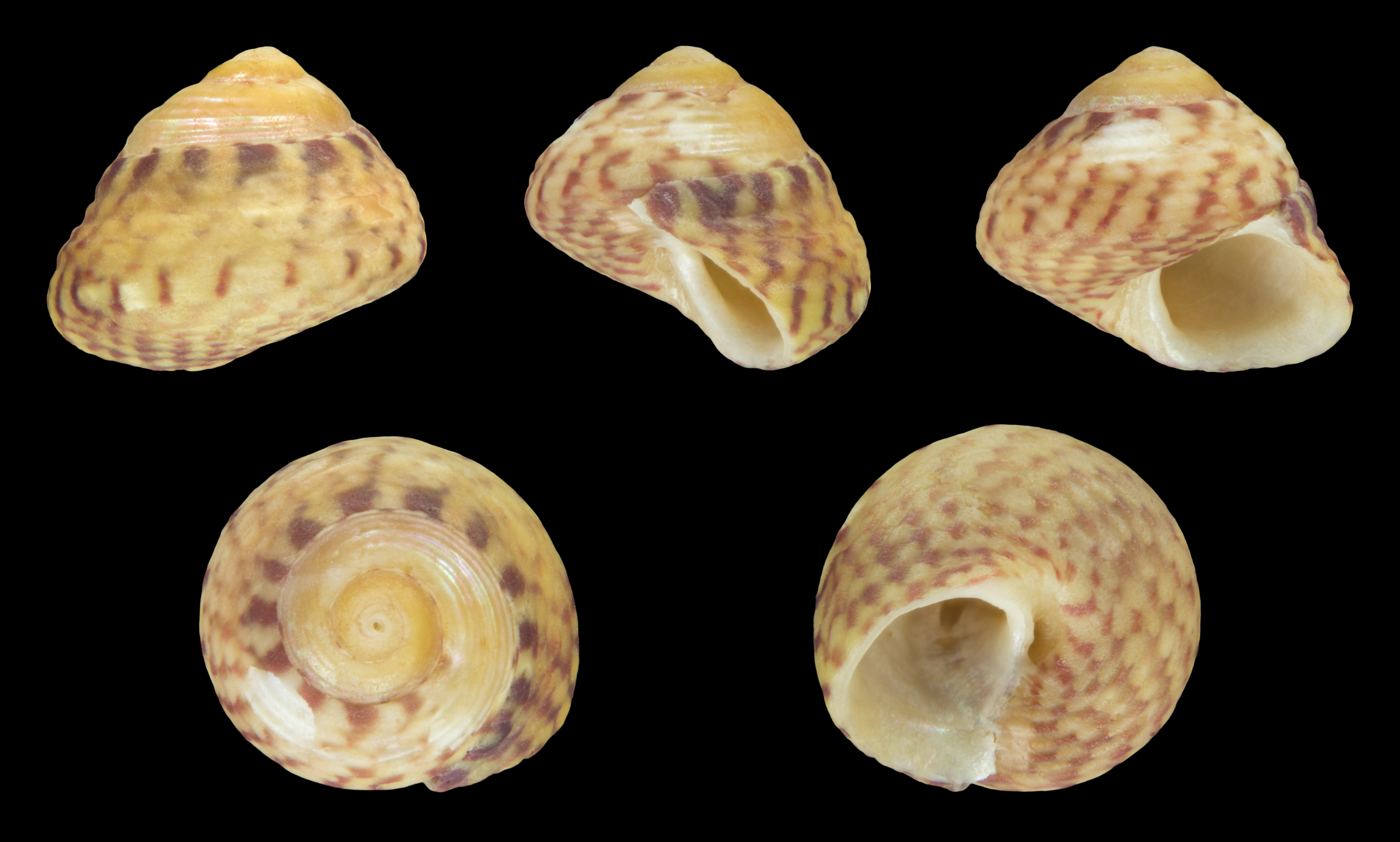
- Gibbula racketti

Scientific classification
- Kingdom: Animalia
- Phylum: Mollusca
- Class: Gastropoda
- Subclass: Vetigastropoda
- Order: Trochida
- Superfamily: Trochoidea
- Family: Trochidae
- Genus: Gibbula
- Species: G. racketti

Binomial name
- Gibbula racketti (Payraudeau, 1826)

Synonyms
- Gibbula gibbosula Brusina, 1865; Gibbula isseli Monterosato, 1888; Gibbula pseudotumida Nordsieck, 1982; Gibbula pygmaea Risso, 1826; Gibbula pygmaea var. aperta Monterosato 1888; Gibbula pygmaea var. depressula Monterosato 1888; Gibbula pygmaea var. imitatrix Monterosato 1888; Gibbula pygmaea var. pervia Monterosato 1888; Gibbula tumida var. racketti (Payraudeau, 1826); Gibbula tumidulina Locard, 1904; Trochus petholatus Dillwynn; Trochus racketti Payraudeau, 1826 (original description); Trochus racketti var. albidoconica Bucquoy, Dautzenberg & Dollfus 1884

= Gibbula racketti =

Species of gastropod

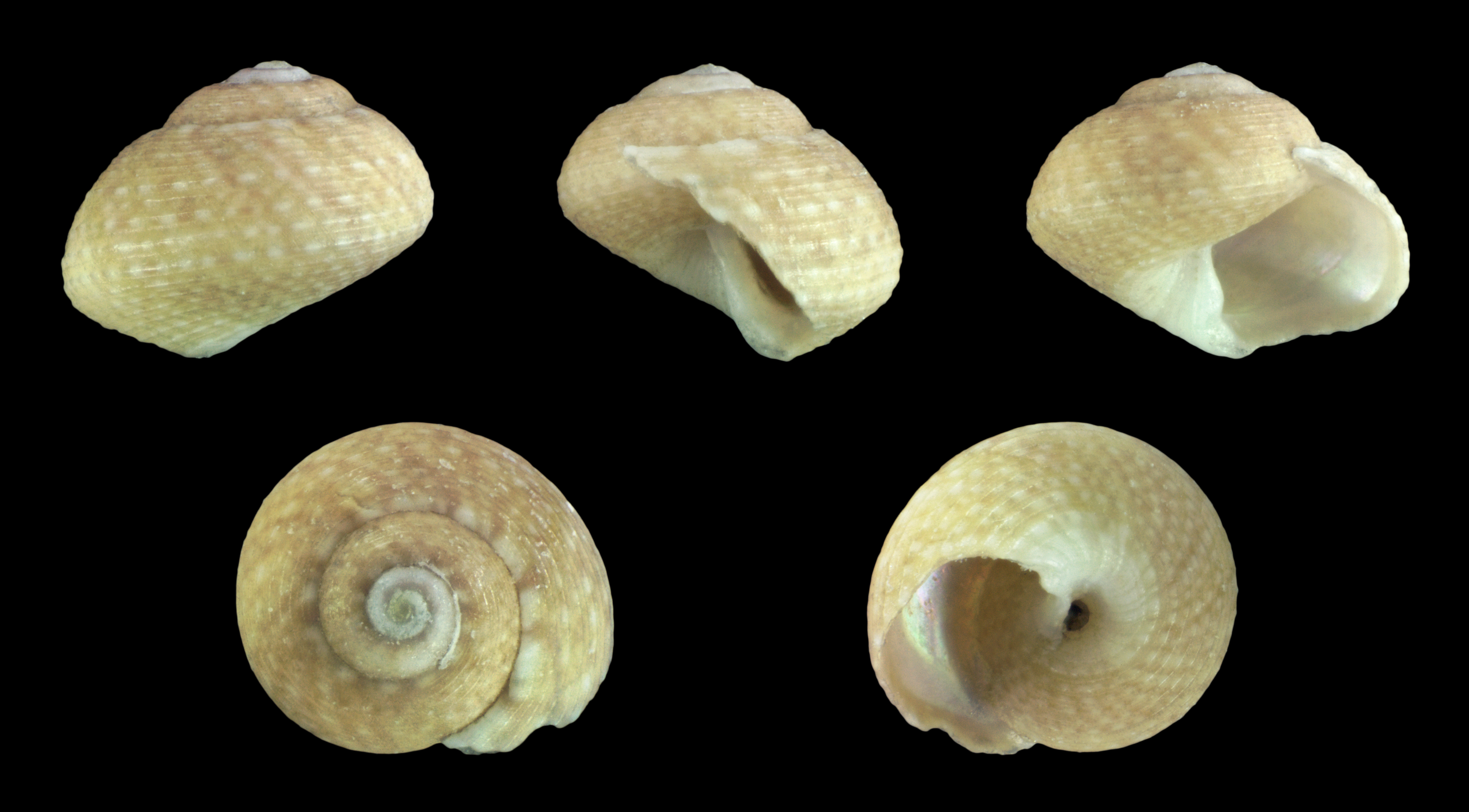
var. pygmaea

Gibbula racketti is a species of sea snail, a marine gastropod mollusk in the family Trochidae, the top snails.

== Description ==
The size of the shell varies between 4 mm and 8 mm. This species form differs from typical Gibbula tumida in the constant smaller size, fewer whorls (4 to 5), and generally more solid and deeply colored shell. It is variable in proportions, frequently as broad or broader than long.

== Distribution ==
This species occurs in the Mediterranean Sea and in the Atlantic Ocean off Portugal.
