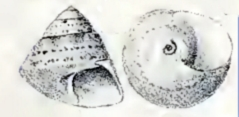
- Drawing with two views of a shell of Gibbula tryoni

Scientific classification
- Kingdom: Animalia
- Phylum: Mollusca
- Class: Gastropoda
- Subclass: Vetigastropoda
- Order: Trochida
- Superfamily: Trochoidea
- Family: Trochidae
- Genus: Gibbula
- Species: G. tryoni

Binomial name
- Gibbula tryoni Pilsbry, 1889

Synonyms
- Gibbula aglaia Bartsch, 1915; Gibbula incinta Sowerby, 1894; Gibbula medusa Bartsch, 1915

= Gibbula tryoni =

Species of gastropod

Gibbula tryoni is a species of sea snail, a marine gastropod mollusk in the family Trochidae, the top snails.

== Description ==
The size of the shell attains 17 mm. The umbilicate, rather thin shell has a conical shape. It is crimson or purplish red, obscurely, rather finely mottled with arrow-shaped whitish dots, usually with several narrow articulated lines on the base, and in the middle of the upper surface of the body whorl. The yellow, apical whorls are eroded. The spire is conic. The five whorls are a little tumid below each suture, and with a narrow ledge or margin, marked off by an impressed line, above each suture. This peripheral ledge gives the body whorl a rather prominent keel. The surface is polished, but shows quite prominent, spaced, impressed growth lines, and under a lens is all over very densely minutely spirally striate. The base of the shell is flattened, rather prominent around the umbilicus. The oblique aperture is quadrangular, smooth and with a very brilliantly iridescent green nacre inside. The columella is arcuate above and expanded partly over the umbilicus. The parietal wall is free from callus. The umbilicus is deep, with a narrow rapidly tapering perforation, but broad and funnel-shaped at the opening.

(Description of Gibbula medusa by Bartsch) The height of the shell attains 3.5 mm, its diameter 5 mm. The shell has a depressed conic shape. The nuclear whorls are white. The postnuclear whorls are marked with broad axial bands of brown which may extend entirely across the whorls, or may be interrupted in the middle. These bands of brown are separated by spaces of a light sage green, which are about as wide as the brown bands on the posterior half of the whorls between the sutures. The green area fading to yellow anteriorly. These light areas are speckled with small dots of chestnut and clouded in places with pale brown. The base of the shell is pale green, profusely spotted with dots and blotches of red. The 2¼ nuclear whorls are depressed helicoid. The postnuclear whorls are evenly rounded, marked with two, broad, spiral bands, which extend over the anterior half of the whorls between the sutures, where they appear as two turns of a bandage. The periphery of the body whorl is marked by a moderately strong spiral keel which renders it angulated. The sutures are feebly constricted. The base of the shell is short, well rounded, and broadly umbilicated. It is marked by seven broad low bands which grow successively wider from the umbilical edge toward the periphery. These bands appear as a series of turns of a bandage. The umbilicus lacks any spiral sculpture. The entire surface of spire and base is marked with faint retractive lines of growth. The oval aperture is very oblique. The outer and basal lips are thin, showing the external markings within. The inner lip is quite thick, evenly curved. The parietal wall is glazed with a very thin callus.

In 1963 K.H. Barnard considered this name a synonym and a juvenile form of Gibbula tryoni Pilsbry, 1889

== Distribution ==
This marine shell occurs off Port Elizabeth and Port Alfred to North KwaZuluNatal, South Africa
