= Gibbula vimontiae =

Scientific classification
- Kingdom: Animalia
- Phylum: Mollusca
- Class: Gastropoda
- Subclass: Vetigastropoda
- Order: Trochida
- Superfamily: Trochoidea
- Family: Trochidae
- Genus: Gibbula
- Species: G. vimontiae

Binomial name
- Gibbula vimontiae Monterosato, 1884

Synonyms
- Gibbula huberi Oberling, 1970

Species of gastropod

Gibbula vimontiae is a species of sea snail, a marine gastropod mollusk in the family Trochidae, the top snails.

== Description ==
The height of the shell attains 3 mm.

== Distribution ==
This species occurs in the Mediterranean Sea.
