= Gibbula deversa =

Scientific classification
- Kingdom: Animalia
- Phylum: Mollusca
- Class: Gastropoda
- Subclass: Vetigastropoda
- Order: Trochida
- Superfamily: Trochoidea
- Family: Trochidae
- Genus: Gibbula
- Species: G. deversa

Binomial name
- Gibbula deversa Milaschewitsch, 1916

Species of gastropod

Gibbula deversa is a species of sea snail, a marine gastropod mollusk in the family Trochidae, the top snails.

== Distribution ==
This species occurs in the Northern Atlantic Ocean.
