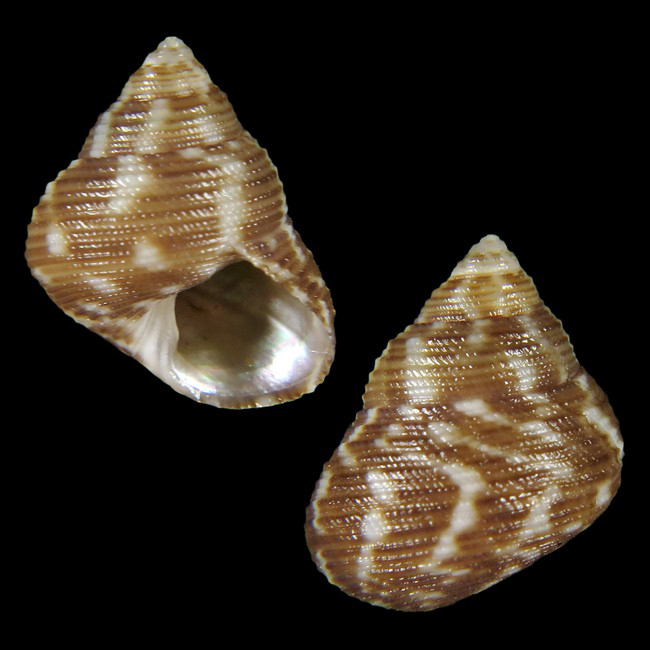

Scientific classification
- Kingdom: Animalia
- Phylum: Mollusca
- Class: Gastropoda
- Subclass: Vetigastropoda
- Order: Trochida
- Superfamily: Trochoidea
- Family: Trochidae
- Genus: Gibbula
- Species: G. eikoae

Binomial name
- Gibbula eikoae Poppe, Tagaro & Dekker, 2006

= Gibbula eikoae =

Species of gastropod

Gibbula eikoae is a species of sea snail, a marine gastropod mollusk in the family Trochidae, the top snails.

== Description ==
The size of the shell varies between 5 mm and 15 mm.

== Distribution ==
This marine shell occurs off the Philippines and in the East China Sea.
