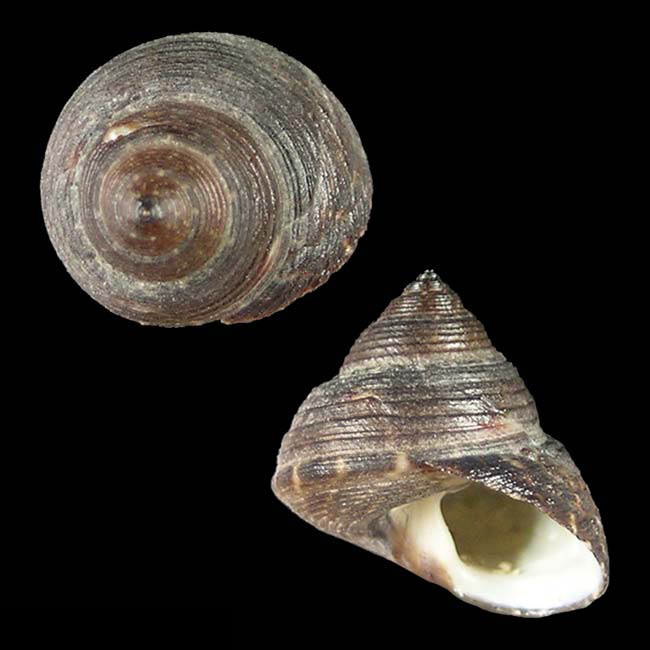

Scientific classification
- Kingdom: Animalia
- Phylum: Mollusca
- Class: Gastropoda
- Subclass: Vetigastropoda
- Order: Trochida
- Superfamily: Trochoidea
- Family: Trochidae
- Genus: Gibbula
- Species: G. houarti

Binomial name
- Gibbula houarti Poppe, Tagaro & Dekker, 2006

= Gibbula houarti =

Species of gastropod

Gibbula houarti is a species of sea snail, a marine gastropod mollusk in the family Trochidae, the top snails.

== Description ==
The size of the shell varies between 6 mm and 13 mm.

The attributes of Gibbula houarti include, a benthos functional group, a deposit feeder and grazer feeding type.

== Distribution ==
This marine species occurs off the Philippines.
