= Gibbula guishanensis =

Scientific classification
- Kingdom: Animalia
- Phylum: Mollusca
- Class: Gastropoda
- Subclass: Vetigastropoda
- Order: Trochida
- Superfamily: Trochoidea
- Family: Trochidae
- Genus: Gibbula
- Species: G. guishanensis

Binomial name
- Gibbula guishanensis Wen-Der Chen & I-Feng Fu, 2008

Species of gastropod

Gibbula guishanensis is a species of sea snail, a marine gastropod mollusk in the family Trochidae, the top snails.

== Distribution ==
This marine species occurs off Taiwan.
