= Gibbula sementis =

Scientific classification
- Kingdom: Animalia
- Phylum: Mollusca
- Class: Gastropoda
- Subclass: Vetigastropoda
- Order: Trochida
- Superfamily: Trochoidea
- Family: Trochidae
- Genus: Gibbula
- Species: G. sementis

Binomial name
- Gibbula sementis Rolán & Templado, 2001

Species of gastropod

Gibbula sementis is a species of sea snail, a marine gastropod mollusk in the family Trochidae, the top snails.

== Description ==
The height of the shell attains 6.1 mm.

== Distribution ==
This species occurs in the Atlantic Ocean off the islands of Santiago and Brava, Cape Verde.
