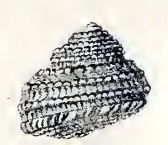
- Drawing with an abapertural view of a shell of Gibbula guttadauri

Scientific classification
- Kingdom: Animalia
- Phylum: Mollusca
- Class: Gastropoda
- Subclass: Vetigastropoda
- Order: Trochida
- Superfamily: Trochoidea
- Family: Trochidae
- Genus: Gibbula
- Species: G. guttadauri

Binomial name
- Gibbula guttadauri (Philippi, 1836)

Synonyms
- Trochus guttadauri Philippi 1836

= Gibbula guttadauri =

Species of gastropod

Gibbula guttadauri is a species of sea snail, a marine gastropod mollusk in the family Trochidae, the top snails.

== Description ==
The size of the shell varies between 4 mm and 11 mm. The small, umbilicate shell has a conical shape. It is whitish, irregularly maculated with reddish brown or purplish above, dotted beneath. The six whorls are turreted and very convex. The apex is acute. The body whorl is encircled by three strong ribs, one on the periphery, the others above it. The interstices are lamellose-striate. They are plicate or lamellose-striate below the sutures. The base of the shell contains 6 or 7 concentric lirae. The columella is nearly straight, arcuate above and terminates in a tubercle below. The umbilicus is narrow.

== Distribution ==
This species occurs in the Mediterranean Sea (Sicily) and in the Adriatic Sea (Dalmatian coast)
