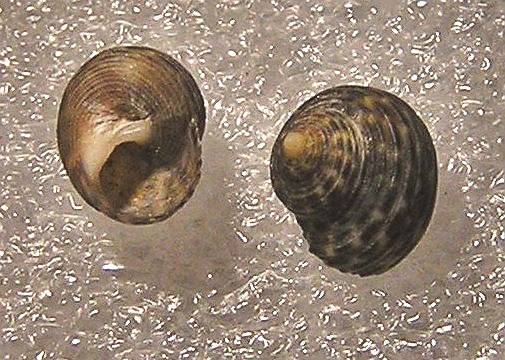
- Gibbula cicer

Scientific classification
- Kingdom: Animalia
- Phylum: Mollusca
- Class: Gastropoda
- Subclass: Vetigastropoda
- Order: Trochida
- Superfamily: Trochoidea
- Family: Trochidae
- Genus: Gibbula
- Species: G. cicer

Binomial name
- Gibbula cicer (Menke, 1844)

Synonyms
- Gibbula approximata Turton, 1932; Gibbula cicer f. thalia Bartsch, 1915; Gibbula fulgens Gould, 1861; Gibbula gaudiosa Gould, 1861; Gibbula globulosa Turton, 1932; Gibbula (Gibbula) cicer Menke, 1844; Gibbula musiva Gould, 1861; Gibbula thalia Bartsch, 1915; Trochus cicer Menke, 1844; Trochus zeyheri Krauss, 1852

= Gibbula cicer =

Species of gastropod

Gibbula cicer is a species of sea snail, a marine gastropod mollusk in the family Trochidae, the top snails.

== Description ==
The size of an adult shell varies between 5 mm and 8 mm. The solid, globose-conical shell is perforate or subperforate. It is longitudinally crossed by reddish or dark brown stripes, often broken into tessellations on the base. There are five, convex whorls. The first two are yellow or rosy and smooth. The rest are coarsely spirally lirate with 6 or 7 lirae on the penultimate whorl. The lirae are separated by deep interstices which sometimes intersect the colored stripes. The spire is short. The body whorl is rounded. The base of the shell is convex and finely marked with about eight narrow lirae with its base frequently suffused with pink. The arcuate columella is straightened in the middle and oblique and very subdentate below. The white or yellowish umbilical area is small.

(Description of Gibbula gaudiosa) The height of the shell attains 5.6 mm, its diameter 5.7 mm. The moderately elevated shell has a helicoid shape. It is red, with four regularly spaced triangular sectors of greenish yellow, on the last turn and one on the whorl preceding this. The cords of the early turns are of the most intense red, equaling the base in the brilliancy of this color. The 1½ nuclear whorls arewhite. The four postnuclear whorls are well rounded, the first and second marked by four equal, and equally spaced, strong, spiral keels. On the third, a fine, intercalated thread occurs between the strong cords, while on the last turn the number of fine spiral threads between the strong cords is doubled. In addition to the above sculpture, the spire is marked by rather strong, closely spaced, retractive incremental lines. The sutures are strongly impressed. The periphery of the body whorl is rendered strongly angulated by the fourth strong spiral cord. The base of the shell is short, well rounded, and marked by 15 almost equal and equally spaced, well-rounded, spiral cords. The oblique aperture is subcircular. The outer lip is thin at the edge where it is rendered sinuous by the strong spiral cords. The columella is moderately stout and well curved. The parietal wall is covered with a thin callus.

== Distribution ==
This marine species occurs off Namibia and North Transkei (South Africa)
