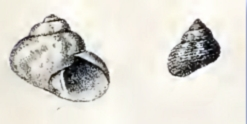
- Drawing with two views of a shell of Gibbula turbinoides

Scientific classification
- Kingdom: Animalia
- Phylum: Mollusca
- Class: Gastropoda
- Subclass: Vetigastropoda
- Order: Trochida
- Superfamily: Trochoidea
- Family: Trochidae
- Genus: Gibbula
- Species: G. turbinoides

Binomial name
- Gibbula turbinoides (Deshayes, 1835)

Synonyms
- Gibbula purpurea var. normalis Monterosato 1888; Gibbula purpurea var. seriata Monterosato 1888; Trochus adansoni var. helicoides Philippi 1844; Trochus adansoni var. lutea Dautzenberg 1883; Trochus turbinoides Deshayes, 1835 (original description); Trochus turbinoides var. albida Dautzenberg 1883; Trochus turbinoides var. atra Bucquoy, Dautzenberg & Dollfus 1884; Trochus turbinoides var. cincta Dautzenberg 1883; Trochus turbinoides var. rosea Bucquoy, Dautzenberg & Dollfus 1884; Trochus turbinoides var. rubra Bucquoy, Dautzenberg & Dollfus 1884; Trochus turbinoides var. unicolor Bucquoy, Dautzenberg & Dollfus 1884; Trochus turbinoides var. virescens Bucquoy, Dautzenberg & Dollfus 1884

= Gibbula turbinoides =

Species of gastropod

Gibbula turbinoides is a species of sea snail, a marine gastropod mollusk in the family Trochidae, the top snails.

== Description ==
The size of the shell varies between 4 mm and 10 mm. The globose shell was previously thought to be a smaller variety of Gibbula adansonii. It is rose-red, yellowish, or brown, with short white flammules below the sutures. The remainder of the shell minutely punctate with white.

== Distribution ==
This species occurs in the Mediterranean Sea and in the Atlantic Ocean off Portugal.
