= Gibbula beckeri =

Scientific classification
- Kingdom: Animalia
- Phylum: Mollusca
- Class: Gastropoda
- Subclass: Vetigastropoda
- Order: Trochida
- Superfamily: Trochoidea
- Family: Trochidae
- Genus: Gibbula
- Species: G. beckeri

Binomial name
- Gibbula beckeri G.B. Sowerby III, 1901

Species of gastropod

Gibbula beckeri is a species of sea snail, a marine gastropod mollusk in the family Trochidae, the top snails.

== Description ==
The size of the shell attains 8 mm (0.31 in). The shell consists of the protoconch nucleus plus 4 whorls. The profile is rather strongly convex in the upper half of the whorl. There are spiral lirae 2 on 2nd and 3rd whorls, 3 on 4th whorl. These are broad and low, scarcely projecting above the profile, defined by impressed striae, the 3rd being peripheral and feebly carinate; an additional stria (or 2) between 1st and 2nd lirae, and 2-3 between 2nd and 3rd. Sometimes (as in a cotype) only 1 (midwhorl) lira on 2nd and 3rd whorls, but the peripheral one comes into view on 4th whorl. On the base of the shell there is usually a marginal lira and 7-8 weaker lirae, variable. The umbilicus is not completely closed in the largest shells. The growth lines are distinct.

The colour of the shell is grey or violaceous-grey with white or pale spots, radiating streaks, and/or zigzag marks. Very young shells (up to 2–3 mm (0.079–0.118 in) diameter) are uniformly violaceous. One specimen is yellowish with darker brown radiating patches forming a band below the suture, similar dark patches on the peripheral lira, between these two bands brown zigzags. Two specimens have red-brown radiating streaks on an emerald-green ground colour on 3rd and 4th whorls, streaks extending on to peripheral lira (cf. capensis). The base of the shell contains grey lirae, or is faintly streaked and spotted.

== Distribution ==
This species occurs in the Atlantic Ocean from Namibia to Port Alfred, South Africa
