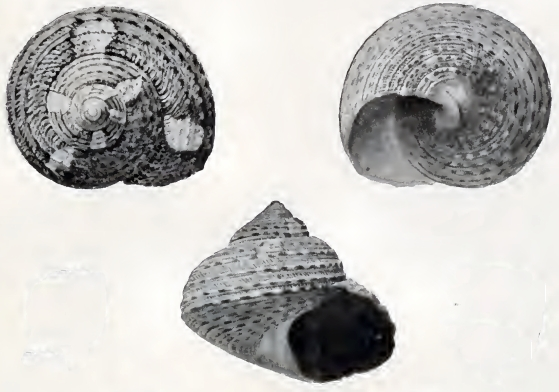
- Three views of a shell of Gibbula loculosa

Scientific classification
- Kingdom: Animalia
- Phylum: Mollusca
- Class: Gastropoda
- Subclass: Vetigastropoda
- Order: Trochida
- Superfamily: Trochoidea
- Family: Trochidae
- Genus: Gibbula
- Species: G. loculosa

Binomial name
- Gibbula loculosa Gould, 1861

= Gibbula loculosa =

Species of gastropod

Gibbula loculosa is a species of sea snail, a marine gastropod mollusk in the family Trochidae, the top snails.

== Description ==
The size of the shell varies between 6 mm and 10 mm. The shell has a depressed globoso-conocal shape. It is light brown, with three large white spots between the suture and the periphery of each whorl, dividing the whorl into equal areas. There are also small spots darker than the general coloration which are especially apparent on the strong spiral cords which they divide into equal alternating light and dark areas. These small markings give the base a checker-board appearance. The nuclear whorls are small, well rounded, the first smooth, the second provided with four feeble spiral threads. The postnuclear whorls are marked by strong sublamellar spiral keels, of which four occur upon the first, and five upon the second. On the next turn an intercalated cord occurs between all the strong keels excepting the space between the third and fourth which has two. On the last turn two cords occur between the first and second keels, one between the second and third, three between the third and fourth and fourth and fifth. In addition to the spiral sculpture the whorls are marked on the spire by numerous closely spaced, decidedly retractively slanting, thin, lamellar, axial riblets. The suture is strongly impressed. The periphery is rendered strongly angulated by a spiral keel, between which and the first supraperipheral keel two slender cords are presented. The base of the shell is well rounded, narrowly umbilicated, and marked by a series of more or less regularly alternating strong and less strong spiral cords of which there are twenty-six in all. The aperture is subcircular. The outer lip is thin, showing the external sculpture within, somewhat wavy at the edge. The columella is short, stout and strongly curved. The parietal wall is covered with a thin callus.

== Distribution ==
This marine species occurs off False Bay to Eastern Cape, South Africa
