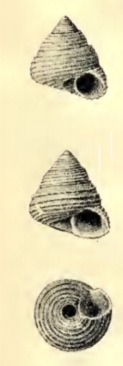
- Original drawing with three views of a shell of Gibbula joubini

Scientific classification
- Kingdom: Animalia
- Phylum: Mollusca
- Class: Gastropoda
- Subclass: Vetigastropoda
- Order: Trochida
- Superfamily: Trochoidea
- Family: Trochidae
- Genus: Gibbula
- Species: G. joubini

Binomial name
- Gibbula joubini Dautzenberg, 1910

= Gibbula joubini =

Species of gastropod

Gibbula joubini is a species of sea snail, a marine gastropod mollusk in the family Trochidae, the top snails.

== Description ==
The size of the shell varies between 2 mm and 5 mm. The rather solid shell has a trochiform shape. It is somewhat, but rather deeply, umbilicated. The conoid spire consists of 6½ somewhat convex whorls with a very pronounced suture. The first two whorls are smooth, the other contain decurrent striae, that are rather sharp and projecting. The growth lines are very narrow and only visible under a lens. The body whorl is bluntly angular at the periphery and almost flat below. The base of the shell contains 5 to 7 concentric ribs. The aperture is subquadrangular. The columella is almost vertical and is slightly curved upwards, forming almost a right angle with the rim of the base. The lip is simple and curved. The color of the shell is very variable. The main color is whitish with narrow, decurrent, sometimes interrupted black lines. The surface sometimes contains large, longitudinal, brown flames, curved to the right.

== Distribution ==
This species occurs in the Atlantic Ocean off the Western Sahara and Senegal.
