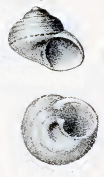
- Drawing with two views of a shell of Lirularia lirulata

Scientific classification
- Kingdom: Animalia
- Phylum: Mollusca
- Class: Gastropoda
- Subclass: Vetigastropoda
- Order: Trochida
- Superfamily: Trochoidea
- Family: Trochidae
- Genus: Lirularia
- Species: L. lirulata

Binomial name
- Lirularia lirulata (Carpenter, 1864)

Synonyms
- Gibbula funiculata Carpenter, 1864; Gibbula lacunata Carpenter, 1864; Gibbula optabilis Carpenter, 1864; Gibbula parcipicta Carpenter, 1864; Margarita acuticostata Carpenter, 1864; Margarita lirulata Carpenter, 1864 (original description)

= Lirularia lirulata =

Species of gastropod

Lirularia lirulata, common name the pearly top shell, is a species of sea snail, a marine gastropod mollusk in the family Trochidae, the top snails.

== Description ==
The height of the shell attains 6 mm. The solid, umbilicate shell has a globose-conical shape. It is lusterless or slightly shining, purplish, unicolored, or with large radiating white patches above, or around the periphery, or spiral darker lines, or spiral articulated lines. Surface either with (1st) a few (2-4) strong lirae above, their interspaces smooth, the base with about 8 concentric lirulae, or (2d) more numerous narrow irregular lirulae above, those of the base still smaller, or (3d) the spiral sculpture obsolete, surface smooth or nearly so above and beneath. The spire is more or less elevated. The apex is obtuse. The sutures are impressed, sometimes subcanaliculate. The body whorl is convex beneath. The aperture is oblique, oval-rhomboidal, very brilliantly iridescent within, but the acute peristome has a rather broad marginal band of opaque white. The columella is simple. The umbilicus is tubular, with incremental striae within.

== Distribution ==
This species occurs in the Pacific Ocean from Sitka, Alaska, to San Diego, California.
