= Gibbula senegalensis =

Scientific classification
- Kingdom: Animalia
- Phylum: Mollusca
- Class: Gastropoda
- Subclass: Vetigastropoda
- Order: Trochida
- Superfamily: Trochoidea
- Family: Trochidae
- Genus: Gibbula
- Species: G. senegalensis

Binomial name
- Gibbula senegalensis Menke, 1853

Synonyms
- Gibbula nassauiensis "Chemnitz, J.H." Stearns, R.E.C., 1893

Species of gastropod

Gibbula senegalensis is a species of sea snail, a marine gastropod mollusk in the family Trochidae, the top snails.

== Description ==
The size of the shell varies between 2 and 5.5 mm (0.079 and 0.217 in).

== Distribution ==
This species occurs in the Atlantic Ocean off the Cape Verdes and is widespread off West Africa.
