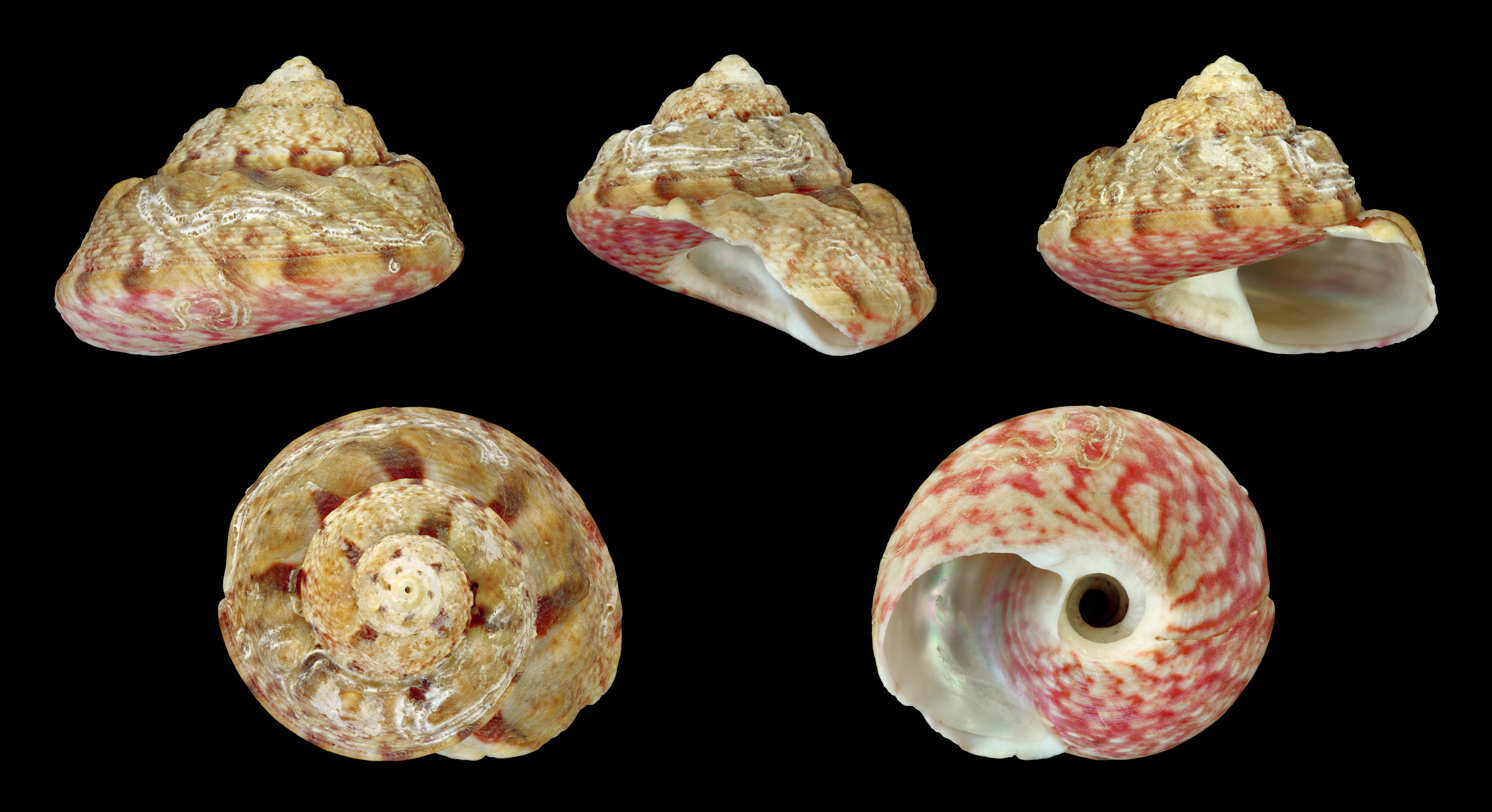
- Gibbula magus

Scientific classification
- Kingdom: Animalia
- Phylum: Mollusca
- Class: Gastropoda
- Subclass: Vetigastropoda
- Order: Trochida
- Superfamily: Trochoidea
- Family: Trochidae
- Genus: Gibbula
- Species: G. magus

Binomial name
- Gibbula magus (Linnaeus, 1758)

Synonyms
- Gibbula bellinii Coen 1930; Gibbula forskadauri Nordsieck 1982; Gibbula magus var. turbinosa Monterosato 1890; Gibbula protumida Locard 1886; Gibbula vulcanica Coen 1930; Trochus bicarinatus Gray J.E. 1834; Trochus grayanus Philippi 1846; Trochus magus Linnaeus, 1758 (original combination); Trochus magus var. alba Jeffreys 1865; Trochus magus var. dilatata Chiamenti 1900; Trochus magus var. elata Danilo & Sandri 1856; Trochus magus var. obsoleta Bucquoy, Dautzenberg & Dollfus 1884; Trochus magus var. producta Bucquoy, Dautzenberg & Dollfus 1884; Trochus tuberculatus da Costa, 1778

= Gibbula magus =

Species of gastropod

Gibbula magus, common name the great top shell, is a species of small sea snail, a marine gastropod mollusc in the family Trochidae, the top snails.

== Description ==
The size of the shell varies between 17 mm and 35 mm. This is an abundant species. The solid, widely, deeply umbilicate shell has a low-conical shape. There is great variation in color. It is whitish or yellowish, painted with zigzag radiating stripes, maculations or lines of pink or rich brown, sometimes so broken into minute flecks as to appear minutely mottled all over, or sometimes lacking markings. The base of the shell is radiately zigzag-striped. The apex is acute. The conical spire contains 7 to 8 whorl. These are swollen, gibbous and radiately plicate beneath the sutures, and with a rim or flange at the periphery. The entire surface is spirally finely striate. The base is convex. The aperture is very oblique, rounded-rhomboid, and smooth within. The columella oblique, its edge straight or slightly convex in the middle, at its insertion reflexed slightly over the umbilicus. The umbilicus is bound by a strong spiral rib.

== Distribution ==
This species occurs in the North Sea, the North Atlantic Ocean (Azores, Morocco) and in the Mediterranean Sea.
