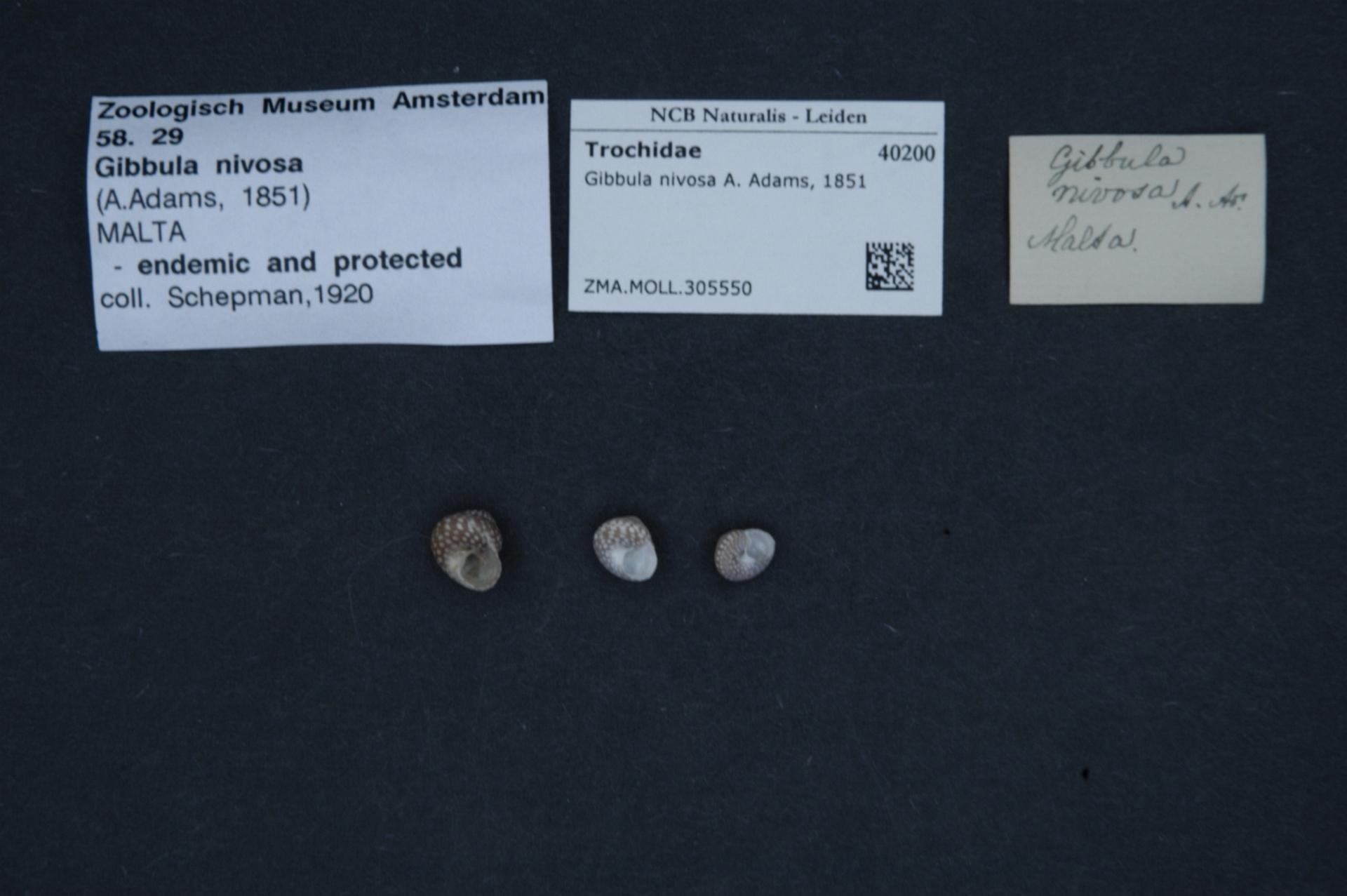
- Steromphala nivosa specimens at the Naturalis Biodiversity Center

Scientific classification
- Kingdom: Animalia
- Phylum: Mollusca
- Class: Gastropoda
- Subclass: Vetigastropoda
- Order: Trochida
- Family: Trochidae
- Subfamily: Cantharidinae
- Genus: Steromphala
- Species: S. nivosa

Binomial name
- Steromphala nivosa (A. Adams, 1851)

Synonyms
- Gibbula altimirai Nordsieck 1982; Gibbula nivosa A. Adams, 1853; Gibbula rotella Monterosato 1888; Trochus pictus Philippi 1846

= Steromphala nivosa =

Species of gastropod

Steromphala nivosa, common name the Maltese top shell, is a species of sea snail, a marine gastropod mollusk in the family Trochidae, the top snails.

== Description ==
The size of the shell varies between 6 mm and 9 mm. The umbilicate shell has an orbiculate-conoidal shape. It is gray with almost round spots. It is sulcate in a crosswise direction and longitudinally substriate. The aperture is almost round. The columella is flexuous. The base of the shell is rounded.

== Distribution ==
This species occurs in the Mediterranean Sea off Malta.
