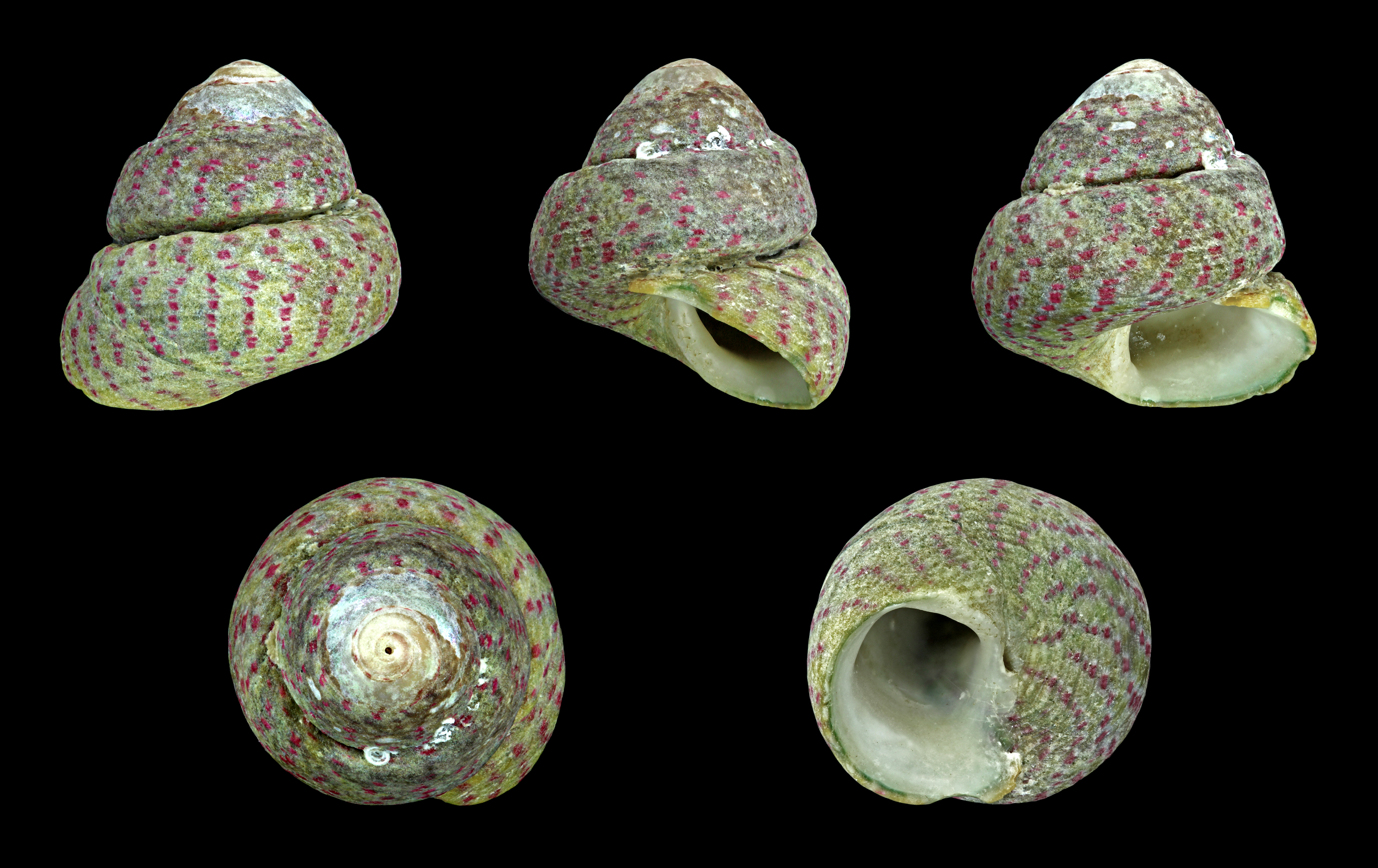
- Shell of Steromphala divaricata

Scientific classification
- Kingdom: Animalia
- Phylum: Mollusca
- Class: Gastropoda
- Subclass: Vetigastropoda
- Order: Trochida
- Superfamily: Trochoidea
- Family: Trochidae
- Subfamily: Cantharidinae
- Genus: Steromphala
- Species: S. divaricata

Binomial name
- Steromphala divaricata (Linnaeus, 1758)

Synonyms
- Gibbula divaricata (Linnaeus, 1758); Gibbula divaricata var. diversa Monterosato 1888; Gibbula divaricata var. regularis Monterosato 1889; Gibbula divaricata var. scalaris Coen 1937; Gibbula specialis Coen 1937; Mondonta lessoni Payraudeau, 1826; Steromphala divaricata (Linnaeus, 1758); Trochus barbierii Brusina 1866; Trochus danili Brusina 1866; Trochus divaricatus Linnaeus, 1758 (basionym); Trochus lineolatus O. G. Costa, 1830 (invalid: junior homonym of Trochus lineolatus Risso, 1826); Trochus marginatus Brusina 1866; Trochus varians O. G. Costa, 1830

= Steromphala divaricata =

Species of gastropod

Steromphala divaricata, common name the divaricate gibbula, is a species of small sea snail, known as top snails or top shells, marine gastropod molluscs in the family Trochidae, the top snails.

== Distribution ==
It is found in the Mediterranean Sea, the Adriatic Sea and the Black Sea.

== Description ==
The length of the shell is between 12 mm and 24 mm and is 16 mm to 19 mm wide. The conoidal shell is imperforate or narrowly perforate. It is very thick and solid, cinereous. The color of the shell is yellowish or green. It is longitudinally marked with rose-red lines, often oblique or broken into square dots. The spire is more or less elevated. Its outlines are rather convex. The six whorls are encircled by numerous lirulae, the upper ones flattened. The sutures are slightly impressed, but scalariform specimens with deep sutures are frequent. The body whorl is rounded at the periphery and on the base. The aperture is rounded-quadrate. The outer lip is bevelled to an edge, very thick and smooth within. The pearly columella is straightened in the middle. The umbilicus is narrow or concealed.
