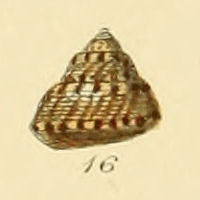

Scientific classification
- Kingdom: Animalia
- Phylum: Mollusca
- Class: Gastropoda
- Subclass: Vetigastropoda
- Order: Trochida
- Superfamily: Trochoidea
- Family: Trochidae
- Genus: Gibbula
- Species: G. tumida

Binomial name
- Gibbula tumida (Montagu, 1803)

Synonyms
- Gibbula tumida lusitanica Nordsieck 1982; Trochus patholatus Dillwyn, 1817; Trochus tumidus Montagu, 1803 (original description)

= Gibbula tumida =

Species of gastropod

Gibbula tumida is a species of sea snail, a marine gastropod mollusk in the family Trochidae, the top snails.

== Description ==
The shell size ranges from 4 to 10 mm. The small, narrowly umbilicate shell features an elevated conical shape. Its color is whitish, with varying patterns of brown striation or mottling on a white background, either uniformly or punctately. The spire is elevated and somewhat turreted, with an acute apex and impressed sutures. The six whorls are convex, encircled by numerous closely spaced fine striae. The periphery is obtusely angular. The base of the shell is slightly convex with fine concentric lirae. The sculpture on the base is coarser than on the upper surface. The large aperture is rounded and quadrate, with an oblique columella that is straightened and slightly convex in the middle. The deep umbilicus is narrow, expanding into a tunnel shape at its opening.

This species is easily identifiable by its form, with the whorls being slightly swollen just below the sutures, and the base of the aperture typically being slightly emarginate.

== Distribution ==
This species occurs in the North Atlantic Ocean and in the North Sea from Gibraltar to the Barentz Sea.
