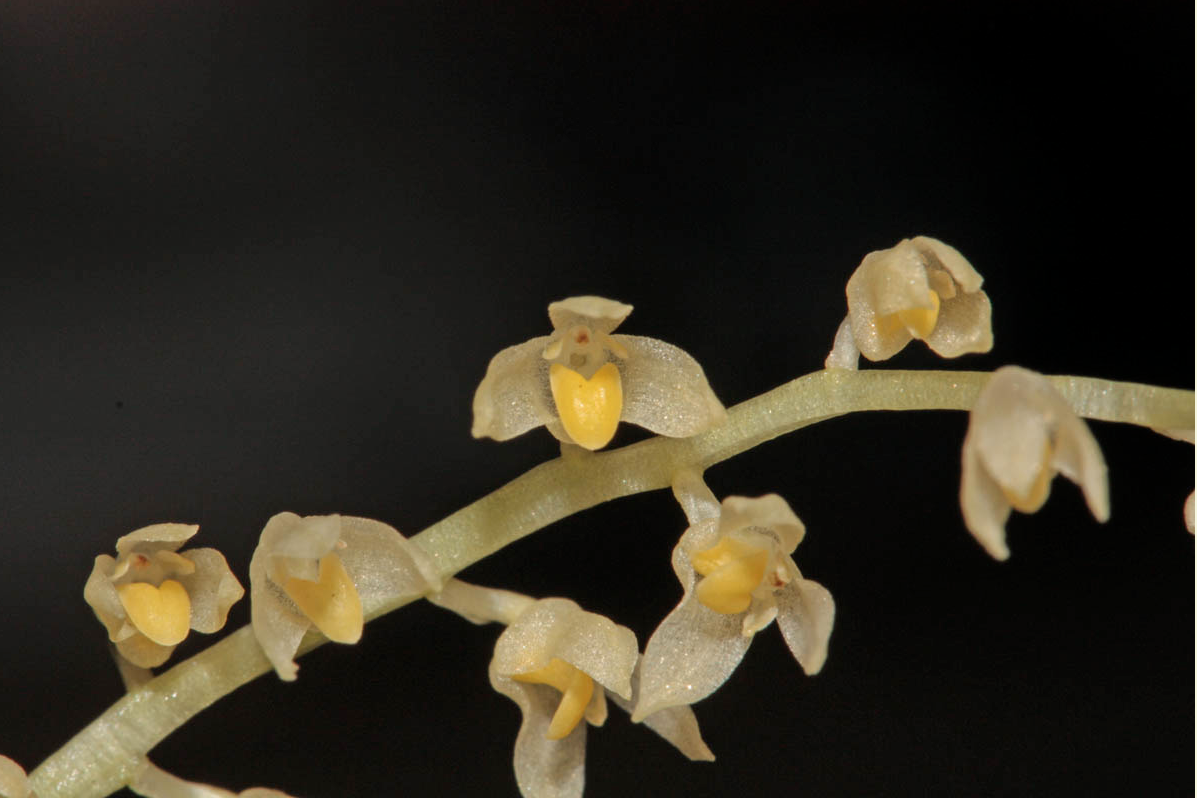
- Bulbophyllum apodum

Scientific classification
- Kingdom: Plantae
- Clade: Tracheophytes
- Clade: Angiosperms
- Clade: Monocots
- Order: Asparagales
- Family: Orchidaceae
- Subfamily: Epidendroideae
- Genus: Bulbophyllum
- Section: Bulbophyllum sect. Stachysanthes (Bl.) J.J. Verm. & P. O’Byrne 2008

Type species
- Bulbophyllum gibbosum

Species
- See text

Synonyms
- Diphyes sect. Stachysanthes Bl.1825; Diphyes sect. Diptychanthes Bl.1825; Bulbophyllum sect. Aphanobulbon Schltr.1912; Bulbophyllum sect. Diadochanthe J.J.Sm. 1927; Bulbophyllum sect. Stathmocaulos Schlecter 1911; Bulbophyllum sect. Ceratostylopsis Schlechter 1925; Bulbophyllum sect. Minahassaea Schlechter

= Bulbophyllum sect. Stachysanthes =

Section of flowering plants

Bulbophyllum sect. Stachysanthes is a section of the genus Bulbophyllum.

== Description ==
Species in this section have minute pseduobulbs.

== Distribution ==
Plants from this section are found from India, China, Taiwan, eastward to Thailand, peninsular Malaysia, Sumatra, Java, Borneo, the Philippines and Sulawesi.

== Species ==
Bulbophyllum section Stachysanthes comprises the following species:

Image	Name	Distribution	Elevation (m)
	Bulbophyllum agapethoides Schltr. 1911	Sulawesi	1,000–1,700 metres (3,300–5,600 ft)
	Bulbophyllum alliifolium J.J.Sm. 1905	Java, Sulawesi	800–1,900 metres (2,600–6,200 ft)
	Bulbophyllum apodum Hook.f. 1890	Borneo, China, Malaysia, Thailand, the Philippines, Vanuatu, Vietnam, Moluccas, Bismark Archipelago, New Guinea, Solomon Islands, Fiji, New Caledonia, Vanuatu, Wallis and Futuna Islands and Samoa .	0–2,000 metres (0–6,562 ft)
	Bulbophyllum arachnites Ridl. 1909	peninsular Malaysia, Brunei and Sabah Borneo	1,300–1,500 metres (4,300–4,900 ft)
	Bulbophyllum armeniacum J.J.Sm. 1917	Malaysia, Borneo, Sumatra	1,200–1,500 metres (3,900–4,900 ft)
	Bulbophyllum auroreum J.J.Sm. 1928	Sumatra	1,300–1,700 metres (4,300–5,600 ft)
	Bulbophyllum brevicolumna J.J.Verm. 1991	Borneo	1,300–1,500 metres (4,300–4,900 ft)
	Bulbophyllum caudatisepalum Ames & C.Schweinf. 1920	Malaysia and Borneo	800–2,400 metres (2,600–7,900 ft)
	Bulbophyllum ceratostylis J.J.Sm. 1904	Borneo and Sumatra	900–1,700 metres (3,000–5,600 ft)
	Bulbophyllum citricolor J.J.Sm. 1932	Sumatra	
	Bulbophyllum clemensiae Ames 1912	Philippines (Mindanao)	700–1,200 metres (2,300–3,900 ft)
	Bulbophyllum conspectum J.J.Sm. 1927	Borneo	400–1,200 metres (1,300–3,900 ft)
	Bulbophyllum crassiusculum Cabactulan, Cootes, M.Leon & R.B.Pimentel 2018	Philippines	1,200 metres (3,900 ft)
	Bulbophyllum cyclophoroides J.J.Sm. 1928	Sumatra	1,150 metres (3,770 ft)
	Bulbophyllum dasypetalum Rolfe ex Ames 1905	Philippines	900 metres (3,000 ft)
	Bulbophyllum deltoideum Ames & Schweinf. 1920	Sarawak and Sabah Borneo	1,200–2,100 metres (3,900–6,900 ft)
	Bulbophyllum deminutum J.J.Sm. 1927	Sumatra	
	Bulbophyllum devium J.B.Comber 1990	Java	1,450–1,650 metres (4,760–5,410 ft)
	Bulbophyllum devogelii J.J.Verm. 1991	Sabah Borneo	1,600–2,000 metres (5,200–6,600 ft)
	Bulbophyllum dianthum Schltr. 1911	Sumatra	1,400 metres (4,600 ft)
	Bulbophyllum ebulbum King & Pantl. 1895	India	500 metres (1,600 ft)
	Bulbophyllum elachanthe J.J.Verm. 1991	Sabah Borneo	1,400 metres (4,600 ft)
	Bulbophyllum elaphoglossum Schltr. 1911	Sulawesi	1,200–2,500 metres (3,900–8,200 ft)
	Bulbophyllum escritorii Ames 1915	Philippines	2,000 metres (6,600 ft)
	Bulbophyllum falculicorne J.J.Sm. 1945	Sulawesi	2,700 metres (8,900 ft)
	Bulbophyllum flavescens (Blume) Lindl. 1830	Malaysia, Borneo, Java, The Philippines and Sumatra	30–3,800 metres (98–12,467 ft)
	Bulbophyllum gajoense J.J.Sm. 1943	Sumatera	2,250–2,750 metres (7,380–9,020 ft)
	Bulbophyllum gibbosum Lindl. 1830	Malaya, Sumatra, Borneo, Java	800–1,200 metres (2,600–3,900 ft)
	Bulbophyllum gimagaanense Ames 1912	Philippines	100–700 metres (330–2,300 ft)
	Bulbophyllum glaucifolium J.J.Verm. 1991	Sabah Borneo	1,700 metres (5,600 ft)
	Bulbophyllum grandilabre Carr 1935	Sarawak and Sabah Borneo	500–2,000 metres (1,600–6,600 ft)
	Bulbophyllum ionophyllum J.J.Verm. 1991	Sarawak and Sabah Borneo	1,100–1,700 metres (3,600–5,600 ft)
	Bulbophyllum ischnobasis J.J.Verm., O'Byrne and Lamb 2015	Sarawak Borneo	1,200 metres (3,900 ft)
	Bulbophyllum kapitense J.J.Verm., O'Byrne and Lamb 2015	Sarawak Borneo	
	Bulbophyllum korinchense Ridl. 1917	Sumatra	600–2,400 metres (2,000–7,900 ft)
	Bulbophyllum korthalsii Schltr.1907	Malaysia and Sumatra	200–950 metres (660–3,120 ft)
	Bulbophyllum lancipetalum Ames 1912	the Philippines	
	Bulbophyllum leptosepalum Hook.f. 1890	peninsular Malaysia	
	Bulbophyllum leytense Ames 1915	Philippines	200–500 metres (660–1,640 ft)
	Bulbophyllum longimucronatum Ames & C.Schweinf. 1920	Sabah Borneo	1,000–2,000 metres (3,300–6,600 ft)
	Bulbophyllum longipetiolatum Ames 1915	Philippines (Mindanao)	1,300 metres (4,300 ft)
	Bulbophyllum lygeron J.J.Verm. 1991	Sabah Borneo	1,100–2,000 metres (3,600–6,600 ft)
	Bulbophyllum marivelense Ames 1912	Philippines	1,100 metres (3,600 ft)
	Bulbophyllum masaganapense Ames 1920	Philippines (Luzon, Leyte)	600 metres (2,000 ft)
	Bulbophyllum mengyuanense Q.Liu, J.W.Li & X.H.Jin 2015	China (Yunnan)	1,000 metres (3,300 ft)
	Bulbophyllum mentiferum J.J.Sm. 1927	Sumatra	1,700–2,200 metres (5,600–7,200 ft)
	Bulbophyllum migueldavidii Cootes, Cabactulan & Pimentel 2017	The Philippines (Mindanao)	1,600 metres (5,200 ft)
	Bulbophyllum multiflexum J.J.Sm. 1927	Borneo	
	Bulbophyllum mutabile Lindl. 1830	Thailand, peninsular Malaysia, Borneo, Java, the Philippines, Bali and Celebes	1,100–2,700 metres (3,600–8,900 ft)
	Bulbophyllum oblanceolatum King & Pantl. 1879	peninsula Malaysia	1,036 metres (3,399 ft)
	Bulbophyllum obliquum Schltr. 1911	Sulawesi	1,000–2,500 metres (3,300–8,200 ft)
	Bulbophyllum obtusipetalum J.J.Sm. 1905	peninsular Malaysia, Java, Sumatra and Borneo	1,300–1,500 metres (4,300–4,900 ft)
	Bulbophyllum ochroxanthum J.J.Verm. & Lamb 2013	Borneo (Brunei)	
	Bulbophyllum odoratum (Blume) Lindl. 1830	Malaysia, Sumatra, Java, Lesser Sunda Island, Borneo, Sulawesi, the Moluccas and the Philippines	900–2,400 metres (3,000–7,900 ft)
	Bulbophyllum pauciflorum Ames 1912	Vietnam, China (Hainan), Taiwan and Luzon Philippines	300–1,500 metres (980–4,920 ft)
	Bulbophyllum perpendiculare Schltr. 1911	Sulawesi	1,000–1,200 metres (3,300–3,900 ft)
	Bulbophyllum petiolatum J.J.Sm. 1910	Java	1,000–1,500 metres (3,300–4,900 ft)
	Bulbophyllum pleochromum J.J.Verm. & Lamb 2013	Borneo	
	Bulbophyllum pocillum J.J.Verm. 1991	Sabah Borneo	1,000–2,100 metres (3,300–6,900 ft)
	Bulbophyllum peperomiifolium J.J.Sm. 1918	Java	1,000 metres (3,300 ft)
	Bulbophyllum prianganense J.J.Sm. 1913	Java and Sumatra	1,400 metres (4,600 ft)
	Bulbophyllum puberulosum Cabactulan, Cootes, M.Leon & R.B.Pimentel 2018	Philippines	1,200 metres (3,900 ft)
	Bulbophyllum pugilanthum J.J.Wood 1994	Borneo	1,200–2,400 metres (3,900–7,900 ft)
	Bulbophyllum rhizomatosum Ames & C.Schweinf. 1920	Malaysia, Borneo and the Philippines	1,100–1,500 metres (3,600–4,900 ft)
	Bulbophyllum semperflorens J.J.Sm. 1907	western Java	800–1,000 metres (2,600–3,300 ft)
	Bulbophyllum sempiternum Ames 1920	Philippines	500–750 metres (1,640–2,460 ft)
	Bulbophyllum sigmoideum Ames & C.Schweinf. 1920	Sabah Borneo	1,000–1,700 metres (3,300–5,600 ft)
	Bulbophyllum simulacrum Ames 1915	Philippines	500–750 metres (1,640–2,460 ft)
	Bulbophyllum sopoetanense Schltr. 1911	Sulawesi	1,200–2,100 metres (3,900–6,900 ft)
	Bulbophyllum stelis J.J.Sm. 1927	Sumatra, Java	300 metres (980 ft)
	Bulbophyllum stipitatibulbum J.J.Sm. 1931	Borneo	1,500–2,100 metres (4,900–6,900 ft)
	Bulbophyllum subclausum J.J.Sm. 1909	Sabah Borneo	1,500–2,100 metres (4,900–6,900 ft)
	Bulbophyllum subaequale Ames 1923	Philippines (Luzon)	300 metres (980 ft)
	Bulbophyllum succedaneum J.J.Sm. 1927	Borneo	1,000–1,700 metres (3,300–5,600 ft)
	Bulbophyllum tectipes J.J.Verm. & P.O'Byrne 2003	Sulawesi	500–2,500 metres (1,600–8,200 ft)
	Bulbophyllum tokioi Fukuy. 1935	Taiwan	600–800 metres (2,000–2,600 ft)
	Bulbophyllum trineuron J.J.Verm. 2013	Borneo (Sabah)	
	Bulbophyllum tropidopous J.J.Verm., P.O'Byrne & A.L.Lamb 2015	Sarawak, Brunei and Sabah Borneo	1,000–2,400 metres (3,300–7,900 ft)
	Bulbophyllum unguiculatum Rchb.f. 1850	Sumatra, Java, Borneo, New Guinea and the Philippines	900–2,500 metres (3,000–8,200 ft)
	Bulbophyllum vagans Ames & Rolfe 1907	Philippines	800–1,400 metres (2,600–4,600 ft)
	Bulbophyllum vermiculare Hook.f. 1890	Malaysia, Borneo and the Philippines	0–1,000 metres (0–3,281 ft)
	Bulbophyllum zambalense Ames 1912	Philippines	1,700 metres (5,600 ft)
