= Baritius =

Scientific classification
- Kingdom: Animalia
- Phylum: Arthropoda
- Class: Insecta
- Order: Lepidoptera
- Superfamily: Noctuoidea
- Family: Erebidae
- Subfamily: Arctiinae
- Subtribe: Phaegopterina
- Genus: Baritius; Walker, 1855

Synonyms
- Thysanoprymna Butler, 1875; Pseudeucereon Möschler, 1878

Genus of moths

Baritius is a genus of moths in the family Erebidae. The genus was erected by Francis Walker in 1855.

== Species ==
- Baritius acuminata (Walker, 1856)
- Baritius affinis Rothschild, 1910
- Baritius brunnea Hampson, 1901
- Baritius cerdai Toulgoët, 2001
- Baritius cyclozonata (Hampson, 1901)
- Baritius discalis Walker, 1855
- Baritius eleuthera (Stoll, [1781])
- Baritius eleutheroides Rothschild, 1909
- Baritius flavescens Rothschild, 1909
- Baritius grandis Rothschild, 1909
- Baritius hampsoni (Dognin, 1907)
- Baritius haemorrhoides Schaus, 1905
- Baritius kawensis Toulgoët, 2001
- Baritius nigridorsipeltatus Strand, 1921
- Baritius sannionis Rothschild, 1909

== Former species ==
- Baritius cepiana (Druce, 1893)
- Baritius drucei Rothschild, 1910
- Baritius morio Seitz, 1920
- Baritius palmeri Rothschild, 1916
- Baritius pyrrhopyga (Walker, [1865])
- Baritius roseocincta Seitz, 1920
- Baritius superba (Schaus, 1889)
