= B. flavescens =

B. flavescens may refer to:

- Bachia flavescens, a spectacled lizard
- Baritius flavescens, a Brazilian moth
- Bembicium flavescens, a sea snail
- Bembix flavescens, a sand wasp
- Berchemia flavescens, a climbing plant
- Bittacus flavescens, a hanging fly
- Boissonneaua flavescens, a South American hummingbird
- Bombus flavescens, a social insect
- Brachodes flavescens, an Italian moth
- Brachyopa flavescens, a flower fly
- Bulbophyllum flavescens, a flowering plant
