= Baritius brunnea =

Scientific classification
- Kingdom: Animalia
- Phylum: Arthropoda
- Class: Insecta
- Order: Lepidoptera
- Superfamily: Noctuoidea
- Family: Erebidae
- Subfamily: Arctiinae
- Genus: Baritius
- Species: B. brunnea

Binomial name
- Baritius brunnea Hampson, 1901

Species of moth

Baritius brunnea is a moth of the family Erebidae first described by George Hampson in 1901. It is found in the Amazon region.
