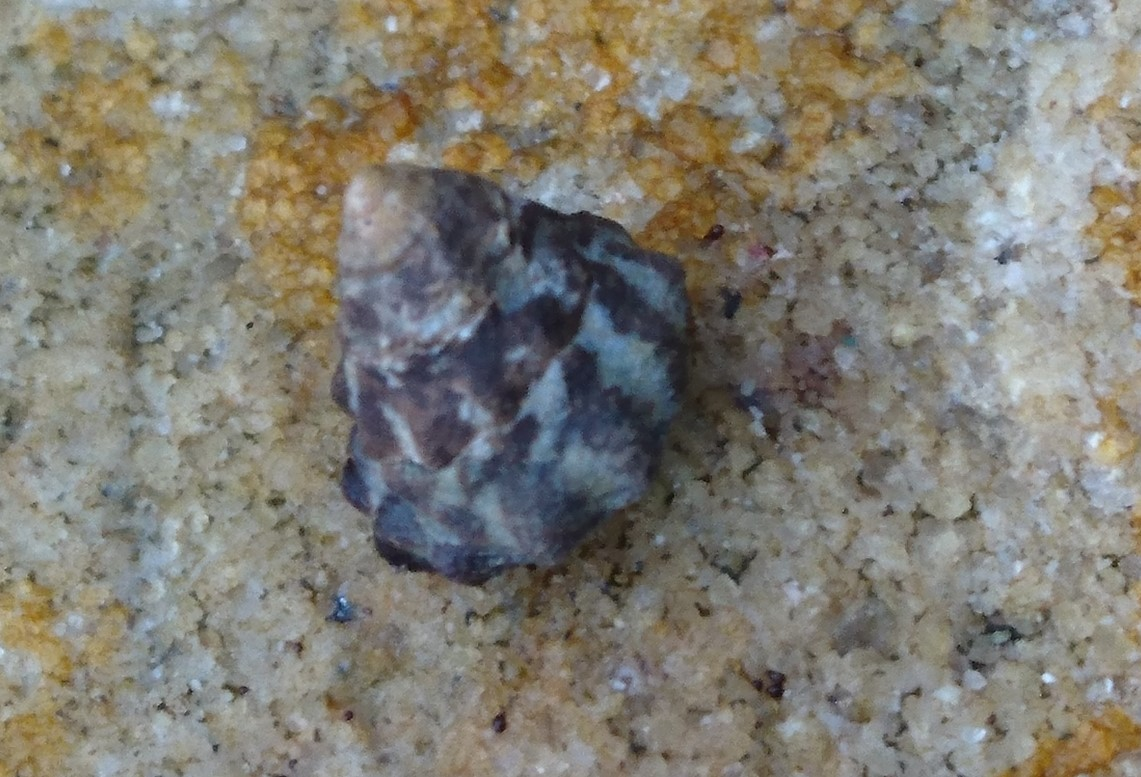

Scientific classification
- Kingdom: Animalia
- Phylum: Mollusca
- Class: Gastropoda
- Subclass: Caenogastropoda
- Order: Littorinimorpha
- Family: Littorinidae
- Genus: Bembicium
- Species: B. auratum

Binomial name
- Bembicium auratum (Quoy & Gaimard, 1834)

Synonyms
- Bembicium nodulosum Musgrave, 1929; Littorina imbricata Gray, 1839; Risella kielmannsegi Zelebor, 1866; Trochus auratus Quoy & Gaimard, 1834; Trochus cicatricosus Philippi, 1843

= Bembicium auratum =

Gold-mouthed conniwink

Species of gastropod

Bembicium auratum, commonly known as the gold-mouthed conniwink, is a species of sea snail, a marine gastropod mollusk in the family Littorinidae, the winkles or periwinkles.
