= Baritius sannionis =

Scientific classification
- Domain: Eukaryota
- Kingdom: Animalia
- Phylum: Arthropoda
- Class: Insecta
- Order: Lepidoptera
- Superfamily: Noctuoidea
- Family: Erebidae
- Subfamily: Arctiinae
- Genus: Baritius
- Species: B. sannionis

Binomial name
- Baritius sannionis Rothschild, 1909

Species of moth

Baritius sannionis is a moth of the family Erebidae. It was described by Walter Rothschild in 1909. It is found in French Guiana, Brazil, Ecuador, Peru, Bolivia and Costa Rica.
