= Baritius hampsoni =

Scientific classification
- Kingdom: Animalia
- Phylum: Arthropoda
- Class: Insecta
- Order: Lepidoptera
- Superfamily: Noctuoidea
- Family: Erebidae
- Subfamily: Arctiinae
- Genus: Baritius
- Species: B. hampsoni

Binomial name
- Baritius hampsoni (Dognin, 1902)

Synonyms
- Mesolasia hampsoni Dognin, 1902; Baritius peculiaris Rothschild, 1909

Species of moth

Baritius hampsoni is a moth of the subfamily Arctiinae. It was described by Paul Dognin in 1902. It is found in Costa Rica and Peru.

== Subspecies ==
- Baritius hampsoni hampsoni (Peru)
- Baritius hampsoni flava Rothschild, 1935 (Costa Rica)
