= Bembicium vittatum =

Scientific classification
- Kingdom: Animalia
- Phylum: Mollusca
- Class: Gastropoda
- Subclass: Caenogastropoda
- Order: Littorinimorpha
- Family: Littorinidae
- Genus: Bembicium
- Species: B. vittatum

Binomial name
- Bembicium vittatum Philippi, 1846

Synonyms
- Risella bruni Crosse, 1864; Risella fimbriata Philippi, 1846

Species of gastropod

Bembicium vittatum is a species of sea snail, a marine gastropod mollusk in the family Littorinidae, the winkles or periwinkles.
