= Baritius cyclozonata =

Scientific classification
- Kingdom: Animalia
- Phylum: Arthropoda
- Class: Insecta
- Order: Lepidoptera
- Superfamily: Noctuoidea
- Family: Erebidae
- Subfamily: Arctiinae
- Genus: Baritius
- Species: B. cyclozonata

Binomial name
- Baritius cyclozonata (Hampson, 1901)

Synonyms
- Halisidota cyclozonata Hampson, 1901

Species of moth

Baritius cyclozonata is a moth of the family Erebidae. It was described by George Hampson in 1901. It is found in French Guiana, Suriname, Brazil, the Amazon region, Ecuador, Peru and Bolivia.
