= Baritius eleutheroides =

Scientific classification
- Domain: Eukaryota
- Kingdom: Animalia
- Phylum: Arthropoda
- Class: Insecta
- Order: Lepidoptera
- Superfamily: Noctuoidea
- Family: Erebidae
- Subfamily: Arctiinae
- Genus: Baritius
- Species: B. eleutheroides

Binomial name
- Baritius eleutheroides Rothschild, 1909

Species of moth

Baritius eleutheroides is a moth of the family Erebidae first described by Walter Rothschild in 1909. It is found in Brazil, Peru, Suriname, French Guiana, Venezuela, Ecuador and Costa Rica.
