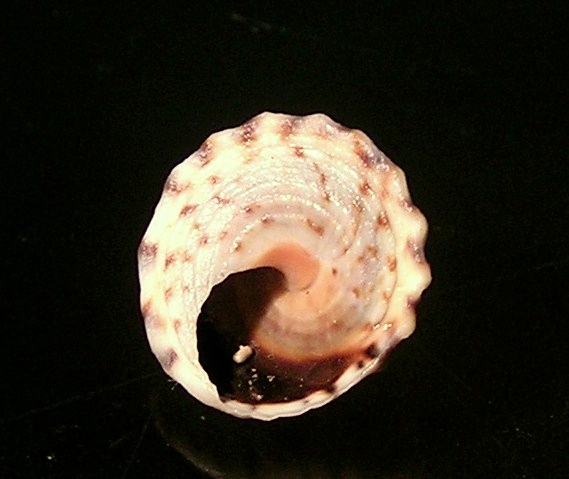
- Bembicium melanostoma

Scientific classification
- Kingdom: Animalia
- Phylum: Mollusca
- Class: Gastropoda
- Subclass: Caenogastropoda
- Order: Littorinimorpha
- Family: Littorinidae
- Subfamily: Lacuninae
- Genus: Bembicium; Philippi, 1846

Synonyms
- Risella Gray, 1842

= Bembicium =

Genus of gastropods

Bembicium is a genus of sea snails, marine gastropod mollusks in the family Littorinidae, the winkles or periwinkles.

== Description ==
(Described as Risella) The depressed shell is trochiform, with flattened whorls and a keeled periphery. The shell is not umbilicated. The aperture is rhomboidal, marked with brown inside the margin. The operculum is paucispiral.

These shells are distinguished from Trochus, which they resemble in form and sculpture, by their non-nacreous interior. The animal is distinguished by eyes on the tentacles instead of on peduncles, and by the absence of the lateral membranes of the foot.

== Species ==
The following species are recognised in the genus Bembicium:

- †Bembicium altum (Tate, 1894)
- Bembicium auratum (Quoy & Gaimard, 1834)
- Bembicium flavescens (R. A. Philippi, 1851)
- †Bembicium hokianga (Laws, 1948)
- Bembicium melanostoma (Gmelin, 1791)
- Bembicium nanum (Lamarck, 1822)
- †Bembicium priscum Powell & Bartrum, 1929
- Bembicium vittatum R. A. Philippi, 1846
