= Baritius acuminata =

Scientific classification
- Kingdom: Animalia
- Phylum: Arthropoda
- Class: Insecta
- Order: Lepidoptera
- Superfamily: Noctuoidea
- Family: Erebidae
- Subfamily: Arctiinae
- Genus: Baritius
- Species: B. acuminata

Binomial name
- Baritius acuminata (Walker, 1856)

Synonyms
- Pampa acuminata Walker, 1856; Sychesia hartmanni Schaus, 1892

Species of moth

Baritius acuminata is a moth of the family Erebidae first described by Francis Walker in 1856. It is found in Brazil, Argentina and Paraguay.
