= Thysanoprymna =

Scientific classification
- Domain: Eukaryota
- Kingdom: Animalia
- Phylum: Arthropoda
- Class: Insecta
- Order: Lepidoptera
- Superfamily: Noctuoidea
- Family: Erebidae
- Subfamily: Arctiinae
- Subtribe: Phaegopterina
- Genus: Thysanoprymna; Butler, 1875

Type species
- Eucereon pyrrhopyga

Genus of moths

Thysanoprymna is a genus of moths in the family Erebidae.

== Species ==
- Thysanoprymna cepiana Druce, 1893
- Thysanoprymna drucei (Rothschild, 1910)
- Thysanoprymna haemorrhoides (Schaus, 1905)
- Thysanoprymna hampsoni (Dognin, 1902)
- Thysanoprymna morio (Seitz, 1920)
- Thysanoprymna palmeri (Rothschild, 1916)
- Thysanoprymna pyrrhopyga (Walker, [1865])
- Thysanoprymna roseocincta (Seitz, 1920)
- Thysanoprymna superba (Schaus, 1889)
