= Baritius haemorrhoides =

Scientific classification
- Domain: Eukaryota
- Kingdom: Animalia
- Phylum: Arthropoda
- Class: Insecta
- Order: Lepidoptera
- Superfamily: Noctuoidea
- Family: Erebidae
- Subfamily: Arctiinae
- Genus: Baritius
- Species: B. haemorrhoides

Binomial name
- Baritius haemorrhoides Schaus, 1905

Species of moth

Baritius haemorrhoides is a moth of the subfamily Arctiinae. It was described by William Schaus in 1905. It is found in French Guiana.
