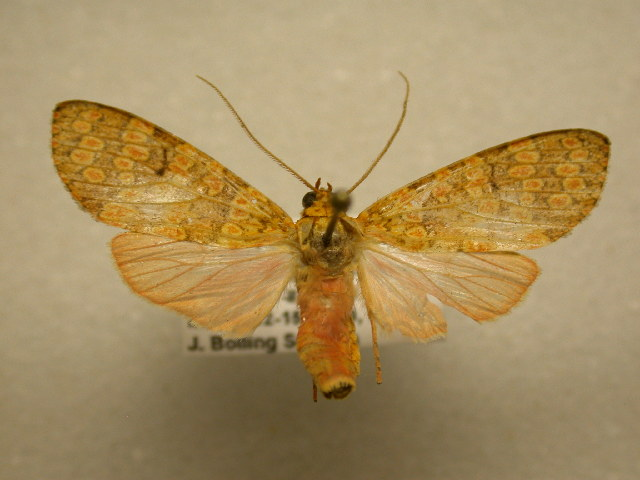

Scientific classification
- Domain: Eukaryota
- Kingdom: Animalia
- Phylum: Arthropoda
- Class: Insecta
- Order: Lepidoptera
- Superfamily: Noctuoidea
- Family: Erebidae
- Subfamily: Arctiinae
- Genus: Baritius
- Species: B. grandis

Binomial name
- Baritius grandis (Rothschild, 1909)

Synonyms
- Baritius sannionis grandis Rothschild, 1909; Halysidota grandis (Rothschild, 1909)

= Baritius grandis =

Species of moth

Baritius grandis is a moth of the family Erebidae. It was described by Walter Rothschild in 1909. It is found in Costa Rica, Peru and Ecuador.
