= Baritius nigridorsipeltatus =

Scientific classification
- Domain: Eukaryota
- Kingdom: Animalia
- Phylum: Arthropoda
- Class: Insecta
- Order: Lepidoptera
- Superfamily: Noctuoidea
- Family: Erebidae
- Subfamily: Arctiinae
- Genus: Baritius
- Species: B. nigridorsipeltatus

Binomial name
- Baritius nigridorsipeltatus Strand, 1921

Species of moth

Baritius nigridorsipeltatus is a moth of the family Erebidae first described by Embrik Strand in 1921. It is found in Argentina.
