= Baritius cerdai =

Scientific classification
- Kingdom: Animalia
- Phylum: Arthropoda
- Class: Insecta
- Order: Lepidoptera
- Superfamily: Noctuoidea
- Family: Erebidae
- Subfamily: Arctiinae
- Genus: Baritius
- Species: B. cerdai

Binomial name
- Baritius cerdai Toulgoët, 2001

Species of moth

Baritius cerdai is a moth of the family Erebidae. It was described by Hervé de Toulgoët in 2001. It is found in French Guiana.
