= Baritius discalis =

Scientific classification
- Kingdom: Animalia
- Phylum: Arthropoda
- Class: Insecta
- Order: Lepidoptera
- Superfamily: Noctuoidea
- Family: Erebidae
- Subfamily: Arctiinae
- Genus: Baritius
- Species: B. discalis

Binomial name
- Baritius discalis Walker, 1855

Species of moth

Baritius discalis is a moth of the family Erebidae first described by Francis Walker in 1855. It is found in Brazil.
