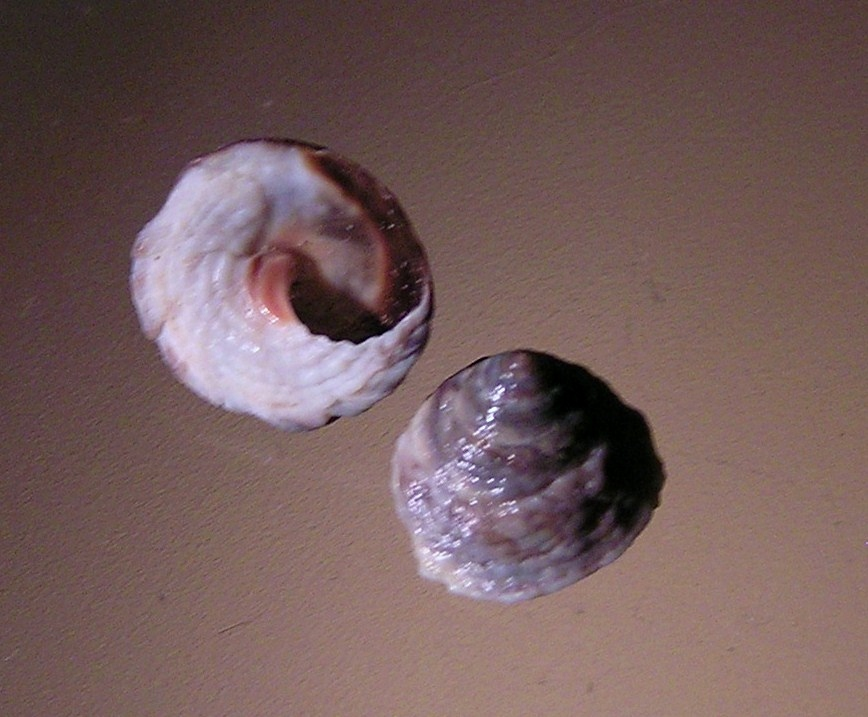

Scientific classification
- Kingdom: Animalia
- Phylum: Mollusca
- Class: Gastropoda
- Subclass: Caenogastropoda
- Order: Littorinimorpha
- Family: Littorinidae
- Genus: Bembicium
- Species: B. nanum

Binomial name
- Bembicium nanum (Lamarck, 1822)

Synonyms
- Bembicium pictum Philippi, 1846; Littorina australis Gray, 1839; Risella crassa Dunker, 1861; Risella grisea Philippi, 1851; Trochus acuminatus Wood, 1828; Trochus nanus Lamarck, 1822; Trochus planus Quoy & Gaimard, 1834

= Bembicium nanum =

Species of gastropod

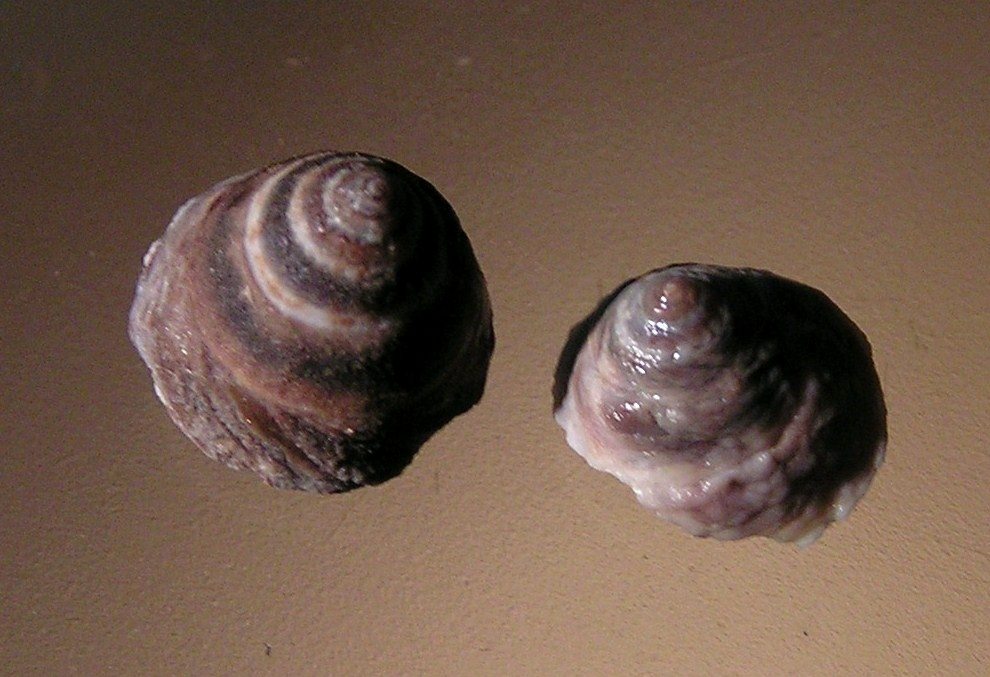
top view

Bembicium nanum is a species of sea snail, a marine gastropod mollusk in the family Littorinidae, the winkles or periwinkles.
