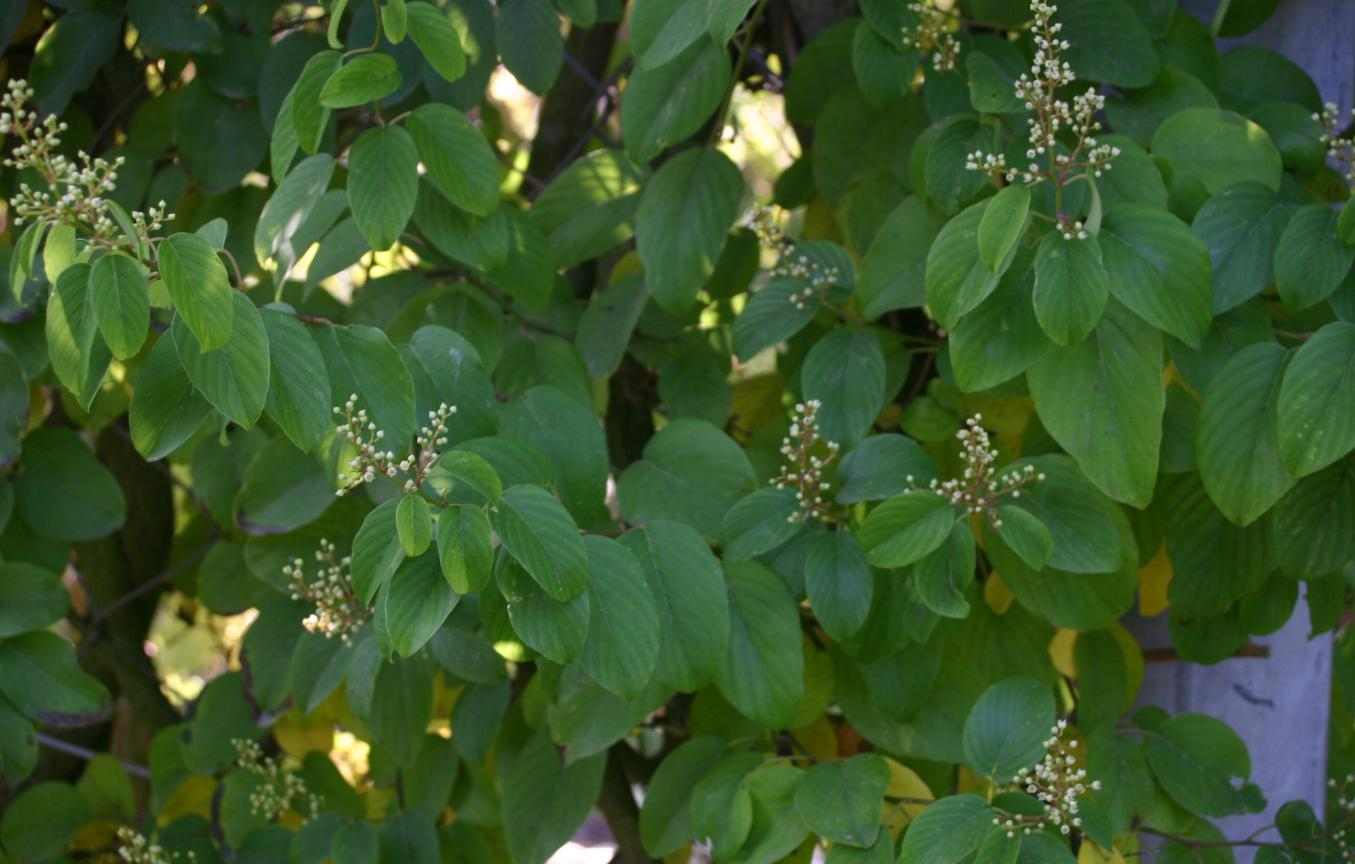
- Berchemia racemosa

Scientific classification
- Kingdom: Plantae
- Clade: Tracheophytes
- Clade: Angiosperms
- Clade: Eudicots
- Clade: Rosids
- Order: Rosales
- Family: Rhamnaceae
- Tribe: Rhamneae
- Genus: Berchemia; Neck. ex DC.

Species
- See text

Synonyms
- Araliorhamnus H.Perrier; Oenoplea R.Hedw.

= Berchemia =

Genus of flowering plants

Berchemia is a genus of plants in the family Rhamnaceae, named after Dutch botanist Berthout van Berchem. They are climbing plants or small to medium-sized trees that occur mostly in Southeast Asia, with one species in North America.

== Species ==
As of December 2025, Plants of the World Online accepts the following 36 species:

- Berchemia annamensis Pit.
- Berchemia arisanensis Y.C.Liu & F.Y.Lu
- Berchemia barbigera C.Y.Wu
- Berchemia brachycarpa C.Y.Wu
- Berchemia burmanniana DC.
- Berchemia cinerascens (Blume) Miq.
- Berchemia compressicarpa D.Fang & C.Z.Gao
- Berchemia edgeworthii M.A.Lawson
- Berchemia elmeri C.K.Schneid.
- Berchemia fenchifuensis C.M.Wang & S.Y.Lu
- Berchemia flavescens (Wall.) Wall. ex Brongn.
- Berchemia floribunda (Wall.) Brongn.
- Berchemia formosana C.K.Schneid.
- Berchemia hirtella H.T.Tsai & K.M.Feng
- Berchemia hispida (H.T.Tsai & K.M.Feng) Y.L.Chen & P.K.Chou
- Berchemia huana Rehder
- Berchemia jainiana Pusalkar & D.K.Singh
- Berchemia kulingensis C.K.Schneid.
- Berchemia lineata (L.) DC.
- Berchemia longipedicellata Y.L.Chen & P.K.Chou
- Berchemia longipes Y.L.Chen & P.K.Chou
- Berchemia longiracemosa Okuyama
- Berchemia loureiroana DC.
- Berchemia medogensis Y.L.Chen & Y.F.Du
- Berchemia omeiensis D.Fang
- Berchemia pakistanica Browicz
- Berchemia paniculata S.S.Ying
- Berchemia pauciflora Maxim.
- Berchemia philippinensis S.Vidal
- Berchemia poilanei Tardieu
- Berchemia polyphylla Wall. ex M.A.Lawson
- Berchemia pubiflora (DC.) Miq.
- Berchemia scandens (Hill) K.Koch
- Berchemia sinica C.K.Schneid.
- Berchemia yunnanensis Franch.
- Berchemia zhejiangensis Y.F.Lu & X.F.Jin
