= Baritius affinis =

Scientific classification
- Domain: Eukaryota
- Kingdom: Animalia
- Phylum: Arthropoda
- Class: Insecta
- Order: Lepidoptera
- Superfamily: Noctuoidea
- Family: Erebidae
- Subfamily: Arctiinae
- Genus: Baritius
- Species: B. affinis

Binomial name
- Baritius affinis Rothschild, 1910

Species of moth

Baritius affinis is a moth of the family Erebidae first described by Walter Rothschild in 1910. It is found in Brazil, French Guiana and Amazonas.
