= Bembicium priscum =

Scientific classification
- Kingdom: Animalia
- Phylum: Mollusca
- Class: Gastropoda
- Subclass: Caenogastropoda
- Order: Littorinimorpha
- Family: Littorinidae
- Genus: Bembicium
- Species: B. priscum

Binomial name
- Bembicium priscum Powell & Bartrum, 1929

Species of gastropod

Bembicium priscum is a species of sea snail, a marine gastropod mollusk in the family Littorinidae, the winkles or periwinkles.
