= Bembicium hokianga =

Scientific classification
- Kingdom: Animalia
- Phylum: Mollusca
- Class: Gastropoda
- Subclass: Caenogastropoda
- Order: Littorinimorpha
- Family: Littorinidae
- Genus: Bembicium
- Species: †B. hokianga

Binomial name
- †Bembicium hokianga (Laws, 1948)

Synonyms
- List: †Astraea (Astralium) hokianga Laws, 1948; Astraea hokianga Laws, 1948; †Bembicium discoideum D. Reid, 1988

Species of gastropod

Bembicium hokianga is an extinct species of sea snail, a marine gastropod mollusk in the family Littorinidae, the winkles or periwinkles.
