= Baritius eleuthera =

Scientific classification
- Domain: Eukaryota
- Kingdom: Animalia
- Phylum: Arthropoda
- Class: Insecta
- Order: Lepidoptera
- Superfamily: Noctuoidea
- Family: Erebidae
- Subfamily: Arctiinae
- Genus: Baritius
- Species: B. eleuthera

Binomial name
- Baritius eleuthera (Stoll, [1781])

Synonyms
- Phalaena eleuthera Stoll, [1781]

Species of moth

Baritius eleuthera is a moth of the family Erebidae first described by Caspar Stoll in 1781. It is found in Suriname, Ecuador, Peru, Bolivia, Panama and the Brazilian state of Amazonas.
