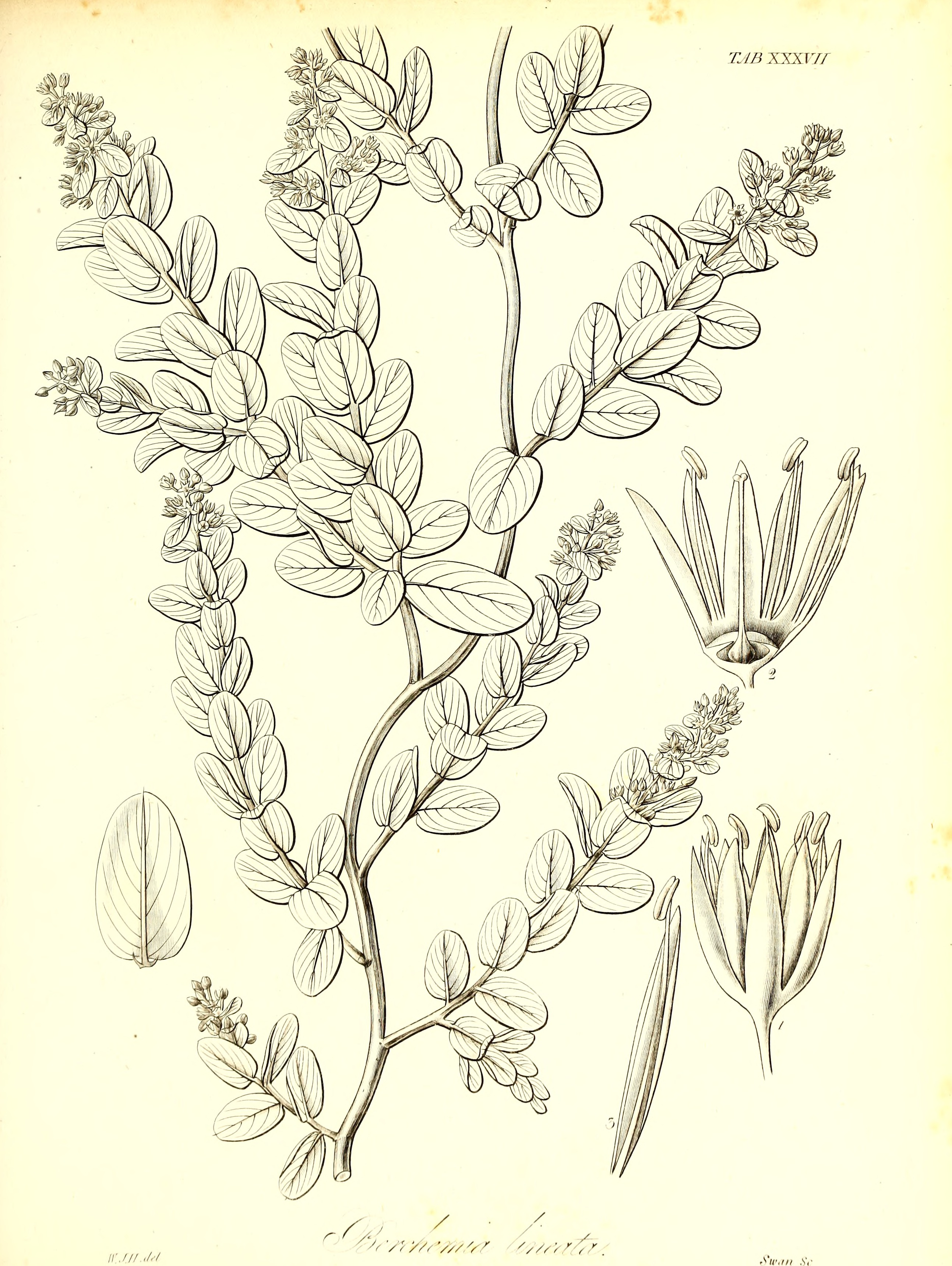

Scientific classification
- Kingdom: Plantae
- Clade: Tracheophytes
- Clade: Angiosperms
- Clade: Eudicots
- Clade: Rosids
- Order: Rosales
- Family: Rhamnaceae
- Genus: Berchemia
- Species: B. lineata

Binomial name
- Berchemia lineata (L.) DC.

= Berchemia lineata =

Species of plant

Berchemia lineata is a climbing plant in the family Rhamnaceae. It occurs naturally in dry thickets in the rainshadows of the central Asian mountains. B. lineata is found from northern China to Nepal, but is also cultivated in gardens.

== Uses ==
It is a medicinal plant of the Chinese traditional medicine. Berchemia giraldiana is used similarly.

== Bibliography ==
- 中药大辞典, 1995. Shanghai: 上海科学技术出版社, 1986, 1857–1858. ISBN 7-5323-0843-X
