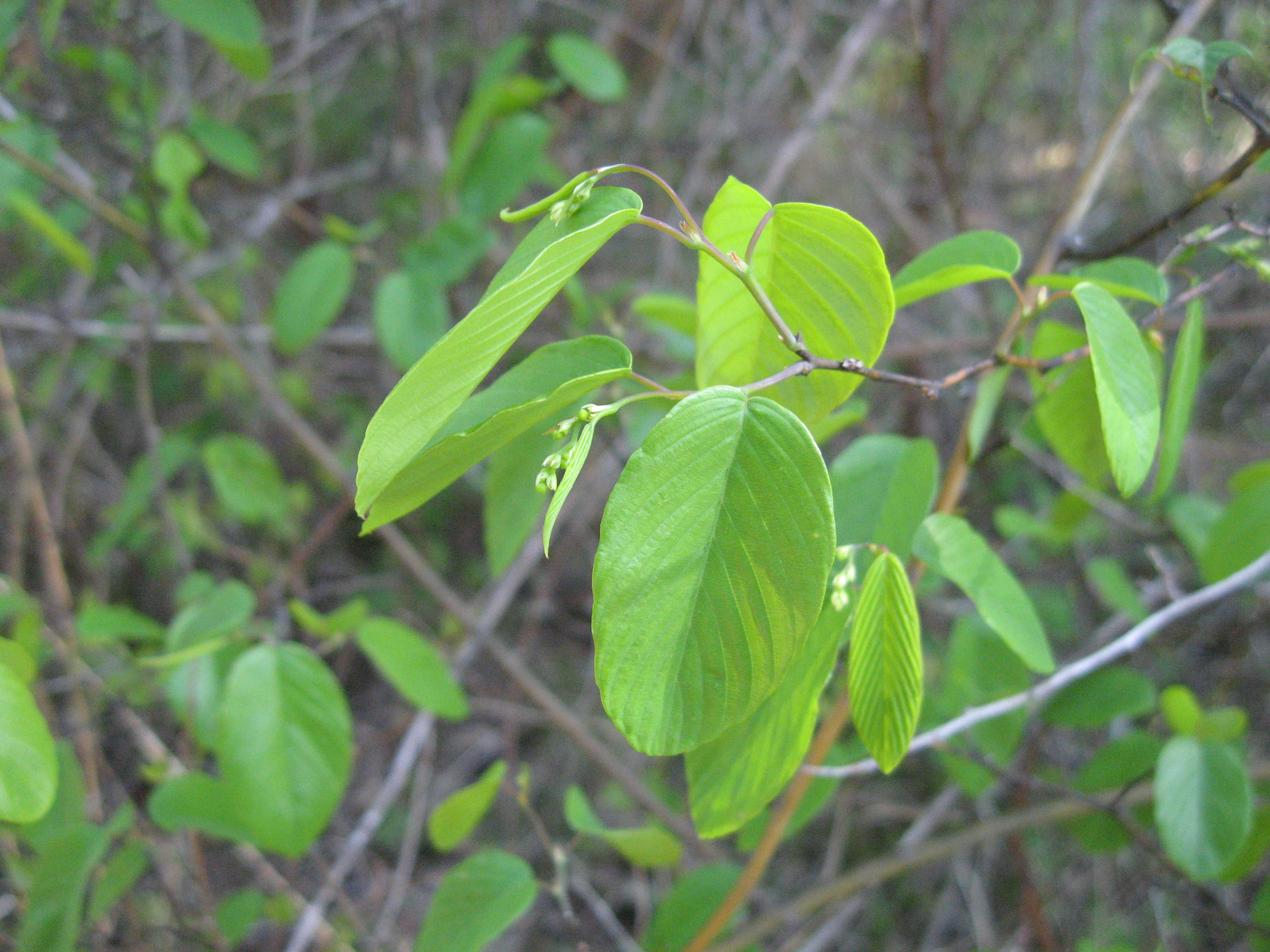

Conservation status
- Secure (NatureServe)

Scientific classification
- Kingdom: Plantae
- Clade: Tracheophytes
- Clade: Angiosperms
- Clade: Eudicots
- Clade: Rosids
- Order: Rosales
- Family: Rhamnaceae
- Genus: Berchemia
- Species: B. scandens

Binomial name
- Berchemia scandens (Hill) K. Koch

= Berchemia scandens =

Species of flowering plant

Berchemia scandens, commonly called supplejack, Alabama supplejack, Carolina supplejack, and American rattan, is a woody vine in the buckthorn family native to the southeastern United States. It is found in a wide variety of habitats, including swamps, bottomlands, streambanks, moist to dry upland forests, woodlands, glades, and prairies over calcareous rock or sediment.

It is a woody vine, with older stems reaching 18 cm (7.1 in) in diameter. The strong stems of the plant are often used for wickerwork.

== Traditional medicinal uses ==
The Houma people used a decoction of the aerial parts of the vine for impotency. Other Native Americans used the plant as a blood purifier and the ashes of the vine to treat coughs.
