= Bembicium altum =

Scientific classification
- Kingdom: Animalia
- Phylum: Mollusca
- Class: Gastropoda
- Subclass: Caenogastropoda
- Order: Littorinimorpha
- Family: Littorinidae
- Genus: Bembicium
- Species: B. altum

Binomial name
- Bembicium altum (Tate, 1894)

Synonyms
- Risella alta Tate, 1894

Species of gastropod

Bembicium altum is a species of sea snail, a marine gastropod mollusk in the family Littorinidae, the winkles or periwinkles.
