= Bulbophyllum dasypetalum =

Scientific classification
- Kingdom: Plantae
- Clade: Tracheophytes
- Clade: Angiosperms
- Clade: Monocots
- Order: Asparagales
- Family: Orchidaceae
- Subfamily: Epidendroideae
- Genus: Bulbophyllum
- Species: B. dasypetalum

Binomial name
- Bulbophyllum dasypetalum Rolfe ex Ames

Synonyms
- Bulbophyllum vanoverberghii Ames 1912

Species of orchid

Bulbophyllum dasypetalum is an orchid species in the genus Bulbophyllum.
