= Thysanoprymna morio =

Scientific classification
- Domain: Eukaryota
- Kingdom: Animalia
- Phylum: Arthropoda
- Class: Insecta
- Order: Lepidoptera
- Superfamily: Noctuoidea
- Family: Erebidae
- Subfamily: Arctiinae
- Genus: Thysanoprymna
- Species: T. morio

Binomial name
- Thysanoprymna morio (Seitz, 1920)

Synonyms
- Baritius morio Seitz, 1920

Species of moth

Thysanoprymna morio is a moth of the family Erebidae. It was described by Adalbert Seitz in 1920. It is found in Costa Rica.
