= Thysanoprymna drucei =

Scientific classification
- Domain: Eukaryota
- Kingdom: Animalia
- Phylum: Arthropoda
- Class: Insecta
- Order: Lepidoptera
- Superfamily: Noctuoidea
- Family: Erebidae
- Subfamily: Arctiinae
- Genus: Thysanoprymna
- Species: T. drucei

Binomial name
- Thysanoprymna drucei (Rothschild, 1910)

Synonyms
- Baritius drucei Rothschild, 1910

Species of moth

Thysanoprymna drucei is a moth of the family Erebidae. It was described by Walter Rothschild in 1910. It is found in Venezuela.
