= Thysanoprymna roseocincta =

Scientific classification
- Kingdom: Animalia
- Phylum: Arthropoda
- Class: Insecta
- Order: Lepidoptera
- Superfamily: Noctuoidea
- Family: Erebidae
- Subfamily: Arctiinae
- Genus: Thysanoprymna
- Species: T. roseocincta

Binomial name
- Thysanoprymna roseocincta (Seitz, 1920)

Synonyms
- Baritius roseocincta Seitz, 1920

Species of moth

Thysanoprymna roseocincta is a moth of the family Erebidae. It was described by Adalbert Seitz in 1920. It is found in Colombia.
