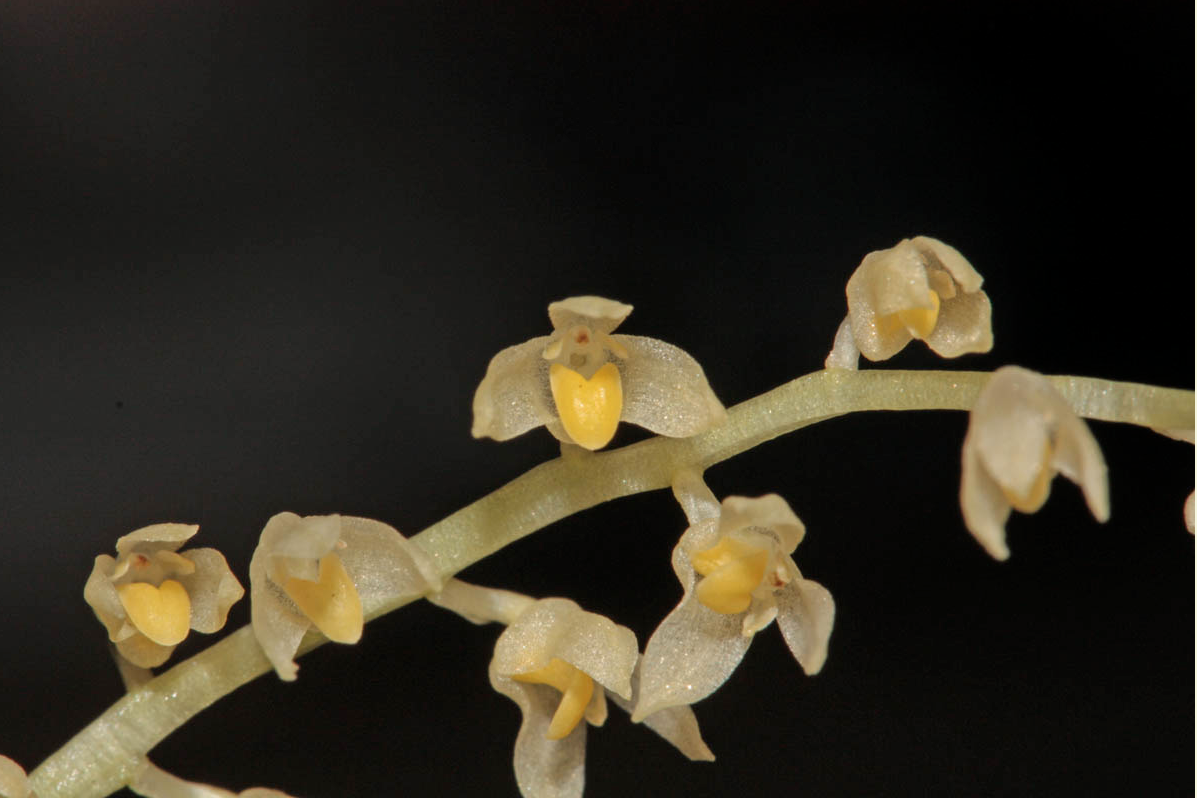

Scientific classification
- Kingdom: Plantae
- Clade: Tracheophytes
- Clade: Angiosperms
- Clade: Monocots
- Order: Asparagales
- Family: Orchidaceae
- Subfamily: Epidendroideae
- Genus: Bulbophyllum
- Species: B. apodum

Binomial name
- Bulbophyllum apodum Hook.f. 1890

Synonyms
- Bulbophyllum anguipes Schltr. 1911; Bulbophyllum apodum var. lanceolatum Ridl. 1917; Bulbophyllum balapiuense J.J.Sm. 1917; Bulbophyllum ebulbe Schltr. in K.M.Schumann & C.A.G.Lauterbach, 1905; Bulbophyllum ebulbum King & Pantl. 1895 publ. 1896; Bulbophyllum humiligibbum J.J.Sm. 1927; Bulbophyllum nigroscapum Ames i1922; Bulbophyllum oligoblepharon Schltr. 1911; Bulbophyllum polypodioides Schltr. 1906; Bulbophyllum saccatum Kraenzl. 1904; Bulbophyllum spathaceum Rolfe 1893; Bulbophyllum subebulbum Gagnep. 1950; Bulbophyllum umbonatum Kraenzl. 1916; Bulbophyllum vaginulosum Carr 1930; Bulbophyllum vidalii Tixier 1966

= Bulbophyllum apodum =

Species of orchid

Bulbophyllum apodum is a species of orchid in the genus Bulbophyllum. It bears a 12–14 cm inflorescence with around 40 small fragrant white flowers on it. It is native to Sikkim, Borneo, China, Malaysia, Thailand, the Philippines, Vanuatu, and Vietnam.
