= Berchemia flavescens =

Scientific classification
- Kingdom: Plantae
- Clade: Tracheophytes
- Clade: Angiosperms
- Clade: Eudicots
- Clade: Rosids
- Order: Rosales
- Family: Rhamnaceae
- Genus: Berchemia
- Species: B. flavescens

Binomial name
- Berchemia flavescens (Wall. ex Roxb.) Brongn.

Species of flowering plant

Berchemia flavescens is a climbing plant in the family Rhamnaceae. It occurs naturally in wet shady areas of the central Asian mountains and highlands. They are found from northern India to Bhutan, but are also cultivated in gardens.
