= Bulbophyllum succedaneum =

Scientific classification
- Kingdom: Plantae
- Clade: Tracheophytes
- Clade: Angiosperms
- Clade: Monocots
- Order: Asparagales
- Family: Orchidaceae
- Subfamily: Epidendroideae
- Genus: Bulbophyllum
- Species: B. succedaneum

Binomial name
- Bulbophyllum succedaneum J. J. Sm.

Species of orchid

Bulbophyllum succedaneum is a species of orchid in the genus Bulbophyllum.
