= Thysanoprymna pyrrhopyga =

Scientific classification
- Kingdom: Animalia
- Phylum: Arthropoda
- Class: Insecta
- Order: Lepidoptera
- Superfamily: Noctuoidea
- Family: Erebidae
- Subfamily: Arctiinae
- Genus: Thysanoprymna
- Species: T. pyrrhopyga

Binomial name
- Thysanoprymna pyrrhopyga (Walker, [1865])

Synonyms
- Baritius pyrrhopyga (Walker, [1865]); Eucereon pyrrhopyga Walker, [1865]

Species of moth

Thysanoprymna pyrrhopyga is a moth of the family Erebidae. It was described by Francis Walker in 1865. It is found in Brazil and Ecuador.
