= Bembicium flavescens =

Scientific classification
- Kingdom: Animalia
- Phylum: Mollusca
- Class: Gastropoda
- Subclass: Caenogastropoda
- Order: Littorinimorpha
- Family: Littorinidae
- Genus: Bembicium
- Species: B. flavescens

Binomial name
- Bembicium flavescens (Philippi, 1851)

Synonyms
- Risella flavescens Philippi, 1851; Risella plicatula Philippi, 1851

Species of gastropod

Bembicium flavescens is a species of sea snail, a marine gastropod mollusk in the family Littorinidae, the winkles or periwinkles.
