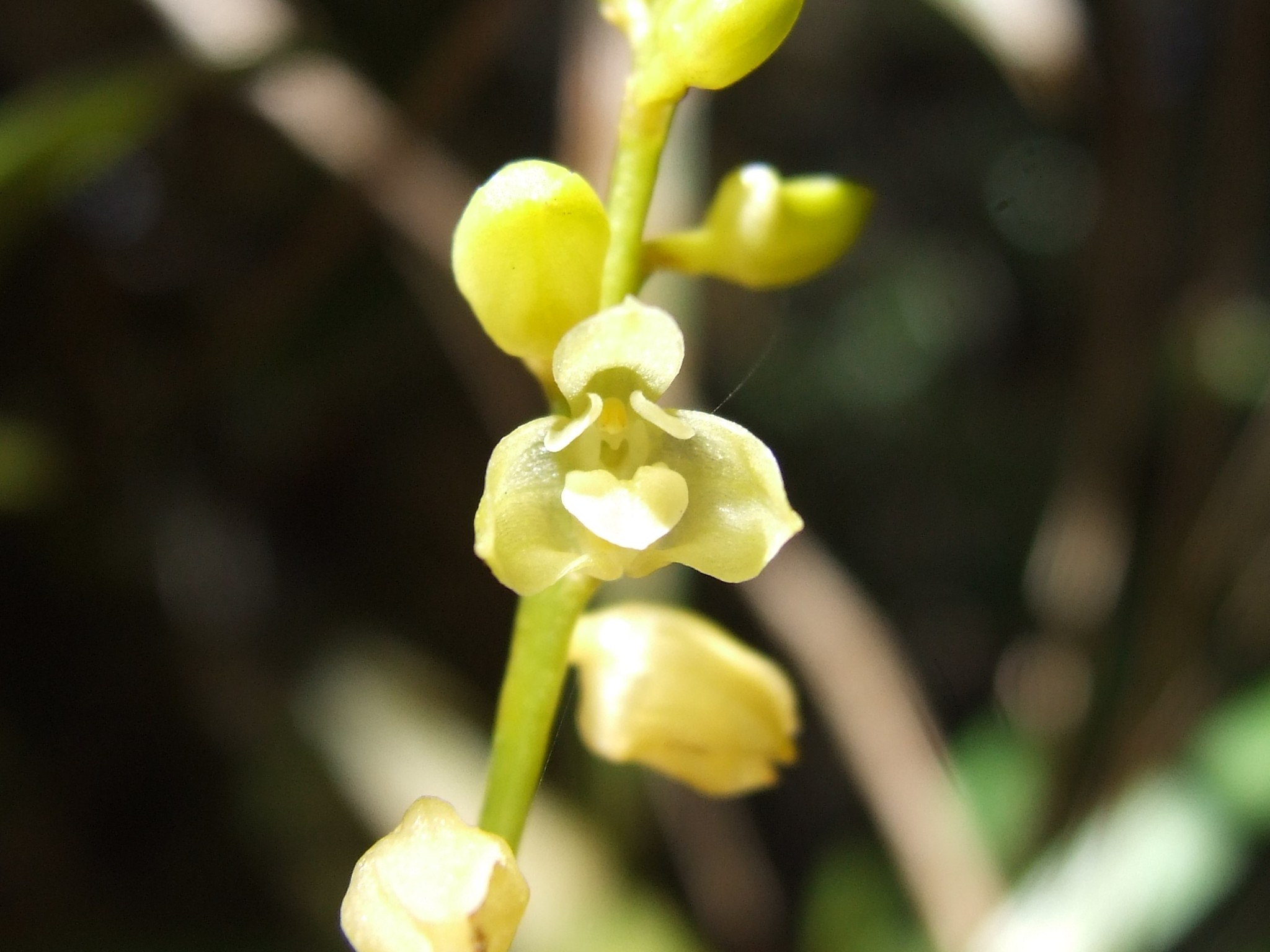
- Close-up of flowers

Scientific classification
- Kingdom: Plantae
- Clade: Tracheophytes
- Clade: Angiosperms
- Clade: Monocots
- Order: Asparagales
- Family: Orchidaceae
- Subfamily: Epidendroideae
- Genus: Bulbophyllum
- Species: B. unguiculatum

Binomial name
- Bulbophyllum unguiculatum Rchb. f.

= Bulbophyllum unguiculatum =

Species of orchid

Bulbophyllum unguiculatum is a species of orchid in the genus Bulbophyllum. It is commonly known as the clawed bulbophyllum. It is found in Sumatra, Java, Borneo and Sulawesi in lower montane forests.
