= Thysanoprymna superba =

Scientific classification
- Domain: Eukaryota
- Kingdom: Animalia
- Phylum: Arthropoda
- Class: Insecta
- Order: Lepidoptera
- Superfamily: Noctuoidea
- Family: Erebidae
- Subfamily: Arctiinae
- Genus: Thysanoprymna
- Species: T. superba

Binomial name
- Thysanoprymna superba (Schaus, 1889)

Synonyms
- Aclytia superba Schaus, 1889; Baritius superba (Schaus, 1889)

Species of moth

Thysanoprymna superba is a moth of the family Erebidae. It was described by William Schaus in 1889. It is found in Mexico, Costa Rica and Venezuela.
