= Bulbophyllum simulacrum =

Scientific classification
- Kingdom: Plantae
- Clade: Tracheophytes
- Clade: Angiosperms
- Clade: Monocots
- Order: Asparagales
- Family: Orchidaceae
- Subfamily: Epidendroideae
- Genus: Bulbophyllum
- Species: B. simulacrum

Binomial name
- Bulbophyllum simulacrum Schltr.

Orchid species found in the Philippines

Bulbophyllum simulacrum is a species of orchid in the genus Bulbophyllum. It can be found in the Philippines.
