= Bulbophyllum stelis =

Scientific classification
- Kingdom: Plantae
- Clade: Tracheophytes
- Clade: Angiosperms
- Clade: Monocots
- Order: Asparagales
- Family: Orchidaceae
- Subfamily: Epidendroideae
- Genus: Bulbophyllum
- Species: B. stelis

Binomial name
- Bulbophyllum stelis J. J. Sm.

Species of orchid

Bulbophyllum stelis is a species of orchid in the genus Bulbophyllum. It is also known as the Parasitic Bulbophyllum. It is found in western Sumatra and Java, typically at elevations around 300 meters. It blooms in the fall.
