= Thysanoprymna cepiana =

Scientific classification
- Domain: Eukaryota
- Kingdom: Animalia
- Phylum: Arthropoda
- Class: Insecta
- Order: Lepidoptera
- Superfamily: Noctuoidea
- Family: Erebidae
- Subfamily: Arctiinae
- Genus: Thysanoprymna
- Species: T. cepiana

Binomial name
- Thysanoprymna cepiana H. Druce, 1893

Synonyms
- Baritius cepiana (H. Druce, 1893)

Species of moth

Thysanoprymna cepiana is a moth of the family Erebidae. It was described by Herbert Druce in 1893. It is found in Venezuela.
