= Bulbophyllum odoratum =

Scientific classification
- Kingdom: Plantae
- Clade: Tracheophytes
- Clade: Angiosperms
- Clade: Monocots
- Order: Asparagales
- Family: Orchidaceae
- Subfamily: Epidendroideae
- Genus: Bulbophyllum
- Species: B. odoratum

Binomial name
- Bulbophyllum odoratum (Blume) Lindl.

Synonyms
- Diphyes odorata Blume 1825; Phyllorkis odorata (Blume) Kuntze 1891; Bulbophyllum braccatum Rchb.f. 1877; Bulbophyllum brookesii Ridl. 1908; Bulbophyllum deceptum Ames 1915; Bulbophyllum elatius Ridl. 1896; Bulbophyllum hortense J.J.Sm. 1913; Bulbophyllum hortensoides Ames 1920; Bulbophyllum mindanaense Ames 1912; Bulbophyllum niveum (J.J.Sm.) J.J.Sm. 1912; Bulbophyllum odoratum var. grandiflorum J.J.Sm. 1919; Bulbophyllum odoratum var. niveum J.J.Sm. 1905; Bulbophyllum odoratum var. obtusisepalum J.J.Sm. 1945; Bulbophyllum odoratum var. polyarachne (Ridl.) J.J.Sm. 1945; Bulbophyllum pangerangi Rchb.f. 1857; Bulbophyllum polyarachne Ridl. 1917; Bulbophyllum steffensii Schltr. 1925; Bulbophyllum subverticillatum Ridl. 1925; Bulbophyllum supervacaneum Kraenzl. 1929; Bulbophyllum tylophorum Schltr. 1911

Species of orchid

Bulbophyllum odoratum is a species of orchid in the genus Bulbophyllum.

Plants are found growing in Malaysia, Sumatra, Java, Lesser Borneo, Sulawesi, Sunda Island, the Moluccas and the Philippines in lowlands forest near rivers at elevations of 900–2,400 metres (3,000–7,900 ft).
