= Baritius flavescens =

Scientific classification
- Domain: Eukaryota
- Kingdom: Animalia
- Phylum: Arthropoda
- Class: Insecta
- Order: Lepidoptera
- Superfamily: Noctuoidea
- Family: Erebidae
- Subfamily: Arctiinae
- Genus: Baritius
- Species: B. flavescens

Binomial name
- Baritius flavescens Rothschild, 1909

Species of moth

Baritius flavescens is a moth of the family Erebidae first described by Walter Rothschild in 1909. It is found in Brazil.
