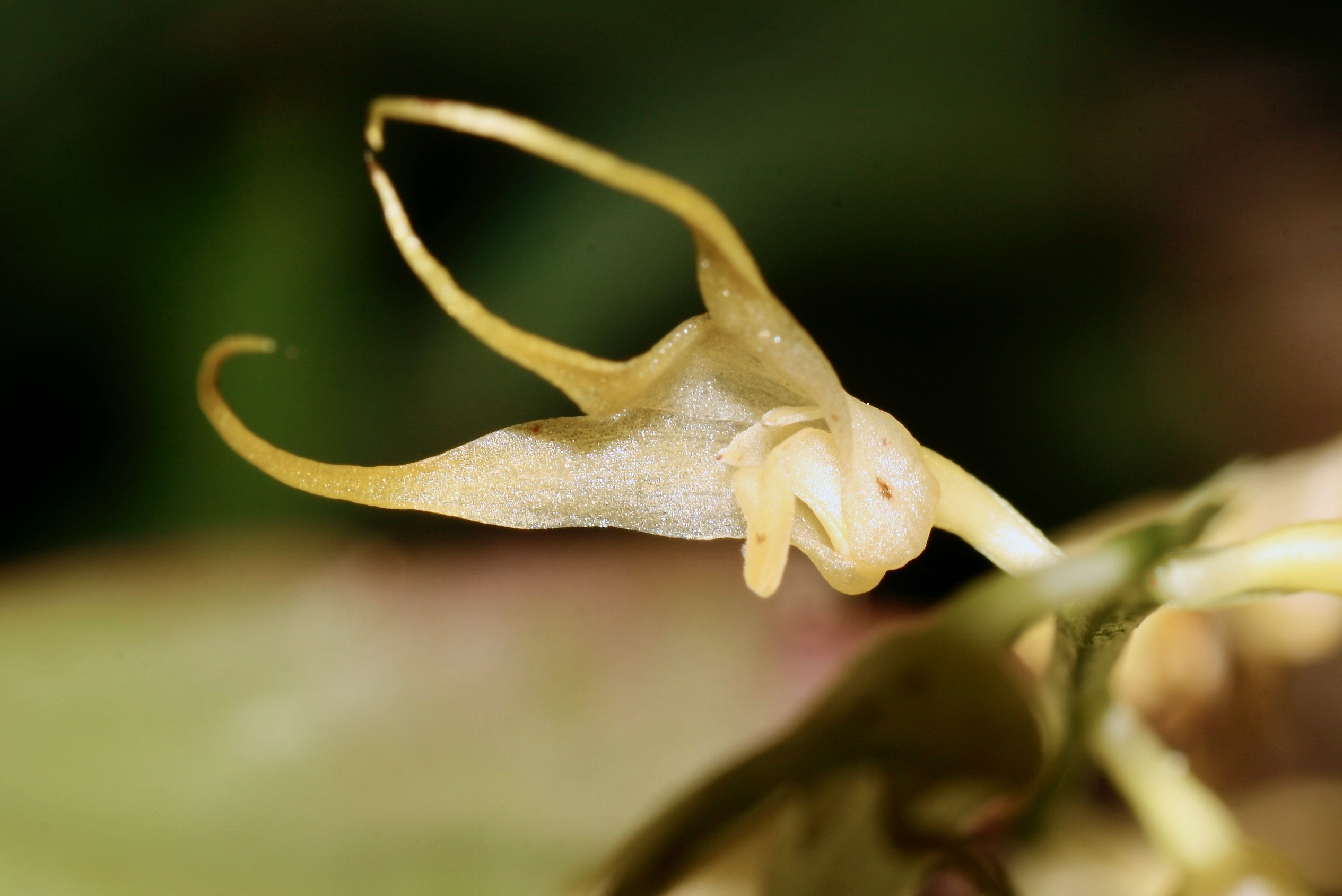
- Bulbophyllum flavescens (Orchidaceae)

Scientific classification
- Kingdom: Plantae
- Clade: Tracheophytes
- Clade: Angiosperms
- Clade: Monocots
- Order: Asparagales
- Family: Orchidaceae
- Subfamily: Epidendroideae
- Genus: Bulbophyllum
- Species: B. flavescens

Binomial name
- Bulbophyllum flavescens (Blume) Lindl. 1830

Synonyms
- Diphyes flavescens Blume 1825; Phyllorkis flavescens (Blume) Kuntze 1891; Bulbophyllum adenopetalum Lindl. 1842; Bulbophyllum barrinum Ridl. 1912; Bulbophyllum exiliscapum J.J.Sm. 1927; Bulbophyllum flavescens var. temelense J.J.Sm. 1931; Bulbophyllum lanceolatum Ames & C.Schweinf. 1920; Bulbophyllum montigenum Ridl. 1894; Bulbophyllum puberulum Ridl. 1896; Bulbophyllum ramosii Ames 1912; Phyllorkis adenopetala (Lindl.) Kuntze 1891

= Bulbophyllum flavescens =

Species of orchid

Bulbophyllum flavescens is a species of orchid in the genus Bulbophyllum found in Borneo, Jawa, Malaya, Philippines, Sumatera.
