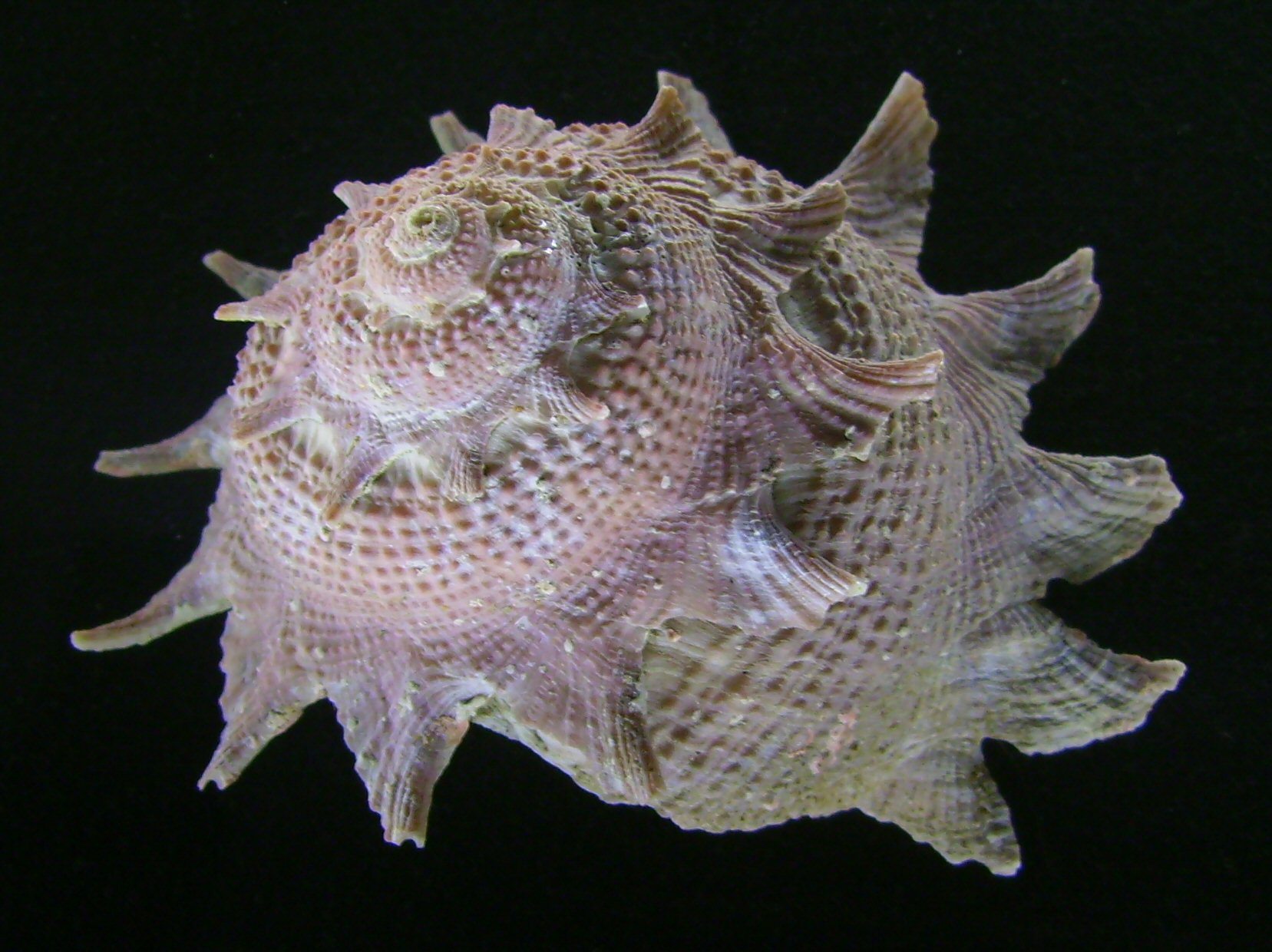
- a shell of Astraea heliotropium

Scientific classification
- Kingdom: Animalia
- Phylum: Mollusca
- Class: Gastropoda
- Subclass: Vetigastropoda
- Order: Trochida
- Superfamily: Trochoidea
- Family: Turbinidae
- Genus: Astraea; Röding, 1798

Type species
- Trochus imperialis Gmelin, 1791

Synonyms
- List: † Astraea (Vitiastraea) Ladd, 1966 alternative representation; Astralium (Imperator) Montfort, 1810 junior subjective synonym; Astrea Link, 1807 (misspelling); Canthorbis Swainson, 1840; Imperator Montfort, 1810

= Astraea (gastropod) =

Astraea Temporal range: Paleocene - Recent

Genus of gastropods

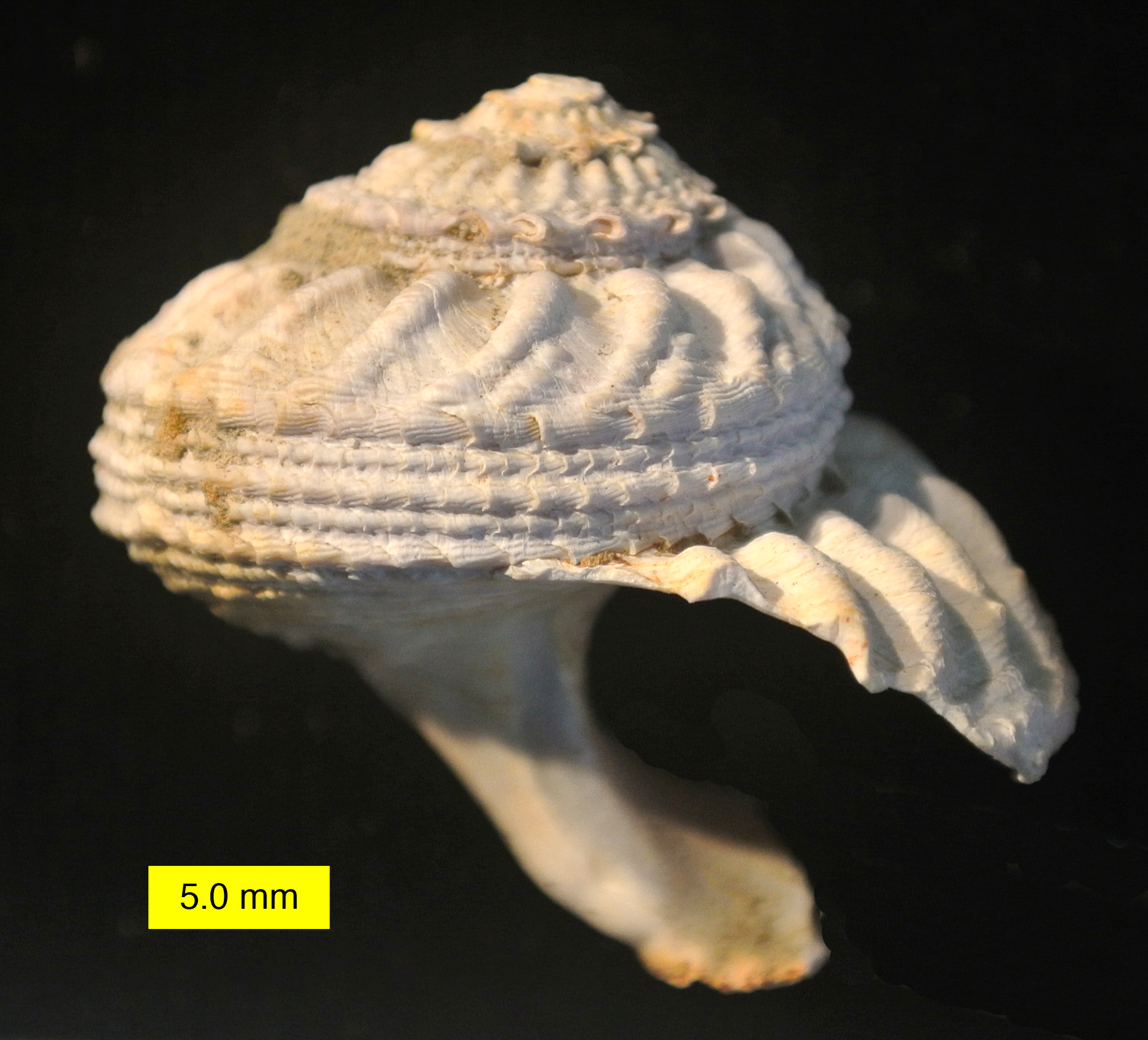
Fossil Bolma rugosa with signs of crab predation; Pliocene of Cyprus.

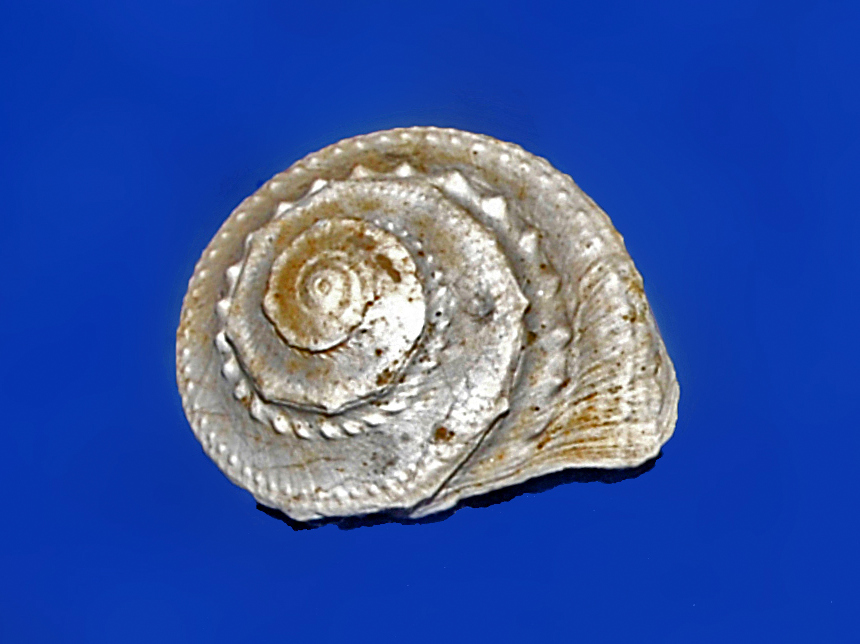
Fossil shell of Astraea fimbriata from Pliocene of Italy.

Astraea is a genus of medium to large sea snails, marine gastropod mollusks in the family Turbinidae, the turban snails.

== Etymology ==
The Latin genus Astraea means star, with reference to the star-shape of these snails, also commonly called star shells.

== Description ==
Shells of species within this genus can reach a size of about 60 millimetres (2.4 in). They have the appearance of a smooth conical shell. The outer edges of the coiled whorls are quite flattened, with prominent axial sculpture. Below widely, it is umbilicate and concave.

== Species ==
Extant species within this genus include:

- Astraea heliotropium (Martyn, 1784)

== Fossil records ==
This genus is known in the fossil records from the Paleocene to the Quaternary (age range: from 61.7 to 0.0 million years ago). Fossils of species within this genus have been found in the sediments of Europe, Australia, United States, Japan, Venezuela, Colombia and Brazil.

== Species ==
Extinct species within this genus include:

- †Astraea (Liotiastralium) venezuelana Weisbord 1962
- †Astraea (Pomaulax) gradata Grant and Gale 1931
- †Astraea (Pomaulax) morani Loel and Corey 1932
- †Astraea (Vitiastraea) holmesi Ladd 1966
- † Astraea bicarinata Suter, 1917
- †Astraea fimbriata Borson 1821
- † Astraea granifer (K. Martin, 1884)
- † Astraea hickmanae Kiel & Bandel, 2002
- † Astraea holmesi Ladd, 1966
- † Astraea hudsoniana (R. M. Johnston, 1888)
- † Astraea pseudomodesta Nomura, 1935
- † Astraea stellare Gmelin 1791
- † Astraea stirps Laws, 1932
- †Astraea tentoriiformis Jonas, 1844

Species brought into synonymy

- †Astraea (Australium) rhodestoma Lamarck 1822: synonym of Astralium rhodostomum (Lamarck, 1822)
- Astraea americana (Gmelin, 1791): synonym of Lithopoma americanum (Gmelin, 1791)
- Astraea andersoni (Smith, 1902): synonym of Bolma andersoni (Smith, 1902)
- Astraea babelis (P. Fischer, 1874): synonym of Uvanilla babelis (P. Fischer, 1874)
- Astraea brevispina (Lamarck, 1822): synonym of Lithopoma brevispina (Lamarck, 1822)
- Astraea buschii (Philippi, 1844): synonym of Uvanilla buschii (Philippi, 1844)
- Astraea calcar (Linnaeus, 1758): synonym of Astralium calcar (Linnaeus, 1758)
- Astraea cookii (Gmelin, 1791): synonym of Cookia sulcata (Lightfoot, 1786)
- Astraea cubanum Philippi, 1849: synonym of Lithopoma tectum (Lightfoot, 1786)
- Astraea danieli Alf & Kreipl, 2006: synonym of Astralium danieli (Alf & Kreipl, 2006)
- Astraea dominicana A. H. Verrill, 1950: synonym of Lithopoma tuber (Linnaeus, 1758)
- Astraea gilchristi (G. B. Sowerby III, 1903): synonym of Bolma bathyraphis (E. A. Smith, 1899)
- Astraea heimburgi (Dunker, 1882): synonym of Astralium heimburgi (Dunker, 1882)
- Astraea hokianga Laws, 1948: synonym of Bembicium hokianga (Laws, 1948)
- Astraea imbricata (Gmelin, 1791): synonym of Lithopoma tectum (Lightfoot, 1786)
- Astraea imbricatum Gmelin, 1791: synonym of Lithopoma tectum (Lightfoot, 1786)
- Astraea jacquelineae Marche-Marchad, 1957: synonym of Bolma jacquelineae (Marche-Marchad, 1957)
- Astraea johnstoni (Odhner, 1923): synonym of Bolma johnstoni (Odhner, 1923)
- Astraea lapidifera Röding, 1798: synonym of Xenophora (Xenophora) conchyliophora (Born, 1780)
- Astraea latispina (Philippi, 1844): synonym of Astralium latispina (Philippi, 1844)
- Astraea longispina Lamarck, 1822: synonym of Lithopoma phoebium longispina (Lamarck, 1822)
- Astraea milloni B. Salvat, F. Salvat & Richard, 1973: synonym of Astralium milloni (B. Salvat, F. Salvat & Richard, 1973)
- Astraea olfersii (Philippi, 1846): synonym of Lithopoma americanum (Gmelin, 1791)
- Astraea olivacea (W. Wood, 1828): synonym of Uvanilla olivacea (W. Wood, 1828)
- Astraea papillatum Potiez & Michaud, 1838: synonym of Lithopoma tectum (Lightfoot, 1786)
- Astraea persica Dall, 1907: synonym of Bolma persica (Dall, 1907)
- Astraea petrothauma Berry, 1940: synonym of Megastraea turbanica (Dall, 1910)
- Astraea phoebia Röding, 1798: synonym of Lithopoma phoebium (Röding, 1798)
- Astraea polaris Röding, 1798: synonym of Stellaria solaris (Linnaeus, 1764)
- Astraea rhodostoma Lamarck, 1822: synonym of Astralium rhodostomum (Lamarck, 1822)
- Astraea rugosa (Linnaeus, 1767): synonym of Bolma rugosa (Linnaeus, 1767)
- Astraea rupicollina Stohler, 1959: synonym of Megastraea turbanica (Dall, 1910)
- Astraea semicostata (Kiener, 1850): synonym of Astralium semicostatum (Kiener, 1850)
- Astraea sirius Hedley, C., 1923: synonym of Astralium tentoriiforme (Jonas, 1845)
- Astraea spirata (Dall, 1911): synonym of Pomaulax spiratus (Dall, 1911)
- Astraea sulcata (Martyn, 1784): synonym of Cookia sulcata (Lightfoot, 1786)
- Astraea tayloriana (E. A. Smith, 1880): synonym of Bolma tayloriana (E. A. Smith, 1880)
- Astraea tectum Lightfoot, 1786: synonym of Lithopoma tectum (Lightfoot, 1786)
- Astraea tuber (Linnaeus, 1758): synonym of Lithopoma tuber (Linnaeus, 1758)
- Astraea tuberosum: synonym of Astralium rhodostomum (Lamarck, 1822)
- Astraea undosa (Wood, 1828): synonym for Lithopoma undosum (Wood, 1828)
- Astraea unguis (Wood, 1828): synonym of Uvanilla unguis (W. Wood, 1828)
- Astraea venezuelensis Flores & Caceres, 1984: synonym of Lithopoma tuber (Linnaeus, 1758)
