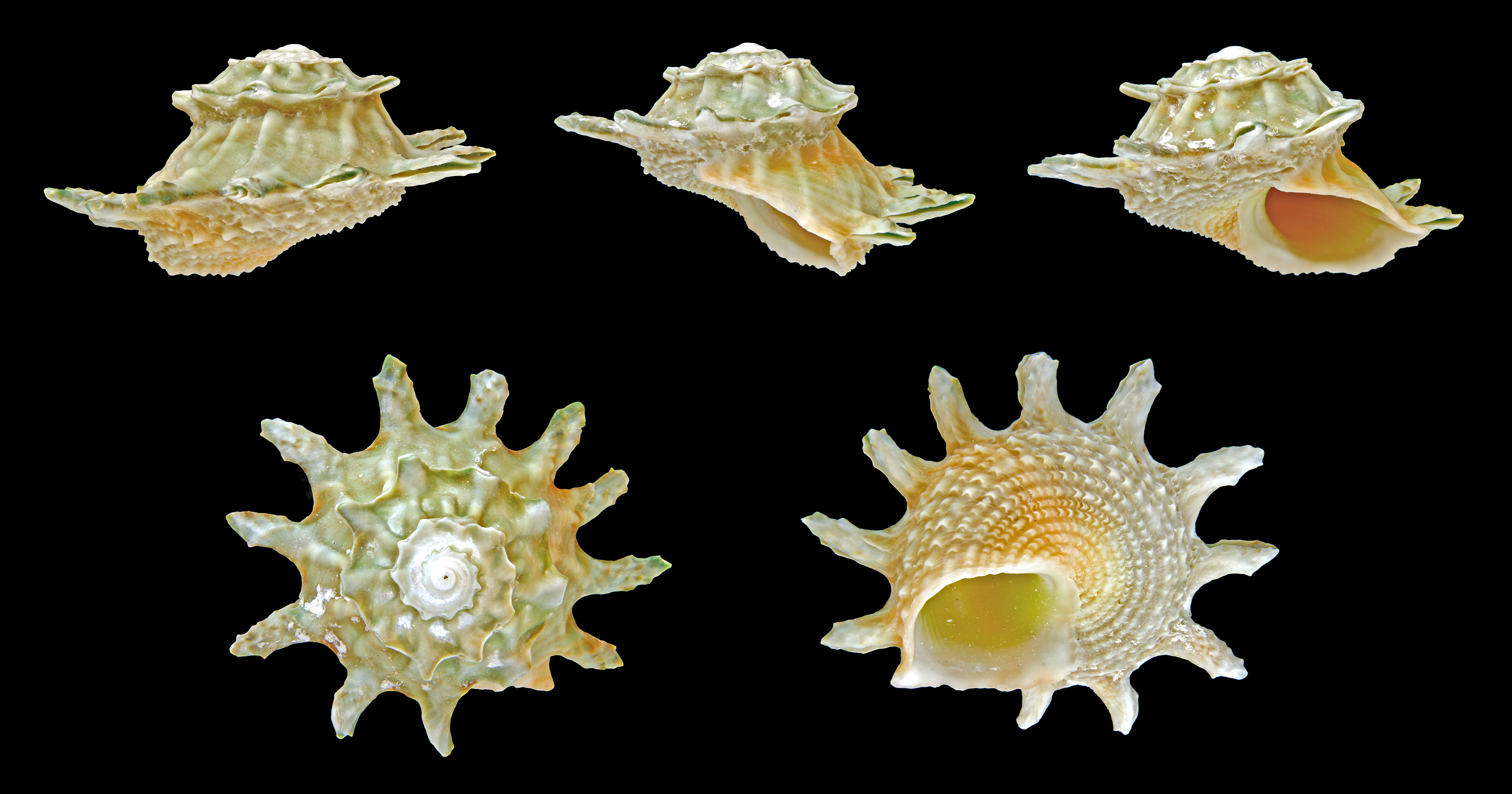
- Several views of Astralium calcar

Scientific classification
- Kingdom: Animalia
- Phylum: Mollusca
- Class: Gastropoda
- Subclass: Vetigastropoda
- Order: Trochida
- Superfamily: Trochoidea
- Family: Turbinidae
- Genus: Astralium; Link, 1807

Type species
- Turbo calcar Linnaeus, 1758

Synonyms
- Astraea (Astralium) Link, 1807; Astraea (Calcar) Montfort, 1810; Astraea (Cyclocantha) Swainson, 1840; Astralium (Calcar) Montfort, 1810; Astralium (Cyclocantha) Swainson, 1840; Astralium (Distellifer) Iredale, 1937 superseded combination; Astralium (Foliastralium) T. Habe & Okutani, 1980 · alternative representation; Calcar Montfort, 1810; Cyclocantha Swainson, 1840; Distellifer Iredale, 1937; Foliastralium Habe & Okutani, 1980; Macropelmus Gistel, 1848 (Unnecessary substitute name for Calcar Montfort, 1810); Okinawastraea Habe & Okutani, 1981; Pagocalcar Iredale, 1937; Rugastella Iredale, 1937; Stella P. Fischer, 1885; Trochus (Calcar) Montfort, 1810 superseded rank; Turbo (Calcar) Montfort, 1810

= Astralium =

Genus of gastropods

Astralium, common name star snails, is a genus of sea snails, marine gastropod mollusks in the family Turbinidae, the turban snails and star snails.

== Description ==
In Astralium a very rapidly enlarging whorl starts from the multispiral nucleus, forming far the greater portion of the operculum, and usually leaving a pit at the starting point.

== Distribution ==
This marine genus has a wide distribution ranging from the Eastern Indian Ocean to China and Japan, the Philippines, Indonesia, East India, the Maldives and Australia (New South Wales, Northern Territory, Queensland, South Australia, Tasmania, Victoria, Western Australia).

== Species ==
According to the World Register of Marine Species (WoRMS), the following species are included within the genus Astralium :

- † Astralium aquitanicum Benoist, 1874
- Astralium asteriscus (Reeve, 1843)
- Astralium bichlinhorum Thach, 2023
- † Astralium biserialis (K. Martin, 1884)
- Astralium calcar (Linnaeus, 1758)
- Astralium confragosum (Gould, 1851)
- Astralium danieli (Alf & Kreipl, 2006)
- Astralium dekkeri (Thach, 2018)
- † Astralium ena Tomida, Inoue & Kase, 2022 †
- † Astralium eniwetokense (Ladd, 1966) †
- † Astralium girondinum (A. d'Orbigny, 1842)
- Astralium haematragum (Menke, 1829)
- † Astralium hayakawai (Kanno, 1958)
- Astralium heimburgi (Dunker, 1882)
- Astralium lapillus Reeve, 1863
- Astralium latispina (Philippi, 1844)
- † Astralium loochooensis (MacNeil, 1961)
- Astralium milloni (B. Salvat, F. Salvat & Richard, 1973)
- Astralium nakamineae (Habe & Okutani, 1981)
- Astralium okamotoi Kuroda & Habe, 1961
- Astralium pileolum (Reeve, 1842)
- † Astralium proprium (Hatai & Kotaka, 1952)
- Astralium provisorium Schepman, 1908
- Astralium rhodostomum (Lamarck, 1822)
- Astralium rotularium (Lamarck, 1822)
- Astralium saturnum Chino, 1999
- Astralium semicostatum (Kiener, 1850)
- Astralium stellare (Gmelin, 1791)
- Astralium tentoriiforme (Jonas, 1845)
- Astralium tentorium (Thiele, 1930)
- † Astralium verbeeki Icke, 1907
- Astralium wallisi (Iredale, 1937)
- † Astralium waluense (Ladd, 1966)
- Astralium yamamurae Habe & Kosuge, 1966

Another number of species are also mentioned in the Indo-Pacific Molluscan Database :

- Astralium turcicus Reeve, 1848

== Synonyms ==
- Astralium abyssorum Schepman, 1908: synonym of Bolma henica (Watson, 1885)
- Astralium americanum (Gmelin, 1791): synonym of Lithopoma americanum (Gmelin, 1791)
- Astralium andersoni E.A. Smith, 1902: synonym of Bolma andersoni (E. A. Smith, 1902)
- Astralium aureolum Hedley, 1907: synonym of Bolma aureola (Hedley, 1907)
- Astralium aureum (Jonas, 1844): synonym of Bellastraea aurea (Jonas, 1844)
- Astralium bathyrhaphe Smith, 1899: synonym of Bolma bathyraphis (E. A. Smith, 1899)
- Astralium brevispina (Lamarck, 1822): synonym of Lithopoma brevispina (Lamarck, 1822)
- Astralium cepoides E.A. Smith, 1880: synonym of Turbo cepoides E.A. Smith, 1880
- Astralium deplanatum Link, H.F., 1807: synonym of Lithopoma phoebium (Röding, 1798)
- Astralium fimbriatum Tryon, 1888: synonym of Bellastraea squamifera (Iredale, 1924)
- † Astralium flindersi Tenison Woods, 1877: synonym of † Bolma flindersi (Tenison Woods, 1877) (superseded combination)
- Astralium gilchristi G.B. Sowerby III, 1903: synonym of Bolma bathyraphis (E. A. Smith, 1899)
- Astralium guadeloupense Crosse, H., 1865: synonym of Lithopoma tectum (Lightfoot, 1786)
- Astralium johnstoni Odhner, 1923: synonym of Bolma johnstoni (Odhner, 1923)
- Astralium longispinum (Lamarck, 1822): synonym of Lithopoma phoebium (Röding, 1798) (junior subjective synonym)
- Astralium mactanense Habe & Okutani, 1980: synonym of Astralium lapillus Reeve, 1863
- Astralium moniliferum Hedley & Willey, 1896: synonym of Guildfordia monilifera (Hedley & Willey, 1896)
- Astralium ornatissimum Tenison Woods, 1877: synonym of † Bolma crassigranosa (Tenison Woods, 1877)
- Astralium phoebium (Röding, 1798): synonym of Lithopoma phoebium (Röding, 1798)
- Astralium plicatospinosum Pilsbry, 1889: synonym of Astralium confragosum (Gould, 1851)
- Astralium pyramidale W. H. Webster, 1905: synonym of Cookia sulcata ([Lightfoot], 1786) (junior subjective synonym)
- Astralium roseobasis Kreipl & Dekker, 2003: synonym of Astralium provisorium (Schepman, 1903)
- Astralium rugosum (Linnaeus, 1767): synonym of Bolma rugosa (Linnaeus, 1767) (superseded combination)
- Astralium rutidoloma (Tate, 1893) synonym of Bellastraea rutidoloma (Tate, 1893)
- Astralium semicostatum (P. Fischer, 1875): synonym of Astralium semicostatum (Kiener, 1850)
- Astralium squamiferum (Koch, 1844): synonym of Bellastraea squamifera (Koch, 1844)
- Astralium tayloriana Odhner, 1923: synonym of Bolma tayloriana (E. A. Smith, 1880)
- Astralium titania Röding, P.F., 1798: synonym of Lithopoma phoebium (Röding, 1798)
- Astralium triumphans (Philippi, 1841): synonym of Guildfordia triumphans (Philippi, 1841)
- Astralium tuberosum (Philippi): synonym of Astralium rhodostomum (Lamarck, 1822)
- Astralium (Bolma) modestus var. girgyllus (Reeve, 1843): synonym of Bolma modesta (Reeve, 1843)
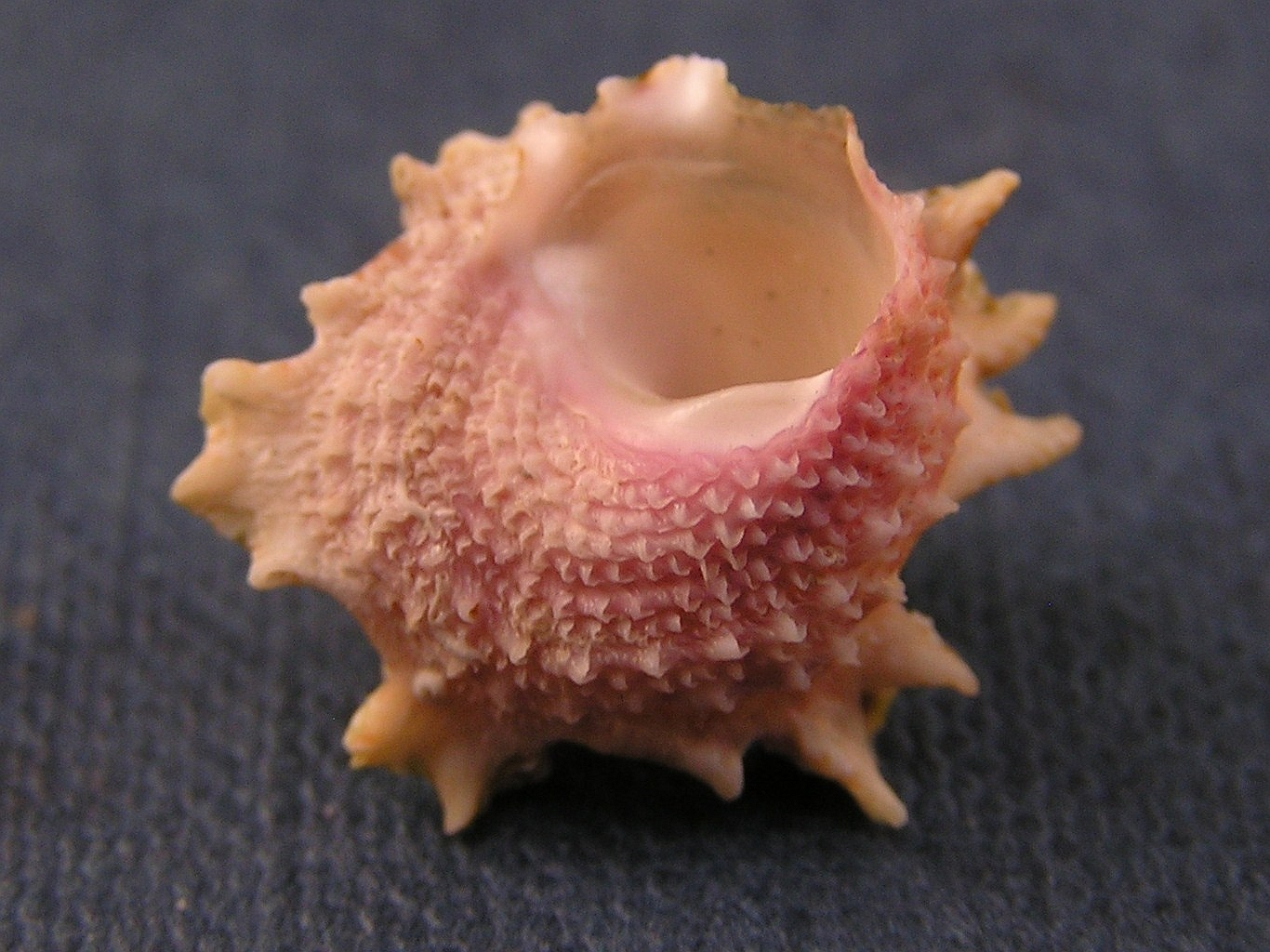
Astralium lapillus

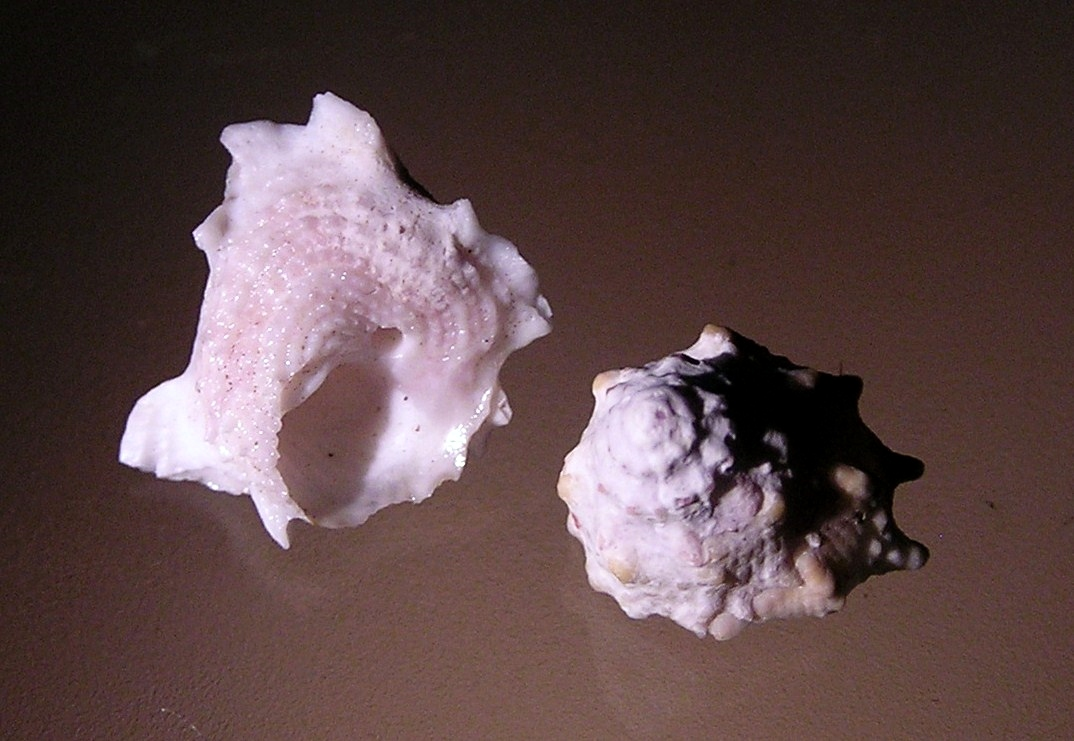
Astralium lapillus
