= Astralium wallisi =

Scientific classification
- Kingdom: Animalia
- Phylum: Mollusca
- Class: Gastropoda
- Subclass: Vetigastropoda
- Order: Trochida
- Family: Turbinidae
- Genus: Astralium
- Species: A. wallisi

Binomial name
- Astralium wallisi (Iredale, 1937)

Synonyms
- Distellifer wallisi Iredale, 1937 (original combination)

Species of gastropod

Astralium wallisi is a species of sea snail, a marine gastropod mollusk in the family Turbinidae, the turban snails.

This species is considered by the Australian Faunal Directory as a synonym of Astralium rhodostomum (Lamarck, 1822)

== Distribution ==
This species is endemic to Australia and was found on the Middleton Reef, a coral reef in the Tasman Sea.
