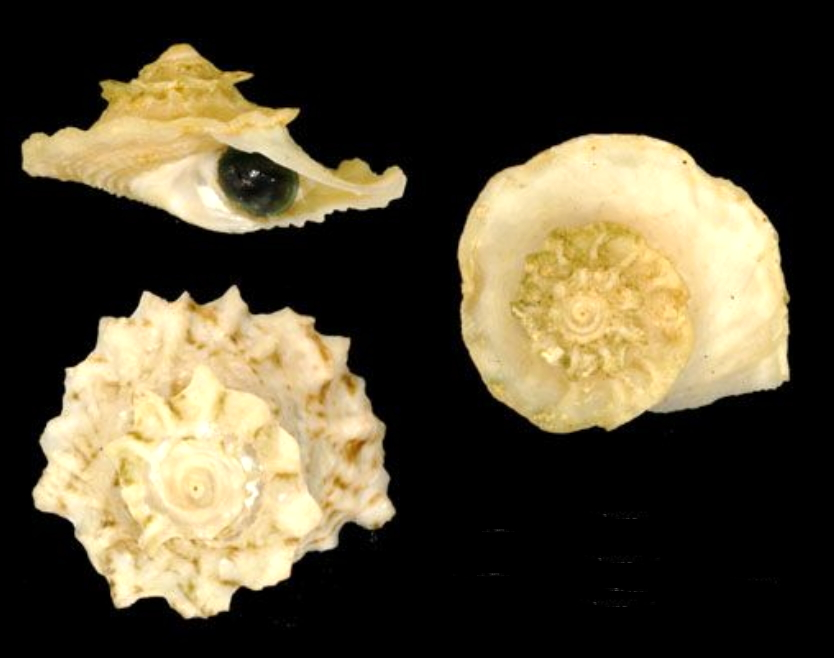
- Shell of Astralium pileolum (specimen at the Natural History Museum, Rotterdam)

Scientific classification
- Kingdom: Animalia
- Phylum: Mollusca
- Class: Gastropoda
- Subclass: Vetigastropoda
- Order: Trochida
- Family: Turbinidae
- Genus: Astralium
- Species: A. pileolum

Binomial name
- Astralium pileolum (Reeve, 1842)

Synonyms
- Trochus cucculatus Kiener, 1850; Trochus limbiferus Kiener, 1850; Trochus pileolum Reeve, 1842; Turbo pileolum Reeve, 1842 (original combination)

= Astralium pileolum =

Species of gastropod

Astralium pileolum, common name the cap trochis shell, is a species of sea snail, a marine gastropod mollusk in the family Turbinidae, the turban snails.

== Description ==
The size of the shell varies between 28 mm and 65 mm. The shell resembles the shell of Bellastraea squamifera (Iredale, 1924), with some differences. The shell is grayish white. The sculpture is obsolete above and nearly so below. The keel is very broad and thin.

== Distribution ==
This marine species is endemic to Australia and occurs off the Northern Territory, Queensland and Western Australia.
