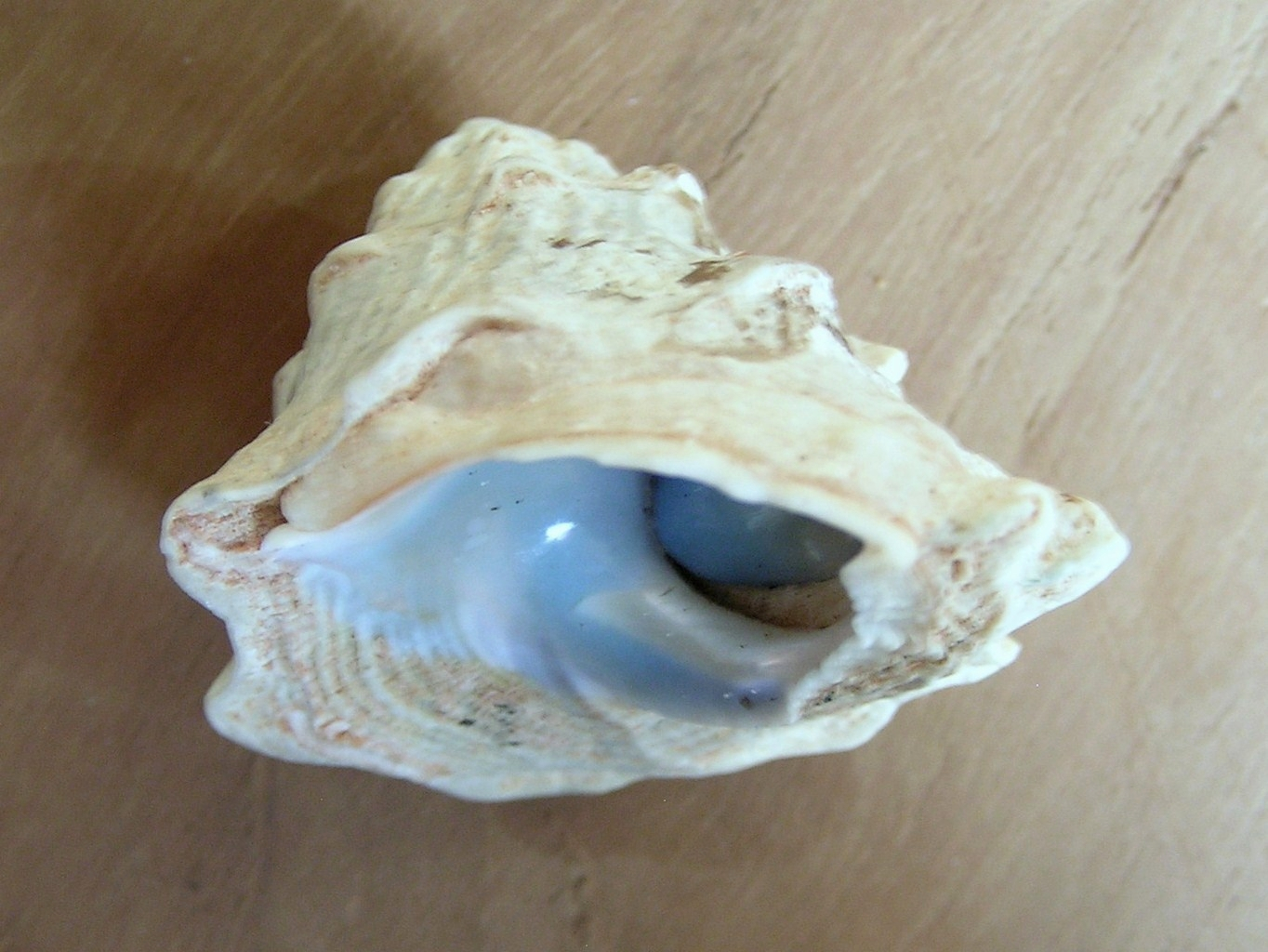
- Apertural view of a shell of Astralium stellare

Scientific classification
- Kingdom: Animalia
- Phylum: Mollusca
- Class: Gastropoda
- Subclass: Vetigastropoda
- Order: Trochida
- Family: Turbinidae
- Genus: Astralium
- Species: A. stellare

Binomial name
- Astralium stellare (Gmelin, 1791)

Synonyms
- Astraea (Astralium) stellare (Gmelin, 1791); Distellifer stellare Cotton, B.C. 1964; Turbo stellaris Gmelin, 1791 (original combination)

= Astralium stellare =

Species of gastropod

Astralium stellare, common name the blue-mouthed turban, is a species of sea snail, a marine gastropod mollusk in the family Turbinidae, the turban snails.

== Description ==
The size of the shell varies between 25 mm and 50 mm. The solid, imperforate shell has a conoid shape. It is more or less elevated. The 5-6 whorls are obliquely radiately costate, imbricately spinose at the periphery. The body whorl is carinated, carina with about ten long vaulted spines. The base of the shell contains about ten concentric squamose lirae. The white columella is oblique and is generally rosy margined, rarely bluish. The aperture is angulated.

The white or green operculum is granulose outside. The animal has no lateral filaments.

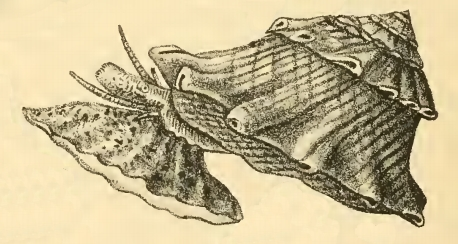
Drawing with animal and shell

== Distribution ==
This marine species occurs in the tropical Indo- West Pacific and off Australia (Northern Territory, Queensland, Western Australia)
