= Astralium dekkeri =

Scientific classification
- Kingdom: Animalia
- Phylum: Mollusca
- Class: Gastropoda
- Subclass: Vetigastropoda
- Order: Trochida
- Superfamily: Trochoidea
- Family: Turbinidae
- Genus: Astralium
- Species: A. dekkeri

Binomial name
- Astralium dekkeri Thach, 2018

Species of gastropod

Astralium dekkeri is a species of sea snail, a marine gastropod mollusk, in the family Turbinidae, the turban snails.
