= Astraea stirps =

Scientific classification
- Kingdom: Animalia
- Phylum: Mollusca
- Class: Gastropoda
- Subclass: Vetigastropoda
- Order: Trochida
- Superfamily: Trochoidea
- Family: Turbinidae
- Genus: Astraea
- Species: †A. stirps

Binomial name
- †Astraea stirps Laws, 1932

Extinct species of gastropod

Astraea stirps is an extinct species of sea snail, a marine gastropod mollusk, in the family Turbinidae, the turban snails.

== Distribution ==
This species occurred in New Zealand.
