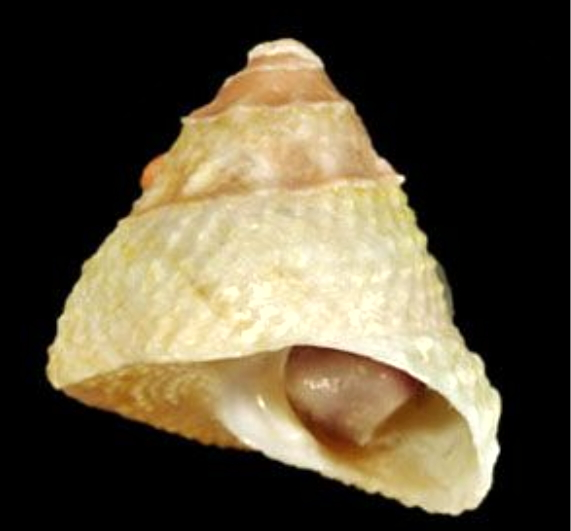
- Shell of Astralium okamotoi (specimen at the Natural History Museum, Rotterdam-)

Scientific classification
- Kingdom: Animalia
- Phylum: Mollusca
- Class: Gastropoda
- Subclass: Vetigastropoda
- Order: Trochida
- Family: Turbinidae
- Genus: Astralium
- Species: A. okamotoi

Binomial name
- Astralium okamotoi Kuroda & Habe, 1961

= Astralium okamotoi =

Species of gastropod

Astralium okamotoi is a species of sea snail, a marine gastropod mollusk in the family Turbinidae, the turban snails.

== Description ==
The length of the shell varies between 15 mm (0.59 in) and 40 mm (1.6 in).

== Distribution ==
This marine shell occurs off Japan and the Philippines.
