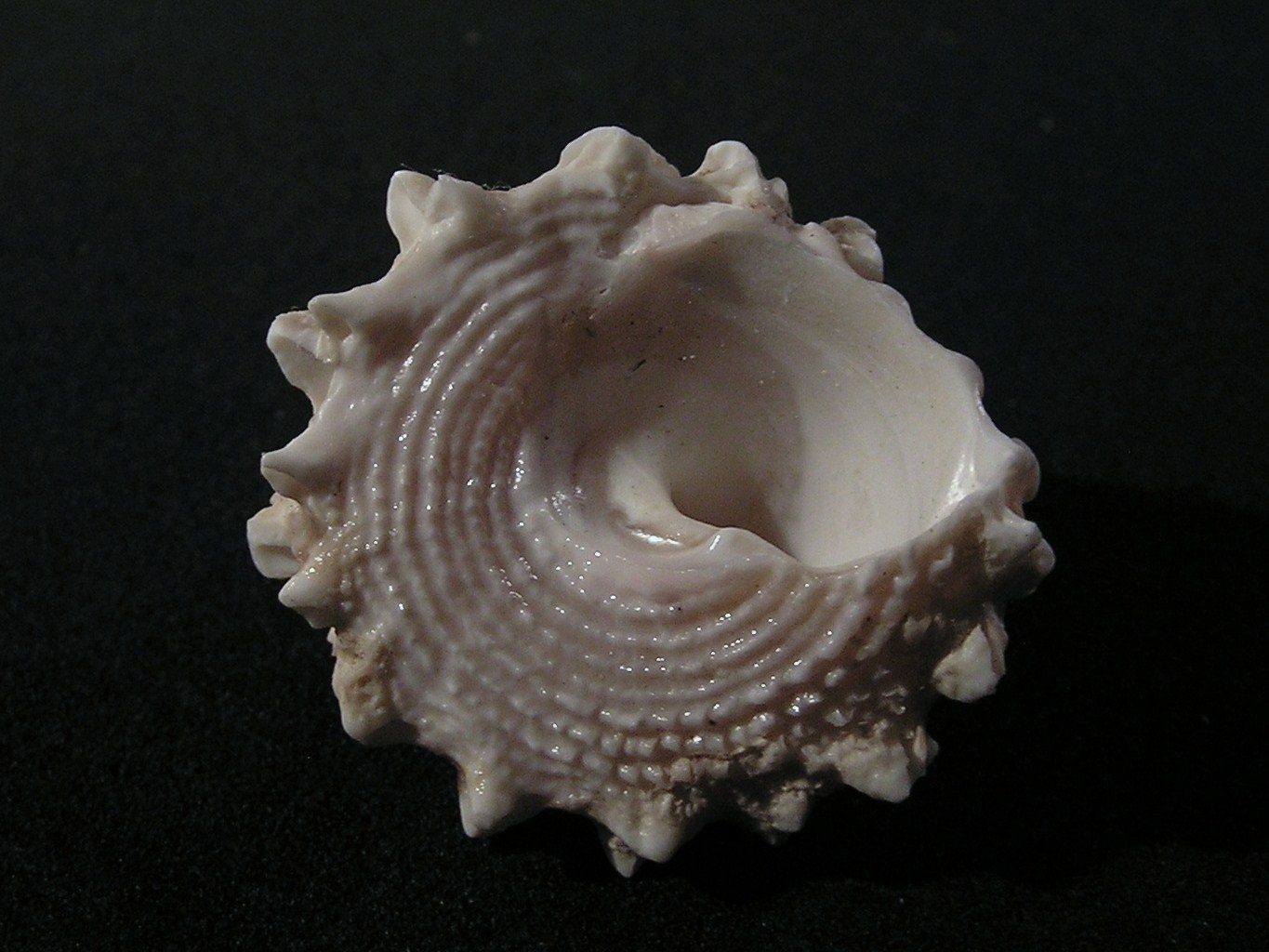
- Apertural view of Astralium haematragum

Scientific classification
- Kingdom: Animalia
- Phylum: Mollusca
- Class: Gastropoda
- Subclass: Vetigastropoda
- Order: Trochida
- Family: Turbinidae
- Genus: Astralium
- Species: A. haematragum

Binomial name
- Astralium haematragum (Menke, 1829)

Synonyms
- Trochus columellaris Philippi; Trochus gratus Philippi; Trochus haematragus Menke, 1829 (original combination)

= Astralium haematragum =

Species of gastropod

Astralium haematragum, common name the Pacific star shell, is a species of sea snail, a marine gastropod mollusk in the family Turbinidae, the turban snails.

== Description ==
The size of the shell varies between 15 mm and 25 mm. The imperforate shell is pale ashen. It has an elevated-conic shape with an acute apex. The seven whorls are planulate above, with radiating oblique folds, which are produced into short spines at the periphery. The body whorl is carinated, with ten to twelve spines in a single series. The base of the shell is plano-concave, concentrically squamose-lirate. The aperture is transverse, channelled at the carina. The columella is arcuate, purple or blue margined, dentate at its base.

== Distribution ==
This marine species occurs in the Southwest Pacific and off Japan.
