= Astralium nakamineae =

Scientific classification
- Kingdom: Animalia
- Phylum: Mollusca
- Class: Gastropoda
- Subclass: Vetigastropoda
- Order: Trochida
- Family: Turbinidae
- Genus: Astralium
- Species: A. nakamineae

Binomial name
- Astralium nakamineae (Habe & Okutani, 1981)

Synonyms
- Okinawastraea nakamineae Habe & Okutani, 1981

Species of gastropod

Astralium nakamineae is a species of sea snail, a marine gastropod mollusk in the family Turbinidae, the turban snails.

== Distribution ==
This marine species was found the Okinawa Islands.
