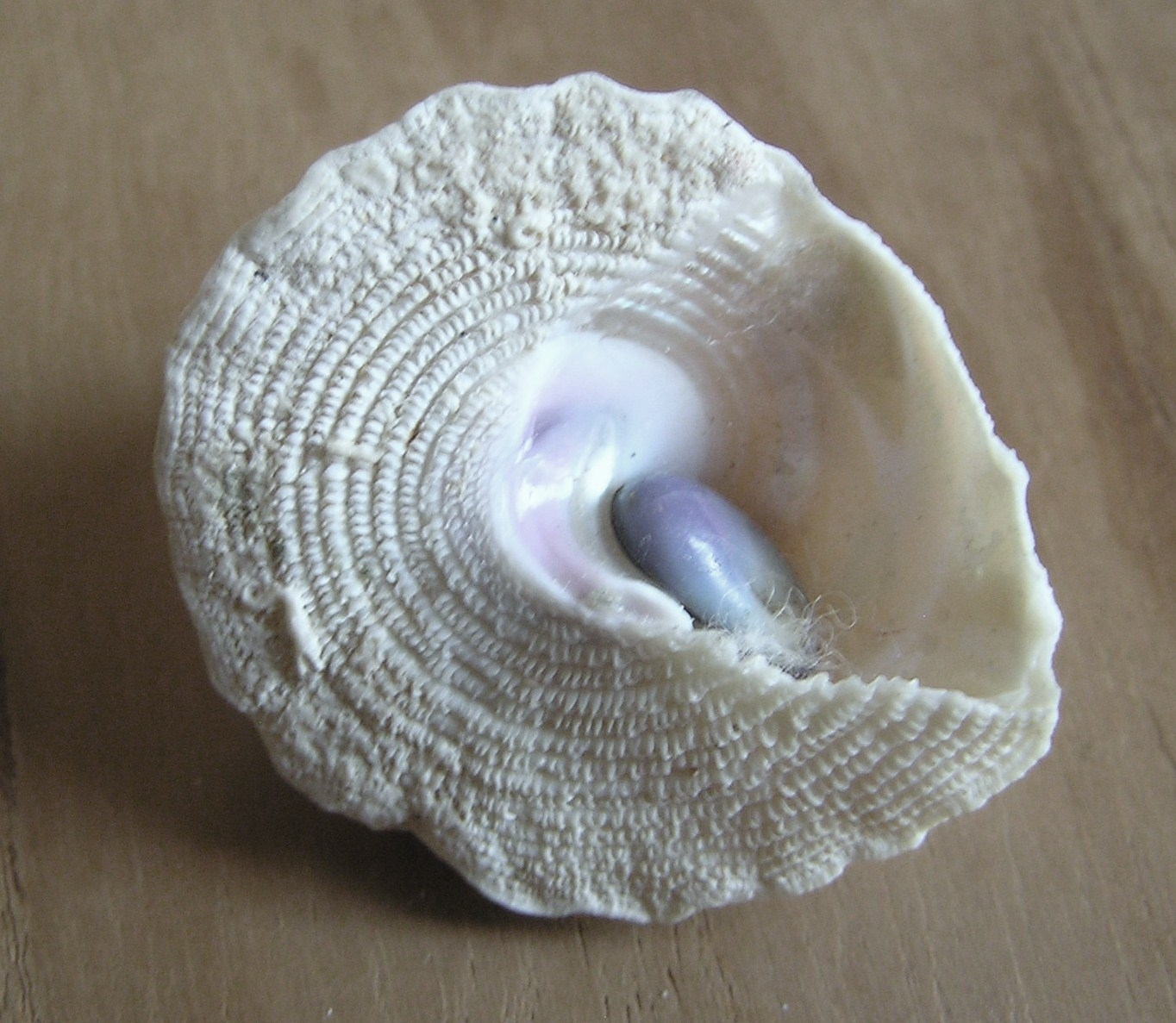
- Apertural view of a shell of Astralium tentorium

Scientific classification
- Kingdom: Animalia
- Phylum: Mollusca
- Class: Gastropoda
- Subclass: Vetigastropoda
- Order: Trochida
- Family: Turbinidae
- Genus: Astralium
- Species: A. tentorium

Binomial name
- Astralium tentorium (Thiele, 1930)

Synonyms
- Astraea tentorium Thiele, 1930

= Astralium tentorium =

Species of gastropod

Astralium tentorium is a species of sea snail, a marine gastropod mollusk in the family Turbinidae, the turban snails.

== Description ==
The size of the shell varies between 30 mm and 50 mm.

== Distribution ==
This marine species is endemic to Australia and occurs in the subtidal zone off Western Australia.
