= Astralium yamamurae =

Scientific classification
- Kingdom: Animalia
- Phylum: Mollusca
- Class: Gastropoda
- Subclass: Vetigastropoda
- Order: Trochida
- Family: Turbinidae
- Genus: Astralium
- Species: A. yamamurae

Binomial name
- Astralium yamamurae T. Habe & Kosuge, 1966

Synonyms
- Astralium (Distellifer) yamamurae T. Habe & Kosuge, 1966 superseded combination

Species of gastropod

Astralium yamamurae is a species of sea snail, a marine gastropod mollusk in the family Turbinidae, the turban snails.

== Distribution ==
This marine species occurs off the Philippines.
