= Tectariopsis henrici =

Scientific classification
- Kingdom: Animalia
- Phylum: Mollusca
- Class: Gastropoda
- Subclass: Vetigastropoda
- Order: Trochida
- Superfamily: Trochoidea
- Family: Turbinidae
- Genus: †Tectariopsis
- Species: †T. henrici

Binomial name
- †Tectariopsis henrici (Caillat, 1835)

Synonyms
- † Turbo henrici Caillat, 1835

Extinct species of gastropod

Tectariopsis henrici is an extinct species of sea snail, a marine gastropod mollusk, in the family Turbinidae.
