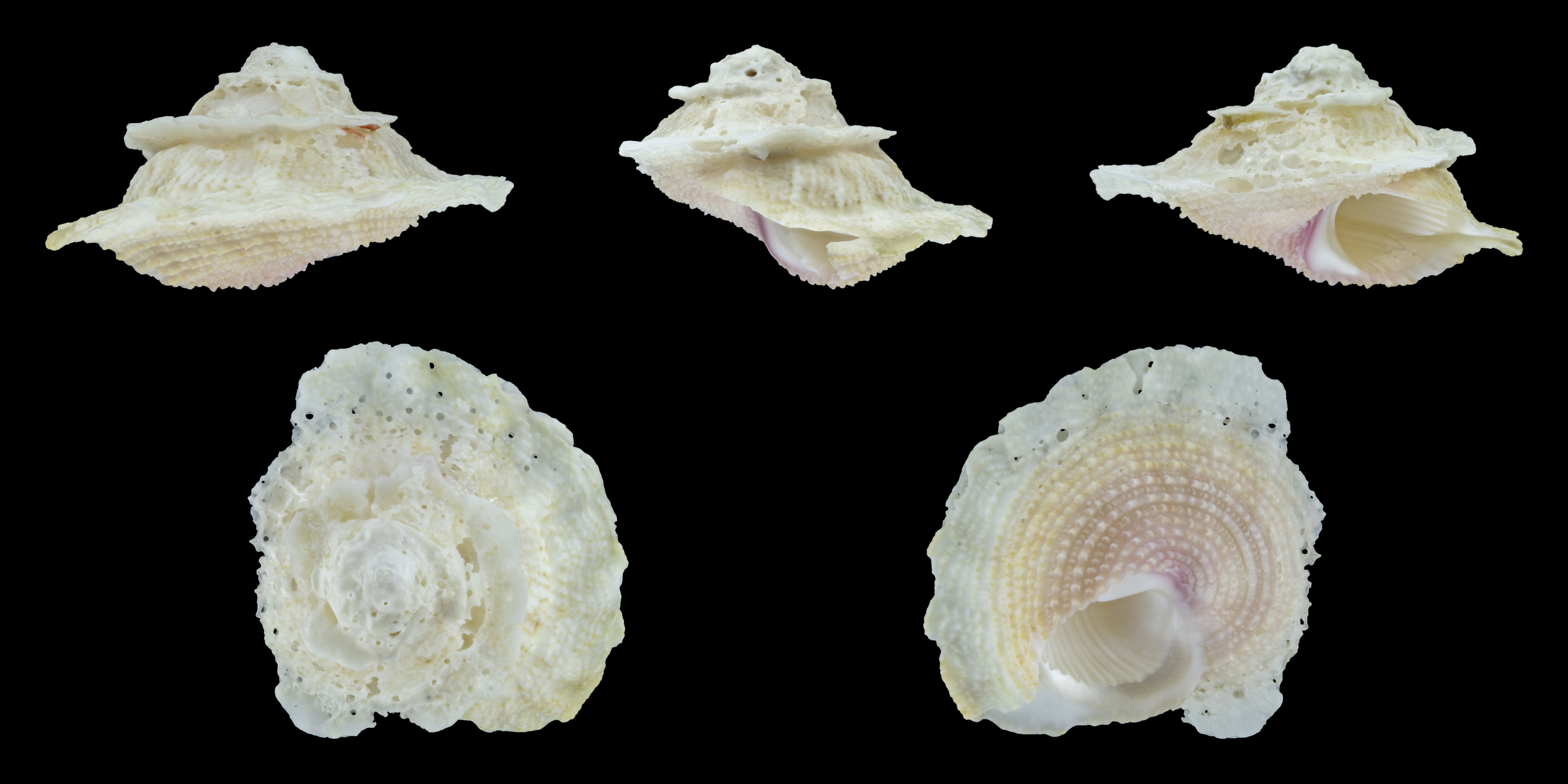
- Shell of Astralium saturnum

Scientific classification
- Kingdom: Animalia
- Phylum: Mollusca
- Class: Gastropoda
- Subclass: Vetigastropoda
- Order: Trochida
- Family: Turbinidae
- Genus: Astralium
- Species: A. saturnum

Binomial name
- Astralium saturnum Chino, 1999

= Astralium saturnum =

Species of gastropod

Astralium saturnum is a species of sea snail, a marine gastropod mollusk in the family Turbinidae, the turban snails.

== Description ==
The size of the shell varies from 15 mm to 35 mm.

== Distribution ==
This marine species occurs off the Philippines.
