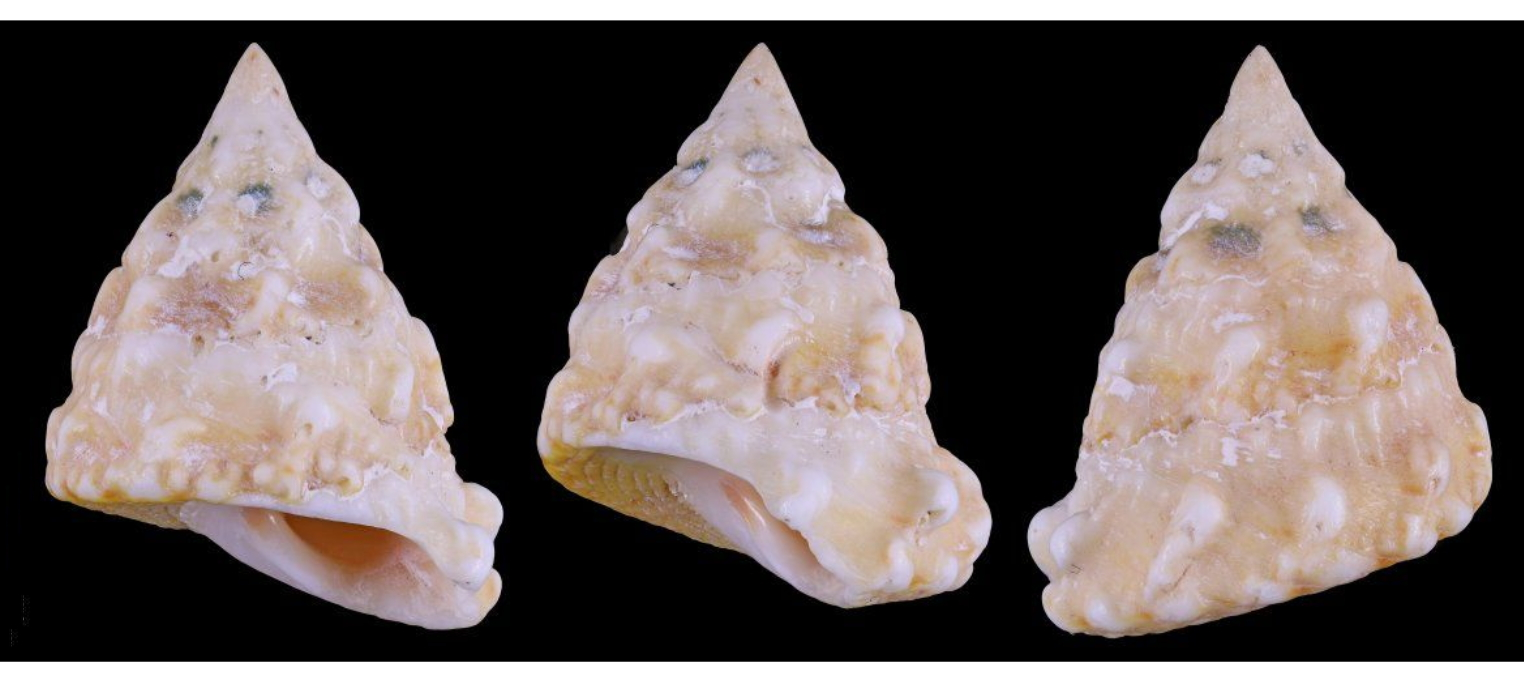
- Shell of Astralium bichlinhorum (holotype at MNHN, Paris)

Scientific classification
- Kingdom: Animalia
- Phylum: Mollusca
- Class: Gastropoda
- Subclass: Vetigastropoda
- Order: Trochida
- Family: Turbinidae
- Genus: Astralium
- Species: A. bichlinhorum

Binomial name
- Astralium bichlinhorum Thach, 2023

= Astralium bichlinhorum =

Species of gastropod

Astralium bichlinhorum is a species of sea snail, a marine gastropod mollusk in the family Turbinidae, the turban snails.

== Distribution ==
This marine species occurs off Vietnam.
