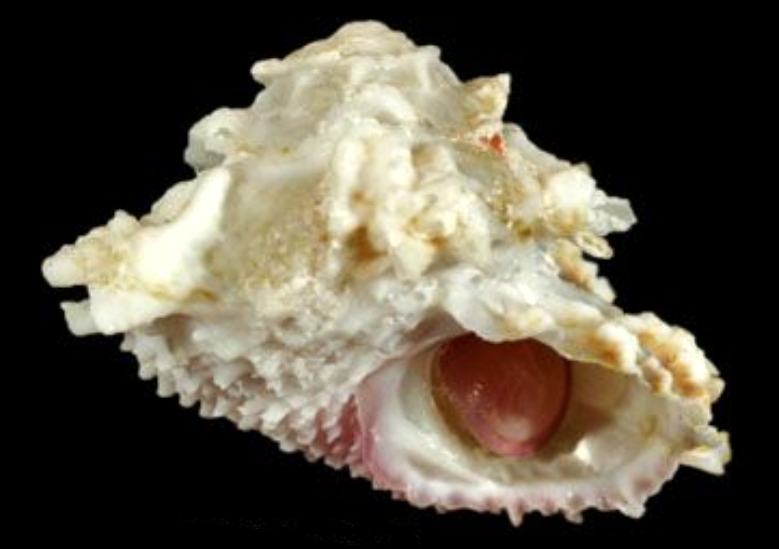
- Shell of Astralium lapillus (specimen at the Natural History Museum, Rotterdam)

Scientific classification
- Kingdom: Animalia
- Phylum: Mollusca
- Class: Gastropoda
- Subclass: Vetigastropoda
- Order: Trochida
- Family: Turbinidae
- Genus: Astralium
- Species: A. lapillus

Binomial name
- Astralium lapillus Reeve, 1863

Synonyms
- Astralium mactanense Habe & Okutani, 1980; Astralium (Cyclocantha) lapillus Reeve, 1863; Trochus lapillus Reeve, 1861 (original combination); Turbo (Pachypoma) lapillus (Reeve, 1861) superseded combination

= Astralium lapillus =

Species of gastropod

Astralium lapillus is a species of sea snail, a marine gastropod mollusk in the family Turbinidae, the turban snails.

== Description ==
The size of the shell varies between 14 mm and 25 mm. The imperforate shell has an obtusely turbinated shape. its color pattern is fulvous, tinged with red at the base. Most of the specimens are strongly covered with incrustations, which render it impossible to count the whorls. The whorls convexly slope next the suture, then become tumidly rounded. They are longitudinally rudely ribbed with ribs irregularly wrinkled and tuberculated. The convex base of the shell is very closely irregularly scaled, with indistinct spiral lirae and fine radiating lamellae. The margin is more or less lobed. The aperture has rose-colored margins. The interior of the aperture is grooved at some distance from the margin; only the groove corresponding to the keel, reaches the outer margin. The operculum is externally very convex, with close-set granules, the margin is deep violet, especially the columellar one.

== Distribution ==
This marine species occurs off the Philippines and Fiji.
