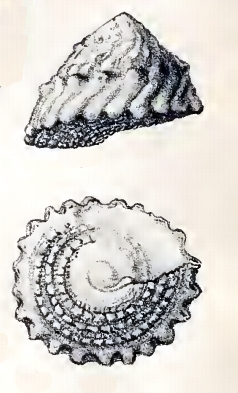
- Drawing with two views of a shell of Astralium confragosum

Scientific classification
- Kingdom: Animalia
- Phylum: Mollusca
- Class: Gastropoda
- Subclass: Vetigastropoda
- Order: Trochida
- Family: Turbinidae
- Genus: Astralium
- Species: A. confragosum

Binomial name
- Astralium confragosum (Gould, 1851)

Synonyms
- Astralium plicatospinosum Pilsbry, 1889; Turbo confragosus Gould, 1851

= Astralium confragosum =

Species of gastropod

Astralium confragosum is a species of sea snail, a marine gastropod mollusk in the family Turbinidae, the turban snails.

== Description ==
The size of the shell varies between 15 mm and 36 mm. Rather low-conic shell is conspicuously radiately plicate above. The folds are somewhat sigmoid and oblique, bearing a series of short rounded knobs above, and terminating in short spines, eighteen to twenty in number, at the carinated periphery. The base of the shell is flat, squamosely lirate. The aperture is tinged with green, especially at the columella. The wrinkled operculum is deep green.

== Distribution ==
This marine species occurs off Hawaii, French Polynesia and the Marianas.
