= Tropidomarga biangulata =

Scientific classification
- Kingdom: Animalia
- Phylum: Mollusca
- Class: Gastropoda
- Subclass: Vetigastropoda
- Order: Trochida
- Family: Turbinidae
- Genus: Tropidomarga
- Species: T. biangulata

Binomial name
- Tropidomarga biangulata A. W. B. Powell, 1951

Species of gastropod

Tropidomarga biangulata is a species of sea snail, a marine gastropod mollusk in the family Turbinidae, the turban snails.

== Description ==
The size of the shell attains 15 mm.

== Distribution ==
This marine species occurs off the South Georgia Islands.
