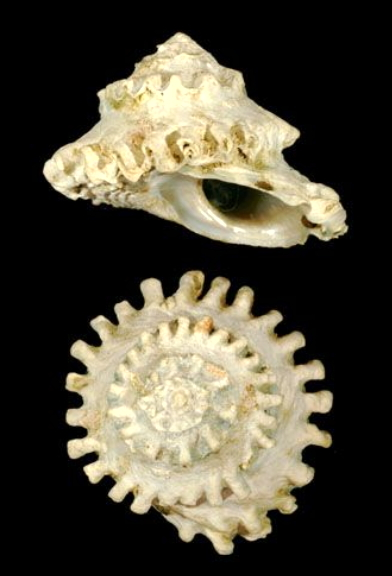
- Shell of Astralium rotularium (specimen in the Natural History Museum, Rotterdam)

Scientific classification
- Kingdom: Animalia
- Phylum: Mollusca
- Class: Gastropoda
- Subclass: Vetigastropoda
- Order: Trochida
- Family: Turbinidae
- Genus: Astralium
- Species: A. rotularium

Binomial name
- Astralium rotularium (Lamarck, 1822)

Synonyms
- Trochus rotularius Lamarck, 1822

= Astralium rotularium =

Species of gastropod

Astralium rotularium, common name the rotary star shell or the knob star shell, is a species of sea snail, a marine gastropod mollusk in the family Turbinidae, the turban snails.

== Description ==
The size of the shell varies between 25 mm and 50 mm. The white, subdepressed, imperforate shell has a conoid shape. The spire is subacute. The six whorls are obliquely finely costulate with numerous prominent imbricating laterally compressed plicae at the sutures. The body whorl is carinated with plicate-nodose carina. The base of the shell is convex, squamosely concentrically lirate. The white columella is arcuate, not dentate. The aperture is oblique.

== Distribution ==
This marine species is endemic to Australia and occurs off the Northern Territory, Queensland and Western Australia.
