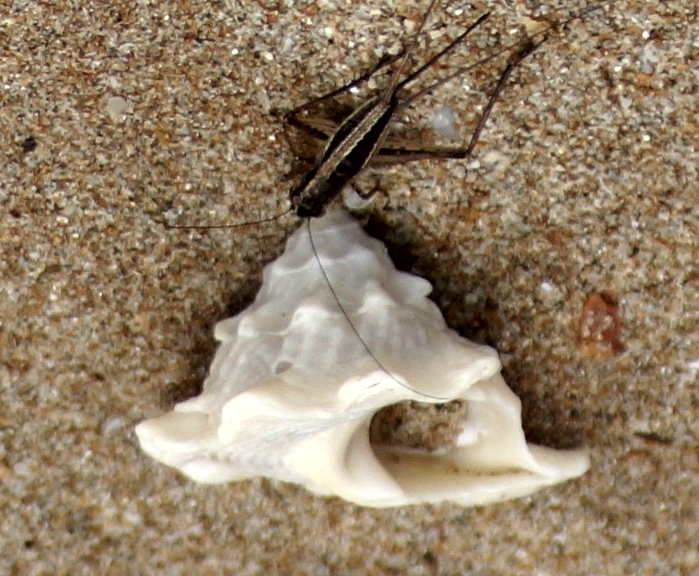
- Shell of Astralium asteriscus

Scientific classification
- Kingdom: Animalia
- Phylum: Mollusca
- Class: Gastropoda
- Subclass: Vetigastropoda
- Order: Trochida
- Family: Turbinidae
- Genus: Astralium
- Species: A. asteriscus

Binomial name
- Astralium asteriscus (Reeve, 1843)

Synonyms
- Astralium asteriscum (Reeve, 1843); Trochus asteriscus Reeve, 1843 (original description)

= Astralium asteriscus =

Species of gastropod

Astralium asteriscus is a species of sea snail, a marine gastropod mollusk in the family Turbinidae, the turban snails.

== Description ==
The size of the shell varies between 30 mm and 65 mm.

== Distribution ==
This marine species occurs off New Caledonia.
