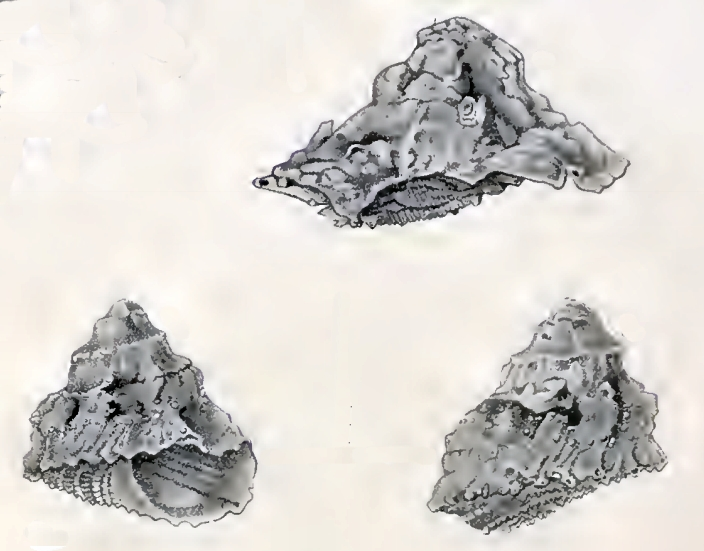
- Original drawing with three views of a shell of Astralium provisorium

Scientific classification
- Kingdom: Animalia
- Phylum: Mollusca
- Class: Gastropoda
- Subclass: Vetigastropoda
- Order: Trochida
- Family: Turbinidae
- Genus: Astralium
- Species: A. provisorium

Binomial name
- Astralium provisorium (Schepman, 1903)

Synonyms
- Astralium roseobasis Kreipl & Dekker, 2003; Astralium (Cyclocantha) provisorium Schepman, 1903 (original combination)

= Astralium provisorium =

Species of gastropod

Astralium provisorium is a species of sea snail, a marine gastropod mollusk in the family Turbinidae, the turban snails.

== Description ==
The length of the shell varies between 15 and 25 millimetres (0.59 and 0.98 in). The imperforate shell has a conoidal shape with a flat base and contains about five whorls. The three upper whorls are three eroded and nearly covered by incrustations, but apparently rather smooth. The penultimate whorl shows oblique wrinkles, crossed by 3 or 4 spiral rows of square granules. Towards the body whorl, about eight irregular tubercles make their appearance. These are also covered by the wrinkles and granules, below the tubercles. The last row of granules runs uninterrupted and is succeeded towards the keel by short plications, which have about the same direction as the wrinkles. Moreover, the upper surface of this whorl is covered by spiral lirae, only visible under a lens. The whorls are inflated at their upper part, concave at the lower portion and are then again broader, thus covering the sutures and even part of the subsequent whorls. The keel is very sharp, with short spines, about 1 to 7 in number, if seen from the base. These spines are compressed, and open in front. The base of the shell is flat, with 8 irregular lirae, with compressed scales. Towards the keel, a few undulating spiral striae appear. This sculpture is crossed by small radiating riblets. The aperture is rhomboidal, very oblique, with sharp edges and an internal nacreous layer, at some distance from the margin, with 10 lirae near this margin, and a groove corresponding to the keel. The basal margin is smooth. The thick columella is emarginate, thickened towards the base and forming a toothlike angle, at the junction with the basal margin. The colour of the shell is yellowish-olive. The top whorls, a zone at the base of the whorls, especially of the last oneare rose-coloured. The base is tinted with the same colour.

== Distribution ==
This marine species occurs off the Sulu Archipelago, southwestern Philippines
