= Tectariopsis =

Scientific classification
- Kingdom: Animalia
- Phylum: Mollusca
- Class: Gastropoda
- Subclass: Vetigastropoda
- Order: Trochida
- Superfamily: Trochoidea
- Family: Turbinidae
- Genus: †Tectariopsis; Cossmann, 1888

Extinct genus of gastropods

Tectariopsis is an extinct genus of sea snails, marine gastropod mollusks, in the family Turbinidae.

== Species ==
Species within the genus Tectariopsis include:

- † Tectariopsis henrici (Caillat, 1835)
