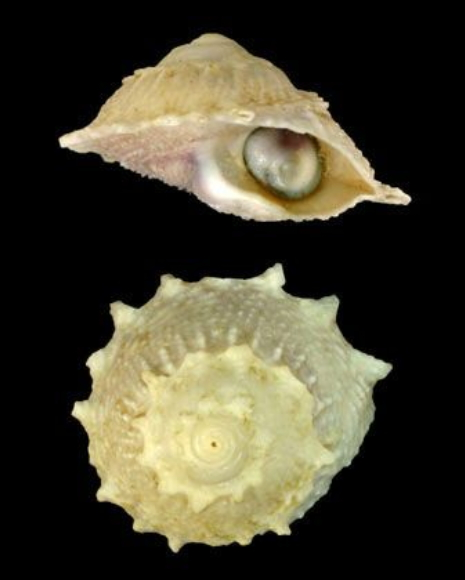
- shell of Astralium heimburgi (specimen at the Natural History Museum, Rotterdam)

Scientific classification
- Kingdom: Animalia
- Phylum: Mollusca
- Class: Gastropoda
- Subclass: Vetigastropoda
- Order: Trochida
- Family: Turbinidae
- Genus: Astralium
- Species: A. heimburgi

Binomial name
- Astralium heimburgi (Dunker, 1882)

Synonyms
- Astraea heimburgi (Dunker, 1882); Uvanilla heimburgi Dunker, 1882

= Astralium heimburgi =

Species of gastropod

Astralium heimburgi is a species of sea snail, a marine gastropod mollusk in the family Turbinidae, the turban snails.

== Description ==
The size of the shell varies between 20 mm and 25 mm. The conic shell is imperforate. The five whorls are flattened and subgranosely densely lirate. The periphery is carinated, armed with compressed imbricated subdeflexed spines. The base of the shell is plano-convex, ornamented with spiral subimbricated lirae. The columella has an oblong excavation at its termination. The aperture is subrotund, silvery margaritaceous within. The shell color is whitish, subroseous at the base.

== Distribution ==
This marine species occurs off Japan and Indonesia.
