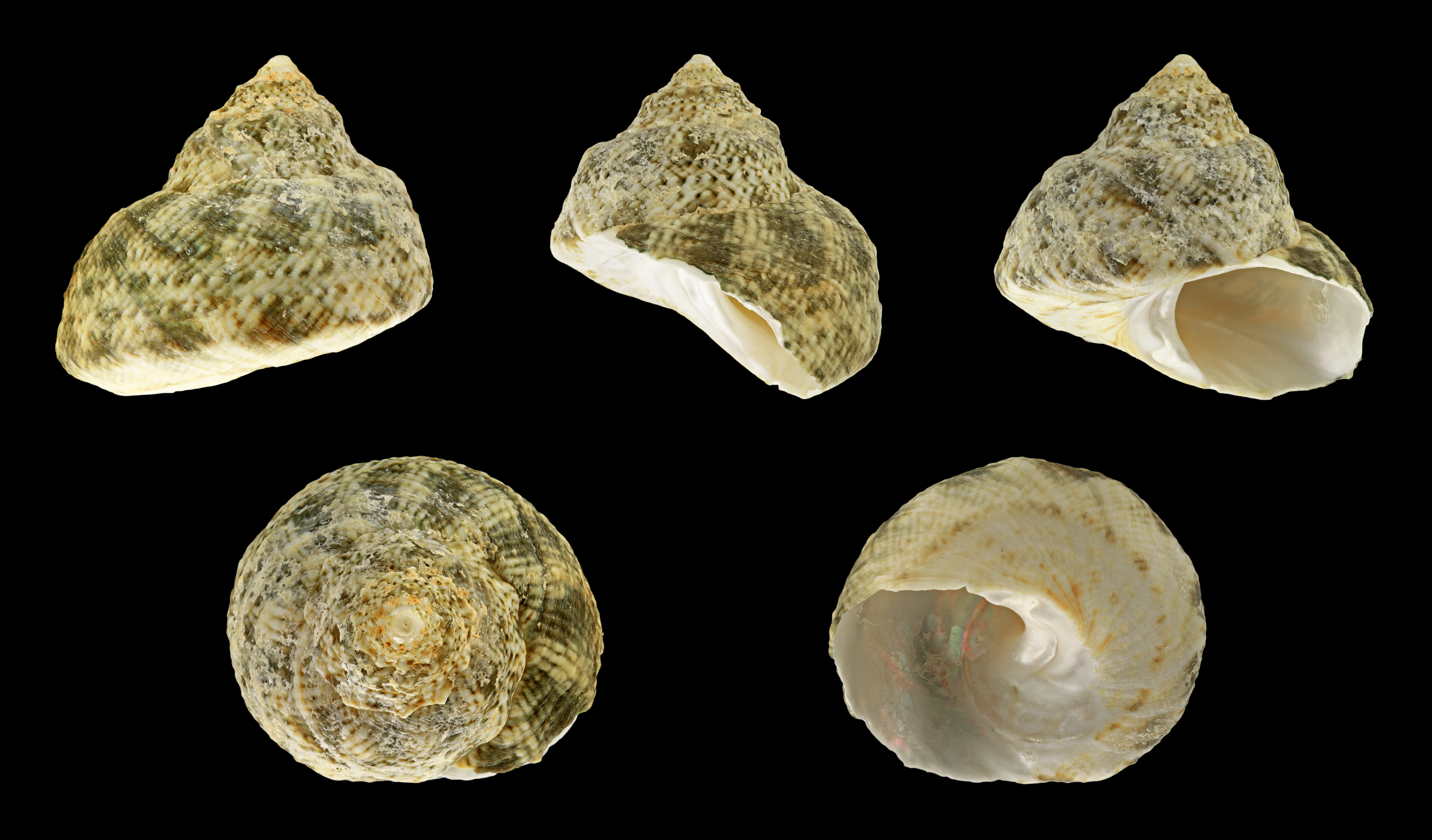
- Shell of Lithopoma tuber (Linnaeus, 1758)

Scientific classification
- Kingdom: Animalia
- Phylum: Mollusca
- Class: Gastropoda
- Subclass: Vetigastropoda
- Order: Trochida
- Family: Turbinidae
- Genus: Lithopoma
- Species: L. tuber

Binomial name
- Lithopoma tuber (Linnaeus, 1758

Synonyms
- Astraea dominicana A. H. Verrill, 1950; Astraea tuber (Linnaeus, 1758); Astraea tuber dominicana A. H. Verrill, 1950; Astraea venezuelensis Flores & Caceres, 1984; Astralium tuber Linnaeus, 1758; Cidaris tuberculata Röding, 1798; Imperator tuber Linnaeus, 1758; Trochus tuber Linnaeus, 1758

= Lithopoma tuber =

Species of gastropod

Lithopoma tuber, common name the green star shell, is a species of large sea snail, a marine gastropod mollusk in the family Turbinidae, the turban snails.

== Description ==
The size of the shell varies between 25 mm and 75 mm. The imperforate, very solid shell has a turbinate-conic shape. Its color pattern is dirty white or pale green, radiately maculated with brown above, irregularly marked and lighter below. The shell contains six whorls. The upper two are smooth by erosion, the following whorls are obliquely coarsely plicate and finely wrinkled in the same direction above, somewhat shouldered. They are obtusely angular near the periphery, above which several obscure beaded lirae revolve, shagreened by intersection of incremental striae and oblique wrinkles. The base of the shell is nearly smooth. The oval aperture is very oblique and silvery within. The short columella is wide, and generally bituberculate at the base, excavated over the location of the umbilicus.

The operculum is oval, its nucleus sublateral. Its outside is white or slightly brownish, very convex, nearly smooth, and excavated near the center.

== Distribution ==
This marine species occurs off Southeast Florida, USA and off the West Indies.

== Habitat ==
This species occurs at depths between 0 m and 30 m.
