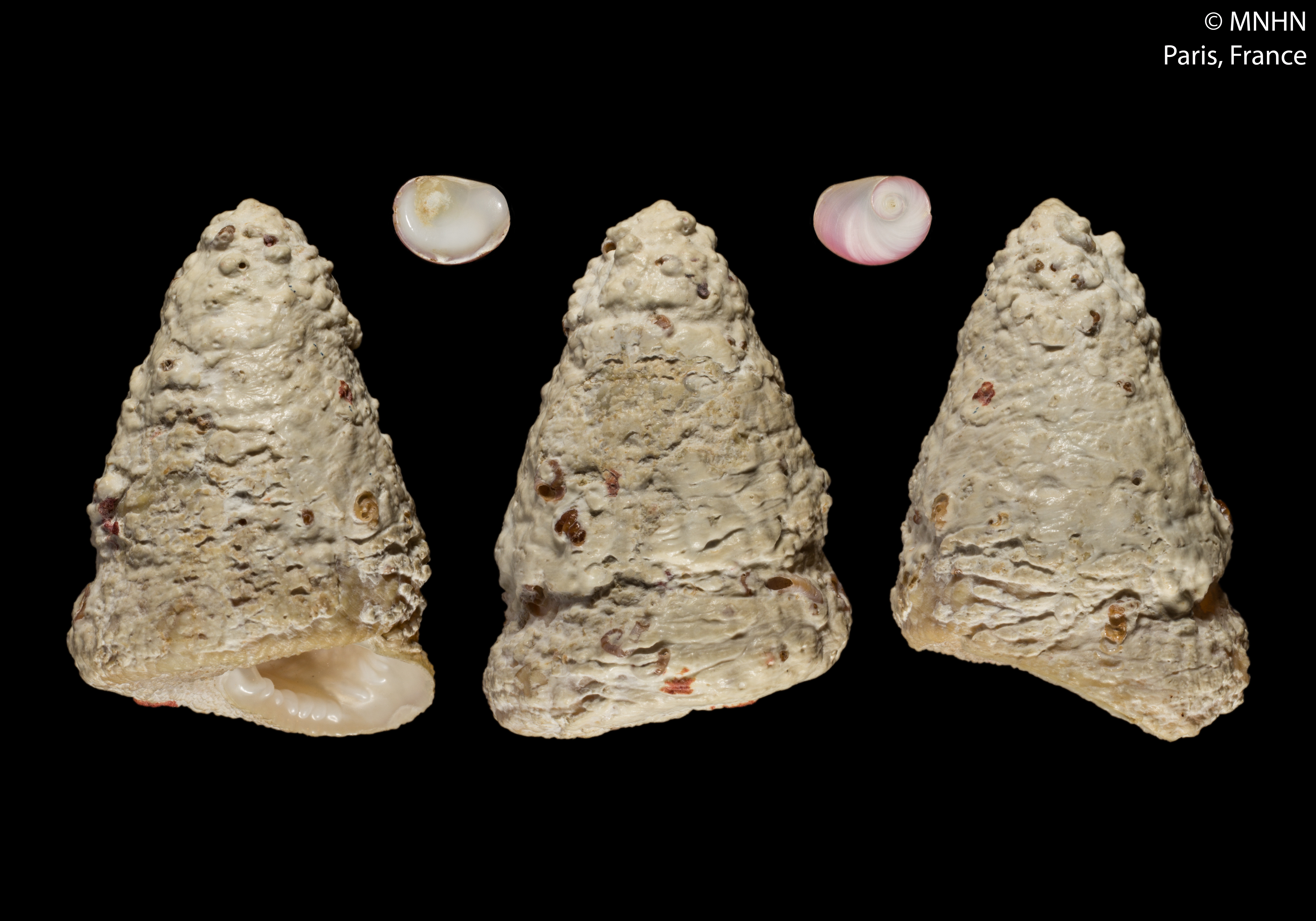
- Shell of Astralium milloni (holotype at MNHN, Paris)

Scientific classification
- Kingdom: Animalia
- Phylum: Mollusca
- Class: Gastropoda
- Subclass: Vetigastropoda
- Order: Trochida
- Family: Turbinidae
- Genus: Astralium
- Species: A. milloni

Binomial name
- Astralium milloni (B. Salvat, F. Salvat & Richard, 1973)

Synonyms
- Astraea (Calcar) milloni B. Salvat, F. Salvat & Richard, 1973

= Astralium milloni =

Species of gastropod

Astralium milloni is a species of sea snail, a marine gastropod mollusk in the family Turbinidae, the turban snails.

== Distribution ==
This species occurs in the Pacific Ocean. The holotype was found off French Polynesia.
