= Astralium danieli =

Scientific classification
- Kingdom: Animalia
- Phylum: Mollusca
- Class: Gastropoda
- Subclass: Vetigastropoda
- Order: Trochida
- Family: Turbinidae
- Genus: Astralium
- Species: A. danieli

Binomial name
- Astralium danieli (Alf & Kreipl, 2006)

Synonyms
- Astraea (Astralium) danieli Alf & Kreipl, 2006; Astraea danieli Alf & Kreipl, 2006 (basionym)

Species of gastropod

Astralium danieli is a species of sea snail, a marine gastropod mollusk in the family Turbinidae, the turban snails.

== Distribution ==
This marine species occurs off Bali, Indonesia.
