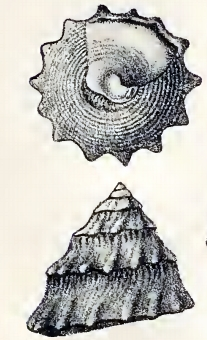
- Drawing with two views of a shell of Astralium semicostatum

Scientific classification
- Kingdom: Animalia
- Phylum: Mollusca
- Class: Gastropoda
- Subclass: Vetigastropoda
- Order: Trochida
- Family: Turbinidae
- Genus: Astralium
- Species: A. semicostatum

Binomial name
- Astralium semicostatum (Kiener, 1850)

Synonyms
- Astraea semicostata (Kiener, 1850); Astralium semicostatum (P. Fischer, 1875); Calcar semicostatum P. Fischer, 1875; Trochus semicostatus Kiener, 1850 (original combination)

= Astralium semicostatum =

Species of gastropod

Astralium semicostatum, common name the half-ribbed star shell, is a species of sea snail, a marine gastropod mollusk in the family Turbinidae, the turban snails.

== Taxonomy ==
Authorship of this taxon is often attributed to Paul Fischer, who wrote the text portion of volume 11 of "Spécies général et iconographie des coquilles vivantes...". A description of this species appears on page 35 of that volume (as Calcar semicostatum; published in 1875). However, the species had been introduced earlier in the plates (pl 38, fig. 1; published in 1850 under the direction of Kiener), under the name Trochus semicostatus.

== Description ==
The size of the shell varies between 25 mm and 40 mm. The solid, imperforate shell has an elevated-conic shape. Its color pattern is olive-brown or cinereous. The apex is acute. The 6-7 whorls are, sharply carinated. Their upper surface is concave, longitudinally more or less finely and irregularly plicate below the sutures; coarsely plicate on the lower half of the whorls. The folds terminate in short nodes at the periphery, twelve to sixteen in number on the body whorl, and also scalloping the sutures. The base of the shell is flat, somewhat depressed around the middle, finely concentrically lirate and radiately striate. The lirae number about eight to sixteen. The suboval aperture is very oblique, white within, slightly channelled at the carina, but scarcely angulate. The short columella is bluish, rosy or white, curved, and dentate below. The base of the aperture is horizontal, sometimes with a submarginal row of minute tubercles within.

In some specimens the peripheral spines are rather long and directed outward. The lirae of the base are sometimes coarser than the figures indicate. And in fully matured individuals the outer ones become obsolete.

== Distribution ==
The marine species occurs off Southeast Asia.
