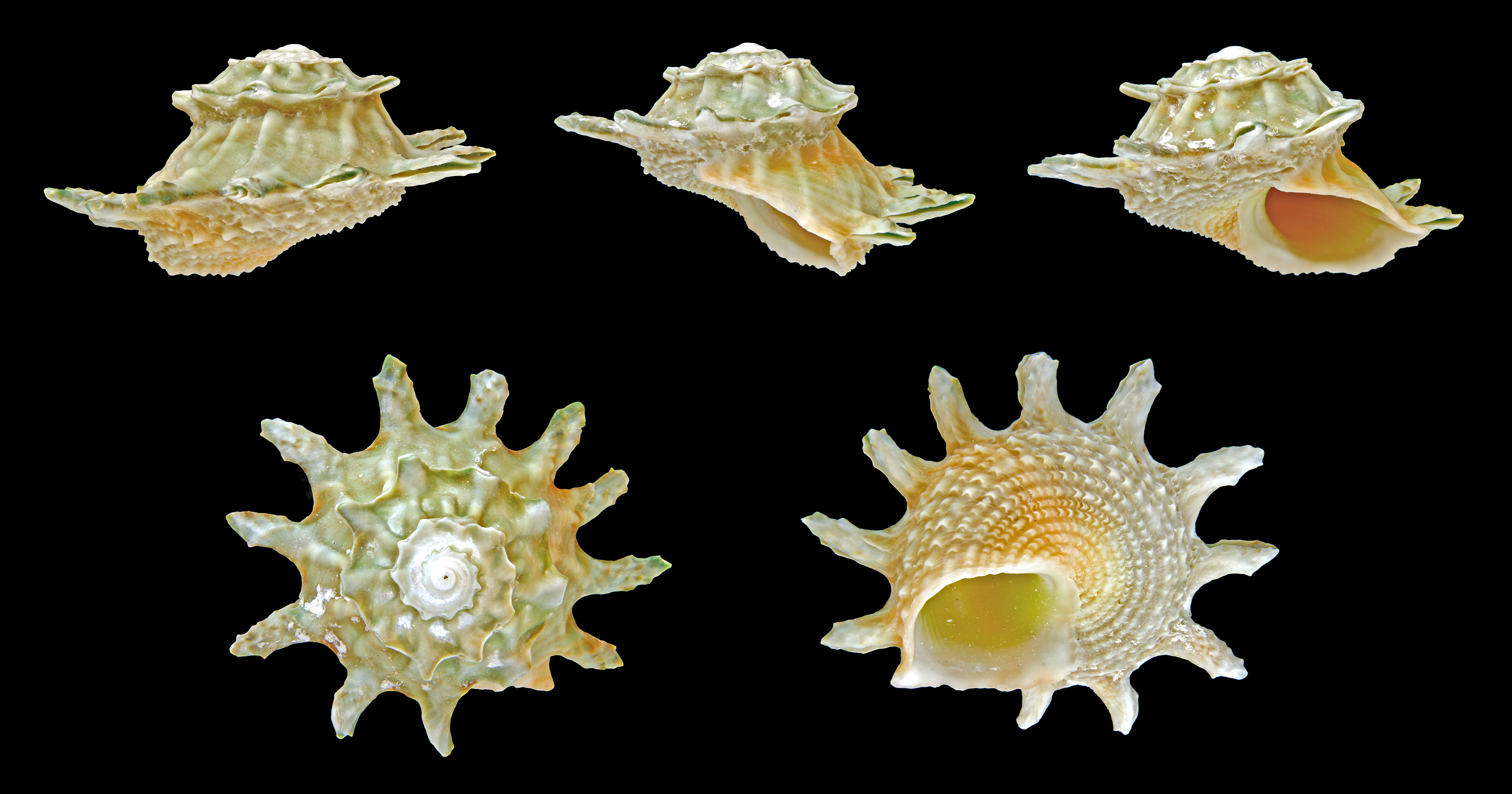
- Five views of a shell of Astralium calcar

Scientific classification
- Kingdom: Animalia
- Phylum: Mollusca
- Class: Gastropoda
- Subclass: Vetigastropoda
- Order: Trochida
- Family: Turbinidae
- Genus: Astralium
- Species: A. calcar

Binomial name
- Astralium calcar (Linnaeus, 1758)

Synonyms
- Astralium (Cyclocantha) calcar (Linnaeus, 1758); Astralium (Cyclocantha) laciniatum Gould, 1849; Calcar sporio Montfort, 1810; Trochus stella Lamarck, 1822; Turbo calcar Linnaeus, 1758 (basionym); Turbo laciniatus Gould, 1849 (taxon inquirendum)

= Astralium calcar =

Species of gastropod

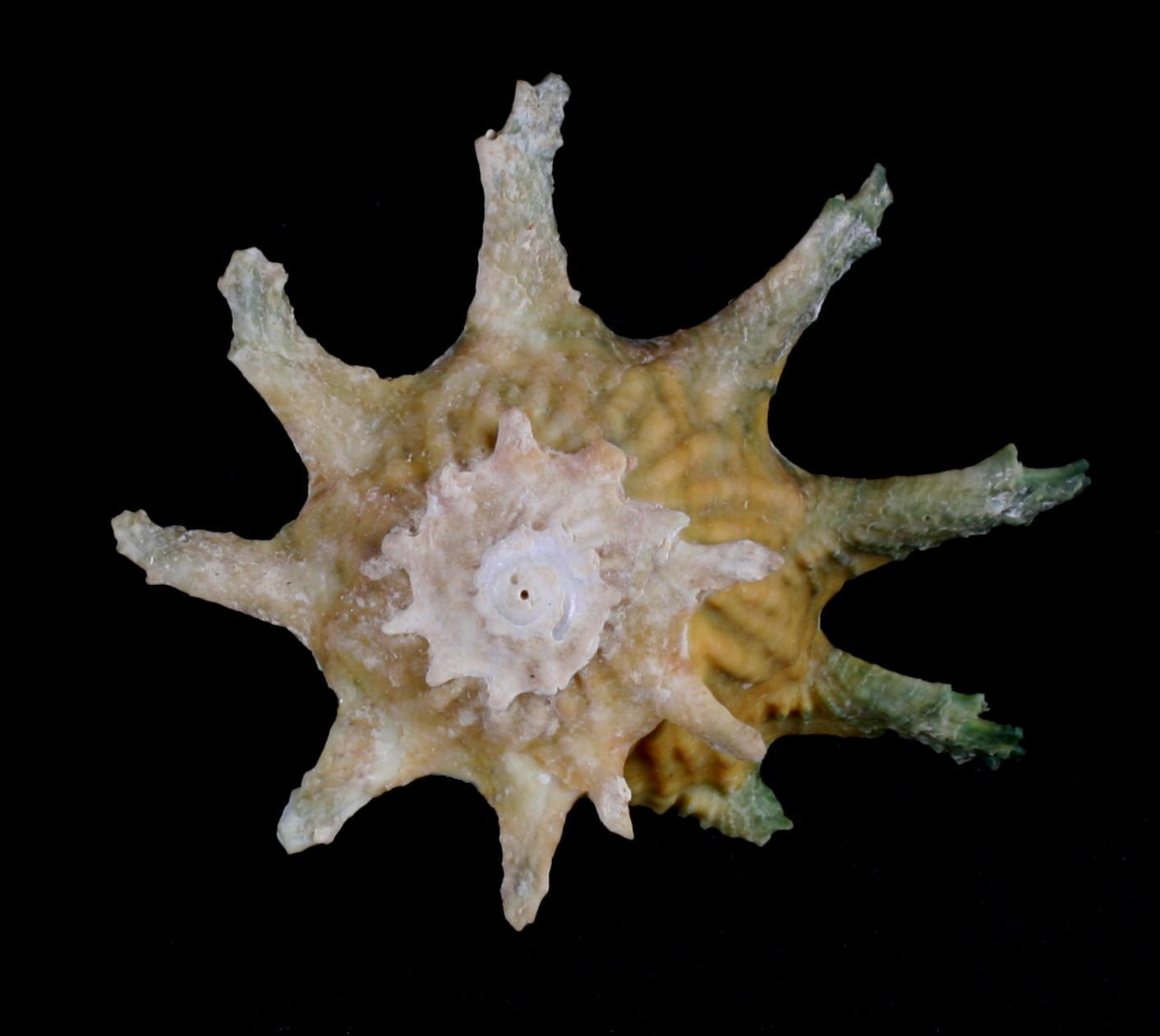
Close up apical view of Shell of Astralium calcar (Linnaeus, 1758), measuring 15.9 mm height by 27.7 mm diameter, trawled in deep water in the Philippines.

Astralium calcar is a species of sea snail, a marine gastropod mollusk in the family Turbinidae, the turban snails.

== Description ==
The height of the shell is 28 mm, its diameter 40 mm. The conoid shell is more or less depressed at the apex. Its color pattern is grayish-greenish, or brownish-cinereous. The six whorls are flattened above, and radiately plicate, the folds rather unequal and irregular. The periphery is carinate and spinose, bearing about twelve radiating more or less foliated spines on the body whorl. This body whorl descends deeply toward the aperture. The convex base is concentrically more or less densely squamosely lirate, the outer lirae are generally prominent and subspinose, sometimes causing the periphery to appear bicarinate. The aperture is transversely oval, very oblique, generally golden within, and stained with purple or blue on the columella.

== Distribution ==
This marine species occurs off the Philippines, Indo-Malaysia and Queensland, Australia.
