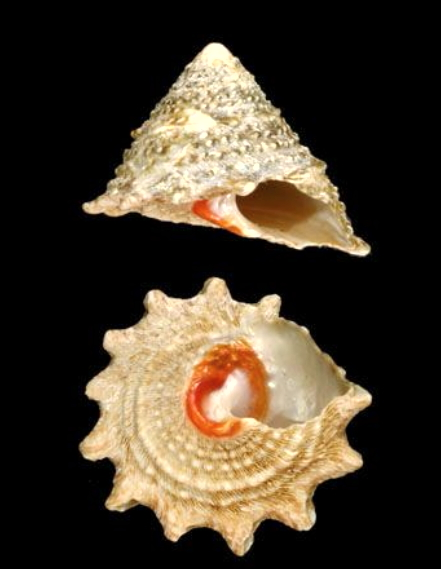
- Shell of Astralium latispina (specimen at the Natural History Museum, Rotterdam)

Scientific classification
- Kingdom: Animalia
- Phylum: Mollusca
- Class: Gastropoda
- Subclass: Vetigastropoda
- Order: Trochida
- Family: Turbinidae
- Genus: Astralium
- Species: A. latispina

Binomial name
- Astralium latispina (Philippi, 1844)

Synonyms
- Astraea latispina (Philippi, 1844); Astraea (Astralium) latispina (Lamarck, 1822); Trochus latispina Philippi, 1844

= Astralium latispina =

Species of gastropod

Astralium latispina is a species of sea snail, a marine gastropod mollusk in the family Turbinidae, the turban snails.

== Description ==
The length of the shell varies between 30 mm and 75 mm. The imperforate shell has a conic shape. It is greenish, brown maculated. The seven whorls are subplanate, obliquely costulate below the sutures, then with two beaded spiral lirae. The margins of the whorls are exserted, expanded, compressed, armed with triangular spines. The body whorl is sharply carinate. The base of the shell is radiately lamellose and ornamented with three or four granose concentric costae. The umbilical area is depressed, pale greenish or yellowish. The oblique aperture is angulate. The oval operculum is on the outside white, smooth, with a single arcuate wide rib. On the inside it is flat, chestnut colored. The nucleus is submarginal.

== Distribution ==
This species occurs in the Gulf of Mexico and in the Atlantic Ocean off Brazil.
