= Tropidomarga =

Scientific classification
- Kingdom: Animalia
- Phylum: Mollusca
- Class: Gastropoda
- Subclass: Vetigastropoda
- Order: Trochida
- Superfamily: Trochoidea
- Family: Turbinidae
- Genus: Tropidomarga; Powell, 1951

Genus of gastropods

Tropidomarga is a genus of sea snails, marine gastropod mollusks in the family Trochidae, the top snails.

This genus was previously included in the family Trochidae.

== Species ==
Species within the genus Tropidomarga include:

- Tropidomarga biangulata A. W. B. Powell, 1951
