= Bolma johnstoni =

Scientific classification
- Kingdom: Animalia
- Phylum: Mollusca
- Class: Gastropoda
- Subclass: Vetigastropoda
- Order: Trochida
- Family: Turbinidae
- Genus: Bolma
- Species: B. johnstoni

Binomial name
- Bolma johnstoni (Odhner, 1923)

Synonyms
- Astraea johnsoni (Odhner, 1923) (misspelling); Astralium johnsoni Odhner, 1923

Species of gastropod

Bolma johnstoni is a species of sea snail, a marine gastropod mollusk in the family Turbinidae, the turban snails.

== Description ==
The shell grows to a length of 37 mm.

== Distribution ==
This species occurs in the Atlantic Ocean off Sierra Leone and Angola.
