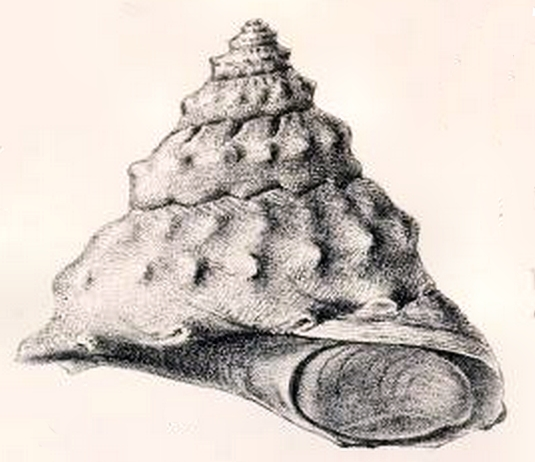
- Drawing with an apertural view of a shell of Bolma andersoni

Scientific classification
- Kingdom: Animalia
- Phylum: Mollusca
- Class: Gastropoda
- Subclass: Vetigastropoda
- Order: Trochida
- Family: Turbinidae
- Genus: Bolma
- Species: B. andersoni

Binomial name
- Bolma andersoni (E.A. Smith, 1902)

Synonyms
- Astraea andersoni (Smith, 1902); Astralium andersoni E.A. Smith, 1902 (basionym); Astralium (Bolma) andersoni E. A. Smith, 1902

= Bolma andersoni =

Species of gastropod

Bolma andersoni, common name Anderson's star shell, is a species of sea snail, a marine gastropod mollusk in the family Turbinidae, the turban snails.

== Description ==
The size of the shell varies between 50 mm and 87 mm.

== Distribution ==
This species occurs in the Western Indian Ocean between Transkei and KwaZuluNatal.
