= Bolma bathyraphis =

Scientific classification
- Kingdom: Animalia
- Phylum: Mollusca
- Class: Gastropoda
- Subclass: Vetigastropoda
- Order: Trochida
- Family: Turbinidae
- Genus: Bolma
- Species: B. bathyraphis

Binomial name
- Bolma bathyraphis (E. A. Smith, 1899)

Synonyms
- Astraea gilchristi (G. B. Sowerby III, 1903); Astralium bathyraphe E.A. Smith, 1899 (original description); Astralium gilchristi G.B. Sowerby III, 1903; Astralium (Cyclocantha) gilchristi G. B. Sowerby III, 1903; Bolma guttata bathyraphis (E. A. Smith, 1899)

Species of gastropod

Bolma bathyraphis is a species of sea snail, a marine gastropod mollusk in the family Turbinidae, the turban snails.

== Description ==
The size of the shell attains 35 mm. The imperforate shell has a turbinate shape with a conical spire, nine whorls and deeply, broadly canaliculate sutures. The spire is marked by a row of granules. The white apex is obtuse and plane. The periphery is formed of a squamose keel which is spirally irregularly striated. it ascends the spire above the sutural furrow, and between it and the suture there is a series of very small white granules. Of the row of granules upon the lower half of the body whorl, the third from the periphery is a little larger than the first and second and much larger than those below. Both above and below this third row a few spiral elevated lines are noticeable. The aperture, has an irregular rounded shape. Although quite smooth within, it has the appearance of being sulcated, the pseudo-sulci corresponding to the rows of granules.

== Distribution ==
This marine species occurs in the Eastern Indian Ocean and off the Maldives and New Caledonia.
