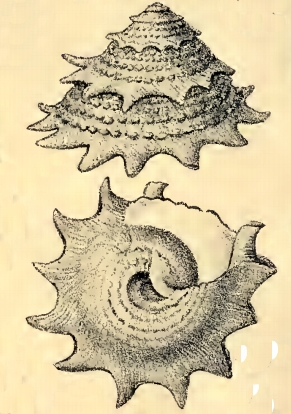
- Drawing with two views of a shell of Lithopoma brevispina

Scientific classification
- Kingdom: Animalia
- Phylum: Mollusca
- Class: Gastropoda
- Subclass: Vetigastropoda
- Order: Trochida
- Family: Turbinidae
- Genus: Lithopoma
- Species: L. brevispina

Binomial name
- Lithopoma brevispina (Lamarck, 1822)

Synonyms
- Astraea brevispina (Lamarck, 1822); Astraea diffidentia Weisbord, N.E., 1962 (synonymy uncertain); Astralium basale Olsson, 1922; Astralium brevispina (Lamarck, 1822); Trochus auripigmentum Philippi, R.A., 1850 (synonymy uncertain); Trochus brevispina Lamarck, 1822 (original combination); Uvanilla brevispina (Lamarck, 1822)

= Lithopoma brevispina =

Species of sea snail

Lithopoma brevispina is a species of sea snail, a marine gastropod mollusk in the family Turbinidae, the turban snails.

== Description ==
The size of the shell varies between 40 mm and 60 mm. The imperforate, solid shell has a turbinate shape. The 6-7 whorls 6- are, flat above, obliquely costate below the sutures, then with several revolving series of granules. The periphery is sharply carinate, armed with short triangular spines which festoon the sutures and project more or less, about 10–13 in number on the body whorl. The base of the shell is a little rounded, radiately lamellose striate and concentrically lirate with three to five lirae, mostly tuberculate, especially in the young. The oval aperture is transverse, channelled at its outer angle. The short columella is arched. The place of the umbilicus is excavated, whitish, bounded by an intensely orange vermillion tract.

== Distribution ==
This marine species occurs off Mexico to Colombia and off the Virgin Islands, found at depths of about 10 m.
