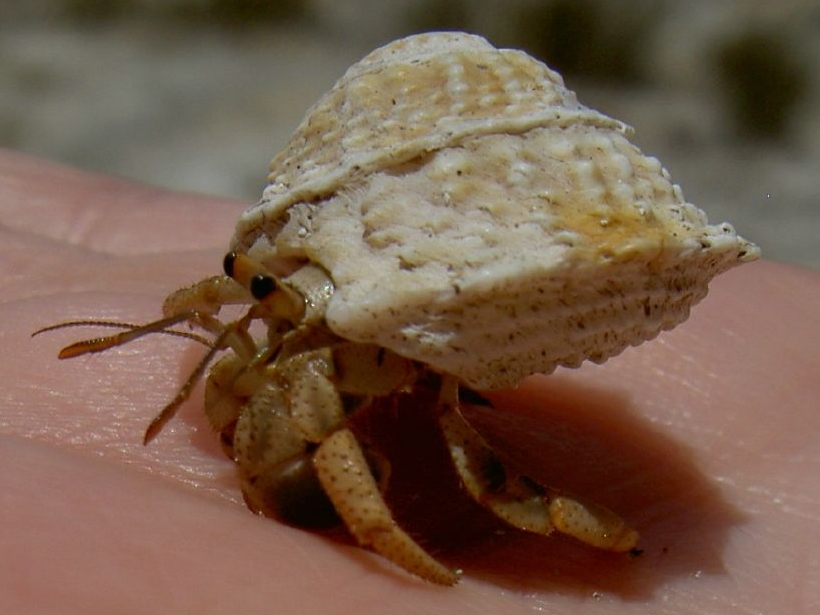
- Hermit crab in a shell of Lithopoma phoebium

Scientific classification
- Kingdom: Animalia
- Phylum: Mollusca
- Class: Gastropoda
- Subclass: Vetigastropoda
- Order: Trochida
- Family: Turbinidae
- Genus: Lithopoma
- Species: L. phoebium

Binomial name
- Lithopoma phoebium (Roding, 1798)

Synonyms
- Astraea brevispina auct. non Lamarck, 1822; Astraea latispina auct. non Philippi, 1844; Astraea longispina Lamarck, 1822; Astraea phoebia Röding, 1798 (basionym); Astraea ruthi Verrill, A.E., 1948; Astraea spinulosum Lamarck, 1822; Astraea titania Röding, 1798; Astraea (Calcar) planoradiatum Schumacher, H.C.F., 1817; Astralium deplanatum Link, H.F., 1807; Astralium heliacum Philippi, 1850; Astralium phoebium (Röding, 1798); Astralium titania Röding, P.F., 1798; Calcar planoradiatum Schumacher, 1817; Imperator longispina Lamarck, 1822; Trochus armatus Philippi, R.A., 1849; Trochus aster Philippi, R.A., 1848; Trochus brevispina auct. non Lamarck, 1822; Trochus costulatus Lamarck, J.B.P.A. de, 1822; Trochus heliachus Philippi, R.A., 1850; Trochus longispina Lamarck, 1822; Trochus orichalceus Philippi, R.A., 1849; Trochus spinulosum Lamarck, J.B.P.A. de, 1822; Uvanilla latispina auct. non Philippi, 1844

= Lithopoma phoebium =

Species of gastropod

Lithopoma phoebium, common name the longspine star shell, is a species of medium-sized sea snail, a marine gastropod mollusk in the family Turbinidae, the turban snails.

== Distribution ==
This is a tropical Western Atlantic species.

Distribution of Lithopoma phoebium include: Aruba, Belize, Bonaire, Caribbean Sea, Cayman Islands, Colombia, Costa Rica, Cuba, Curaçao, Gulf of Mexico, Jamaica, Lesser Antilles, Mexico, Panama, Puerto Rico, San Andres, The United States, and Venezuela.

== Description ==
The maximum recorded shell length is 76 mm (almost 3 inches).

== Habitat ==
The minimum recorded depth for this species is 0 m; maximum recorded depth is 91 m.

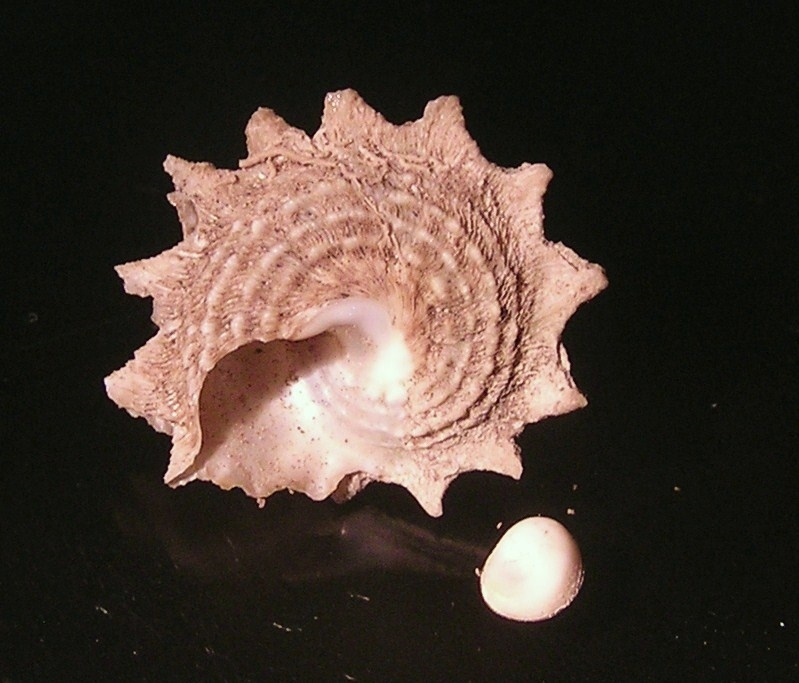
basal view

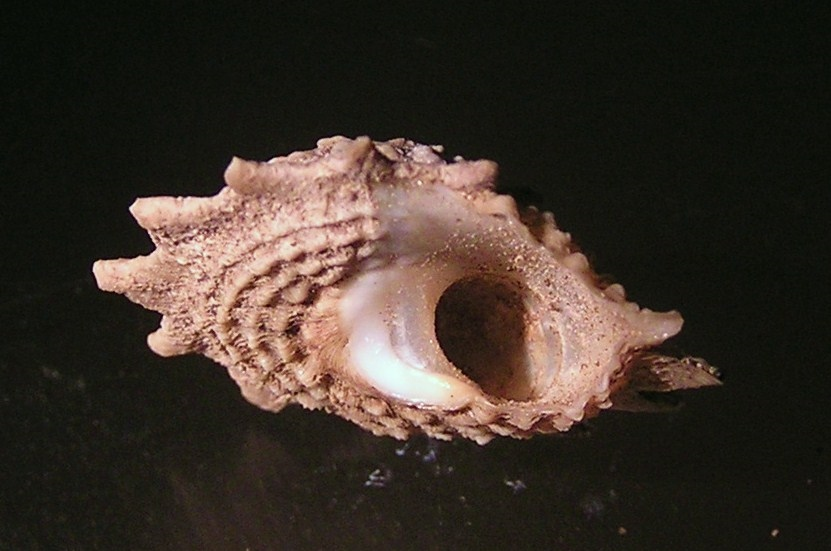
apertural view

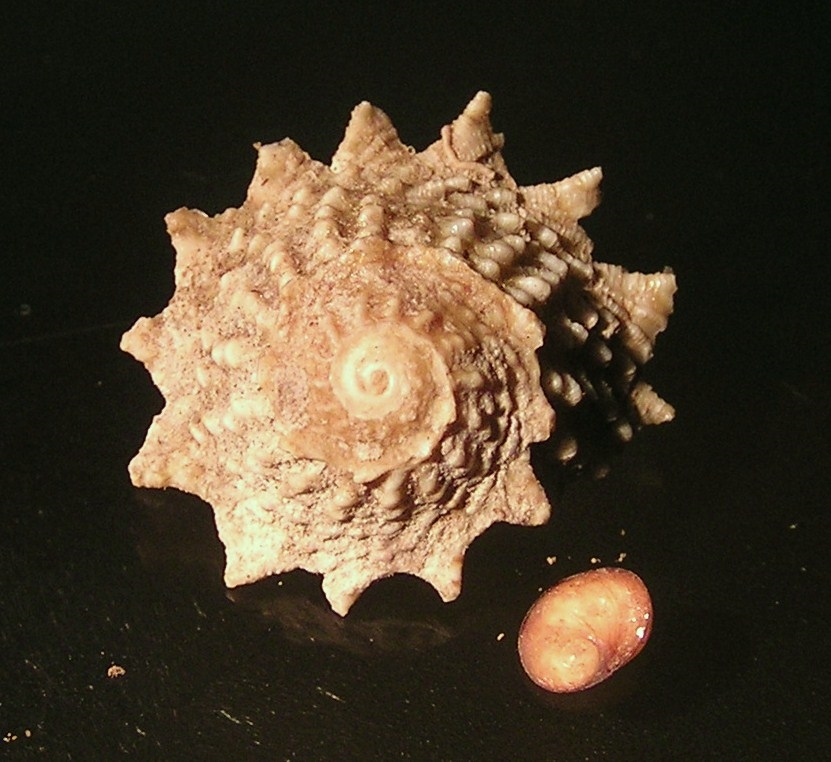
apical view
