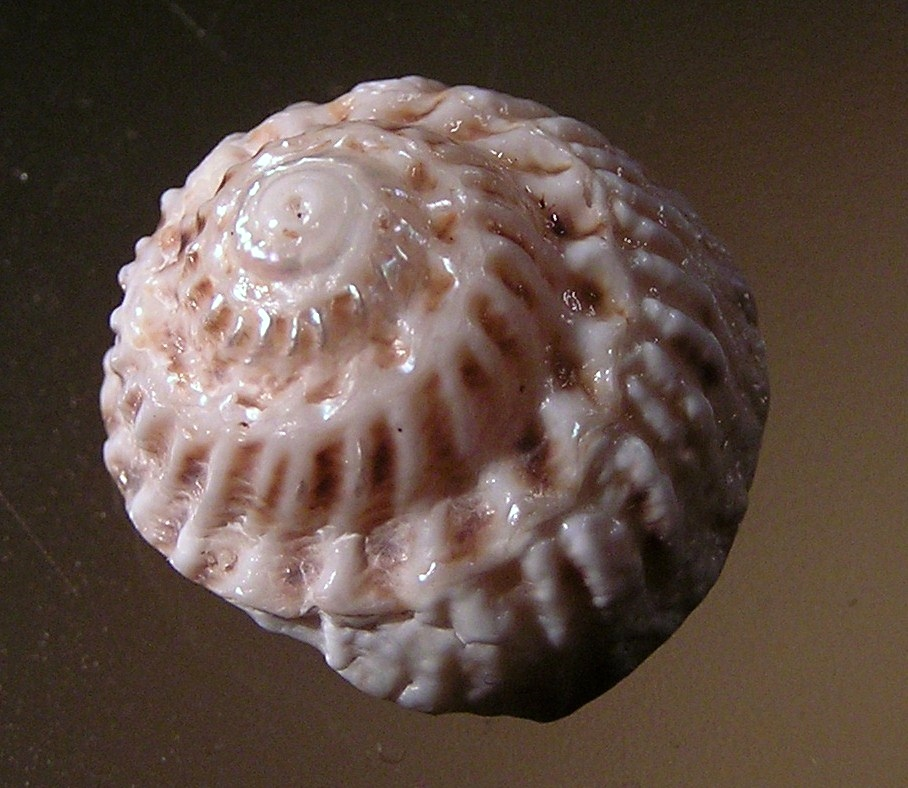

Scientific classification
- Kingdom: Animalia
- Phylum: Mollusca
- Class: Gastropoda
- Subclass: Vetigastropoda
- Order: Trochida
- Family: Turbinidae
- Genus: Bellastraea
- Species: B. squamifera

Binomial name
- Bellastraea squamifera (Iredale, 1924)

Synonyms
- Astraea kesteveni T. Iredale, 1924; Astralium fimbriatum Tryon, 1888; Bellastraea kesteveni (T. Iredale, 1924); Calcar fimbriatum Kiener & Fischer, 1880; Carinidea fimbriata Swainson, 1854; Trochus fimbriatus Lamarck, 1822; Trochus squamiferus Koch in Philippi, 1844 (basionym)

= Bellastraea squamifera =

Species of gastropod

Bellastraea squamifera, the scaly star shell, is a species of sea snail, a marine gastropod mollusk in the family Turbinidae, the turban snails.

== Description ==
The size of the shell varies between 15 mm and 30 mm.

== Distribution ==
This marine species is endemic to Australia and occurs off New South Wales, South Australia, Tasmania, Victoria and Western Australia.

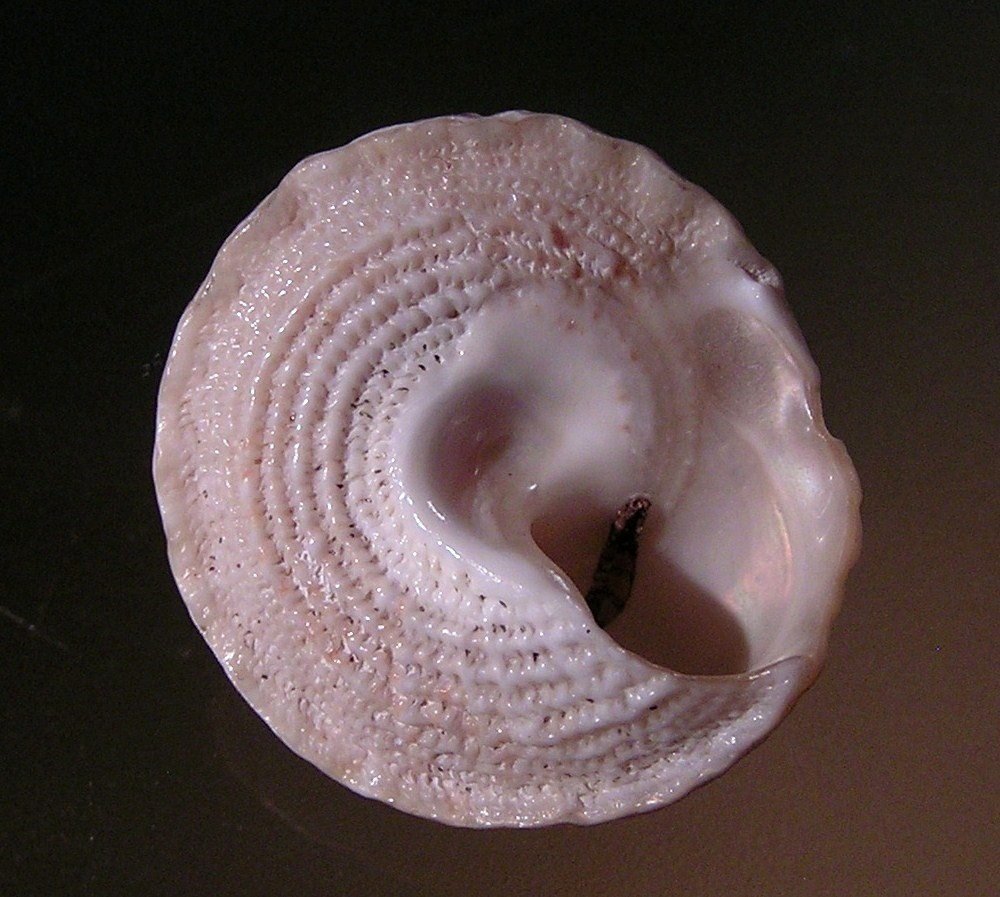
view from below
