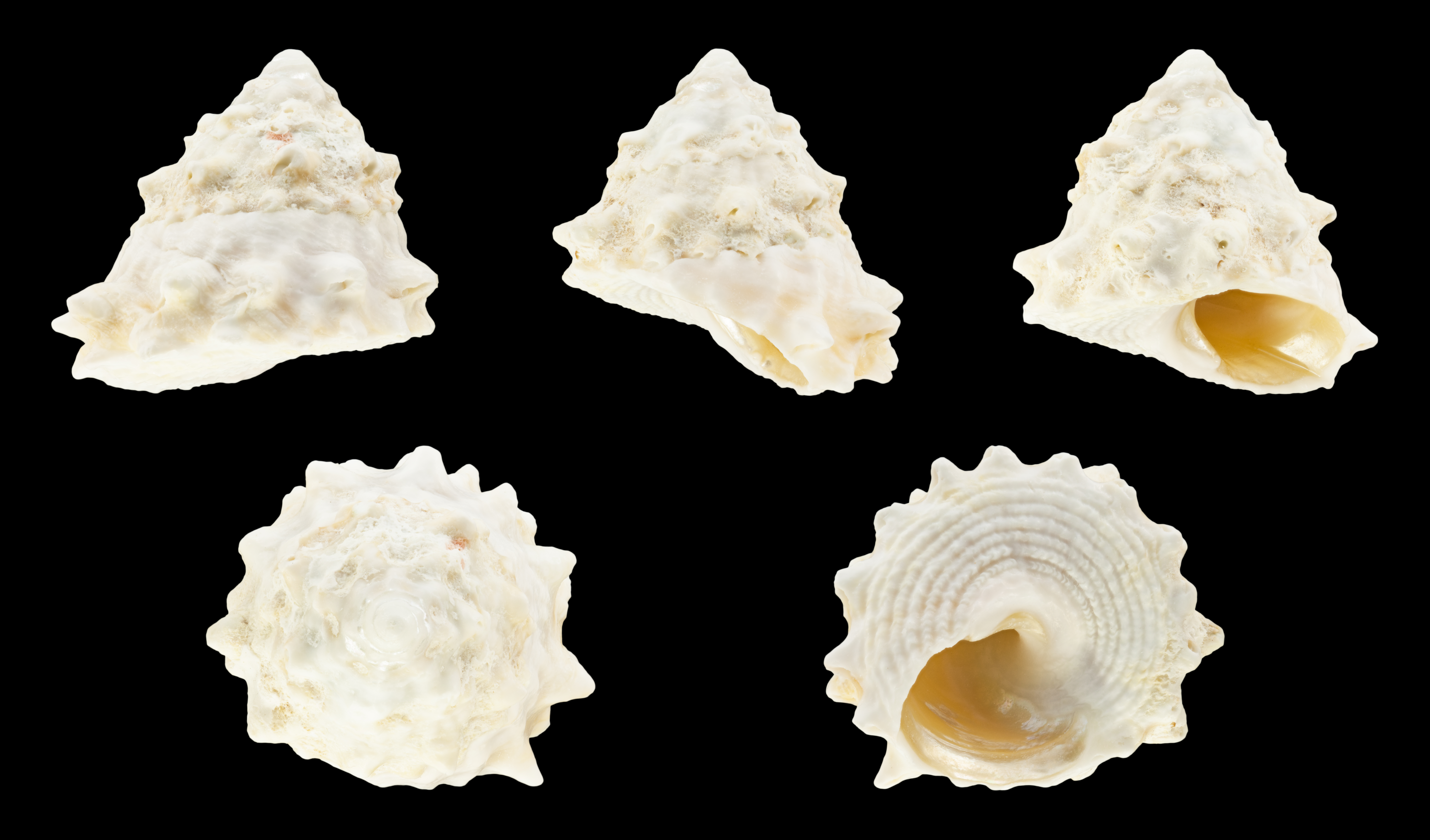
- A shell of Astralium rhodostomum

Scientific classification
- Kingdom: Animalia
- Phylum: Mollusca
- Class: Gastropoda
- Subclass: Vetigastropoda
- Order: Trochida
- Family: Turbinidae
- Genus: Astralium
- Species: A. rhodostomum

Binomial name
- Astralium rhodostomum (Lamarck, 1822)

Synonyms
- Astraea rhodostoma J. B. Lamarck, 1822; Astraea rhodostoma wallisii Kuroda, T. & T. Habe, 1952; Astraea tuberosum; Astralium (Distellifer) rhodostoma (Lamarck, 1822); Astralium tuberosum (Philippi); Distellifer queenslandicus Iredale, 1937; Distellifer wallisi Iredale, 1937; Trochus petrosus Martyn, T. in Kuroda, T., 1928; Trochus rhodostomus Lamarck, 1822 (basionym)

= Astralium rhodostomum =

Species of gastropod

Astralium rhodostomum, common name the rosemouth star shell, is a species of sea snail, a marine gastropod mollusk in the family Turbinidae, the turban snails.

== Description ==
The length of the shell varies between 16 mm and 55 mm. This thick-shelled species stands near to Lithopoma caelatum (Gmelin, 1791), but is distinguished by the following characters: the whorls are flat, not arched, in the middle. The superior nodules are situated near to the suture. They are hemi-spherical and solid. The body whorl has but a single row of nodules. The carina is sharper, the base flatter, with only three concentric nodose lirae. The aperture is lower and more rhomboidal. The color pattern is reddish brown, more or less verging on violet.

== Distribution ==
This species occurs in the Indo-West Pacific and off East India, the Philippines and Australia (Northern Territory, Queensland, Western Australia).
