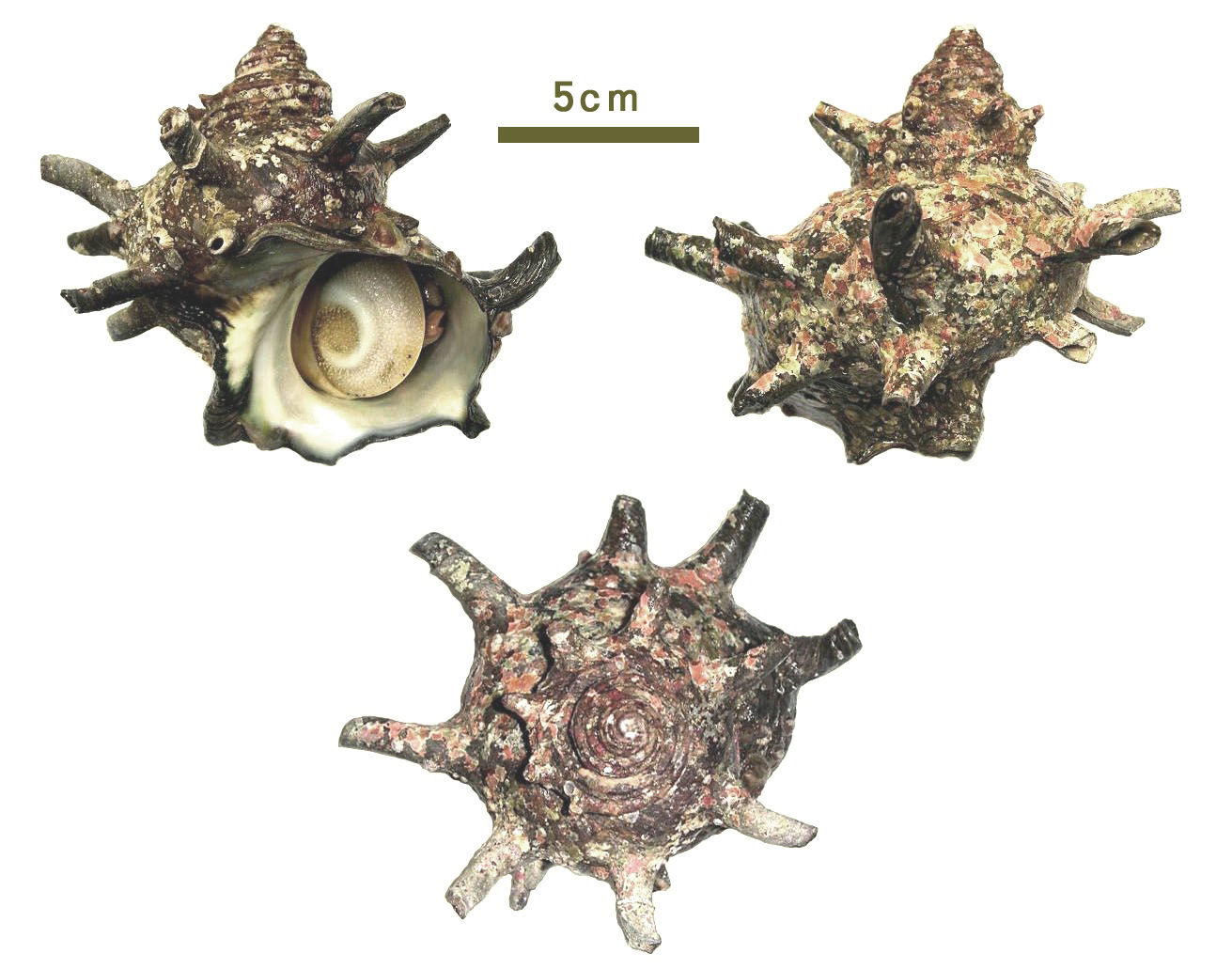
- Three views of a shell of Turbo sazae with the operculum in place

Scientific classification
- Kingdom: Animalia
- Phylum: Mollusca
- Class: Gastropoda
- Subclass: Vetigastropoda
- Order: Trochida
- Superfamily: Trochoidea
- Family: Turbinidae; Rafinesque, 1815

Genera
- See text

= Turbinidae =

Family of gastropods

Turbinidae, the turban snails, are a family of small to large marine gastropod molluscs in the superfamily Trochoidea.

== Description ==
Turbinidae have a strong, thick calcareous operculum readily distinguishing them from the somewhat similar Trochidae or top snails, which have a corneous operculum. This strong operculum serves as a passive defensive structure against predators that try to enter by way of the aperture or that would break the shell at the outer lip. These operculum are rounded ovals that are flat with a swirl design on one side and domed on the other. They are known as Pacific cat's eye or Shiva eye shells or mermaid money, and are used for decorative purposes.

== Etymology ==
The common name turban snail presumably refers to the shell's similarity in appearance to a turban. However, the scientific name Turbinidae is based on the genus name Turbo, which is Latin for spinning top, a child's toy. The word turbine has a similar derivation.

== Taxonomy ==
Previously they were classified in the subclass Prosobranchia, in the order Archaeogastropoda in the superfamily Trochacea. Trochaecea is now a synonym for the superfamily Trochoidea. However, this is a quite ancient group of gastropods, probably originating in the Permian period 298 to 250 million years ago. They have typical primitive characters like the nacreous interior of the shell.

=== 2005 taxonomy ===
Turbinidae belongs to superfamily Turbinoidea according to the taxonomy of the Gastropoda by Bouchet & Rocroi, 2005).

This family consists of eight following subfamilies (according to the taxonomy of the Gastropoda by Bouchet & Rocroi, 2005):

- Turbininae Rafinesque, 1815 - synonyms: Senectinae Swainson, 1840; Imperatorinae Gray, 1847; Astraliinae H. Adams & A. Adams, 1854; Astraeinae Davies, 1935; Bolmidae Delpey, 1941
- Angariinae Gray, 1857 - synonym: Delphinulinae Stoliczka, 1868
- Colloniinae Cossmann, 1917
  - tribe Colloniini Cossmann, 1917 - synonym: Bothropomatinae Thiele, 1924 (inv.); Homalopomatinae Keen, 1960; Petropomatinae Cox, 1960
  - tribe † Adeorbisinini Monari, Conti & szabo, 1995
  - tribe † Crossostomatini Cox, 1960
  - tribe † Helicocryptini Cox, 1960
- Moellerinae Hickman & McLean, 1990
- † Moreanellinae J. C. Fischer & Weber, 1997
- Prisogasterinae Hickman & McLean, 1990 - synonym: "Prisogastrinae" in Bouchet & Rocroi (2005) is a spelling error.
- Skeneinae W. Clark, 1851 - synonym: Delphinoideinae Thiele, 1924
- Tegulinae Kuroda, Habe & Oyama, 1971

=== 2008 taxonomy ===
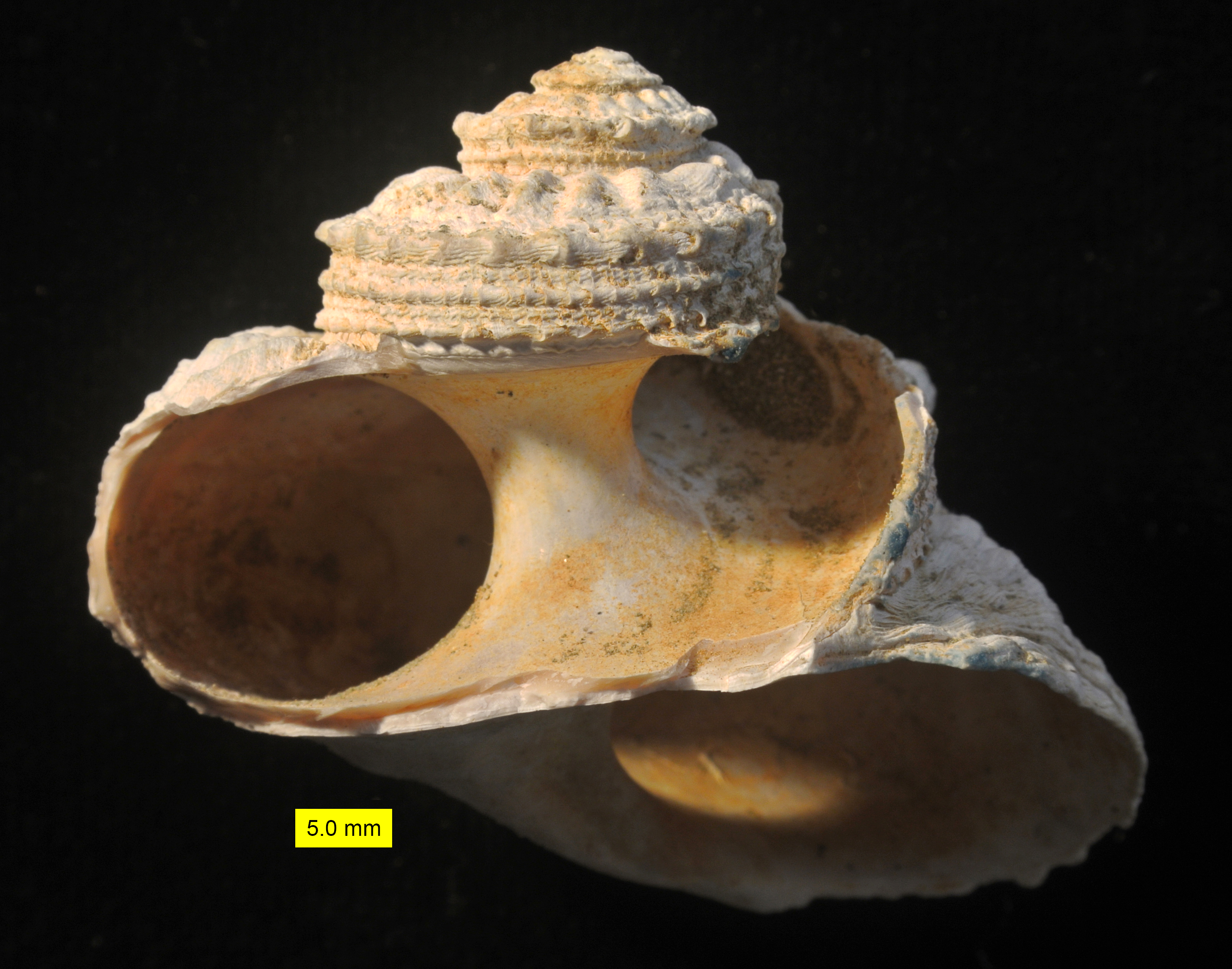
Astraea rugosa (Linnaeus, 1767), a fossil turbinid from the Pliocene of Cyprus.

Turbinidae was redefined and moved to the redefined superfamily Trochoidea according to Williams et al. (2008): Angariidae was elevated to family level, Colloniinae was elevated to family Colloniidae within Phasianelloidea, Margaritinae was moved to Turbinidae from Trochidae.

This family consists of five following subfamilies according to Williams et al. (2008):

- Turbininae Rafinesque, 1815 - synonyms: Senectinae Swainson, 1840; Imperatorinae Gray, 1847; Astraliinae H. Adams & A. Adams, 1854; Astraeinae Davies, 1935; Bolmidae Delpey, 1941
- Skeneinae W. Clark, 1851 - synonym: Delphinoideinae Thiele, 1924 (upgraded to the rank of family Skeneidae)
- Margaritinae Thiele, 1924 - tribes are sensu taxonomy of the Gastropoda by Bouchet & Rocroi, 2005) - upgraded to the rank of family Margaritidae
  - tribe Margaritini Thiele, 1924 - synonym: Margaritinae Stoliczka, 1868 (inv.)
  - tribe Gazini Hickman & McLean, 1990
  - tribe Kaiparathinini Marshall, 1993
- Tegulinae Kuroda, Habe & Oyama, 1971: upgraded to the rank of family Tegulidae Kuroda, Habe & Oyama, 1971
- Prisogasterinae Hickman & McLean, 1990

The following subfamilies (sensu Bouchet & Rocroi (2005) classification of subfamilies in Turbinidae) were kept in Turbinidae:

- Moellerinae Hickman & McLean, 1990 - Moelleria was not included in the molecular studies performed in 2010.
- † Moreanellinae J. C. Fischer & Weber, 1997

== Distribution ==
Turbinids occur in shallow and deep waters. The family has a large distribution, from the tropics to the polar regions, but most of the species live in tropical and subtropical shallow waters. Over the last 50 years a noticeable decline in both size and quantity of turban snail population has been observed by Ama divers of several regions of Japan.

== Genera ==
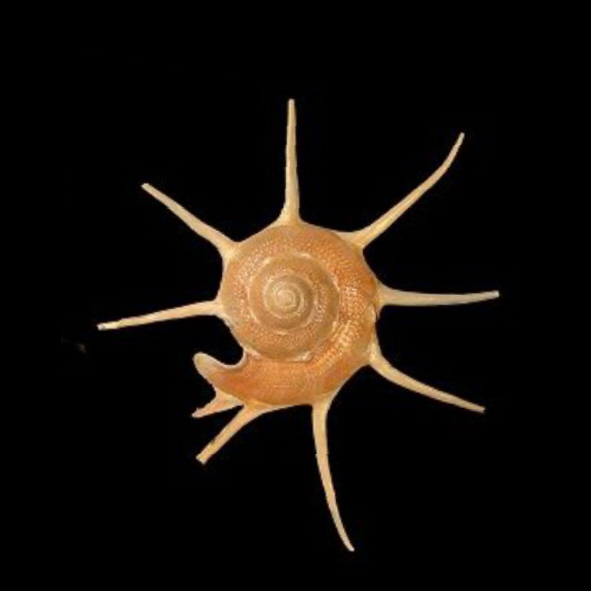
The shell of Guildfordia yoka, a deep water turbinid

Genera in the family Turbinidae include:

Not belonging to any subfamily

- Phanerolepida Dall, 1907
- Tropidomarga Powell, 1951

Turbininae

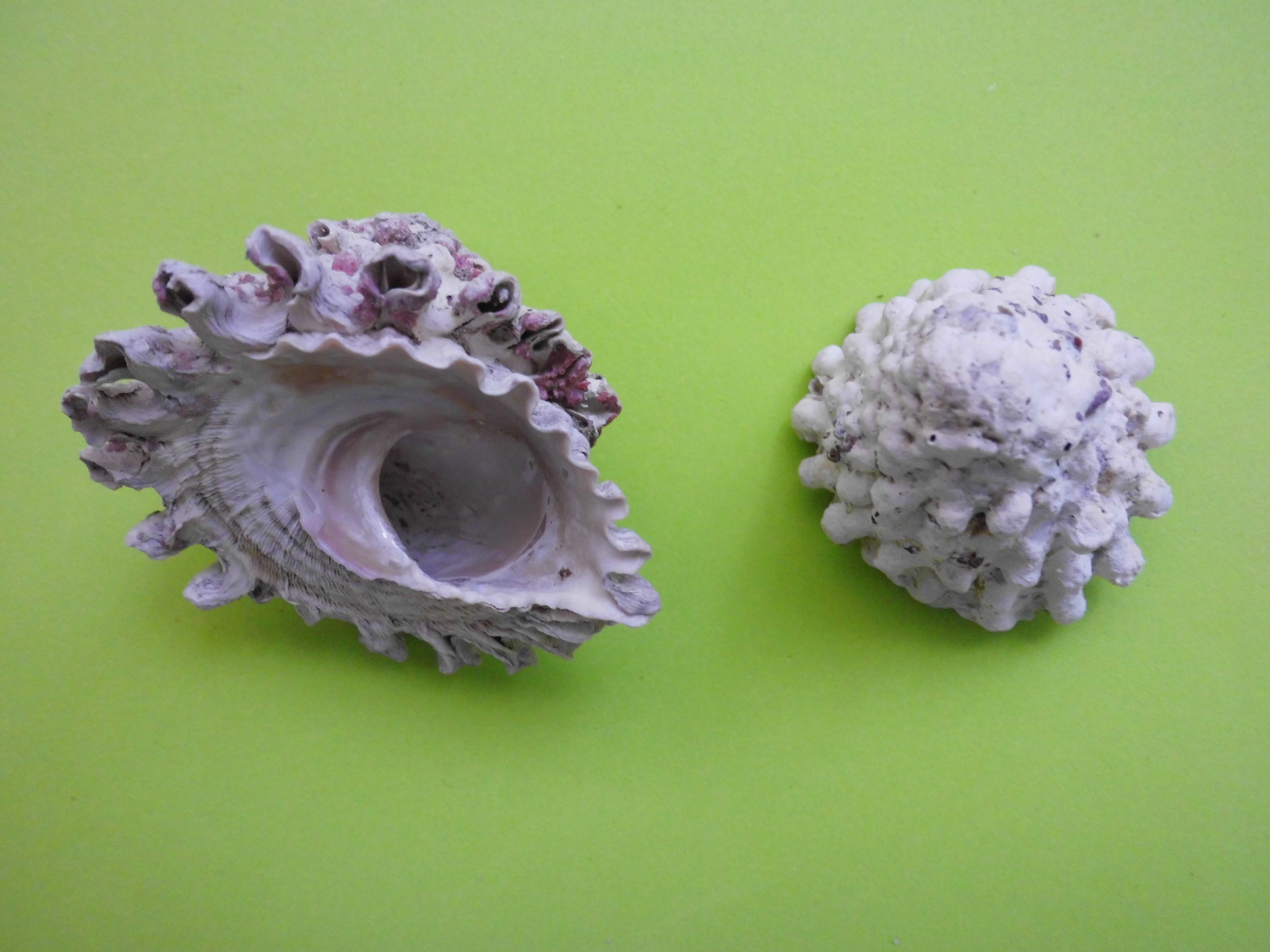
Lithopoma tectum

- Astraea Röding, 1798
- Astralium Link, 1807
- Bellastraea Iredale, 1924
- Bolma Risso, 1826
- Cookia Lesson, 1832
- Guildfordia Gray, 1850
- Lithopoma Gray, 1850
- Lunella Röding, 1798
- Megastraea McLean, 1970
- Modelia Gray, 1850
- Pomaulax Gray, 1850
- Turbo Linnaeus, 1758 - type genus
- Uvanilla Gray, 1850
- Yaronia Mienis, 2011

Prisogasterinae Hickman & McLean, 1990

- Prisogaster Mörch, 1850

Genera brought into synonymy

- Astrea Link, 1807: synonym of Astraea Röding, 1798
- Agathistoma Olsson & Harbison, 1953: synonym of Tegula Lesson, 1832
- Amyxa Troschel, 1852: synonym of Prisogaster Mörch, 1850
- Calcar Montfort, 1810: synonym of Astralium Link, 1807
- Canthorbis Swainson, 1840: synonym of Astraea Röding, 1798
- Cardinalia Gray, 1842: synonym of Tectus Montfort, 1810
- Crosseia P. Fischer, 1885: synonym of Crossea A. Adams, 1865
- Cyclocantha Swainson, 1840: synonym of Astralium Link, 1807
- Dinassovica Iredale, 1937: synonym of Turbo (Turbo) Linnaeus, 1758 represented as Turbo Linnaeus, 1758
- Distellifer Iredale, 1937: synonym of Astralium Link, 1807
- Foliastralium Habe & Okutani, 1980: synonym of Astralium Link, 1807
- Galeoastraea Habe, 1958: synonym of Bolma Risso, 1826
- Halopsephus Rehder, 1943: synonym of Turbo (Halopsephus) Rehder, 1943 represented as Turbo Linnaeus, 1758
- Harisazaea Habe, 1958: synonym of Bolma Risso, 1826
- Imperator Montfort, 1810: synonym of Astraea Röding, 1798
- † Incilaster Finlay, 1926: synonym of Bolma Risso, 1826
- Livona Gray, 1842: synonym of Cittarium Philippi, 1847
- Lunatica Röding, 1798: synonym of Turbo Linnaeus, 1758
- Macropelmus Gistel, 1848: synonym of Astralium Link, 1807
- Margarita Leach, 1819: synonym of Margarites Gray, 1847
- Micrastraea Cotton, 1939: synonym of Bellastraea Iredale, 1924
- Notosetia Iredale, 1915: synonym of Putilla A. Adams, 1867
- Okinawastraea Habe & Okutani, 1981: synonym of Astralium Link, 1807
- † Oobolma Sacco, 1896 : synonym of Bolma Risso, 1826
- † Ormastralium Sacco, 1896: synonym of Bolma Risso, 1826
- Pachypoma Gray, 1850: synonym of Lithopoma Gray, 1850
- Pagocalcar Iredale, 1937: synonym of Astralium Link, 1807
- Pseudastralium Schepman, 1908: synonym of Bolma Risso, 1826
- Pyramidea Swainson, 1840: synonym of Tectus Montfort, 1810
- Pyramis Schumacher, 1817: synonym of Tectus Montfort, 1810
- Rugastella Iredale, 1937: synonym of Astralium Link, 1807
- Senobolma Okutani, 1964: synonym of Bolma Risso, 1826
- Stella P. Fischer, 1885: synonym of Astralium Link, 1807
- Submargarita Strebel, 1908: synonym of Lissotesta Iredale, 1915
- Tharsiella Bush, 1897: synonym of Cirsonella Angas, 1877
- Trochiscus G.B. Sowerby I, 1838: synonym of Norrisia Bayle, 1880
- † Tylastralium Sacco, 1896: synonym of Bolma Risso, 1826
- Valvatella Gray, 1857: synonym of Margarites Gray, 1847
