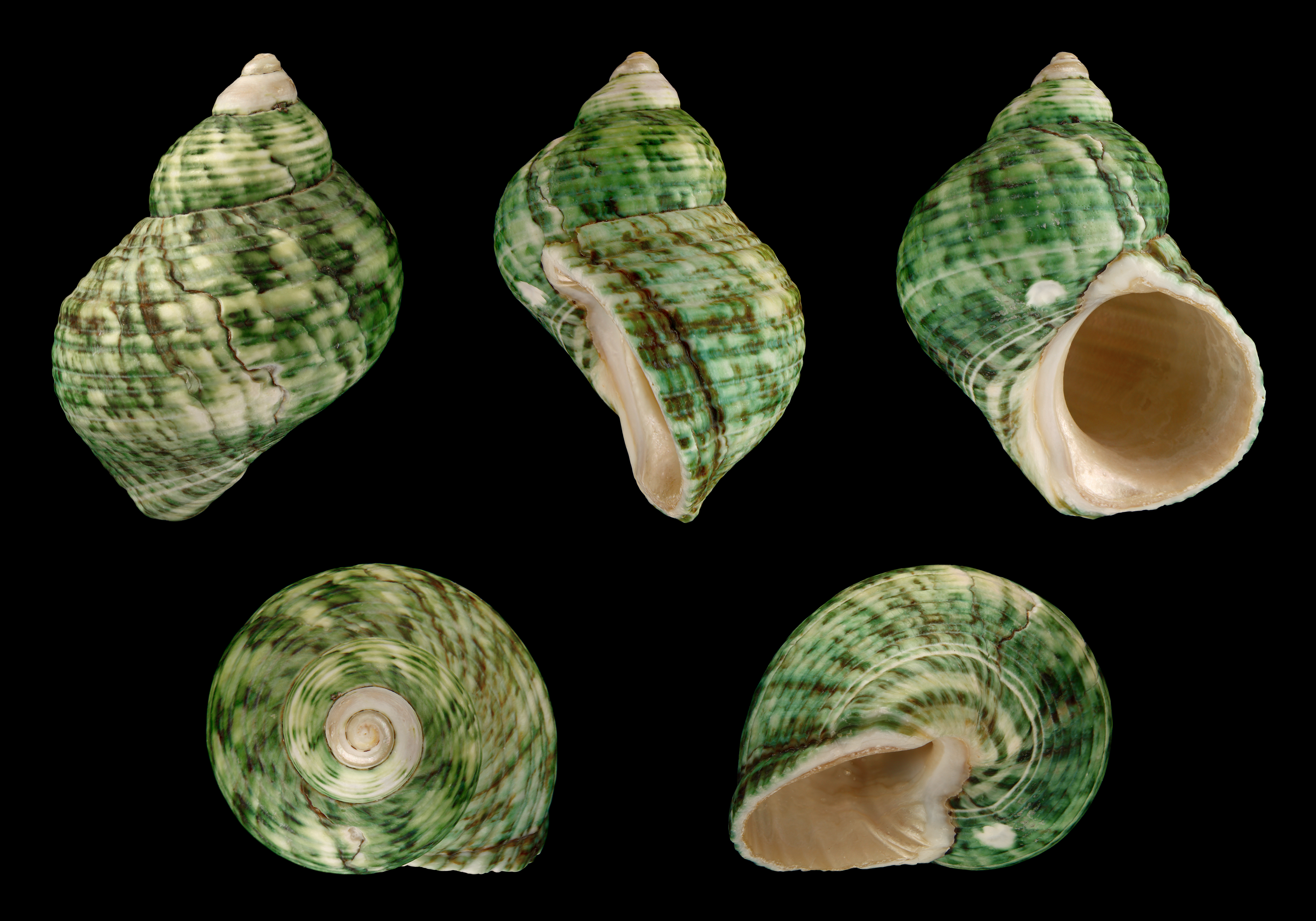
- Five views of a shell of Turbo sparverius

Scientific classification
- Kingdom: Animalia
- Phylum: Mollusca
- Class: Gastropoda
- Subclass: Vetigastropoda
- Order: Trochida
- Family: Turbinidae
- Genus: Turbo
- Species: T. sparverius

Binomial name
- Turbo sparverius Gmelin, 1791

Synonyms
- Turbo (Marmarostoma) sparverius Gmelin, 1791

= Turbo sparverius =

Species of gastropod

Turbo sparverius, common name the corded turban, is a species of sea snail, marine gastropod mollusk in the family Turbinidae.

The Australian Faunal Directory considers this species as a synonym of Turbo setosus Gmelin, 1791

== Description ==
The shell grows to a length of 75 mm. The solid, imperforate shell has an ovate- conic shape. Its color pattern is dirty white or greenish, maculate or tessellate with dark. The six whorls are convex, rounded, more or less angular around the upper part. They contain inconspicuous incremental striae and revolving lirae, which on the body whorl are wide and flattened with narrow interstices and are obsolete around the axis. The aperture measures over half the length of shell. It is white within, oval, angular above and below. The peristome is scarcely crenulated and is frequently greenish. The columella contains a heavy white callus, dilated and effuse at its base.

== Distribution ==
This marine species occurs in the southwest Pacific and off the Philippines.
