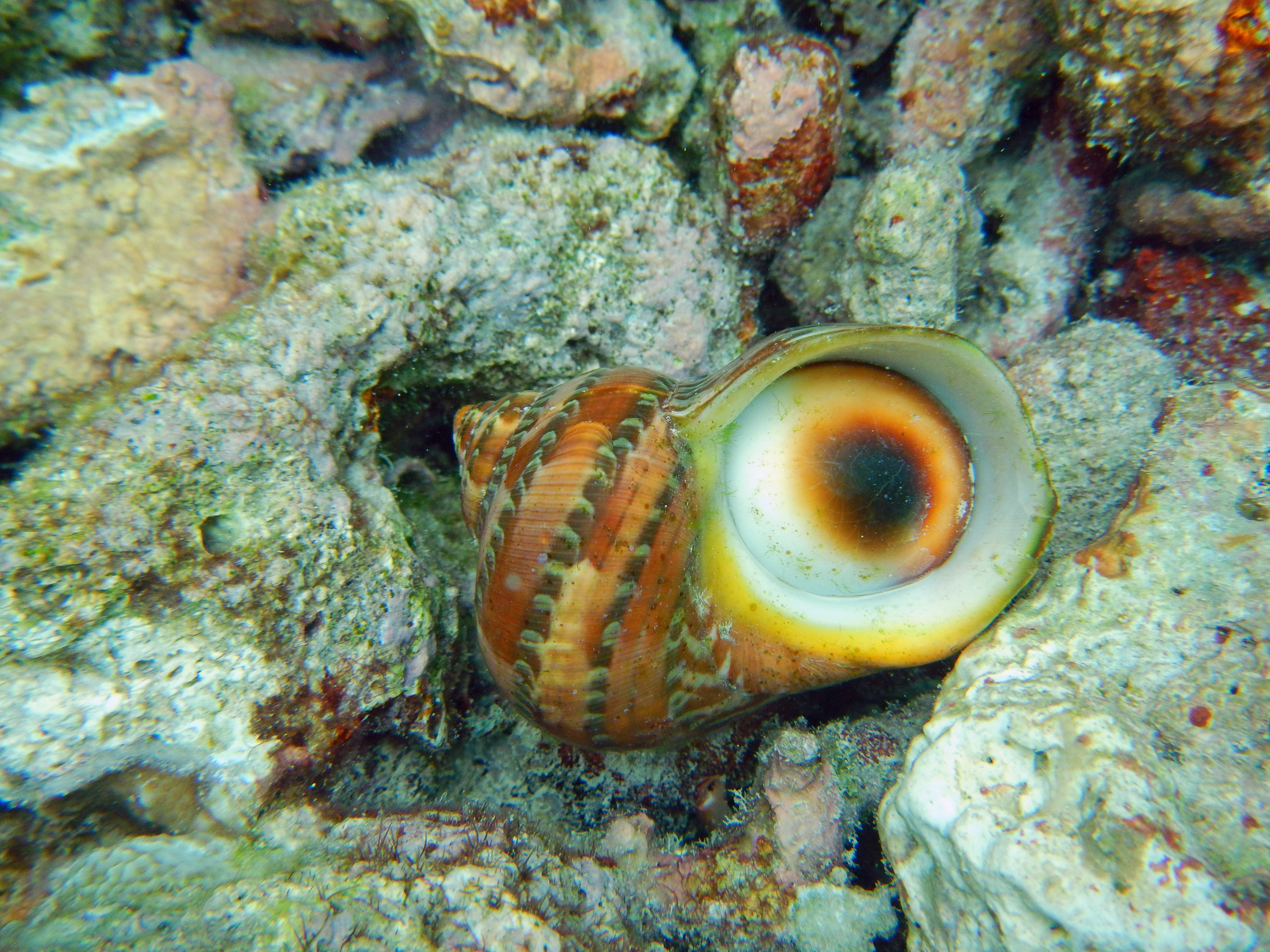
- Turbo petholatus

Scientific classification
- Kingdom: Animalia
- Phylum: Mollusca
- Class: Gastropoda
- Subclass: Vetigastropoda
- Order: Trochida
- Superfamily: Trochoidea
- Family: Turbinidae
- Genus: Turbo; Linnaeus, 1758

Type species
- Turbo petholatus Linnaeus, 1758

Synonyms
- Batillus Schumacher, 1817; Dinassovica Iredale, 1937; Fornax Jousseaume, 1888 (invalid: junior homonym of Fornax Laporte, 1835 [Coleoptera]); Halopsephus Rehder, 1943; Laeviturbo Cossmann, 1918; Lunatica Röding, 1798; Turbo (Aspilaturbo) S.T. Williams, 2008; Turbo (Batillus) Schumacher, 1817; Turbo (Callopoma) Gray, 1850; Turbo (Carswellena) Iredale, 1931; Turbo (Chaenoturbo) McLean, 1970; Turbo (Dinassovica) Iredale, 1937; Turbo (Emilioturbo) Ortea & Espinosa, 1996; Turbo (Euninella) Cotton, 1939; Turbo (Halopsephus) Rehder, 1943; Turbo (Lunatica) Röding, 1798; Turbo (Marmarostoma) Swainson, 1829; Turbo (Modelia) Gray, 1850; Turbo (Ocana) H. Adams, 1861; Turbo (Sarmaticus) Gray, 1847; Turbo (Senectus) Swainson, 1840; Turbo (Turbo) Linnaeus, 1758; Varostium Iredale, 1938

= Turbo (gastropod) =

Genus of molluscs

Turbo is a genus of large sea snails with gills and an operculum, marine gastropod molluscs in the family Turbinidae, the turban snails.

Turbo is the type genus of the family.

== Description ==
The shells of species in this genus are more or less highly conspiral, thick, about 20–200 mm, first whorls bicarinate, last whorl large often with strong spiral sculpture, knobs or spines, base convex, with or without umbilicus. Species in this genus have a round aperture and a solid, dome-shaped calcareous operculum. This circular operculum commences as a multispiral disc, like that of a Trochus, upon the outer side of which is deposited a thin calcareous layer by a lobe of the foot which projects partly over it. This arrangement produces an operculum which exhibits all the whorls beneath, but which is only feebly, or not obviously spiral above, from the more or less general distribution of the calcareous matter.

The radula is broad and generally rather short. The median, lateral and marginal teeth are always present, and the formula is invariably ∞.5.1.5.∞. The central teeth contain no cusps. The median tooth consists of a narrow oblong quadrate basal plate, frequently with accessory plates of various forms, to the lower end of which is attached the oval body of the tooth,—a simple plate without cusp, bearing supporting wings at the sides. Frequently the central teeth are asymmetrical in this group. The laterals bear supporting wings at their outer angles, and are various in form, with or without cusps. The inner marginals are very large, with large cusps.

The first Turbo species were found in the Upper Cretaceous, approximately 100 million years ago.

== Taxonomy ==
According to Alf et al. the genus Turbo is divided in 16 Recent subgenera. The number of presently known living species in Turbo is 66, plus five subspecies.

== Species ==
Species in the genus Turbo include:

- Turbo acutangulus Linnaeus, 1758 (taxon inquirendum)
- Turbo albofasciatus Bozzetti, 1994
- Turbo angelvaldesi Ortea & Espinosa, 1996
- Turbo argyrostomus Linnaeus, 1758 - Silver-mouth Turban
- Turbo artensis Montrouzier, 1860
- Turbo bozzettiana Bozzetti, 2011
- Turbo bruneus (Röding, 1798) - Brown Dwarf Turban
- Turbo cailletii P. Fischer & Bernardi, 1856 - Filose turban
- Turbo canaliculatus Hermann, 1781 - channeled turban
- Turbo castanea Gmelin, 1791 - Chestnut turban
- † Turbo chevalieri Magne & Vergneau-Saubade, 1971
- Turbo chrysostomus Linnaeus, 1758
- Turbo cidaris Gmelin, 1791 - Crown turban
- Turbo cornutus Lightfoot, 1786 - horned turban
- Turbo crassus W. Wood, 1828
- Turbo debesi Kreipl & Alf, 2000
- † Turbo embergeri Magne & Vergneau-Saubade, 1971
- Turbo euthymi Jousseaume, 1881
- Turbo excellens G. W. Sowerby III, 1914
- Turbo exquisitus Angas, 1877 - Equisite turban
- † Turbo fakaauensis Tröndlé & Letourneux, 2012
- † Turbo faurei Magne & Vergneau-Saubade, 1971
- † Turbo fittoni Basterot, 1825
- Turbo fluctuosus W. Wood, 1828 - Wavy turban
- Turbo funiculosus Kiener, 1848
- Turbo gemmatus Reeve, 1848
- † Turbo grangensis Pritchard, 1909
- † Turbo granulosus (Grateloup, 1827)
- Turbo gruneri Philippi, 1846 - Gruner's turban
- Turbo haraldi Robertson, 1957
- Turbo haynesi (Preston, 1914) - Hayne's turban
- Turbo heisei Prado, 1999
- Turbo heterocheilus Pilsbry, 1888
- Turbo histrio Reeve, 1848
- † Turbo histrioides Kase, Tomida, Inoue & Kadota, 2020
- Turbo hosodai Tomida & Kadota, 2014
- Turbo imperialis Gmelin, 1791
- Turbo intercostalis Menke, 1846 - Ribbed turban
- † Turbo ishidai Tomida, Sano & Kase, 2021
- † Turbo izuensis Kase, Tomida, Inoue & Kadota, 2020
- Turbo japonicus Reeve, 1848
- Turbo jonathani Dekker, Moolenbeck & Dance, 1992
- Turbo jourdani Kiener, 1839 - Jourdan's turban
- Turbo kenwilliamsi Williams, 2008 - Beautiful turban
- Turbo laetus Philippi, 1849
- Turbo lajonkairii (Deshayes, 1839)
- Turbo laminiferus Reeve, 1848 - crinkly turban
- † Turbo lesperonensis Magne & Vergneau-Saubade, 1971
- Turbo lorenzi Alf & Kreipl, 2015
- † Turbo maderensis Magne & Vergneau-Saubade, 1971
- Turbo magnificus Jonas, 1844 - Magifecent turban
- Turbo marisrubri Kreipl & Alf, 2001
- Turbo markusrufi Kreipl & Alf, 2003
- Turbo marmoratus Linnaeus, 1758 - Green turban
- † Turbo matsuzakiensis Tomida & Kadota, 2012
- Turbo mazatlanicus Pilsbry & H. N. Lowe, 1932
- † Turbo mekamiensis Nishiwada, 1894
- Turbo militaris Reeve, 1848 - Military turban
- † Turbo minoensis Itoigawa, 1960
- Turbo moluccensis Philippi, 1846
- Turbo moolenbeeki Dekkers & Dekker, 2016
- † Turbo moorei Hayward, 1981
- † Turbo multicarinatus Grateloup, 1832
- † Turbo neuvillei Cossmann & Peyrot, 1917
- † Turbo oryctus (Suter, 1917)
- † Turbo ozawai Otsuka, 1938 †
- †Turbo parvuloides Nomura, 1940
- Turbo petholatus Linnaeus, 1758
- Turbo radiatus Gmelin, 1791
- Turbo reevii Philippi, 1847 - Reeve's turban
- Turbo sandwicensis (Pease, 1861) - Hawaiian top shell
- † Turbo sanoi Tomida & Kadota, 2012
- Turbo sarmaticus Linnaeus, 1758 - South African turban, giant periwinkle, alikreukel
- Turbo saxosus W. Wood, 1828 - Stony turban
- Turbo sazae Fukuda, 2017
- Turbo scitulus (Dall, 1919) - Galapagos turban
- Turbo setosus Gmelin, 1791 - Rough turban
- Turbo smithi G.B. Sowerby III, 1886 - Miniature turban
- Turbo sparverius Gmelin, 1791 - Corded Turban
- Turbo squamiger Reeve, 1843
- Turbo stenogyrus P. Fischer, 1873 - Miniature turban
- † Turbo subsetosus d'Orbigny, 1852
- † Turbo tenisoni Finlay, 1927
- Turbo ticaonicus Reeve, 1848: synonym of Turbo bruneus (Röding, 1798)
- Turbo tuberculosus Quoy & Gaimard, 1834
- Turbo tursicus (Reeve, 1843)
- Turbo walteri Kreipl & Dekker, 2009
- † Turbo yoshiharuyabei Tomida & Kadota, 2012

== Synonyms ==
The following species were brought into synonymy:

Synonyms of Turbo
- Turbo aculeatus Allan, 1818: synonym of Epitonium muricatum (Risso, 1826)
- Turbo acutus Donovan, 1804: synonym of Turbonilla acuta (Donovan, 1804)
- Turbo aegyptius Gmelin, 1791: synonym of Rubritrochus declivis (Forsskål in Niebuhr, 1775)
- Turbo aereus Adams J., 1797: synonym of Rissoa parva (da Costa, 1778)
- Turbo aethiops Gmelin, 1791: synonym of Diloma aethiops (Gmelin, 1791)
- Turbo agonistes Dall & Ochsner, 1928: synonym of Turbo scitulus (Dall, 1919)
- Turbo albidus Kanmacher, 1798: synonym of Graphis albida (Kanmacher, 1798)
- Turbo albocinctus Link, 1807: synonym of Littorina saxatilis (Olivi, 1792)
- Turbo albulus Fabricius O., 1780: synonym of Menestho albula (Fabricius, 1780)
- Turbo albus Adams J., 1797: synonym of Rissoa parva (da Costa, 1778)
- Turbo amabilis Ozaki, 1954: synonym of Bolma guttata (A. Adams, 1863)
- Turbo amussitatus Gould, 1861: synonym of Homalopoma amussitatum (Gould, 1861)
- Turbo anguis Gmelin, 1791: synonym of Lunella undulata (Lightfoot, 1786)
- Turbo angulatus Eichwald, 1829: synonym of Gibbula adriatica (Philippi, 1844)
- Turbo anomala Röding, 1798: synonym of Turbo cidaris cidaris Gmelin, 1791
- Turbo archimedis Dillwyn, 1817: synonym of Turritella terebra (Linnaeus, 1758)
- Turbo argentata Röding, 1798: synonym of Turbo argyrostomus argyrostomus Linnaeus, 1758
- Turbo argenteus Anton, 1839: synonym of Turbo argyrostomus argyrostomus Linnaeus, 1758
- Turbo armatus Dillwyn, 1817: synonym of Bolma rugosa (Linnaeus, 1767)
- Turbo arsinoensis Issel, 1869: synonym of Collonista arsinoensis (Issel, 1869)
- Turbo aruginosa Röding, 1798: synonym of Turbo petholatus Linnaeus, 1758
- Turbo ascaris Turton, 1819: synonym of Aclis ascaris (Turton, 1819)
- Turbo assimilis Kiener, 1847: synonym of Turbo fluctuosus W. Wood, 1828
- Turbo asteriola Dall, 1925: synonym of Bolma bartschi Dall, 1913
- Turbo aurantius Kiener, 1847: synonym of Turbo smithi G.B. Sowerby III, 1886
- Turbo auriscalpium Linnaeus, 1758: synonym of Rissoa auriscalpium (Linnaeus, 1758)
- Turbo ayersi Olsson, 1967: synonym of Turbo castanea Gmelin, 1791
- Turbo bicarinatus Woodward, 1833: synonym of Littorina littorea (Linnaeus, 1758)
- Turbo bicarinatus G. B. Sowerby I, 1825: synonym of Trichotropis bicarinata (Sowerby I, 1825)
- Turbo boswellae Barnard, 1969: synonym of Cantrainea boswellae (Barnard, 1969)
- Turbo breviculus Philippi, 1847: synonym of Littorina brevicula (Philippi, 1844)
- Turbo briareus Dall, 1881: synonym of Arene briareus (Dall, 1881)
- Turbo brunneus Röding, 1798: synonym of Turbo bruneus (Röding, 1798)
- Turbo bryereus Montagu, 1803: synonym of Schwartziella bryerea (Montagu, 1803)
- Turbo caerulescens Lamarck, 1822: synonym of Melarhaphe neritoides (Linnaeus, 1758)
- Turbo calathiscus Montagu, 1808: synonym of Alvania cimex (Linnaeus, 1758)
- Turbo calcar Linnaeus, 1758: synonym of Astralium calcar (Linnaeus, 1758
- Turbo canaliculatus Gmelin, 1791: synonym of Turbo argyrostomus argyrostomus Linnaeus, 1758
- Turbo canalis Montagu, 1803: synonym of Lacuna vincta (Montagu, 1803)
- Turbo cancellatus da Costa, 1778: synonym of Alvania cancellata (da Costa, 1778)
- Turbo carduus P. Fischer, 1873: synonym of Turbo argyrostomus argyrostomus f. carduus P. Fischer, 1873 accepted as Turbo argyrostomus argyrostomus Linnaeus, 1758 (original rank)
- Turbo carinatus Woodward, 1833: synonym of Littorina littorea (Linnaeus, 1758)
- Turbo carinatus da Costa, 1778: synonym of Alvania carinata (da Costa, 1778)
- Turbo carinatus Cantraine, 1835: synonym of Cantrainea peloritana (Cantraine, 1835)
- Turbo cernicus G. B. Sowerby III, 1896: synonym of Turbo japonicus Reeve, 1848
- Turbo carneus Lowe, 1825: synonym of Margarites groenlandicus (Gmelin, 1791)
- Turbo chemnitzianus Reeve, 1848: synonym of Turbo radiatus Gmelin, 1791
- Turbo chinensis Ozawa & Tomida, 1995: synonym of Turbo cornutus [Lightfoot], 1786
- Turbo cimex Linnaeus, 1758: synonym of Alvania cimex (Linnaeus, 1758)
- Turbo cinereus Born, 1778: synonym of Lunella cinerea (Born, 1778)
- Turbo cinereus Couthouy, 1838: synonym of Margarites costalis (Gould, 1841)
- Turbo cingillus Montagu, 1803: synonym of Cingula trifasciata (J. Adams, 1800)
- Turbo cingulata Röding, 1798: synonym of Turbo petholatus Linnaeus, 1758
- Turbo circularis Reeve, 1848: synonym of Turbo gruneri Philippi, 1846
- Turbo classicarius J.E. Gray, 1850: synonym of Turbo sarmaticus Linnaeus, 1758
- Turbo clathratulus J. Adams, 1798: synonym of Epitonium clathratulum (Kanmacher, 1798)
- Turbo clathratulus Kanmacher, 1798: synonym of Epitonium clathratulum (Kanmacher, 1798)
- Turbo clathrus Linnaeus, 1758: synonym of Epitonium clathrus (Linnaeus, 1758)
- Turbo coccineus Megerle von Mühlfeld, 1816: synonym of Homalopoma sanguineum (Linnaeus, 1758)
- Turbo cochlus Gmelin, 1791: synonym of Turbo marmoratus Linnaeus, 1758
- Turbo confragosus Gould, 1851: synonym of Astralium confragosum (Gould, 1851)
- Turbo conoideus Brocchi, 1814: synonym of Megastomia conoidea (Brocchi, 1814)
- Turbo coreensis Recluz, 1853: synonym of Turbo granulatus Gmelin, 1791
- Turbo coronatus Gmelin, 1791: synonym of Lunella coronata (Gmelin, 1791)
- Turbo costatus Adams J., 1797: synonym of Manzonia crassa (Kanmacher, 1798)
- Turbo crassior Montagu, 1803: synonym of Lacuna crassior (Montagu, 1803)
- Turbo crassus Kanmacher, 1798: synonym of Manzonia crassa (Kanmacher, 1798)
- Turbo cremensis Andrzeiewsky, 1832: synonym of Gibbula adriatica (Philippi, 1844)
- Turbo crenatus Linnaeus, 1758: synonym of Opalia crenata (Linnaeus, 1758)
- Turbo creniferus Gmelin, 1791: synonym of Lunella coronata (Gmelin, 1791)
- Turbo crenulatus Gmelin, 1791: synonym of Turbo castanea Gmelin, 1791
- Turbo davidis Röding, 1798 : synonym of Littorina saxatilis (Olivi, 1792)
- Turbo declivis Forskål, 1775: synonym of Rubritrochus declivis (Forskål, 1775)
- Turbo decussatus Montagu, 1803 : synonym of Parthenina decussata (Montagu, 1803)
- Turbo delphinus Linnaeus, 1758: synonym of Angaria delphinus (Linnaeus, 1758)
- Turbo depressum Carpenter, 1856: synonym of Turbo funiculosus Kiener, 1848
- Turbo diminutus Link, 1807 : synonym of Littorina saxatilis (Olivi, 1792)
- Turbo dinegrata Rôding, 1798: synonym of Turbo petholatus Linnaeus, 1758
- Turbo discors Allan, 1818 : synonym of Alvania discors (Allan, 1818)
- Turbo discrepans Allan, 1818 : synonym of Alvania discors (Allan, 1818)
- Turbo distortus Linnaeus, 1758: synonym of Angaria delphinus (Linnaeus, 1758)
- Turbo divisus Adams J., 1797 : synonym of Ondina divisa (J. Adams, 1797)
- Turbo duplicatus Linnaeus, 1758: synonym of Turritella duplicata (Linnaeus, 1758)
- Turbo echinatus Gmelin, 1791: synonym of Turbo chrysostomus Linnaeus, 1758
- Turbo elegantissimus Montagu, 1803: synonym of Turbonilla lactea (Linnaeus, 1758)
- Turbo elevatus Eydoux & Souleyet, 1852: synonym of Prisogaster elevatus (Eydoux & Souleyet, 1852)
- Turbo elongatus Woodward, 1833: synonym of Littorina littorea (Linnaeus, 1758)
- Turbo euthymi Jousseaume, 1881: synonym of Turbo petholatus Linnaeus, 1758
- Turbo exoletus Linnaeus, 1758: synonym of Turritella exoleta (Linnaeus, 1758)
- Turbo expansus Brown in J. Smith, 1839: synonym of Littorina fabalis (Turton, 1825)
- Turbo fabalis Turton, 1825: synonym of Littorina fabalis (Turton, 1825)
- Turbo fasciata Renieri MS, Brocchi, 1814: synonym of Eulima glabra (da Costa, 1778)
- Turbo fasciatus Renieri, 1804: synonym of Eulima glabra (da Costa, 1778)
- Turbo ferrugineus Anton, 1839: synonym of Turbo argyrostomus argyrostomus Linnaeus, 1758
- Turbo filifer Deshayes, 1863: synonym of Leptothyra filifer (Deshayes, 1863)
- Turbo filosus W. Wood, 1828: synonym of Turbo cailletii P. Fischer & Bernardi, 1856
- Turbo flammeus Salis Marschlins, 1793: synonym of Tricolia pullus pullus (Linnaeus, 1758)
- Turbo fluctuatus Reeve, 1848: synonym of Turbo fluctuosus W. Wood, 1828
- Turbo fokkesi Jonas, 1843: synonym of Turbo fluctuosus W. Wood, 1828
- Turbo foliaceus Rousseau, 1854: synonym of Turbo lamniferus Reeve, 1848
- Turbo folicaeus Philippi, 1847: synonym of Turbo lamniferus Reeve, 1848
- Turbo fortispiralis Kreipl & Alf, 2003: synonym of Turbo smithi G.B. Sowerby III, 1886
- Turbo grandineus Valenciennes, 1846 : synonym of Calliostoma punctulatum (Martyn, 1784)
- Turbo granoliratus G.B. Sowerby III, 1908: synonym of Turbo moluccensis Philippi, 1846
- Turbo granosus (Martyn, 1784): synonym of Modelia granosa (Martyn, 1784)
- Turbo granulata (Röding, 1798): synonym of Turbo castanea Gmelin, 1791
- Turbo granulatus Gmelin, 1791: synonym of Lunella granulata (Gmelin, 1791)
- Turbo granulosus Gmelin, 1791: synonym of Turbo granulatus Gmelin, 1791
- Turbo graphicus Brown, 1818 : synonym of Cingula trifasciata (J. Adams, 1800)
- Turbo groenlandicus Röding, 1798 : synonym of Littorina saxatilis (Olivi, 1792)
- Turbo helicinus Phipps, 1774: synonym of Margarites helicinus (Phipps, 1774)
- Turbo helicoides Gmelin, 1791: synonym of Separatista helicoides (Gmelin, 1791)
- Turbo hemprichii Troschel, 1849: synonym of Lunella coronata (Gmelin, 1791)
- Turbo henicus Watson, 1885: synonym of Bolma henica (Watson, 1885)
- Turbo heteroclitus Kiener, 1847: synonym of Turbo torquatus Gmelin, 1791
- Turbo hippocastanum Lamarck, 1822: synonym of Turbo castanea Gmelin, 1791
- Turbo humerosa Smith, 1901: synonym of Turbo petholatus Linnaeus, 1758
- Turbo imbricatus Linnaeus, 1758: synonym of Turritella imbricata (Linnaeus, 1758)
- Turbo incarnatus Couthouy, 1838: synonym of Margarites groenlandicus (Gmelin, 1791)
- Turbo indistinctus Montagu, 1808: synonym of Parthenina indistincta (Montagu, 1808)
- Turbo indutus Watson, 1879: synonym of Homalopoma indutum (Watson, 1879)
- Turbo insculptus Montagu, 1808: synonym of Ondina divisa (J. Adams, 1797)
- Turbo interruptus Adams J., 1800: synonym of Rissoa parva (da Costa, 1778)
- Turbo interstinctus J. Adams, 1797: synonym of Chrysallida interstincta (J. Adams, 1797)
- Turbo irroratus Say, 1822: synonym of Littoraria irrorata (Say, 1822)
- Turbo japonicus Reeve, 1848: synonym of Turbo cornutus Lightfoot, 1786
- Turbo jugosus Montagu, 1803: synonym of Littorina saxatilis (Olivi, 1792)
- Turbo jungi Lai, 2006: synonym of Lunella jungi (Lai, 2006)
- Turbo labiatus Brown, 1827: synonym of Littorina arcana Hannaford-Ellis, 1978
- Turbo lacteus Linnaeus, 1758: synonym of Turbonilla lactea (Linnaeus, 1758)
- Turbo lacteus Donovan, 1804: synonym of Rissoa parva (da Costa, 1778)
- Turbo laetus Montrouzier in Souverbie & Montrouzier, 1863: synonym of Collonia granulosa Pease, 1868
- Turbo laevis Pennant, 1777: synonym of Melanella alba (da Costa, 1778)
- Turbo lamellosus Philippi, 1846: synonym of Turbo lamniferus Reeve, 1848
- Turbo lamellosus Broderip, 1831: synonym of Lunella torquata (Gmelin, 1791)
- Turbo lapidifera Röding, 1798: synonym of Turbo radiatus Gmelin, 1791
- Turbo lehmanni Menke, 1843: synonym of Notogibbula lehmanni (Menke, 1843)
- Turbo litoreus [sic]: synonym of Littorina littorea (Linnaeus, 1758)
- Turbo littoreus Linnaeus, 1758: synonym of Littorina littorea (Linnaeus, 1758)
- Turbo lucullanus Scacchi, 1833: synonym of Fossarus ambiguus (Linnaeus, 1758)
- Turbo ludus Gmelin, 1791: synonym of Lunella undulata (Lightfoot, 1786)
- Turbo lugubris Reeve, 1848: synonym of Lunella cinerea (Born, 1778)
- Turbo lugubris Kiener, 1847: synonym of Lunella ogasawarana Nakano, Takashashi & Ozawa, 2007
- Turbo macandrewii Mörch, 1868: synonym of Anadema macandrewii (Mörch, 1868)
- Turbo mammillatus Donovan, E., 1804: synonym of Turbo castanea Gmelin, 1791
- Turbo maoa Curtiss, 1938: synonym of Turbo setosus Gmelin, 1791
- Turbo martinii W. Wood, 1828: synonym of Amaea martinii (W. Wood, 1828)
- Turbo membranaceus Adams J., 1800: synonym of Rissoa membranacea (J. Adams, 1800)
- Turbo menkei Thiele, 1930: synonym of Turbo haynesi (Preston, 1914)
- Turbo mespilus Gmelin, 1791: synonym of Turbo imperialis Gmelin, 1791
- Turbo minimus W. Wood, 1828: synonym of Echinolittorina mespillum (Mühlfeld, 1824)
- Turbo minutus Michaud, 1828: synonym of Clathrella clathrata (Philippi, 1844)
- Turbo mitzschii Anton, 1838: synonym of Turbo saxosus W. Wood, 1828
- Turbo modestus Philippi, 1847: synonym of Lunella coronata (Gmelin, 1791)
- Turbo moltkianus Gmelin, 1791: synonym of Turbo castanea Gmelin, 1791
- Turbo moniliformis (Röding, 1798): synonym of Lunella moniliformis Röding, 1798
- Turbo monilis Turton, 1819: synonym of Alvania carinata (da Costa, 1778)
- Turbo muricatus Linnaeus, 1758: synonym of Cenchritis muricatus (Linnaeus, 1758)
- Turbo muricatus Nowell-Usticke, 1959: synonym of Turbo castanea Gmelin, 1791
- Turbo murreus Reeve, 1848: synonym of Isanda murrea (Reeve, 1848)
- Turbo naninus Souverbie in Souverbie & Montrouzier, 1864: synonym of Leptothyra nanina (Souverbie in Souverbie & Montrouzier, 1864)
- Turbo natalensis Krauss, 1848: synonym of Turbo cidaris natalensis (Krauss, 1848)
- Turbo nautileus Linnaeus, 1767: synonym of Gyraulus crista (Linnaeus, 1758)
- Turbo nebulosus Forsskål in Niebuhr, 1775: synonym of Monodonta nebulosa (Forsskål in Niebuhr, 1775)
- Turbo necnivosus Iredale, 1929: synonym of Turbo smithi G.B. Sowerby III, 1886
- Turbo neritiformis Brown, 1827: synonym of Littorina obtusata (Linnaeus, 1758)
- Turbo neritoides Linnaeus, 1758: synonym of Melarhaphe neritoides (Linnaeus, 1758)
- Turbo nicobaricus Gmelin, 1791: synonym of Chrysostoma paradoxum (Born, 1778)
- Turbo niger W. Wood, 1828: synonym of Prisogaster niger (W. Wood, 1828)
- Turbo nigerrimus Gmelin, 1791: synonym of Diloma nigerrima (Gmelin, 1791)
- Turbo nitidissimus Montagu, 1803: synonym of Ebala nitidissima (Montagu, 1803)
- Turbo nitzschii Anton, 1839: synonym of Turbo saxosus W. Wood, 1828
- Turbo nivosa Reeve, 1848: synonym of Turbo tuberculosus Quoy & Gaimard, 1834
- Turbo nivosus Montagu, 1803: synonym of Chrysallida nivosa (Montagu, 1803)
- Turbo obligatus Say, 1822: synonym of Littorina saxatilis (Olivi, 1792)
- Turbo obscura Röding, 1798: synonym of Turbo petholatus Linnaeus, 1758
- Turbo obscurus Couthouy, 1838: synonym of Solariella obscura (Couthouy, 1838)
- Turbo obsoletus Gmelin, 1791: synonym of Turritella exoleta (Linnaeus, 1758)
- Turbo obtusatus Linnaeus, 1758: synonym of Littorina obtusata (Linnaeus, 1758)
- Turbo olearius Linnaeus, 1758: synonym of Turbo marmoratus Linnaeus, 1758
- Turbo olivaceus Brown, 1827: synonym of Margarites olivaceus (Brown, 1827)
- Turbo ovalis da Costa, 1778: synonym of Acteon tornatilis (Linnaeus, 1758)
- Turbo palliatus Say, 1822: synonym of Littorina obtusata (Linnaeus, 1758)
- Turbo pallidus Donovan, 1804: synonym of Lacuna crassior (Montagu, 1803)
- Turbo pallidus Perry, G., 1811: synonym of Turbo argyrostomus Linnaeus, 1758
- Turbo papyraceus Gmelin, 1791: synonym of Pseudostomatella papyracea (Gmelin, 1791)
- Turbo parvulus Philippi, 1849: synonym of Turbo smithi G.B. Sowerby III, 1886
- Turbo parvus da Costa, 1778: synonym of Rissoa parva (da Costa, 1778)
- Turbo peloritanus Cantraine, 1835: synonym of Cantrainea peloritana (Cantraine, 1835)
- Turbo perdix Wood, 1828: synonym of Phasianella ventricosa Swainson, 1822
- Turbo permundus Iredale, 1929: synonym of Turbo argyrostomus argyrostomus Linnaeus, 1758
- Turbo pethiolatus Swainson, 1840: synonym of Turbo sarmaticus Linnaeus, 1758
- Turbo phasianellus Deshayes, 1863: synonym of Calliotrochus marmoreus (Pease, 1861)
- Turbo picta Röding, 1798: synonym of Lunella cinerea (Born, 1778)
- Turbo pictus da Costa, 1778: synonym of Tricolia pullus picta (da Costa, 1778)
- Turbo pileolum Reeve, 1842: synonym of Astralium pileolum (Reeve, 1842)
- Turbo planorbis Fabricius O., 1780: synonym of Skeneopsis planorbis (O. Fabricius, 1780)
- Turbo plicatus Megerle von Mühlfeld, 1824: synonym of Manzonia crassa (Kanmacher, 1798)
- Turbo plicatus Montagu, 1803: synonym of Odostomia plicata (Montagu, 1803)
- Turbo politus Linnaeus, 1758: synonym of Melanella polita (Linnaeus, 1758)
- Turbo ponsonbyi Sowerby III, 1897: synonym of Bothropoma ponsonbyi (Sowerby, 1897)
- Turbo porcatus Reeve, 1848: synonym of Lunella cinerea (Born, 1778)
- Turbo porphyrites Gmelin, 1791: synonym of Lunella cinerea (Born, 1778)
- Turbo porphyrites [sic, porphyria]: synonym of Turbo petholatus Linnaeus, 1758
- Turbo princeps Philippi, 1846: synonym of Turbo argyrostomus argyrostomus Linnaeus, 1758
- Turbo psittacinus Philippi, 1846: synonym of Turbo argyrostomus argyrostomus Linnaeus, 1758
- Turbo pulcher (Rehder, 1943): synonym of Turbo haraldi Robertson, 1957
- Turbo pulcher Reeve, 1842: synonym of Turbo kenwilliamsi Williams, 2008
- Turbo pulcherrimus Noodt, 1819: synonym of Calliostoma (Maurea) punctulatum (Martyn, 1784) represented as Calliostoma punctulatum (Martyn, 1784)
- Turbo pullus Linnaeus, 1758: synonym of Tricolia pullus (Linnaeus, 1758)
- Turbo pumiceus Brocchi, 1814: synonym of Cirsotrema cochlea (G. B. Sowerby II, 1844)
- Turbo punctatus Kanmacher, 1798: synonym of Marshallora adversa (Montagu, 1803)
- Turbo punctatus Gmelin, 1791: synonym of Echinolittorina punctata (Gmelin, 1791)
- Turbo punctura Montagu, 1803: synonym of Alvania punctura (Montagu, 1803)
- Turbo purpureus Risso, 1826: synonym of Clanculus cruciatus (Linnaeus, 1758)
- Turbo pustulata Reeve, 1843: synonym of Turbo squamiger Reeve, 1843
- Turbo pustulatus Reeve, 1848: synonym of Turbo squamiger Reeve, 1843
- Turbo puteolus Turton, 1819: synonym of Lacuna parva (da Costa, 1778)
- Turbo pyropus Reeve, 1848: synonym of Yaronia pyropus (Reeve, 1848)
- Turbo quadricarinatus Brocchi, 1814: synonym of Mathilda quadricarinata (Brocchi, 1814)
- Turbo quadrifasciatus Montagu, 1803: synonym of Lacuna vincta (Montagu, 1803)
- Turbo radiatus Reeve, 1848: synonym of Turbo intercostalis Menke, 1846
- Turbo radina Webster, 1905: synonym of Turbo smaragdus Gmelin, 1791
- Turbo replicatus Linnaeus, 1758: synonym of Turritella duplicata (Linnaeus, 1758)
- Turbo reticulatus J. Adams, 1797: synonym of Alvania beanii (Hanley in Thorpe, 1844)
- Turbo reticulatus Montagu, 1803: synonym of Alvania beanii (Hanley in Thorpe, 1844)
- Turbo reticulatus Donovan, 1804: synonym of Marshallora adversa (Montagu, 1803)
- Turbo retusus Lamarck, 1822: synonym of Littorina obtusata (Linnaeus, 1758)
- Turbo rissoanus Delle Chiaje, 1828: synonym of Rissoa variabilis (Von Mühlfeldt, 1824)
- Turbo ruber J. Adams, 1797: synonym of Barleeia unifasciata (Montagu, 1803)
- Turbo rubicundus Chemnitz: synonym of Turbo granosus (Martyn, 1784)
- Turbo rudis Maton, 1797: synonym of Littorina saxatilis (Olivi, 1792)
- Turbo rudissimus Johnston, 1842: synonym of Littorina saxatilis (Olivi, 1792)
- Turbo rugosus Linnaeus, 1767: synonym of Bolma rugosa (Linnaeus, 1767)
- Turbo rugosus Brown, 1818: synonym of Tornus subcarinatus (Montagu, 1803)
- Turbo sangarensis Schrenck, 1861: synonym of Homalopoma sangarense (Schrenck, 1861)
- Turbo sanguineus de Folin, 1868: synonym of Collonista purpurata (Deshayes, 1863)
- Turbo sanguineus Linnaeus, 1758: synonym of Homalopoma sanguineum (Linnaeus, 1758)
- Turbo saxatilis Olivi, 1792: synonym of Littorina saxatilis (Olivi, 1792)
- Turbo scabrosus Preston, 1914: synonym of Turbo lamniferus Reeve, 1848
- Turbo scalaris Linnaeus, 1758: synonym of Epitonium scalare (Linnaeus, 1758)
- Turbo semicostatus Pease, 1861: synonym of Turbo argyrostomus argyrostomus Linnaeus, 1758
- Turbo semicostatus Montagu, 1803: synonym of Onoba semicostata (Montagu, 1803)
- Turbo semilugubris Deshayes, 1863: synonym of Vaceuchelus semilugubris (Deshayes, 1863)
- Turbo semistriatus Montagu, 1808: synonym of Crisilla semistriata (Montagu, 1808)
- Turbo separatista Dillwyn, 1817: synonym of Separatista helicoides (Gmelin, 1791)
- Turbo seruiensis Smits & Moolenbeek, 1995: synonym of Turbo moluccensis Philippi, 1846
- Turbo shandi Hutton, 1873: synonym of Turbo granosus (Martyn, 1784)
- Turbo shepeianus J. Adams, 1798: synonym of Onoba semicostata (Montagu, 1803)
- Turbo shepeianus Kanmacher, 1798: synonym of Onoba semicostata (Montagu, 1803)
- Turbo siamea Röding, 1798: synonym of Turbo cornutus Lightfoot, 1786
- Turbo siculus Brugnone, 1850: synonym of Echinolittorina punctata (Gmelin, 1791)
- Turbo smaragdus Gmelin, 1791: synonym of Lunella smaragdus (Gmelin, 1791)
- Turbo somnueki Patamakanthin, 2001: synonym of Turbo tursicus (Reeve, 1843)
- Turbo speciosus Mühlfeld, 1824: synonym of Tricolia speciosa (Mühlfeld, 1824)
- Turbo speciosus Reeve, 1848: synonym of Turbo argyrostomus perspeciosus (Iredale, 1929)
- Turbo spenglerianus Gmelin, 1791: synonym of Turbo canaliculatus Hermann, 1781
- Turbo spinosus Gmelin, 1791: synonym of Turbo radiatus Gmelin, 1791
- Turbo spiralis Montagu, 1803: synonym of Chrysallida pellucida (Dillwyn, 1817)
- Turbo splendidulus G.B. Sowerby III, 1886: synonym of Turbo laetus Philippi, 1849
- Turbo squamosa Röding, 1798: synonym of Turbo bruneus (Röding, 1798)
- Turbo squamosus J.E. Gray, 1847: synonym of Turbo lamniferus Reeve, 1848
- Turbo stamineus Martyn, 1784: synonym of Turbo torquatus Gmelin, 1791
- Turbo stellaris Gmelin, 1791: synonym of Astralium stellare (Gmelin, 1791)
- Turbo striatulus da Costa, 1778: synonym of Alvania carinata (da Costa, 1778)
- Turbo striatulus Montagu, 1803: synonym of Alvania carinata (da Costa, 1778)
- Turbo striatulus Linnaeus, 1758: synonym of Turbonilla striatula (Linnaeus, 1758)
- Turbo striatus J. Adams, 1797: synonym of Onoba semicostata (Montagu, 1803)
- Turbo subcastaneus Pilsbry, 1888: synonym of Turbo squamiger Reeve, 1843
- Turbo subluteus Adams J., 1797: synonym of Rissoa parva (da Costa, 1778)
- Turbo subtruncatus Montagu, 1803: synonym of Truncatella subcylindrica (Linnaeus, 1767)
- Turbo subulatus Donovan, 1804: synonym of Eulima glabra (da Costa, 1778)
- Turbo subumbilicatus Montagu, 1803: synonym of Peringia ulvae (Pennant, 1777)
- Turbo sulcatus Woodward, 1833: synonym of Littorina littorea (Linnaeus, 1758)
- Turbo sulcatus Leach, 1852: synonym of Littorina compressa Jeffreys, 1865
- Turbo taeniatus G.B. Sowerby I, 1825: synonym of Photinastoma taeniatum (G. B. Sowerby I, 1825)
- Turbo tautiranus Curtiss, 1938: synonym of Littoraria coccinea (Gmelin, 1791)
- Turbo taylorianus E.A. Smith, 1880: synonym of Bolma tayloriana (E. A. Smith, 1880)
- Turbo tenebrosus Montagu, 1803: synonym of Littorina saxatilis (Olivi, 1792)
- Turbo terebellum Dillwyn, 1817: synonym of Niso terebellum (Dillwyn, 1817)
- Turbo terebra Linnaeus, 1758: synonym of Turritella terebra (Linnaeus, 1758)
- Turbo tessellatus Kiener, 1848: synonym of Turbo fluctuosus W. Wood, 1828
- Turbo torcularis Born, 1778: synonym of Turritella exoleta (Linnaeus, 1758)
- Turbo torquatus Gmelin, 1791: synonym of Lunella torquata (Gmelin, 1791)
- Turbo tricarinulatus Euthyme, 1885: synonym of Turbo cidaris cidaris Gmelin, 1791
- Turbo tricolor Risso, 1826: synonym of Melarhaphe neritoides (Linnaeus, 1758)
- Turbo tricostatus Hutton, 1884: synonym of Lunella smaragdus (Gmelin, 1791)
- Turbo trifasciatus J. Adams, 1800: synonym of Cingula cingillus (Montagu, 1803)
- Turbo trochiformis Born, 1778: synonym of Trochita trochiformis (Born, 1778)
- Turbo trochoides Reeve, 1848: synonym of Lunella coronata (Gmelin, 1791)
- Turbo truncatus Montagu, 1803: synonym of Truncatella subcylindrica (Linnaeus, 1767)
- Turbo tuberculata Röding, 1798: synonym of Turbo squamiger Reeve, 1843
- Turbo tuberculatus W. Wood, 1828: synonym of Tectarius antonii (Philippi, 1846)
- Turbo tuberculatus Kiener, 1847: synonym of Turbo radiatus Gmelin, 1791
- Turbo tumidulus Reeve, 1848: synonym of Turbo radiatus Gmelin, 1791
- Turbo turbinopsis Lamarck, 1822: synonym of Turbo lamniferus Reeve, 1848
- Turbo turriformis Preston, 1914: synonym of Turbo lamniferus Reeve, 1848
- Turbo turtonis Turton, 1819: synonym of Epitonium turtonis (Turton, 1819)
- Turbo ulvae Pennant, 1777: synonym of Peringia ulvae (Pennant, 1777)
- Turbo undulata Röding, 1798: synonym of Turbo marmoratus Linnaeus, 1758
- Turbo undulatus Lightfoot, 1786: synonym of Lunella undulata (Lightfoot, 1786)
- Turbo ungulinus Linnaeus, 1758: synonym of Turritella ungulina (Linnaeus, 1758)
- Turbo unicus Montagu, 1803: synonym of Graphis albida (Kanmacher, 1798)
- Turbo unidentatus Montagu, 1803: synonym of Odostomia unidentata (Montagu, 1803)
- Turbo unifasciatus Montagu, 1803: synonym of Barleeia unifasciata (Montagu, 1803)
- Turbo ustulatus Lamarck, 1822: synonym of Littorina littorea (Linnaeus, 1758)
- Turbo variegatus Linnaeus, 1758: synonym of Turritella variegata (Linnaeus, 1758)
- Turbo venezuelensis Weisbord, 1962: synonym of Turbo castanea Gmelin, 1791
- Turbo ventricosus Woodward, 1833: synonym of Littorina littorea (Linnaeus, 1758)
- Turbo ventrosus Montagu, 1803: synonym of Ecrobia ventrosa (Montagu, 1803)
- Turbo venustus Philippi, 1845: synonym of Turbo saxosus W. Wood, 1828
- Turbo verconis Iredale, 1937: synonym of Turbo jourdani Kiener, 1839
- Turbo vericulum Röding, 1798: synonym of Turbo setosus Gmelin, 1791
- Turbo vermicularis Brocchi, 1814: synonym of Turritella vermicularis (Brocchi, 1814)
- Turbo versicolor Nowell-Usticke, 1959: synonym of Turbo castanea Gmelin, 1791
- Turbo versicolor Gmelin, 1791: synonym of Lunella cinerea (Born, 1778)
- Turbo vestitus Say, 1822: synonym of Littorina saxatilis (Olivi, 1792)
- Turbo vieuxi Payraudeau, 1826: synonym of Tricolia speciosa (Megerle von Mühlfeld, 1824)
- Turbo vinctus Montagu, 1803: synonym of Lacuna vincta (Montagu, 1803)
- Turbo virens Anton, 1839: synonym of Turbo castanea Gmelin, 1791
- Turbo viridana Röding, 1798: synonym of Lunella coronata (Gmelin, 1791)
- Turbo viridicallus (Jousseaume, 1898): synonym of Lunella viridicallus (Jousseaume, 1898)
- Turbo vitreus Montagu, 1803: synonym of Hyala vitrea (Montagu, 1803)
- Turbo vittatus Donovan, 1804: synonym of Cingula trifasciata (J. Adams, 1800)
- Turbo zebra Wood, 1828: synonym of Echinolittorina peruviana (Lamarck, 1822)
- Turbo zebra Donovan, 1825: synonym of Littoraria zebra (Donovan, 1825)
- Turbo zetlandicus Montagu, 1815: synonym of Alvinia zetlandica Montagu, 1815

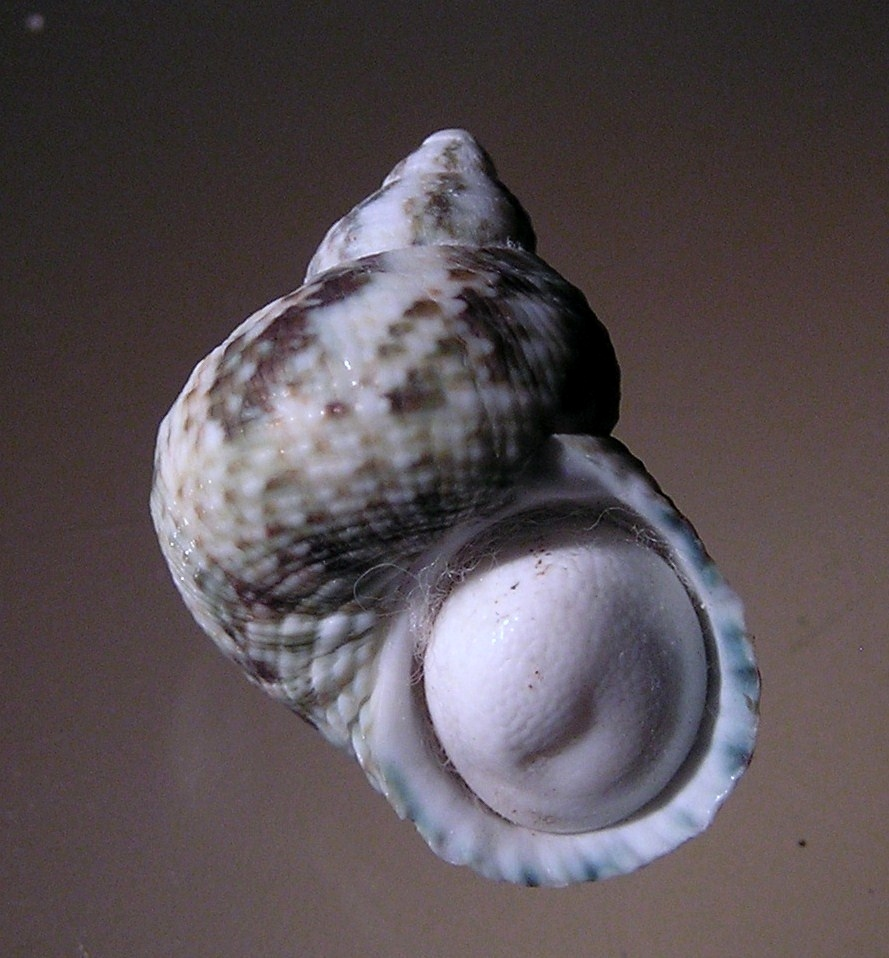
Shell and operculum of Turbo tuberculosus

The following species are nomina nuda (names not published with an adequate description):

- Turbo curvatus Chiereghini MS, Brusina, 1870 (nomen nudum): accepted as Eulima philippii Weinkauff, 1868

The following species are alternate representation:

- Turbo setosus Gmelin, 1843 represented as Turbo setosus Gmelin, 1791 (alternate representation)

The following species are nomina dubia (names of unknown or doubtful application):

- Turbo articulatus Reeve, 1848 (nomen dubium)
- Turbo concinnus Philippi, 1846 (nomen dubium)
- Turbo crellenus Linnaeus, 1758 (nomen dubium)
- Turbo disjunctus Anton, 1838 (nomen dubium)
- Turbo elegans Philippi, 1846 (nomen dubium)
- Turbo margaritaceus Linnaeus, 1758 (nomen dubium)
- Turbo pustulatus Brocchi, 1821 (nomen dubium)
- Turbo variabilis Reeve, 1842 (nomen dubium)

Temporary names:

- † Turbo geniculatus Brocchi, 1814

The following species are species inquirenda (names with uncertain or disputed validity):

- Turbo regenfusii Deshayes, 1843 - great green turban

== Human uses ==
When the Caribbean hermit crab, Coenobita clypeatus, or "purple pincher" as it is known in the pet trade is kept as a house pet, Turbo shells are a favorite choice of shells for the crab.

Turbo cornutus, common name the "horned turban", is an expensive food item in Korea, and Japan, where they are known as sazae.

The attractively colored operculum of at least two different Turbo species has been used for various decorative purposes, including in jewelry and buttons. These opercula are sometimes known as "cat's eyes".
