= Turbo marisrubri =

Scientific classification
- Kingdom: Animalia
- Phylum: Mollusca
- Class: Gastropoda
- Subclass: Vetigastropoda
- Order: Trochida
- Family: Turbinidae
- Genus: Turbo
- Species: T. marisrubri

Binomial name
- Turbo marisrubri Kreipl & Alf, 2001

Synonyms
- Turbo (Aspilaturbo) marisrubri Kreipl & Alf, 2001

Species of gastropod

Turbo marisrubri is a species of sea snail, a marine gastropod mollusk in the family Turbinidae, the turban snails.

== Description ==
The shell grows to a length of 25 mm.

== Distribution ==
This species occurs in the Red Sea.
