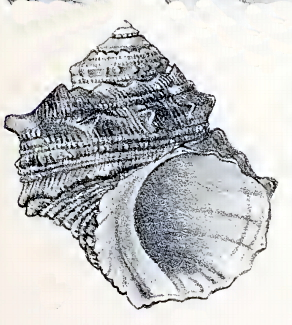
- Drawing with an apertural view of a shell of Turbo saxosus

Scientific classification
- Kingdom: Animalia
- Phylum: Mollusca
- Class: Gastropoda
- Subclass: Vetigastropoda
- Order: Trochida
- Family: Turbinidae
- Genus: Turbo
- Species: T. saxosus

Binomial name
- Turbo saxosus Wood, 1828

Synonyms
- Turbo (Callopoma) saxosus W. Wood, 1828; Turbo mitzschii Anton, 1838; Turbo nitzschii Anton, 1839; Turbo venustus Philippi, 1845

= Turbo saxosus =

Species of gastropod

Turbo saxosus, common name the stony turban, is a species of sea snail, marine gastropod mollusk in the family Turbinidae.

- Taxonomic status: Some authors place the name in the subgenus Turbo (Callopoma) .

== Description ==
The length of the shell ranges from 20 mm and 54 mm. The imperforate shell has an ovate-conic shape. Its color pattern varies and may be brown, olive or gray. The upper surface is marked with radiating patterns, while lower surface is irregularly maculated with snowy white. Some specimens are dark, unicolored. The conic spire is acute. The suture is canaliculate. The 5–6 whorls are lamellosely densely striate and spirally irregularly lirate. They are carinated, usually more or less nodose at the shoulder, and bear a subsutural series of stout erect tubercles. The rounded aperture measures half the length of the shell. It is white and iridescent within. The arched columella is callous, concave. It has a deep semilunar longitudinal groove and is slightly produced at its base.

The operculum is rounded oval, flat and dark chestnut inside, with four or five whorls and a subcentral nucleus. Its outer surface is convex, white, middle portion coarsely granulose, with a deep narrow central pit, bounded by a deep concentric farrow not continuous over the margin of increment, outside of which are three narrow minutely beaded concentric ridges. The margin of increment is granulose.

It is an extremely variable species. Frequently several tuberculate lirae encircle the base, and in this strongly nodose variety, the incremental striae are usually inconspicuous. In another form the spiral lirae are not noticeably tuberculate.

== Distribution ==
This species occurs in the Pacific Ocean from Panama to Peru.
