= Turbo moorei =

Scientific classification
- Kingdom: Animalia
- Phylum: Mollusca
- Class: Gastropoda
- Subclass: Vetigastropoda
- Order: Trochida
- Superfamily: Trochoidea
- Family: Turbinidae
- Genus: Turbo
- Species: †T. moorei

Binomial name
- †Turbo moorei Hayward, 1981

Synonyms
- Turbo (Marmarostoma) moorei Hayward, 1981

Extinct species of gastropod

Turbo moorei is an extinct species of sea snail, a marine gastropod mollusk, in the family Turbinidae, the turban snails.
