= Turbo markusrufi =

Scientific classification
- Kingdom: Animalia
- Phylum: Mollusca
- Class: Gastropoda
- Subclass: Vetigastropoda
- Order: Trochida
- Family: Turbinidae
- Genus: Turbo
- Species: T. markusrufi

Binomial name
- Turbo markusrufi Kreipl & Alf, 2003

Synonyms
- Turbo (Marmarostoma) markusrufi Kreipl & Alf, 2003

Species of gastropod

Turbo (Marmarostoma) markusrufi is a species of sea snail, marine gastropod mollusk in the family Turbinidae.

== Description ==
The shell grows to a length of 35 mm.

== Distribution ==
This marine species occurs at subtidal depths off the Philippines and in the Western Pacific off Palau.
