= Turbo haraldi =

Scientific classification
- Kingdom: Animalia
- Phylum: Mollusca
- Class: Gastropoda
- Subclass: Vetigastropoda
- Order: Trochida
- Family: Turbinidae
- Genus: Turbo
- Species: T. haraldi

Binomial name
- Turbo haraldi Robertson, 1957

Synonyms
- Halopsephus pulcher Rehder, 1943 (invalid name, junior secondary homonym of Turbo pulcher Reeve, 1842; Turbo haraldi is a replacement name); Turbo (Halopsephus) haraldi Robertson, 1957; Turbo pulcher (Rehder, 1943)

Species of gastropod

Turbo haraldi is a species of sea snail, marine gastropod mollusk in the family Turbinidae.

== Distribution ==
Distribution of Turbo haraldi include Belize, Caribbean Sea, Colombia, Lesser Antilles and Panama.

== Description ==
The maximum recorded shell length is 25 mm.

== Habitat ==
Minimum recorded depth is 50 m. Maximum recorded depth is 100 m.
