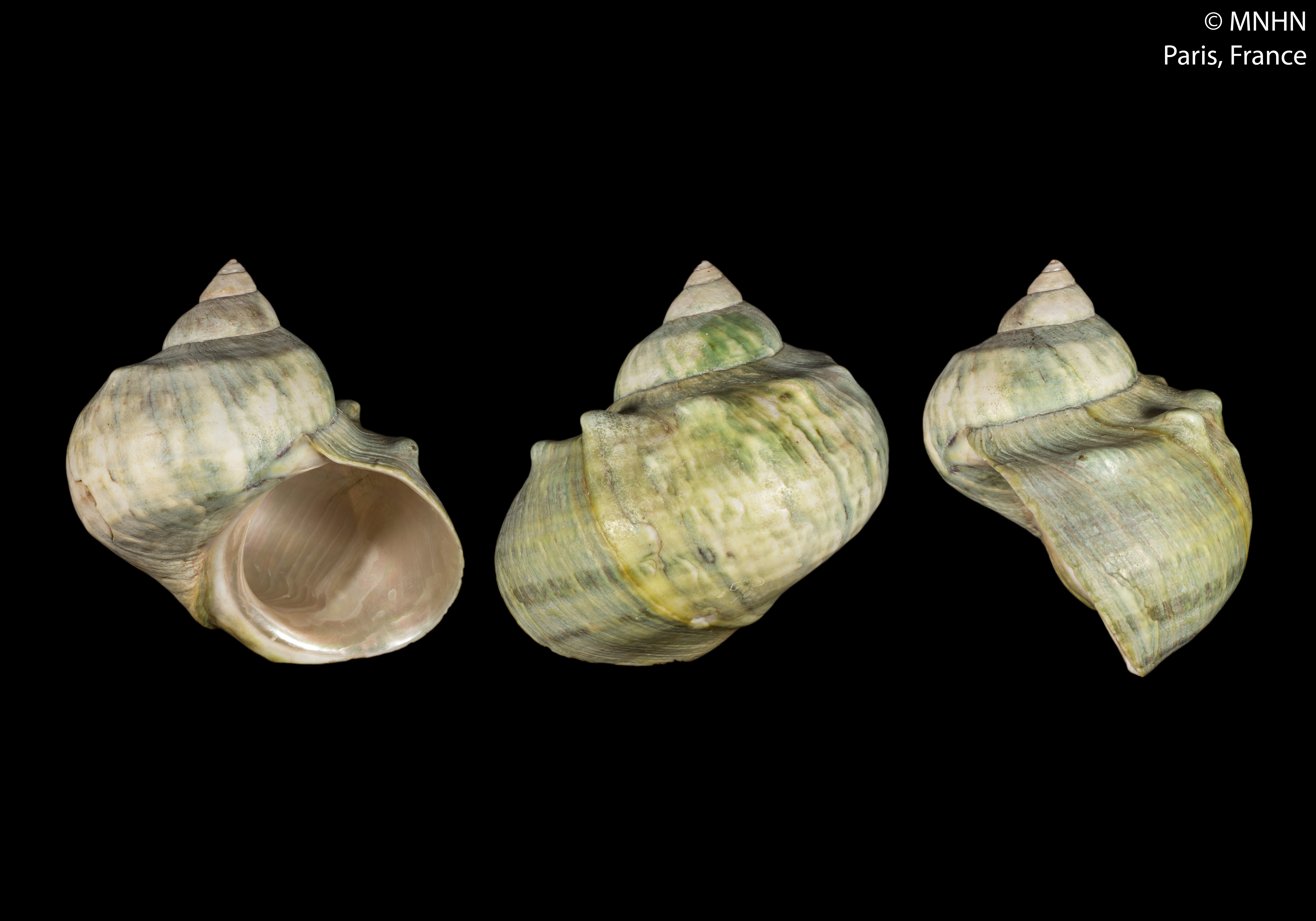
- Shell of Turbo regenfusii (syntype at MNHN, Paris)

Scientific classification
- Kingdom: Animalia
- Phylum: Mollusca
- Class: Gastropoda
- Subclass: Vetigastropoda
- Order: Trochida
- Family: Turbinidae
- Genus: Turbo
- Species: T. regenfusii

Binomial name
- Turbo regenfusii Deshayes, 1843

Synonyms
- Turbo imperialis regenfusii Deshayes, 1843 (uncertain synonymy)

= Turbo regenfusii =

Species of gastropod

Turbo regenfusii, common name: the great green turban, is a species of sea snail, a marine gastropod mollusk in the family Turbinidae, the turban snails.

This is a species inquirenda and is also considered a synonym of Turbo (Lunatica) marmoratus Linnaeus, C., 1758

== Description ==
The length of the shell attains 220 mm.

== Distribution ==
This species occurs in the Indian Ocean off Madagascar; also off the Fiji Islands.
