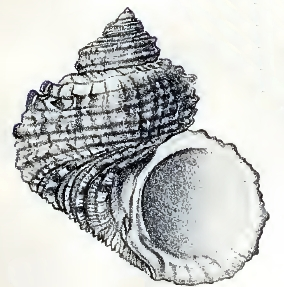
- Drawing of a shell of Turbo laminiferus

Scientific classification
- Kingdom: Animalia
- Phylum: Mollusca
- Class: Gastropoda
- Subclass: Vetigastropoda
- Order: Trochida
- Family: Turbinidae
- Genus: Turbo
- Species: T. laminiferus

Binomial name
- Turbo laminiferus Reeve, 1848

Synonyms
- Turbo foliaceus Rousseau, 1854; Turbo folicaeus Philippi, 1847; Turbo foliaceus scabrosus Preston, 1914; Turbo foliaceus turriformis Preston, 1914; Turbo lamellosus Philippi, 1846; Turbo scabrosus Preston, 1914; Turbo squamosus J.E. Gray, 1847; Turbo turbinopsis Lamarck, 1822; Turbo turriformis Preston, 1914; Turbo (Marmarostoma) squamosus Gray, J.E. in Jukes, 1847

= Turbo laminiferus =

Species of gastropod

Turbo laminiferus, common name the crinkly turban, is a species of sea snail, marine gastropod mollusk in the family Turbinidae.

Some authors place the name in the subgenus Turbo (Marmarostoma)

== Description ==
The length of the shell varies between 20 mm and 50 mm. The solid, umbilicate shell has a pointed-ovate shape. Its color pattern is greenish, longitudinally flammulated with black. The conic spire is pointed. The six whorls are very convex, separated by canaliculate sutures. The body whorl has about nine rather separated lirae, the whole surface covered with crowded elevated sibfoliaceus radiating lamellae. The round aperture measures half the length of the shell or less. The peristome is usually nearly free from body whorl above. The columella is excavated at the deep and prominent umbilicus.

The operculum has a subcentral nucleus. Its outer surface is green, granulate, wrinkled on its outer margin, with a radial sulcus marking the limit of the margin of increment.

== Distribution ==
This marine species occurs from Western Australia to Queensland, Australia; and off Papua New Guinea
