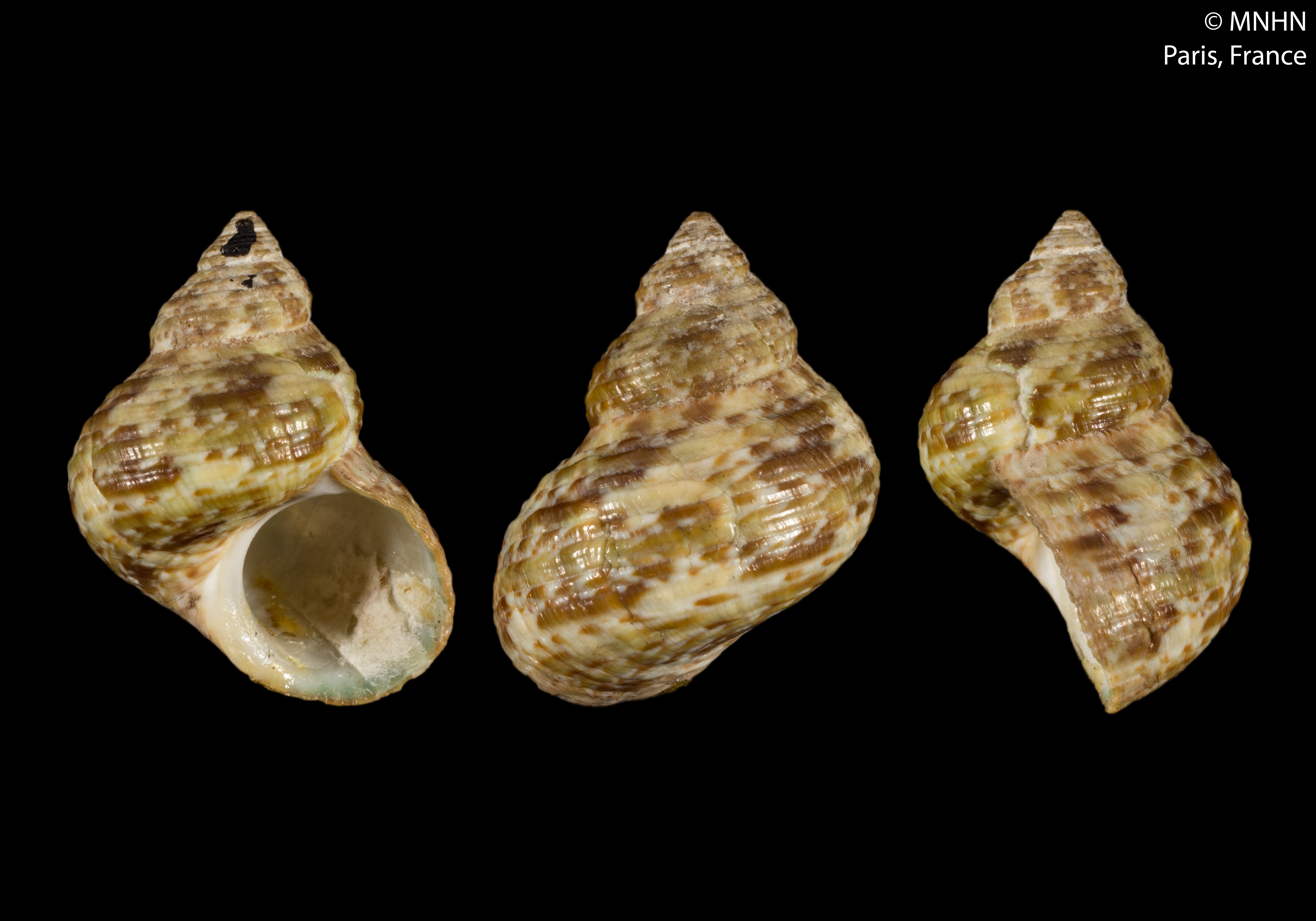
- Shell of Turbo stenogyrus (syntype at MNHN, Paris)

Scientific classification
- Kingdom: Animalia
- Phylum: Mollusca
- Class: Gastropoda
- Subclass: Vetigastropoda
- Order: Trochida
- Family: Turbinidae
- Genus: Turbo
- Species: T. stenogyrus

Binomial name
- Turbo stenogyrus P. Fischer, 1873

Synonyms
- Marmarostoma stenogyrum (P. Fischer, 1873); Turbo (Marmarostoma) stenogyrus (P. Fischer, 1873); Turbo (Taeniaturbo) parvulus Philippi, R.A., 1849

= Turbo stenogyrus =

Species of gastropod

Turbo stenogyrus, common name the miniature turban, is a species of sea snail, marine gastropod mollusk in the family Turbinidae.

- Taxonomic status: Some authors place the name in the subgenus Turbo (Marmarostoma)

== Description ==
The length of the shell varies between 10 mm and 35 mm. The acute, elongate, imperforate shell has an ovate-conic shape. The six whorls are rounded, transversely lirate, radiate and finely striate. The body whorlscarcely exceeds the balance of the shell in length. The suture is margined. The lirae are narrow. Below the shell has flat ribs. The interstices and below the suture are striate. The circular aperture is silvery within. The columella is regularly arcuate and not produced at its base. The color pattern of the shell is pale green, with chestnut maculations, the lirae are white and brown articulated.

This species is host to the ectoparasitic copepod Parapanaietis turbo Hoshina & Kuwabara, 1958

== Distribution ==
This species occurs in the southwest Pacific and off Japan, the Philippines and Indonesia.
