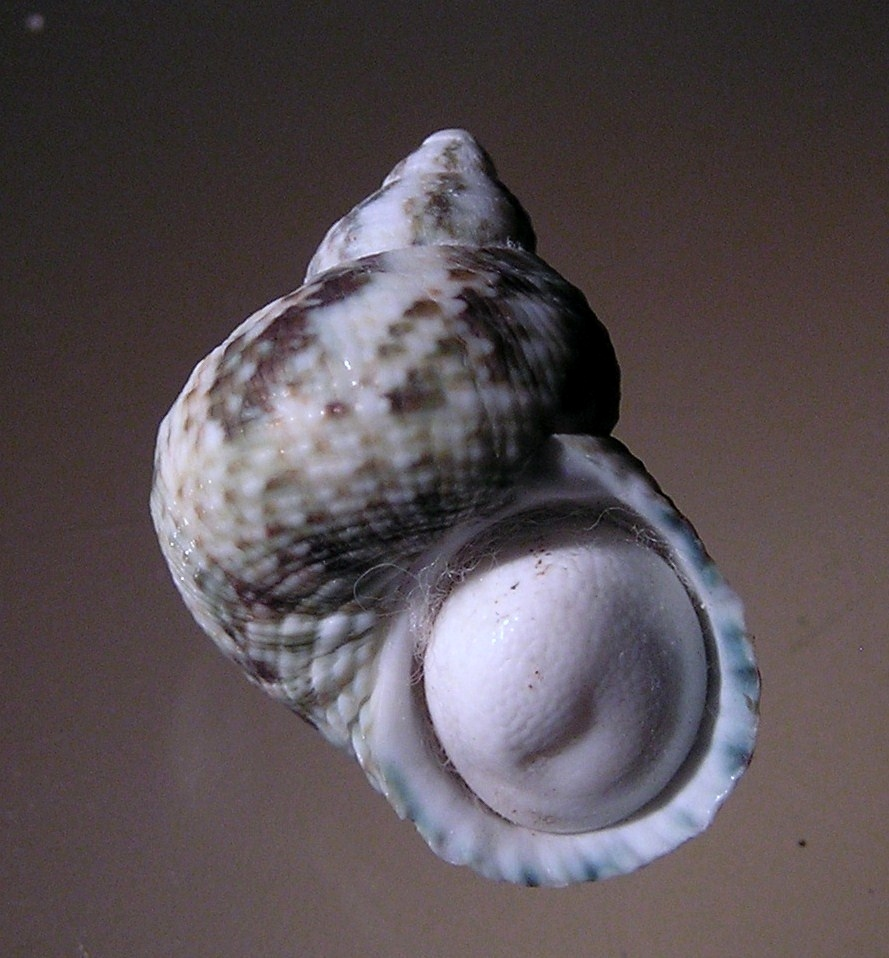
- Apertural view of a shell of Turbo tuberculosus with the operculum in place

Scientific classification
- Kingdom: Animalia
- Phylum: Mollusca
- Class: Gastropoda
- Subclass: Vetigastropoda
- Order: Trochida
- Family: Turbinidae
- Genus: Turbo
- Species: T. tuberculosus

Binomial name
- Turbo tuberculosus Quoy & Gaimard, 1834

Synonyms
- Turbo nivosa Reeve, 1848; Turbo (Marmarostoma) tuberculosus Quoy & Gaimard, 1834; Turbo (Taeniaturbo) necnivosus Iredale, T., 1929

= Turbo tuberculosus =

Species of gastropod

Turbo tuberculosus is a species of medium-sized sea snail, a marine gastropod mollusk in the family Turbinidae the turban snails.

Some authors place this species in the subgenus Turbo (Marmarostoma).

== Description ==
The length of the shell varies between 17 mm and 40 mm. The imperforate, ventricose shell has an subovate-turreted shape with an acute spire that is transversely sulcate. The five whorls are convex and are longitudinally slightly striated. The color pattern is white or yellow, radialately flammulated with red or brown. The apex has a green shine. The inside of the round aperture is brightly white. A few whorls are tuberculate or covered with rather rough prickles. The tubercles form three or four rows on the body whorl.

== Distribution ==
This marine species occurs off Australia (the Northern Territory & Western Australia); off New Caledonia, the Philippines, the Solomon Island and Tonga.
