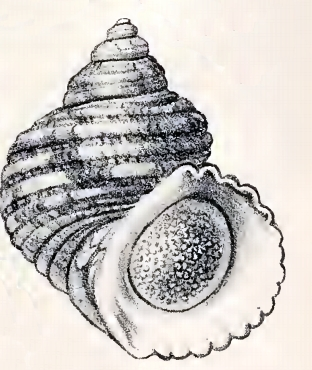
- Drawing with an apertural view of a shell of Turbo japonicus

Scientific classification
- Kingdom: Animalia
- Phylum: Mollusca
- Class: Gastropoda
- Subclass: Vetigastropoda
- Order: Trochida
- Superfamily: Trochoidea
- Family: Turbinidae
- Genus: Turbo
- Species: T. japonicus

Binomial name
- Turbo japonicus Reeve, 1848

Synonyms
- Turbo (Marmarostoma) japonicus Reeve, 1848; Turbo cernicus G. B. Sowerby III, 1896

= Turbo japonicus =

Species of gastropod

Turbo japonicus is a species of sea snail, a marine gastropod mollusk, in the family Turbinidae.

== Description ==
(Described as Turbo cernicus) The solid, subventricose, imperforate shell has an ovate conic shape. Its color pattern is yellowish, longitudinally flammulated. The acute spire is elevated. The convex whorls are sloping above, minutely obliquely striate, encircled by wide flattened ribs, alternating with smaller. The body whorl is obtusely angulated above, lightly depressed above the angle, and scarcely canaliculate. The aperture is circular. The acute lip is scalloped. The thick columella is convex, slightly arcuate and slightly produced at base, and longitudinally plicated.

The operculum is very convex outside. It is green, suffused with bright reddish brown, and conspicuously granulose.

== Distribution ==
This species occurs in the Indian Ocean off Mauritius and Réunion; also in the Central Pacific.
