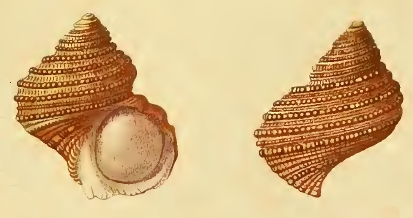
- Drawing with two views of a shell of Turbo gemmatus

Scientific classification
- Kingdom: Animalia
- Phylum: Mollusca
- Class: Gastropoda
- Subclass: Vetigastropoda
- Order: Trochida
- Family: Turbinidae
- Genus: Turbo
- Species: T. gemmatus

Binomial name
- Turbo gemmatus Reeve, 1848

Synonyms
- Turbo (Carswellena) gemmatus Reeve, 1848; Turbo (Marmarostoma) gemmatus Reeve, 1848; Turbo (Senectus) gemmatus (Reeve, 1848)

= Turbo gemmatus =

Species of gastropod

Turbo gemmatus is a species of sea snail, a marine gastropod mollusk in the family Turbinidae, the turban snails.

== Notes ==
Additional information regarding this species:

- Taxonomic status: Some authors place the name in the subgenus Turbo (Marmarostoma)

== Description ==
(Original description by Reeve) The shell grows to a length of 15 mm. The imperforate shell has a somewhat depressed ovate shape. The sutures of the spire are somewhat deeply channelled. The whorls are beaded throughout with small nodules. Its color pattern is light coral red. The interior is silvered.

(Description by M.M. Schepman) The specimens vary much in colour and markings, some specimens are nearly typical, varying from light orange-red to dark coral-red, and a few are olive-green; nearly all the specimens are marked with white spots or flames, often mixed with dark or black granules. Many of them have a row of granules next the suture, forming a necklace of white and black. There is a tendency to have four such zones on the body whorl, the second at the shoulder, the third lower, the fourth near the base, occupying as a rule the first, fourth, seventh and eleventh or twelfth row of granules. But as there is some variation in the sculpture, there may be some rows more or less, in most cases, very small intermediate granules can be seen. The columella is surrounded by a thicker rib at its base, which may be indicated as crenate, this rib is yellowish-white, with darker yellow in the interstices. This lighter colour extends in a few specimens over the base of the shell. In some specimens, more rows of granules are variegated with dark and white, giving to the shell a very beautiful mottled appearance. The granules are mainly strongly developed, but in two specimens they are somewhat obliterated. The operculum is slightly oval, one specimen being 10 mm in its largest diameter and 9 mm in breadth. The inner surface is covered by a light brown cuticle, darker towards the outer margin and towards the margin of the outer whorls, the number of which seems to be four; the outer one is very broad. The nucleus is subcentral, but approaches the basal and columellar margins. The external surface is porcelain-white, very thick near the left upper part, less so on the right side. It is covered with not very conspicuous, somewhat vermiform rugosities, and has a marked depression on the lower half, slightly to the left, nearly opposite to the nucleus on the internal side. The right margin is smooth and shining.

== Distribution ==
The marine species occurs in the Central Indo-Pacific, the West Pacific and off Australia (Queensland)
