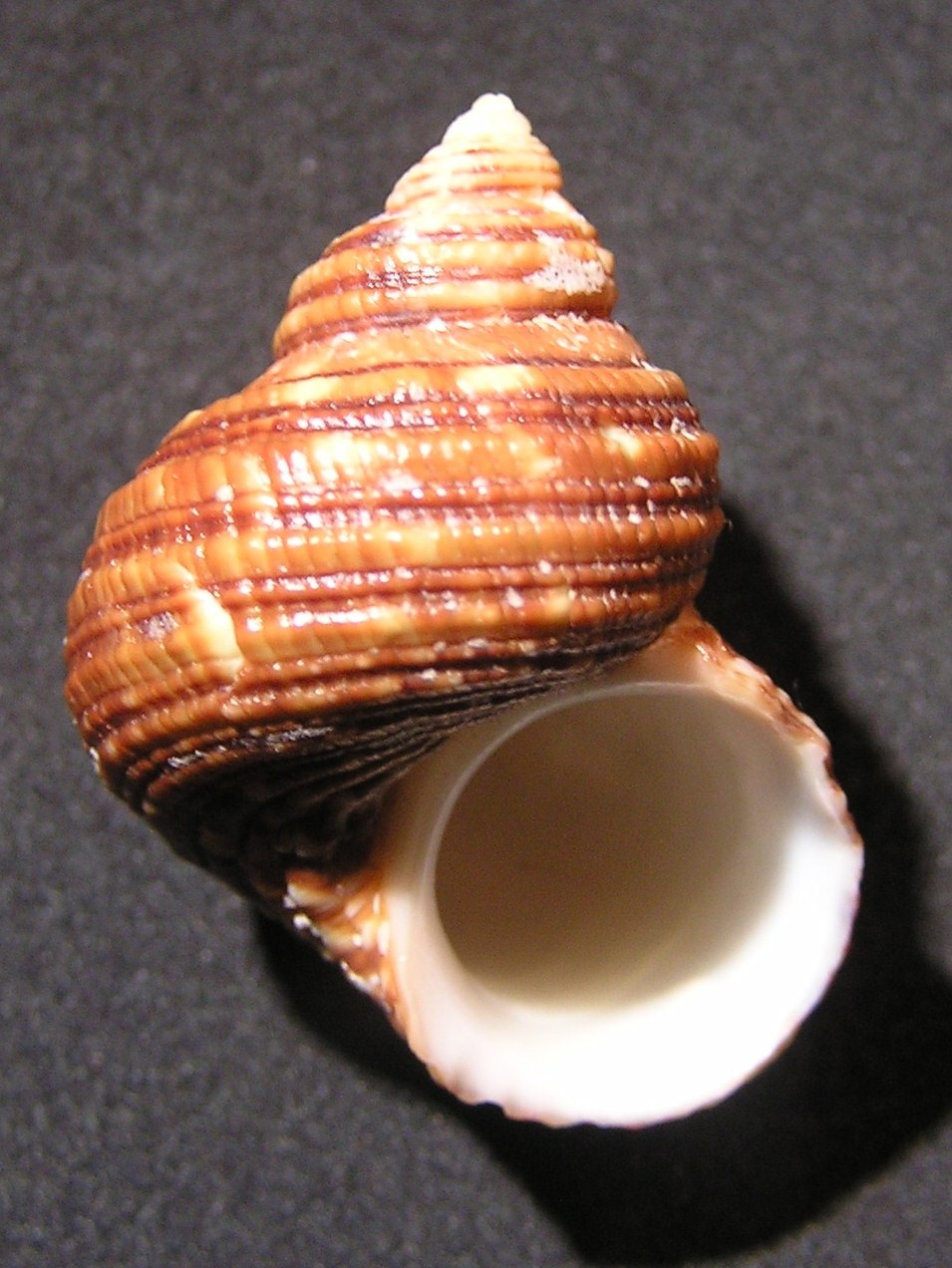
- Apertural view of a shell of Turbo smithi

Scientific classification
- Kingdom: Animalia
- Phylum: Mollusca
- Class: Gastropoda
- Subclass: Vetigastropoda
- Order: Trochida
- Family: Turbinidae
- Genus: Turbo
- Species: T. smithi

Binomial name
- Turbo smithi G.B. Sowerby III, 1886

Synonyms
- Turbo aurantius Kiener, 1847; Turbo fortispiralis Kreipl & Alf, 2003; Turbo necnivosus Iredale, 1929; Turbo parvulus Philippi, 1849

= Turbo smithi =

Species of gastropod

Turbo smithi, common name the miniature turban, is a species of sea snail, a marine gastropod mollusk in the family Turbinidae, the turban snails.

== Description ==
The size of the shell attains 24 mm. The imperforate shell has an ovate-conic shape. Its color pattern is yellowish brown, or yellow clouded with orange-brown. The elevated spire is acute. The five whorls are sloping above, convex, longitudinally irregularly striate, and spirally costate. The costae are rugose, irregular, slightly elevated, about four on the penultimate whorl, twelve on the body whorl. The aperture is circular. The peristome is simple. The columella is white.

== Distribution ==
This marine species occurs off the Philippines.
