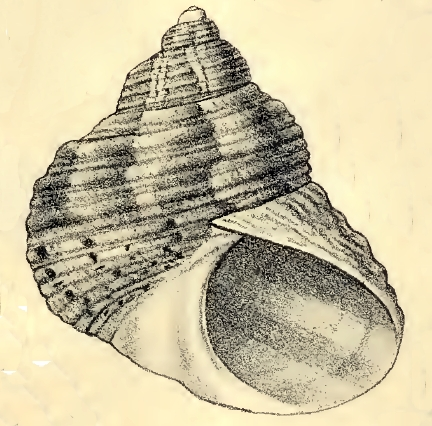
- Drawing of a shell of Turbo laetus

Scientific classification
- Kingdom: Animalia
- Phylum: Mollusca
- Class: Gastropoda
- Subclass: Vetigastropoda
- Order: Trochida
- Family: Turbinidae
- Genus: Turbo
- Species: T. laetus

Binomial name
- Turbo laetus Philippi, 1849

Synonyms
- Turbo (Carswellena) laetus Philippi, 1849; Turbo (Euninella) laetus Philippi, 1849; Turbo splendidulus G.B. Sowerby III, 1886; Turbo (Turbo) splendidulus Sowerby, G.B. III, 1886

= Turbo laetus =

Species of gastropod

Turbo laetus is a species of sea snail, marine gastropod mollusk in the family Turbinidae.

- Taxonomic status: Some authors place the name in the subgenus Turbo (Euninella)

== Description ==
The length of the shell varies between 50 mm and 75 mm. The conoid, imperforate shell is spirally lirate. It is smooth, pale flesh colored, and painted with large radiating ferrugineous maculations. The lirae number about nine on the body whorl, alternately smaller, the third much elevated forming an angle. The lirae of the base of the shell are slightly elevated, white and black maculated. The columella is surrounded by an orange colored area. The aperture is subcircular and silvery within.

== Distribution ==
This marine species occurs from Southeast Africa, to Tanzania and the Gulf of Oman.
