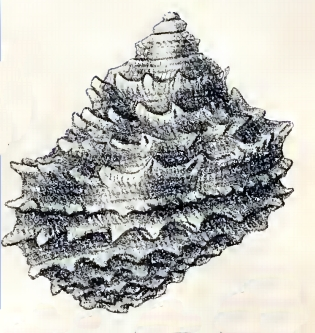
- Drawing of a shell of Turbo histrio

Scientific classification
- Kingdom: Animalia
- Phylum: Mollusca
- Class: Gastropoda
- Subclass: Vetigastropoda
- Order: Trochida
- Family: Turbinidae
- Genus: Turbo
- Species: T. histrio

Binomial name
- Turbo histrio Reeve, 1848

Synonyms
- Turbo histrio f. bicolor Sowerby III, 1886; Turbo (Marmarostoma) histrio Reeve, 1848

= Turbo histrio =

Species of gastropod

Turbo histrio is a species of sea snail, a marine gastropod mollusk in the family Turbinidae, the turban snails.

== Description ==
The height of the shell attains 45 mm, its diameter 40 mm. The shell is somewhat globose, swollen, and imperforated. The sutures of the spire are excavately channelled and spirally ridged. These ridges are very finely laminiferous and squamate. The scales are strong and erect. The color of the shell is snowy-white, broadly rayed with orange-rust color. The interior is silvered.

== Distribution ==
This marine species was found in the Indian Ocean off the Amirante Islands

== Notes ==
Additional information regarding this species:

- Taxonomic status: Some authors place the name in the subgenus Turbo (Marmarostoma).
