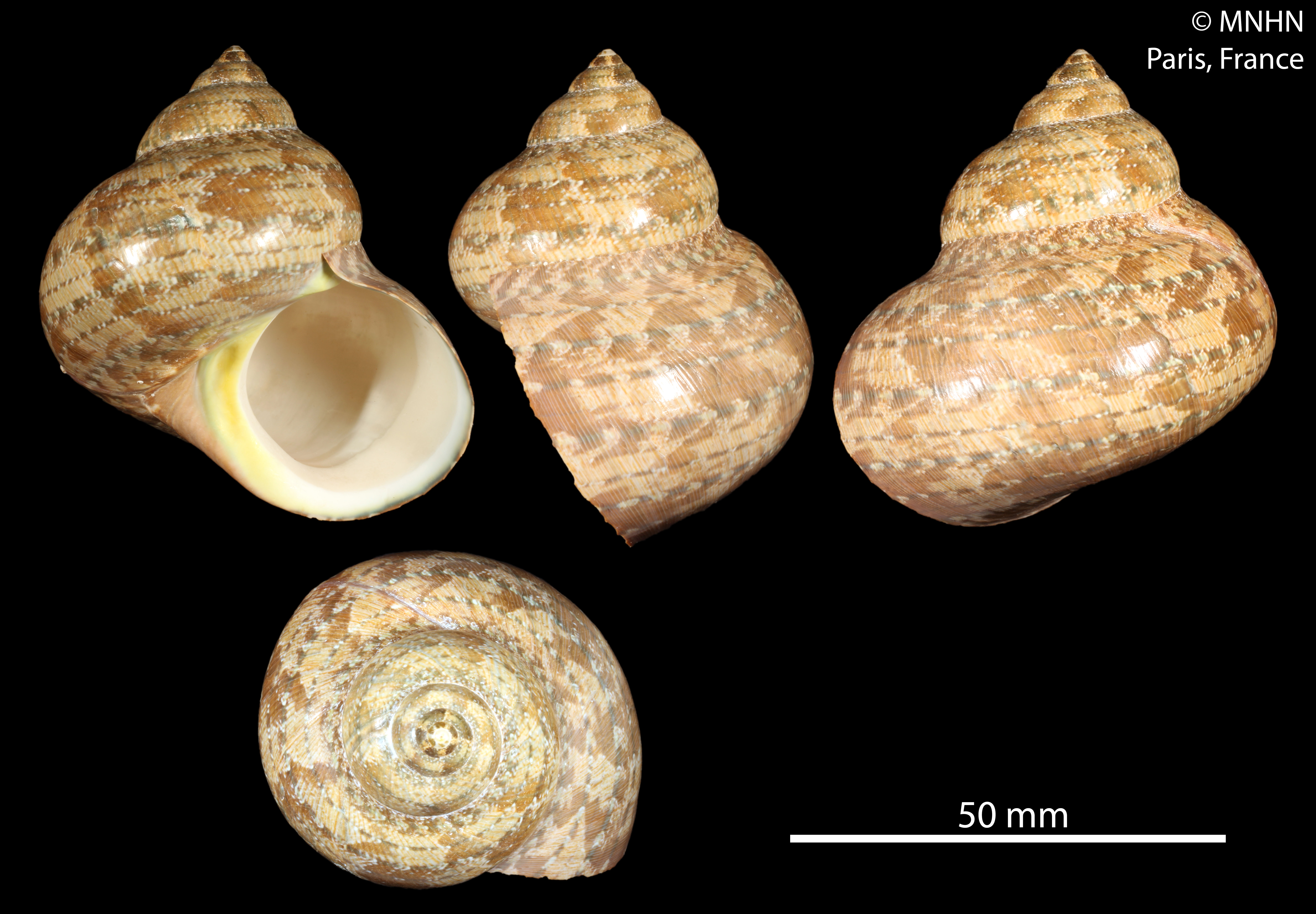
- Shell of Turbo walteri (paratype at MNHN, Paris)

Scientific classification
- Kingdom: Animalia
- Phylum: Mollusca
- Class: Gastropoda
- Subclass: Vetigastropoda
- Order: Trochida
- Superfamily: Trochoidea
- Family: Turbinidae
- Genus: Turbo
- Species: T. walteri

Binomial name
- Turbo walteri Kreipl & Dekker, 2009

Synonyms
- Turbo (Turbo) walteri Kreipl & Dekker, 2009

= Turbo walteri =

Species of gastropod

Turbo walteri is a species of sea snail, a marine gastropod mollusk in the family Turbinidae, the turban snails.

== Description ==
The length of the shell varies between 35 mm and 55 mm.

== Distribution ==
This marine species occurs off Northwest Australia.
