= Turbo jonathani =

Scientific classification
- Kingdom: Animalia
- Phylum: Mollusca
- Class: Gastropoda
- Subclass: Vetigastropoda
- Order: Trochida
- Family: Turbinidae
- Genus: Turbo
- Species: T. jonathani

Binomial name
- Turbo jonathani Dekker, Moolenbeek & Dance, 1992

Synonyms
- Turbo (Aspilaturbo) jonathani Dekker, Moolenbeek & Dance, 1992; Turbo (Turbo) jonathani Dekker, Moolenbeek & Dance, 1992

Species of gastropod

Turbo jonathani is a species of sea snail, a marine gastropod mollusk in the family Turbinidae, the turban snails.

- Taxonomic status: Some authors place the name in the subgenus Turbo (Marmarostoma).

== Description ==
The length of the shell varies between 50 mm and 65 mm.

== Distribution ==
This marine species occurs off Tanzania and Oman.
