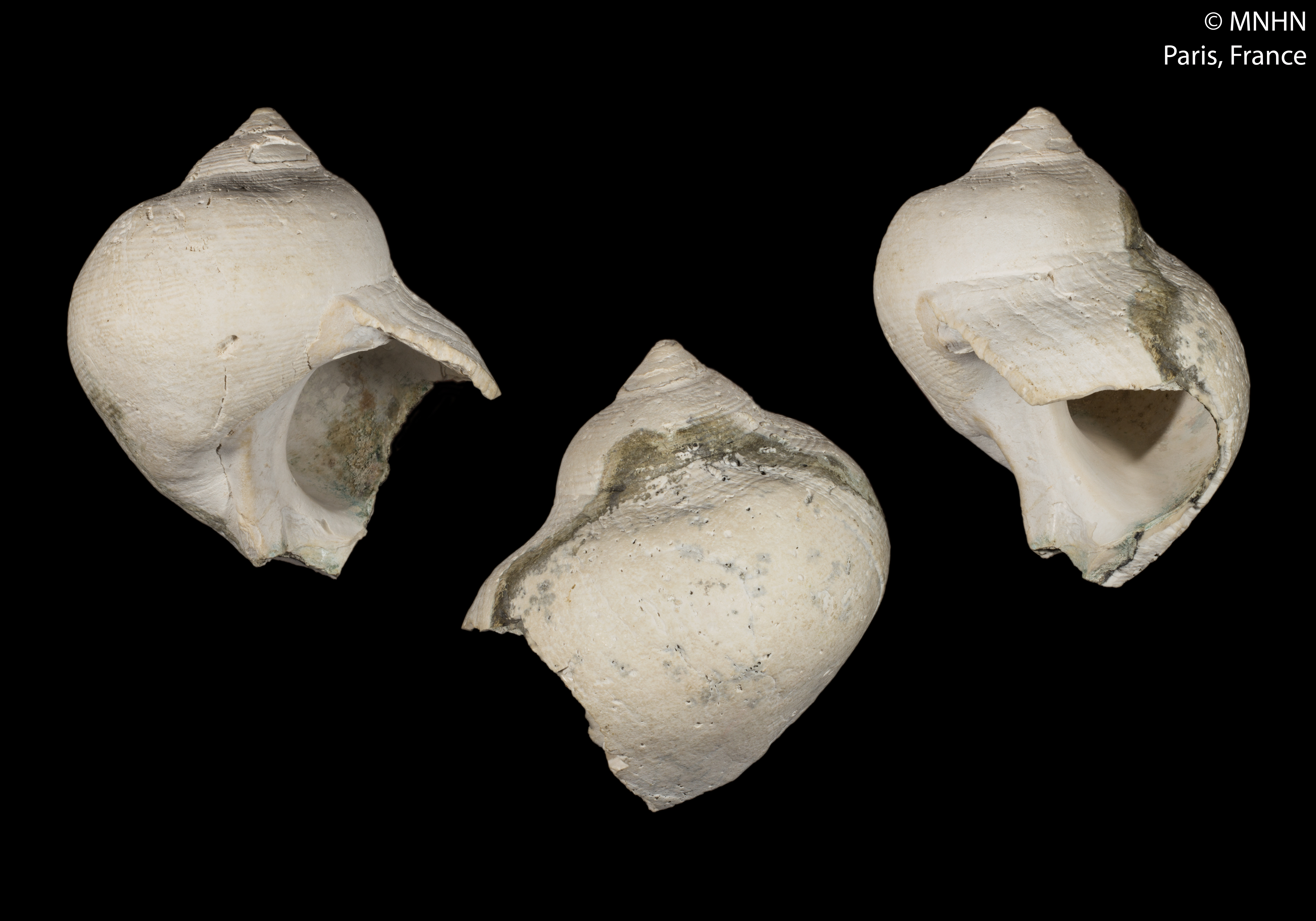
- Shell of Turbo fakaauensis (holotype at MNHN, Paris)

Scientific classification
- Kingdom: Animalia
- Phylum: Mollusca
- Class: Gastropoda
- Subclass: Vetigastropoda
- Order: Trochida
- Superfamily: Trochoidea
- Family: Turbinidae
- Genus: Turbo
- Species: †T. fakaauensis

Binomial name
- †Turbo fakaauensis Tröndlé & Letourneux, 2012

= Turbo fakaauensis =

Extinct species of gastropod

Turbo fakaauensis is an extinct species of sea snail, a marine gastropod mollusk, in the family Turbinidae, the turban snails.
