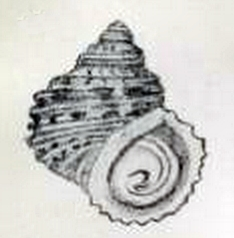
- Original drawing of a shell of Turbo excellens

Scientific classification
- Kingdom: Animalia
- Phylum: Mollusca
- Class: Gastropoda
- Subclass: Vetigastropoda
- Order: Trochida
- Family: Turbinidae
- Genus: Turbo
- Species: T. excellens

Binomial name
- Turbo excellens G.B. Sowerby III, 1914

Synonyms
- Turbo (Callopoma) excellens G.B. Sowerby III, 1914 (original description); Turbo (Carswellena) excellens G. B. Sowerby III, 1914

= Turbo excellens =

Species of gastropod

Turbo excellens is a species of sea snail, a marine gastropod mollusk in the family Turbinidae, the turban snails.

== Distribution ==
This marine species occurs off Japan.

== Description ==
The length of the shell varies between 10 mm and 22 mm. The imperforate shell has a globose-turbinate shape. Its color pattern is pale fleshy, vividly painted with reddish brown. The conic spire contains five convex whorls with narrowly channelled sutures. The whorls are spirally lirated with minute nodules. The penultimate whorl is trilirate. The body whorl is inflated, globose and almost square-shaped. The aperture is subcircular and silvery white on the inside. The peristome is simple. The white columella is thick and smooth. The operculum is almost round. Its outer surface is white, very convex and everywhere minutely granulate.

== Notes ==
Additional information regarding this species:

- Taxonomic status: Some authors place the name in the subgenus Turbo (Callopoma)
