= Turbo oryctus =

Scientific classification
- Kingdom: Animalia
- Phylum: Mollusca
- Class: Gastropoda
- Subclass: Vetigastropoda
- Order: Trochida
- Superfamily: Trochoidea
- Family: Turbinidae
- Genus: Turbo
- Species: †T. oryctus

Binomial name
- †Turbo oryctus (Suter, 1917)

Synonyms
- Calliostoma oryctum Suter, 1917

Extinct species of gastropod

Turbo oryctus is an extinct species of sea snail, a marine gastropod mollusk, in the family Turbinidae, the turban snails.

== Distribution ==
This species occurred in New Zealand.
