= Turbo angelvaldesi =

Scientific classification
- Kingdom: Animalia
- Phylum: Mollusca
- Class: Gastropoda
- Subclass: Vetigastropoda
- Order: Trochida
- Family: Turbinidae
- Genus: Turbo
- Species: T. angelvaldesi

Binomial name
- Turbo angelvaldesi Ortea & Espinosa, 1996

Synonyms
- Turbo (Senectus) angelvaldesi Ortea & Espinosa, 1996

Species of gastropod

Turbo angelvaldesi is a species of sea snail, a marine gastropod mollusk in the family Turbinidae, the turban snails.

== Distribution ==
This species occurs in the Gulf of Mexico off Yucatan.

== Description ==
The maximum recorded shell length is 45.6 mm.

== Habitat ==
The minimum recorded depth is 43 m, and the maximum recorded depth is 43 m.
