= Turbo kenwilliamsi =

Scientific classification
- Kingdom: Animalia
- Phylum: Mollusca
- Class: Gastropoda
- Subclass: Vetigastropoda
- Order: Trochida
- Family: Turbinidae
- Genus: Turbo
- Species: T. kenwilliamsi

Binomial name
- Turbo kenwilliamsi Williams, 2008

Synonyms
- Turbo pulcher Reeve, 1842 (Invalid: junior homonym of Turbo pulcher Dillwyn, 1817; T. kenwilliamsi is a replacement name); Turbo (Marmarostoma) pulcher Reeve, L.A., 1842

Species of gastropod

Turbo kenwilliamsi, common name the beautiful turban, is a species of sea snail, a marine gastropod mollusk in the family Turbinidae, the turban snails.

== Description ==
The length of the shell varies between 40 mm and 80 mm.

The shell is characterized by black spots spiraling around the shell. The shell is swollen with cream ridges. It is found at a depth of 0-12 meters.

== Distribution ==
This marine species occurs off Western Australia to North Australia.
