= Turbo haynesi =

Scientific classification
- Kingdom: Animalia
- Phylum: Mollusca
- Class: Gastropoda
- Subclass: Vetigastropoda
- Order: Trochida
- Family: Turbinidae
- Genus: Turbo
- Species: T. haynesi

Binomial name
- Turbo haynesi Preston, 1914

Synonyms
- Senectus necnivosus Iredale, 1929 (replacement name of Turbo nivosus Montagu, 1803); Turbo foliaceus haynesi Preston, 1914; Turbo menkei Thiele, 1930; Turbo nivosus Reeve, 1848 (preoccupied name of Turbo nivosus Montagu, 1803); Turbo (Carswellena) haynesi (Preston, 1914); Turbo (Marmarostoma) haynesi (Preston, 1914); Turbo (Marmarostoma) menkei Thiele, 1930

Species of gastropod

Turbo haynesi, common name Hayne's turban, is a species of sea snail, marine gastropod mollusk in the family Turbinidae. This species is endemic to the Western Atlantic, particularly found in shallow reef environments from Florida to Brazil. Like many turbinids, Turbo haynesi plays an ecological role as a grazer, helping control algal growth on coral reefs.

== Description ==
The shell grows to a length of 27 mm.

== Distribution ==
This marine species occurs off Western Australia to Queensland, Australia and off New Caledonia.
