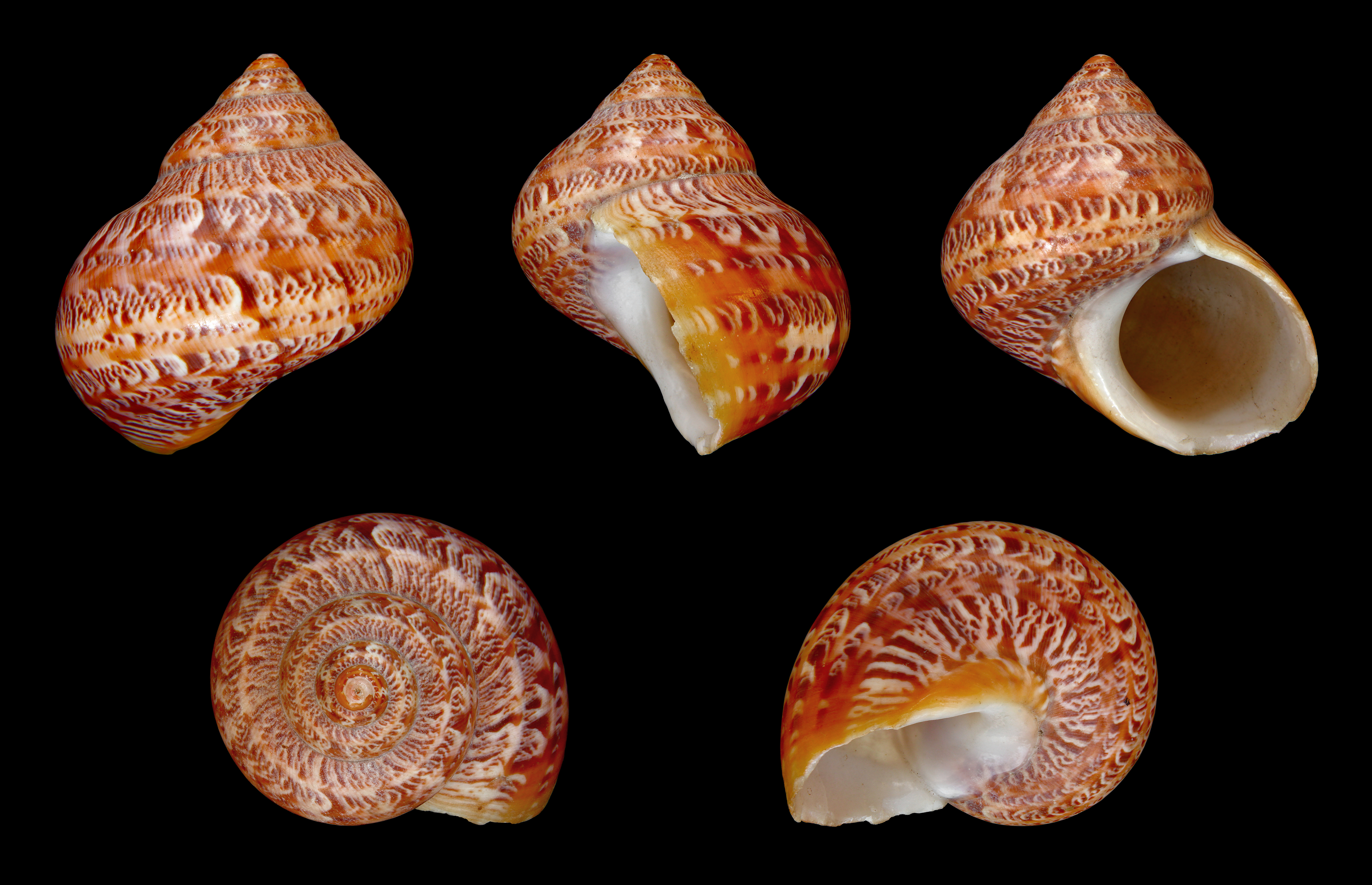
- Several views of a shell of Turbo reevii

Scientific classification
- Kingdom: Animalia
- Phylum: Mollusca
- Class: Gastropoda
- Subclass: Vetigastropoda
- Order: Trochida
- Superfamily: Trochoidea
- Family: Turbinidae
- Genus: Turbo
- Species: T. reevii

Binomial name
- Turbo reevii Philippi, 1847

Synonyms
- Turbo (Turbo) reevei Philippi, 1847; Turbo (Turbo) reevii Philippi, 1847; Turbo reevei Philippi, 1847; Turbo variabilis Reeve, 1842

= Turbo reevii =

Species of sea snail

Turbo reevii, Reeve's turban, is a species of sea snail, a marine gastropod mollusk, in the family Turbinidae.

== Description ==
The length of the shell varies between 32 mm and 100 mm. The color pattern of the shell is deep or reddish brown, clouded and minutely flecked with white. The peristome is white. The columella contains a heavy callus. It differs from Turbo petholatus in the more obscure, marbled color pattern.

== Distribution ==
This marine species occurs in the Indian Ocean off the Mascarene Basin; off the Philippines, Indonesia, Japan and Vietnam; in the South China Sea.
