= Turbo albofasciatus =

Scientific classification
- Kingdom: Animalia
- Phylum: Mollusca
- Class: Gastropoda
- Subclass: Vetigastropoda
- Order: Trochida
- Family: Turbinidae
- Genus: Turbo
- Species: T. albofasciatus

Binomial name
- Turbo albofasciatus Bozzetti, 1994

Synonyms
- Turbo (Marmarostoma) albofasciatus Bozzetti, 1994

Species of gastropod

Turbo albofasciatus is a species of sea snail, a marine gastropod mollusk in the family Turbinidae, the turban snails.

Some authors place this genus in the subgenus Turbo (Marmarostoma).

== Description ==
The size of the shell attains 18 mm.

== Distribution ==
This species occurs in the Indian Ocean off Somalia.
