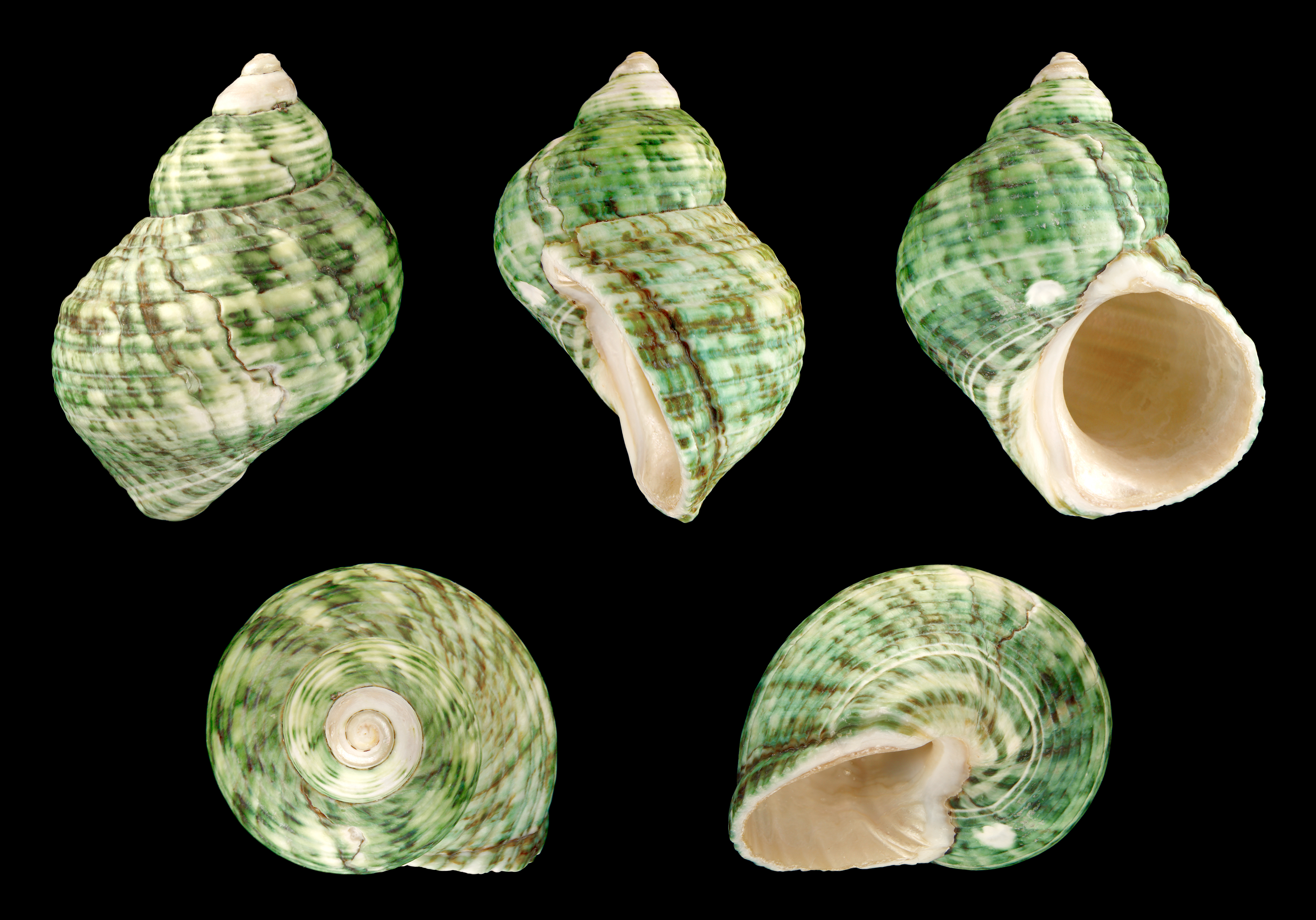
- Drawing with an apertural view of a shell of Turbo crassus

Scientific classification
- Kingdom: Animalia
- Phylum: Mollusca
- Class: Gastropoda
- Subclass: Vetigastropoda
- Order: Trochida
- Family: Turbinidae
- Genus: Turbo
- Species: T. crassus

Binomial name
- Turbo crassus W. Wood, 1828

Synonyms
- Turbo (Marmarostoma) crassus W. Wood, 1828

= Turbo crassus =

Species of gastropod

Turbo crassus, common name the crass turban, is a species of sea snail, a marine gastropod mollusk in the family Turbinidae, the turban snails.

== Description ==
The size of the shell varies between 50 mm and 80 mm. The large, heavy, solid, imperforate shell has an ovate-conic shape. Its color pattern is dirty white, or greenish, maculated with angular, alternating blackish or brown and light patches on the broad flat spiral ribs. The interstices are narrow, superficial, and whitish. The six whorls are, convex, more or less prominently shouldered above. The ribs are obsolete around the axis. The aperture is white within and measures over half the length of shell. It is ovate, angled posteriorly and at position of the carina. Its margin is more or less green tinged, not fluted. The columella is thickened and effuse at its base, callous posteriorly.

The operculum is subcircular, concave internally, with a nucleus one-third the distance across face. Its outer surface is very convex, the center dark-brown, coarsely granulose, lighter toward the outer margin and more minutely granulate. The margin of increment is white.

== Distribution ==
This marine species occurs in the Western Pacific and Polynesia; off Australia (Queensland).

== Notes ==
Additional information regarding this species:

- Taxonomic status: Some authors place the name in the subgenus Turbo (Marmarostoma)
