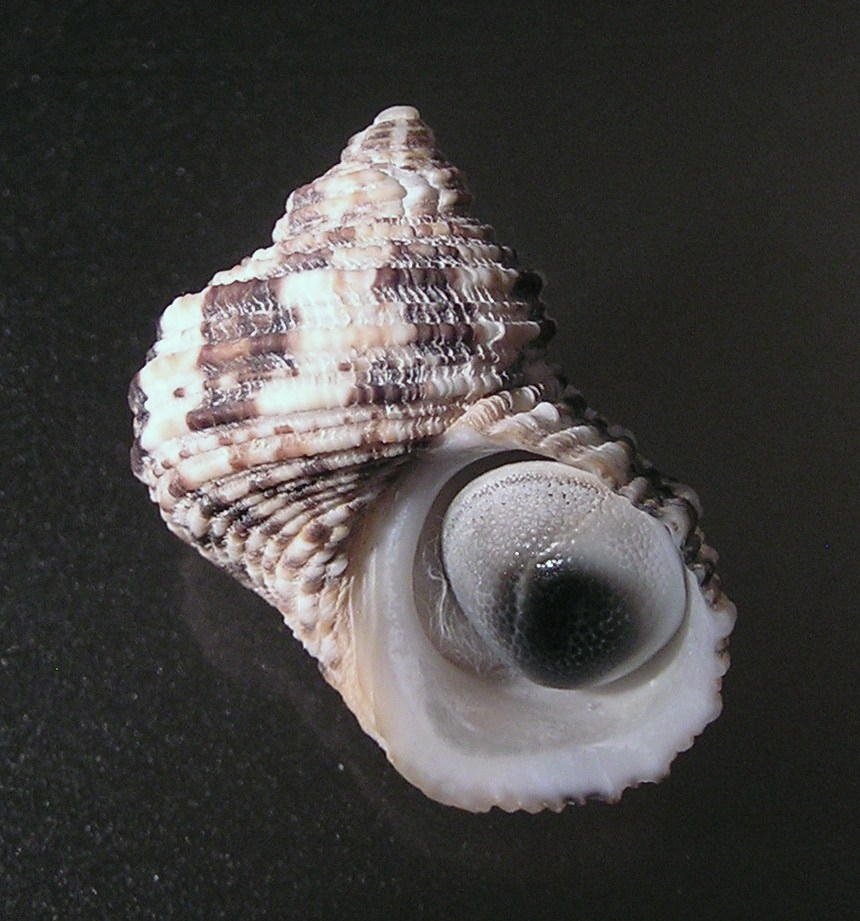

Scientific classification
- Kingdom: Animalia
- Phylum: Mollusca
- Class: Gastropoda
- Subclass: Vetigastropoda
- Order: Trochida
- Family: Turbinidae
- Genus: Turbo
- Species: T. ticaonicus

Binomial name
- Turbo ticaonicus Reeve, 1848

Synonyms
- Turbo (Marmarostoma) ticaonicus Reeve, 1848

= Turbo ticaonicus =

Species of gastropod

Turbo ticaonicus is a species of sea snail, a marine gastropod mollusk in the family Turbinidae, the turban snails.

== Description ==
The shell attains a height between 50 mm and 60 mm. The perforate, solid shell has an ovate-conic shape. Its color pattern is dirty white or greenish, radiately flammulated above and maculate below with black or brown. The six whorls are convex, slightly flattened below the subcanaliculate sutures, sometimes subcarinate. They are spirally sculptured with inequal lirae, the intervening furrows sharply squamose with striae of increment. The round aperture is produced into a projecting angle posteriorly and frequently disconnected from the body whorl. It is white and pearly within, rounded or slightly produced below. The outer lip is crenulate. The columella is arched and is excavated at the narrow umbilicus, which is sometimes subimperforate.

The operculum is very convex, dark green with a whitish margin, granulous on the right side. These granules become less distinct in the center, and obsolete, leaving a smooth polished surface, on the left.

== Distribution ==
This marine species occurs off Australia, New Caledonia and the Philippines; off the Seychelles and Madagascar.
