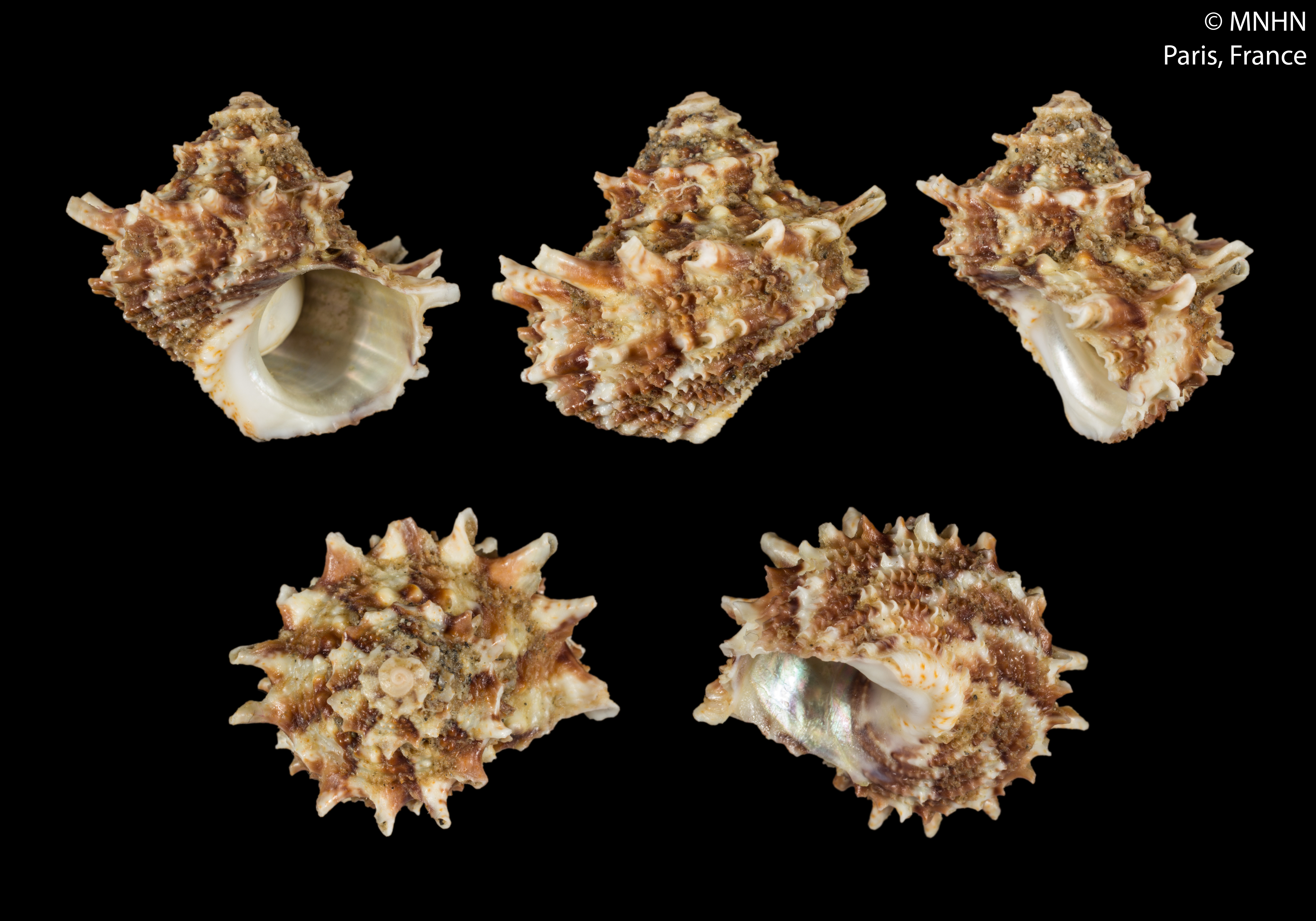
- Shell of Turbo bozzettiana (holotype at MNHN, Paris)

Scientific classification
- Kingdom: Animalia
- Phylum: Mollusca
- Class: Gastropoda
- Subclass: Vetigastropoda
- Order: Trochida
- Family: Turbinidae
- Genus: Turbo
- Species: T. bozzettiana

Binomial name
- Turbo bozzettiana Bozzetti, 2011

Synonyms
- Turbo (Marmarostoma) bozzettiana Bozzetti, 2011

= Turbo bozzettiana =

Species of gastropod

Turbo bozzettiana is a species of sea snail, a marine gastropod mollusk in the family Turbinidae, the turban snails.

== Description ==
The length of the shell varies between 15 mm and 18 mm.

== Distribution ==
This species occurs in the Indian Ocean off Southern Somalia.
