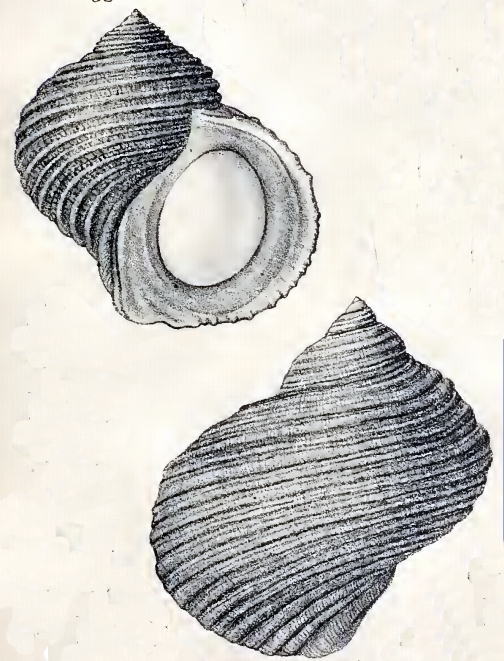
- Drawing with two views of a shell of Turbo artensis

Scientific classification
- Kingdom: Animalia
- Phylum: Mollusca
- Class: Gastropoda
- Subclass: Vetigastropoda
- Order: Trochida
- Family: Turbinidae
- Genus: Turbo
- Species: T. artensis

Binomial name
- Turbo artensis Montrouzier, 1860

Synonyms
- Turbo (Marmarostoma) artensis Montrouzier, 1860; Turbo (Senectus) artensis Montrouzier in Souverbie, 1860

= Turbo artensis =

Species of gastropod

Turbo artensis is a species of sea snail, a marine gastropod mollusk in the family Turbinidae, the turban snails.

== Description ==
The height of the shell attains 65 mm, its diameter 60 mm. The shell has an oval or subrhomboidal outline. It is ventricose, solid, imperforate, and covered with a strong olivaceous epidermis. The short spire is acute. The sutures are subcanaliculate. The 5-6 whorls are convex, with spiral lirae which are narrower than their interstices, and number 11–12 on the body whorl. The grooves are closely radiately lamellar striate, with a central riblet. The aperture is ovate, angulate above and below, white within. The flattened columella is wide, effuse at its base.

The castaneous operculum is slightly concave within. It contains three whorls. The nucleus is situated at one-third the distance across the face. Its outer surface is white, convex. Its center is obsoletely granulose, the outer part is obliquely striate.

== Distribution ==
This marine species occurs in the Indo-Pacific.
