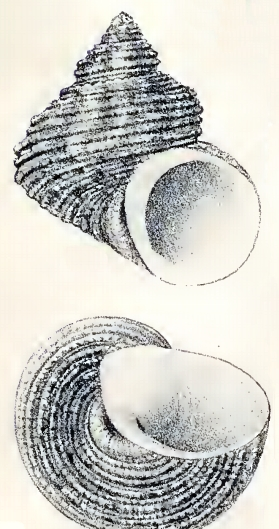
- Original drawing with two views of a shell of Turbo heterocheilus

Scientific classification
- Kingdom: Animalia
- Phylum: Mollusca
- Class: Gastropoda
- Subclass: Vetigastropoda
- Order: Trochida
- Family: Turbinidae
- Genus: Turbo
- Species: T. heterocheilus

Binomial name
- Turbo heterocheilus Pilsbry, 1888

Synonyms
- Turbo (Carswellena) heterocheilus Pilsbry, 1888; Turbo (Marmarostoma) heterocheilus Pilsbry, 1888

= Turbo heterocheilus =

Species of gastropod

Turbo heterocheilus is a species of sea snail, marine gastropod mollusk in the family Turbinidae.

Taxonomic status: Some authors place the name in the subgenus Turbo (Marmarostoma)

== Description ==
(Original description by G.W. Tryon) The length of the shell varies between 19 mm and 37 mm. The solid, subimperforate shell has a turbinate-conic shape. its color pattern is soiled white, above longitudinally flammulated with greenish and brown, the base irregularly maculated with the same colors. In color, too, the forms are diverse. The sculpture consistis of spiral lirae cut into regular close rounded beads. The interstices between the principal lirae are occupied by beaded lirulae, or, on the upper whorls by very close regular small folds, in the direction of incremental lines, the surfaces of which show traces of microscopic impressed spiral lines. The lirae number about 20 on the body whorl. Three or four lirae about the peripheral region are more prominent; those of the base are subequal, and less conspicuous. The sculpture also becomes obsolescent toward the termination of the body whorl. The conic spire is small and acute. The sutures are subcanaliculate, with a beaded border. The 5½-6 whorls are quite convex, and rapidly increasing. The body whorl is large, convex, and slightly descending anteriorly. The aperture is about half the total altitude of the shell, oblique, oval, rounded above and below, silvery within. The outer lip is acute, rather thin, regularly arcuate. The columellar callus continues upon the parietal wall, forming a regularly arcuate inner lip. The parietal callus is dilated upon the body whorl in front of the aperture. The columella is rounded, the lip slightly everted, partly covering the umbilical fissure, which is encircled by a spiral ridge terminating at the base of the columella.

== Distribution ==
This marine species occurs off Thailand and the Philippines.
