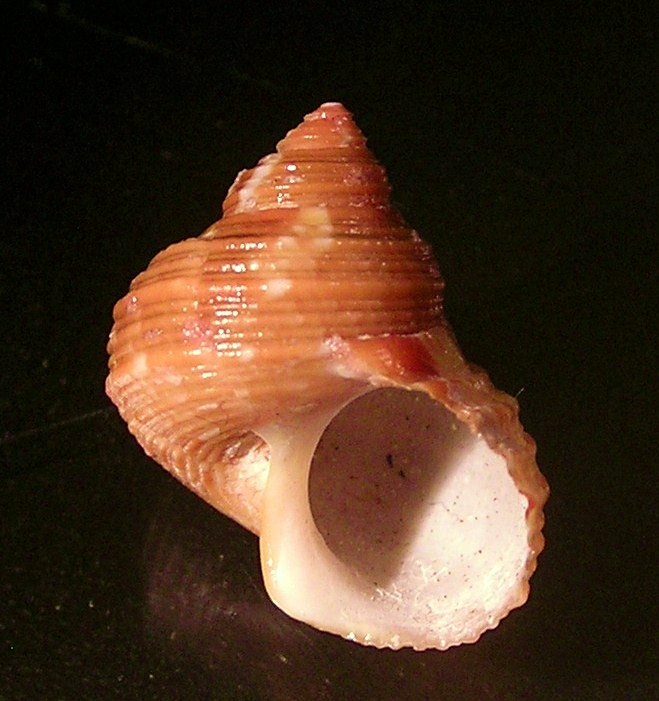
- Apertural view of a shell of Turbo cailletii

Scientific classification
- Kingdom: Animalia
- Phylum: Mollusca
- Class: Gastropoda
- Subclass: Vetigastropoda
- Order: Trochida
- Family: Turbinidae
- Genus: Turbo
- Species: T. cailletii

Binomial name
- Turbo cailletii P. Fischer & Bernardi, 1857

Synonyms
- Trochus filosus W. Wood, 1828; Turbo filosus W. Wood, 1828; Turbo (Marmarostoma) filosus Wood, W., 1828; Turbo (Taeniaturbo) cailletii Fischer, P. & A.C. Bernardi, 1856

= Turbo cailletii =

Species of gastropod

Turbo cailletii, common name the filose turban, is a species of sea snail, a marine gastropod mollusk in the family Turbinidae, the turban snails.

== Distribution ==
This species occurs in the Gulf of Mexico, the Caribbean Sea and the Lesser Antilles.

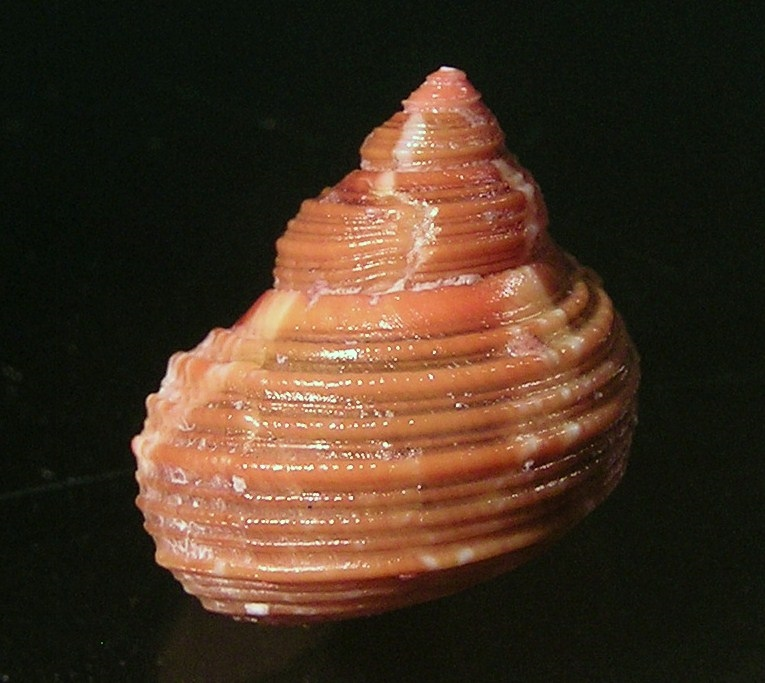
Abapertural view

== Description ==
The maximum recorded shell length is 37 mm.

The ovate-conic shell is perforate, solid, and shining. The sutures are impressed. The 5-6 whorls are convex, rounded, and spirally lirate. The body whorl exceeds the balance of the shell in length. It contains six prominent spiral lirae and is minutely lirate around the umbilicus. The ovate aperture is transversely dilated, and silvery within. The peristome is acute. The white columella is thickened. The color pattern of the shell is intense orange-red, the lirae are punctate with white. The white operculum is convex on its outside.

== Habitat ==
Minimum recorded depth is 4 m. Maximum recorded depth is 36 m.
