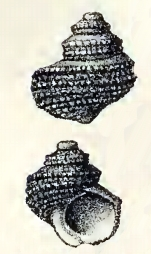
- Drawing of a shell of Turbo exquisitus

Scientific classification
- Kingdom: Animalia
- Phylum: Mollusca
- Class: Gastropoda
- Subclass: Vetigastropoda
- Order: Trochida
- Family: Turbinidae
- Genus: Turbo
- Species: T. exquisitus

Binomial name
- Turbo exquisitus Angas, 1877

Synonyms
- Turbo (Carswellena) exquisitus Angas, 1877

= Turbo exquisitus =

Species of gastropod

Turbo exquisitus, common name the exquisite turban, is a species of sea snail, marine gastropod mollusk in the family Turbinidae.

== Description ==
The length of the shell varies between 12 mm and 24 mm. The shell is small, imperforate, and solid. Its color pattern is pale greenish buff or light pink, painted with very broad descending flames of an orange color on the upper portion of the whorls. The 4 1/2 whorls are angulated on the periphery, and flattened above. The upper whorls are encircled below the angle with two ribs and the body whorl with five stout scabrously nodulous ribs. Between these and the sutures are four or five smaller and closer ribs of a similar character, and on the base of the body whorl about eight ribs which are less nodulous and scabrous than those above, the interstices being crossed by fine striae. The spire is somewhat elevated. The aperture is nearly circular and pearly within. The columella is thickened, terminating in a blunt callosity at the base.

A variety occurs of a brilliant orange-red color throughout.

== Distribution ==
This marine species occurs off Southern Queensland and New South Wales, Australia.
