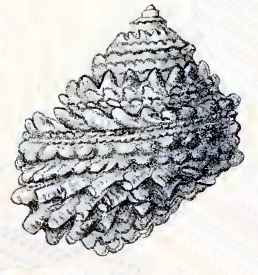
- Drawing of a shell of Turbo squamiger

Scientific classification
- Kingdom: Animalia
- Phylum: Mollusca
- Class: Gastropoda
- Subclass: Vetigastropoda
- Order: Trochida
- Family: Turbinidae
- Genus: Turbo
- Species: T. squamiger

Binomial name
- Turbo squamiger Reeve, 1843

Synonyms
- Turbo pustulata Reeve, 1843; Turbo pustulatus Reeve, 1848; Turbo subcastaneus Pilsbry, 1888; Turbo tuberculata Röding, 1798; Turbo (Marmarostoma) squamiger Reeve, 1843

= Turbo squamiger =

Species of gastropod

Turbo squamiger is a species of sea snail, marine gastropod mollusk in the family Turbinidae.

- Taxonomic status: Some authors place the name in the subgenus Turbo (Marmarostoma)

== Description ==
The length of the shell varies between 20 mm and 45 mm. The imperforate shell is globosely ovate, with the suture excavated. The 5–6 whorls are convex and carinate. The body whorl is ventricose, with erect tubercles at the suture. They are spirally armed throughout with scales, the upper and lower scales much larger. Its color pattern is pale green, dotted and variegated with reddish brown. The interior is silvery.

== Distribution ==
This species occurs in the Pacific Ocean from the Gulf of California, Western Mexico to Peru; and off Galapagos Islands.
