= Turbo mazatlanicus =

Scientific classification
- Kingdom: Animalia
- Phylum: Mollusca
- Class: Gastropoda
- Subclass: Vetigastropoda
- Order: Trochida
- Family: Turbinidae
- Genus: Turbo
- Species: T. mazatlanicus

Binomial name
- Turbo mazatlanicus Pilsbry & Lowe, 1932

Synonyms
- Turbo (Chaenoturbo) mazatlanicus Pilsbry & Lowe, 1932

Species of gastropod

Turbo mazatlanicus is a species of sea snail, marine gastropod mollusk in the family Turbinidae.

- Taxonomic status: Some authors place the name in the subgenus Turbo (Chaenoturbo).

== Description ==
The length of the shell varies between 5 mm and 15 mm.

== Distribution ==
This species occurs in the Pacific Ocean off Mazatlán, Mexico.
