= Turbo canaliculatus =

Scientific classification
- Kingdom: Animalia
- Phylum: Mollusca
- Class: Gastropoda
- Subclass: Vetigastropoda
- Order: Trochida
- Family: Turbinidae
- Genus: Turbo
- Species: T. canaliculatus

Binomial name
- Turbo canaliculatus Hermann, 1781

Synonyms
- Turbo cailletii auct. non Fischer & Bernardi, 1875; Turbo canaliculatus f. spengleriana Gmelin, 1791; Turbo spengleri Schumacher, 1817; Turbo spenglerianus Gmelin, 1791; Turbo (Taeniaturbo) canaliculatus Hermann, J., 1781

Species of gastropod

Turbo canaliculatus, common name the channeled turban, is a species of large sea snail, a marine gastropod mollusk in the family Turbinidae, the turban snails.

== Distribution ==
The distribution of Turbo canaliculatus includes the Caribbean Sea, Cuba, the Gulf of Mexico, Jamaica, the Lesser Antilles, Mexico and Puerto Rico.; in the Atlantic Ocean off Brazil.

== Description ==
The maximum recorded shell length is 98 mm.

The sutures show a deep, smooth channel. The body whorl contains 16-18 strong, spiral cords. The glossy shell has a narrow umbilicus and a white aperture. The operculum is pale brown on the inside and white and convex on the outside.

== Habitat ==
The minimum recorded depth is two m. The maximum recorded depth is 300 m.

== See also ==
- Turbo canaliculatus Gmelin, 1791 (note that this name has a different authority) is a synonym of Turbo argyrostomus argyrostomus Linnaeus, 1758.
