= Turbo debesi =

Scientific classification
- Kingdom: Animalia
- Phylum: Mollusca
- Class: Gastropoda
- Subclass: Vetigastropoda
- Order: Trochida
- Family: Turbinidae
- Genus: Turbo
- Species: T. debesi

Binomial name
- Turbo debesi Kreipl & Alf, 2000

Synonyms
- Turbo (Carswellena) debesi Kreipl & Alf, 2000; Turbo (Turbo) debesi Kreipl & Alf, 2000

Species of gastropod

Turbo debesi is a species of sea snail, a marine gastropod mollusk in the family Turbinidae, the turban snails.

== Description ==
The shell grows to a length of 23 mm.

== Distribution ==
This marine species is endemic to Australia and occurs off Western Australia.
