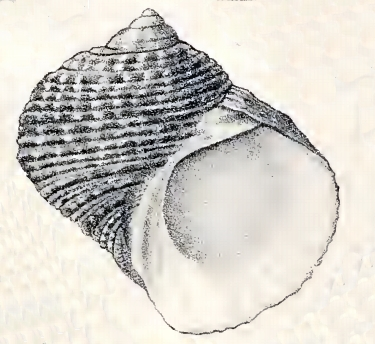
- Drawing of a shell of Turbo funiculosus

Scientific classification
- Kingdom: Animalia
- Phylum: Mollusca
- Class: Gastropoda
- Subclass: Vetigastropoda
- Order: Trochida
- Family: Turbinidae
- Genus: Turbo
- Species: T. funiculosus

Binomial name
- Turbo funiculosus Kiener, 1848

Synonyms
- Turbo (Callopoma) funiculosus Kiener, 1848; Turbo depressum Carpenter, 1856

= Turbo funiculosus =

Species of gastropod

Turbo funiculosus is a species of sea snail, a marine gastropod mollusk in the family Turbinidae, the turban snails.

== Notes ==
Additional information regarding this species:

- Taxonomic status: Some authors place the name in the subgenus Turbo (Callopoma)

== Description ==
The shell grows to a length of 60 mm. The solid, imperforate shell has an ovate-ventricose shape with a short, acute spire. The five whorls are convex and spirally lirate. The sutures are canaliculate. The large body whorl contains an unequal line and one or two intermediate lirulae in the interstices. The ovate aperture is silvery within. The peristome is greenish, somewhat fluted. The columella is dilated and produced at the base. The color pattern of the shell is chestnut-olive, maculated and tessellated with white.

== Distribution ==
This species occurs in the Pacific Ocean from Baja California peninsula to Peru.
