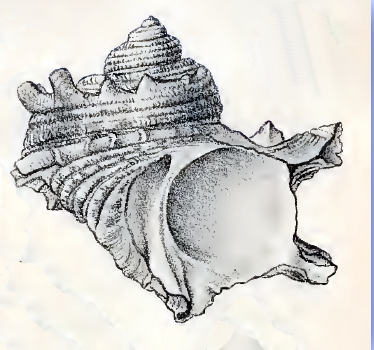
- Drawing of a shell of Turbo lajonkairii

Scientific classification
- Kingdom: Animalia
- Phylum: Mollusca
- Class: Gastropoda
- Subclass: Vetigastropoda
- Order: Trochida
- Family: Turbinidae
- Genus: Turbo
- Species: T. lajonkairii

Binomial name
- Turbo lajonkairii (Deshayes, 1839)

Synonyms
- Turbo argyrostomus lajonkairii (Deshayes, 1839); Turbo (Marmarostoma) argyrostomus lajonkairii (Deshayes, 1839)

= Turbo lajonkairii =

Species of gastropod

Turbo lajonkairii, common name the Lajonkairi's turban, is a species of sea snail, a marine gastropod mollusk in the family Turbinidae, the turban snails.

== Description ==
The length of the shell varies between 50 mm and 100 mm. The large, solid, umbilicate shell has a turbinate shape. Its color pattern is white, sometimes sparsely maculate with chestnut. The six whorls are striate, spirally lirate, and bicarinate. The body whorl is one and one-half armed with erect long stout tubular spines on the carinae, ten to twelve in number on the last whorl, usually tinged with green. The ovate aperture ovate, pearly white and iridescent within. The columella is thickened below, deflexed, produced and somewhat channelled, excavated at the conspicuous umbilicus.

The operculum is subcircular. Inside it is dark brown, with four whorls and a subcentral nucleus. Its outer surface is convex, coarsely granose, and dark brown in the center, lighter and minutely granulate toward the edges. The margin is substriate, with an orange line.

== Distribution ==
This species occurs in the Eastern Indian Ocean (Cocos (Keeling) Islands) and in the Western Pacific
