= Turbo scitulus =

Scientific classification
- Kingdom: Animalia
- Phylum: Mollusca
- Class: Gastropoda
- Subclass: Vetigastropoda
- Order: Trochida
- Family: Turbinidae
- Genus: Turbo
- Species: T. scitulus

Binomial name
- Turbo scitulus (Dall, 1919)

Synonyms
- Turbo agonistes Dall & Ochsner, 1928; Turbo (Marmarostoma) scitulus (Dall, W.H., 1919)

Species of gastropod

Turbo scitulus, common name the Galapagos turban, is a species of sea snail, a marine gastropod mollusk in the family Turbinidae, the turban snails.

== Notes ==
Additional information regarding this species:

- Taxonomic status: Some authors place the name in the subgenus Turbo (Marmarostoma)

== Description ==
The length of the purple shell varies between 25 mm and 31 mm.

== Distribution ==
This species occurs in the Pacific Ocean in the subtidal and intertidal zone off the Galapagos Islands.
