= Turbo heisei =

Scientific classification
- Kingdom: Animalia
- Phylum: Mollusca
- Class: Gastropoda
- Subclass: Vetigastropoda
- Order: Trochida
- Family: Turbinidae
- Genus: Turbo
- Species: T. heisei

Binomial name
- Turbo heisei Prado, 1999

Synonyms
- Turbo (Taeniaturbo) heisei Prado, 1999

Species of gastropod

Turbo heisei is a species of sea snail, a marine gastropod mollusk in the family Turbinidae, the turban snails.

Taxonomic status: Some authors place the name in the subgenus Turbo (Taeniaturbo)

== Distribution ==
This species occurs in the Atlantic Ocean off Brazil.

== Description ==
The maximum recorded shell length is 25 mm.

== Habitat ==
Minimum recorded depth is 20 m. Maximum recorded depth is 97 m.
