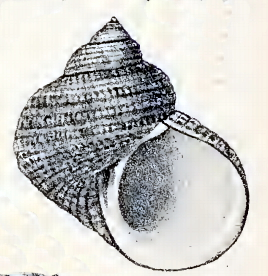
- Drawing of a shell of Turbo moluccensis

Scientific classification
- Kingdom: Animalia
- Phylum: Mollusca
- Class: Gastropoda
- Subclass: Vetigastropoda
- Order: Trochida
- Family: Turbinidae
- Genus: Turbo
- Species: T. moluccensis

Binomial name
- Turbo moluccensis Philippi, 1846

Synonyms
- Turbo granoliratus G.B. Sowerby III, 1908; Turbo (Marmarostoma) granoliratus Sowerby, G.B. III, 1908; Turbo seruiensis Smits & Moolenbeek, 1995; Turbo (Marmarostoma) seruiensis Smits & R.G. Moolenbeek, 1995

= Turbo moluccensis =

Species of gastropod

Turbo moluccensis is a species of sea snail, a marine gastropod mollusk in the family Turbinidae, the turban snails.

== Notes ==
Additional information regarding this species:

- Taxonomic status: Some authors place the name in the subgenus Turbo (Marmarostoma)

== Description ==
The size of the shell attains 54 mm. The umbilicate shell has a globose-conoid shape. Its color pattern is green, rufous marbled. The whorls are rounded. The upper whorls are reddish, spirally lirate, the line unequal, slightly elevated, separated by narrow obsoletely crenulated interstices. The aperture is subcircular. The lip is within green-margined and obsoletely crenulated.

== Distribution ==
This marine species is found off Indonesia and Papua New Guinea.
