= Turbo moolenbeeki =

Scientific classification
- Kingdom: Animalia
- Phylum: Mollusca
- Class: Gastropoda
- Subclass: Vetigastropoda
- Order: Trochida
- Superfamily: Trochoidea
- Family: Turbinidae
- Genus: Turbo
- Species: T. moolenbeeki

Binomial name
- Turbo moolenbeeki Dekkers & Dekker, 2016

Synonyms
- Turbo (Turbo) moolenbeeki Dekkers & Dekker, 2016

Species of gastropod

Turbo moolenbeeki is a species of sea snail, a marine gastropod mollusk, in the family Turbinidae, the turban snails.
