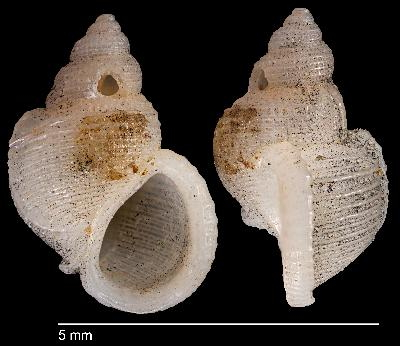
- Shell of Alvania carinata (syntype at MNHN, Paris)

Scientific classification
- Kingdom: Animalia
- Phylum: Mollusca
- Class: Gastropoda
- Subclass: Caenogastropoda
- Order: Littorinimorpha
- Superfamily: Rissooidea
- Family: Rissoidae
- Genus: Alvania
- Species: A. carinata

Binomial name
- Alvania carinata (da Costa, 1778)

Synonyms
- Alvania russinoniaca Locard, 1886; Galeodina carinata (da Costa, 1778) superseded combination; Galeodina striatula (da Costa, 1778); Galeodina striatula var. minorecarinata Monterosato, 1884; Rissoa (Galeodina) carinata (da Costa, 1778); Rissoa (Galeodina) carinata var. ecarinata Bucquoy, Dautzenberg & Dollfus, 1884; † Rissoa labiata R. A. Philippi, 1836 junior subjective synonym; Rissoa striatula (Montagu, 1803); Rissoa trochlea Michaud, 1830; Turbo carinatus da Costa, 1778; Turbo monilis W. Turton, 1819; Turbo striatulus da Costa, 1778; Turbo striatulus Montagu, 1803

= Alvania carinata =

Species of gastropod

Alvania carinata is a species of small sea snail, a marine gastropod mollusk or micromollusk in the family Rissoidae.

== Description ==
The length of the shell attains 3.4 mm, its diameter 2.6 mm.

(Described as Rissoa striatula) The rather solid shell is opaque and yellowish white. It is thinly longitudinally striate in the interstices between much stronger spiral ridges, which carinate and shoulder the whorls. The aperture is a little dilated below, smooth within, ridged-varicose externally.

== Distribution ==
This species occurs in the Arctic Ocean, northeast Atlantic Ocean and in the Mediterranean Sea (France, Greece, Turkey)
