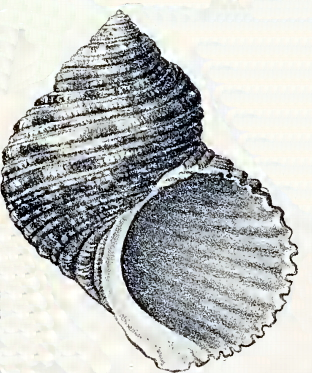
- Drawing with an apertural view of a shell of Turbo setosus

Scientific classification
- Kingdom: Animalia
- Phylum: Mollusca
- Class: Gastropoda
- Subclass: Vetigastropoda
- Order: Trochida
- Family: Turbinidae
- Genus: Turbo
- Species: T. setosus

Binomial name
- Turbo setosus Gmelin, 1791

Synonyms
- Turbo (Marmarostoma) setosus Gmelin, 1791; Turbo maoa Curtiss, 1938; Turbo sparvenius Gmelin, 1791; Turbo vericulum Röding, 1798

= Turbo setosus =

Species of gastropod

Turbo setosus, common name the rough turban, is a species of sea snail, marine gastropod mollusk in the family Turbinidae.

- Taxonomic status: Some authors place the name in the subgenus Turbo (Marmarostoma)

== Description ==
The length of the shell varies between 22 mm and 80 mm. The solid, imperforate shell has an ovate-pointed shape. Its color pattern is whitish, or greenish, maculated with brown and olive. The conic spire is acute. The six whorls are convex, striate and spirally lirate. The ridges are unequal, wider than the interspaces, frequently with interstitial lirulae. The large aperture lis oval and white within. The outer lip is frequently green-tinged and is fluted. The arcuate columella is deflexed and dilated at its base.

The circular operculum is flat or slightly concave within. It contains four whorls and a subcentral apex. The outer surface is convex, brown, coarsely granulose in the middle, paler and more finely granular at the margins.

== Distribution ==
This species occurs in the Indian Ocean off Madagascar, the Mascarene Basin and Mauritius; in the Central and Southwest Pacific; off Australia.

== Notes ==
- Hedley, C. (1899). The Mollusca of Funafuti. Part 1. Gastropoda. Australian Museum Memoires. 3 (7)
- Allan, J., 1950. Australian Shells: with related animals living in the sea, in freshwater and on the land. Georgian House, Melbourne. xix 470 pp
- Demond, J., 1957. Micronesian reef associated gastropods. Pacific Science, 11(3):275–341
- Salvat, B. & Rives, C. (1975). Coquillages de Polynésie. Papeete - Tahiti : les editions du pacifique. pp. 1–391
- Drivas, J. & M. Jay (1988). Coquillages de La Réunion et de l'île Maurice
- Alf A. & Kreipl K. (2003). A Conchological Iconography: The Family Turbinidae, Subfamily Turbininae, Genus Turbo. Conchbooks, Hackenheim Germany.
- Williams, S.T. (2007). Origins and diversification of Indo-West Pacific marine fauna: evolutionary history and biogeography of turban shells (Gastropoda, Turbinidae). Biological Journal of the Linnean Society, 2007, 92, 573–592
