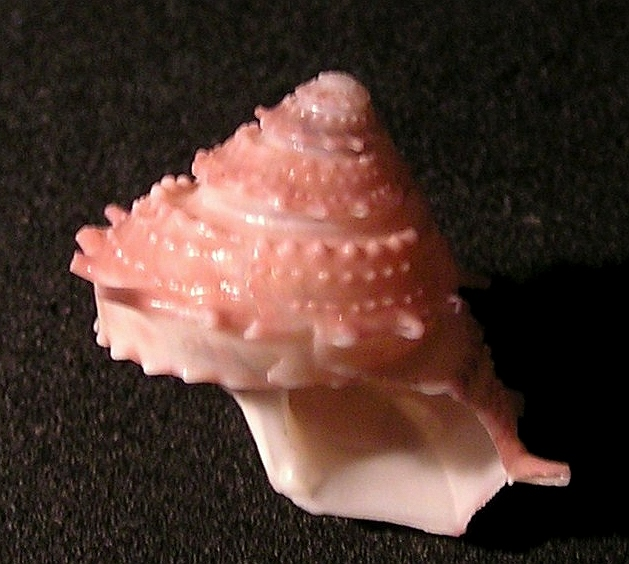
- Apertural view of a shell of Bolma bartschii

Scientific classification
- Kingdom: Animalia
- Phylum: Mollusca
- Class: Gastropoda
- Subclass: Vetigastropoda
- Order: Trochida
- Family: Turbinidae
- Genus: Bolma
- Species: B. bartschii

Binomial name
- Bolma bartschii Dall, 1913

Synonyms
- Astraea (?) asteriola Kuroda & Habe, 1952; Bolma (Galeoastraea) asteriola Dall, W.H., 1925; Turbo asteriola Dall, 1925

= Bolma bartschii =

Species of gastropod

Bolma bartschii, common name Bartsch's star bolma, is a species of sea snail, a marine gastropod mollusk in the family Turbinidae, the turban snails.

== Description ==
(Original description by W.H. Dall) The size of the shell varies between 12 mm and 50 mm. The thin, trochoid shell is yellowish white with rose-colored flammules and nebulosities, with more or less articulation on the spiral ridges. The glassy nucleus is very minute. The nepionic shell (i.e. the whorls immediately following the embryonic whorls) are white, depressed above, of three rather rounded whorls with numerous low radial plications or riblets. The subsequent whorls number four, with a sparsely imbricate keel at the periphery and a prominent, beaded, spiral cord one-third of the way from the appressed posterior suture toward the periphery. This arrangement gives a channeled or turriculate aspect to the shell in the sutural region. The body whorl has a third keel, imbricate like the peripheral one but less prominent, bordering the base. The space between the beaded cord and the peripheral keel is on the upper whorls finely spirally striated, but on the last whorl, first two, and then a third, small spiral equidistant threads, articulated white and dark rose color, are developed. The imbrications on the two keels are short, distant, subspinose, and channeled in front. The base of the shell is nearly smooth, with fine spiral striation and a widespread, transparent, thin layer of enamel in front of the aperture. The smooth columella is arcuate and pearly. The outer lip is thin, sharp and markedly expanded. The throat is pearly. The aperture is quite oblique. The white operculum is smooth, constructed like that of Bolma rugosa, but with the external depression much less marked.

The radula shows a central tooth of squarish form without cusps, on a larger base, with four laterals on each side. Their cusps are denticulate with a prominent spur below, behind the cusp, and the usual large mass of uncini.

This shell is so thin and delicate that it was a surprise to find it possessing a heavy calcareous operculum.

== Distribution ==
This marine species occurs off the Philippines and Indonesia.
