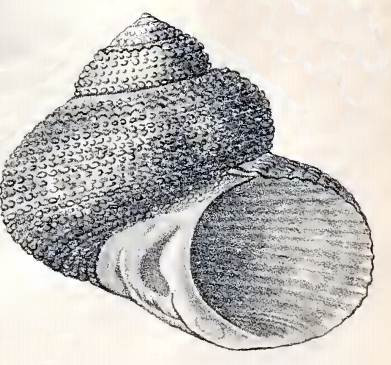
- Modelia granosa (Martyn, 1784); family Turbinidae

Scientific classification
- Kingdom: Animalia
- Phylum: Mollusca
- Class: Gastropoda
- Subclass: Vetigastropoda
- Order: Trochida
- Superfamily: Trochoidea
- Family: Turbinidae
- Genus: Modelia; Gray, 1850

= Modelia =

Genus of gastropods

Modelia is a genus of medium to large sea snails in which the shell has a pearly interior and the snail has a calcareous operculum; marine gastropod mollusks, marine gastropod molluscs in the family Turbinidae, the turban snails.

== Species ==
Species within the genus Modelia include:

- Modelia granosa (Martyn, 1784)

Species brought into synonymy

- Modelia guttata A. Adams, 1863: synonym of Bolma guttata (A. Adams, 1863)
