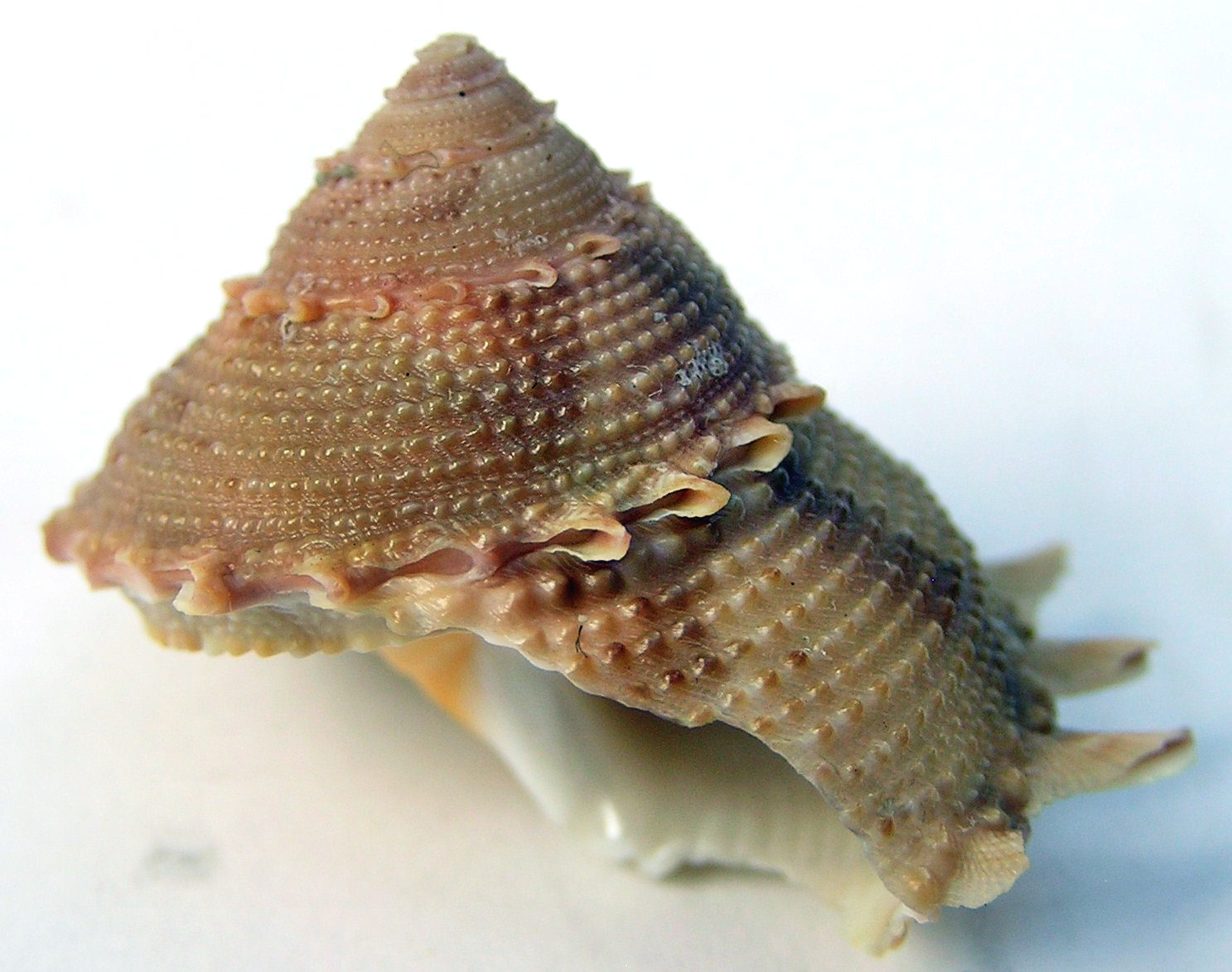
- Apertural view of a shell of Bolma tamikoana

Scientific classification
- Kingdom: Animalia
- Phylum: Mollusca
- Class: Gastropoda
- Subclass: Vetigastropoda
- Order: Trochida
- Family: Turbinidae
- Genus: Bolma
- Species: B. tamikoana

Binomial name
- Bolma tamikoana (Shikama, 1973)

Synonyms
- Bolma tamikoana shikamai Habe, 1978; Bolma tamikoana tamikoana (Shikama, 1973); Bolma (Galeoastraea) tamikoana tamikoana (Shikama, 1973); Galeoastraea tamikoae shikamai Habe, 1978; Galeoastraea tamikoae Habe, 1978; Galeoastraea tayloriana tamikoana Shikama, 1973

= Bolma tamikoana =

Species of gastropod

Bolma tamikoana is a species of sea snail, a marine gastropod mollusk in the family Turbinidae, the turban snails.

The subspecies Bolma tamikoana flava Beu & Ponder, 1979 is accepted as Bolma flava Beu & Ponder, 1979

== Description ==
The size of the shell varies between 30 mm and 45 mm.

== Distribution ==
This marine species occurs off Japan, the East China Sea, the South China Sea, Indonesia, the Philippines, in the Central Indo-West Pacific and off Australia (Northern Territory).
