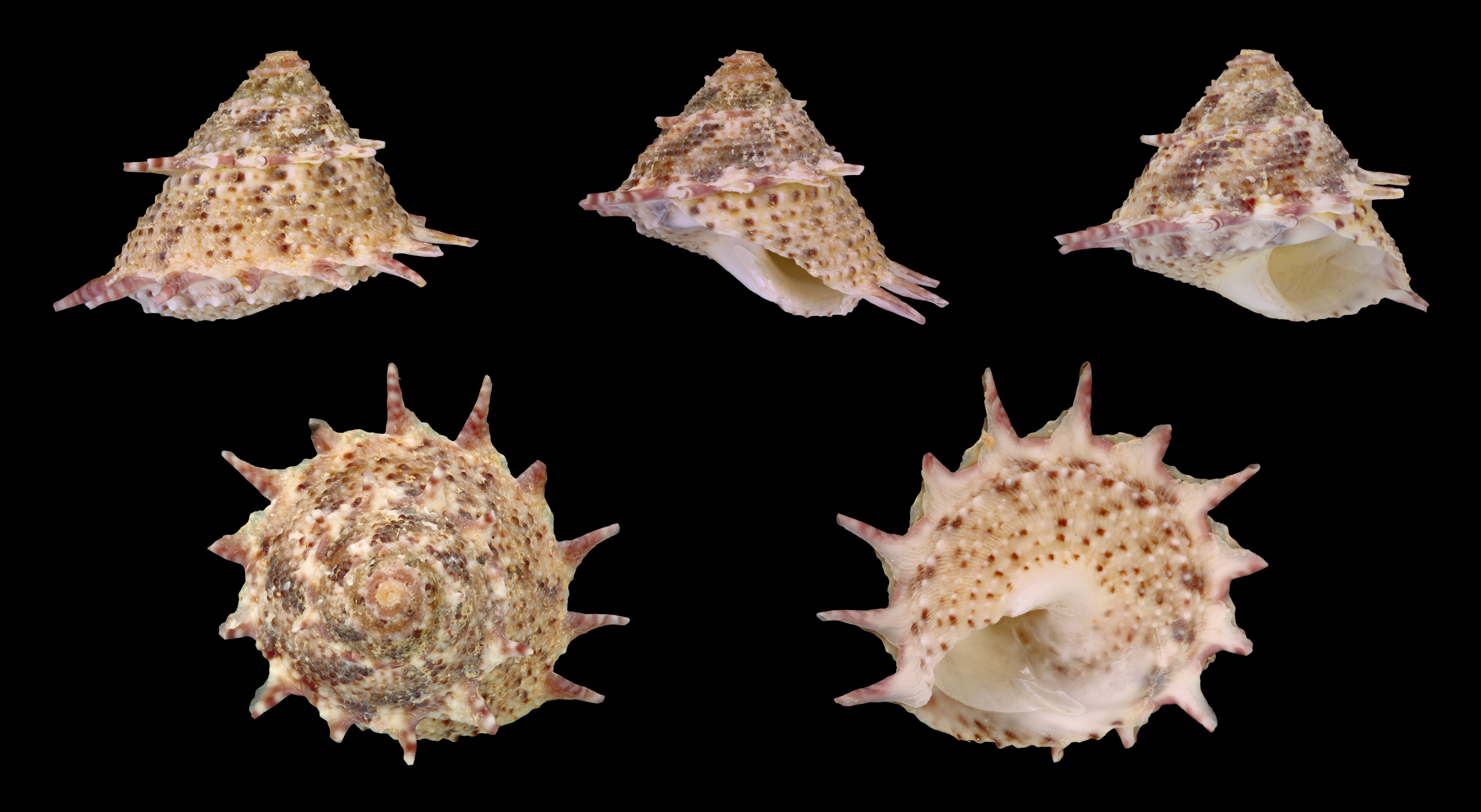

Scientific classification
- Kingdom: Animalia
- Phylum: Mollusca
- Class: Gastropoda
- Subclass: Vetigastropoda
- Order: Trochida
- Family: Turbinidae
- Genus: Bolma
- Species: B. persica

Binomial name
- Bolma persica (Dall, 1907)

Synonyms
- Astraea persica Dall, 1907 (original combination); Bolma erectospina Kosuge, 1983; Bolma (Galeoastraea) persica (Dall, 1907); Galeoastraea erectospinosa Habe & Okutani, 1980; Pseudastralium persica Dall, W.H., 1907

= Bolma persica =

Species of gastropod

Bolma persica, common name the peach bolma, is a species of sea snail, a marine gastropod mollusk in the family Turbinidae, the turban snails.

== Description ==
The size of the shell varies between 15 mm and 40 mm. Its color pattern is creamy yellow with radial dark purple flammules dorsally and ventrally, grading off on the anterior side to crimson and rose pink. The separate tubercles have dark color giving the effect of dots. The rather small shell has a conical shape. It shows long, spirally arranged peripheral spines on all five whorls (about equal to width of shoulder). The whorls are flat-sided. The early whorls show, on the upper surface, five beaded spirals, between which on the later whorls are intercalated one or more much smaller beaded or simple threads. These are crossed obliquely by small, sharp, imbricated lamellae, visible only under a lens. At the periphery the thin keel is produced into narrow, guttered spines with two or three radial threads on each. The body whorl carries 10 to 15 triangular spines. The base is elegantly flammulated with dark purple, sculptured like the upper side, having one strong nodulous and seven or eight smaller spirals and the same imbricate minor sculpture. The peripheral keel should have, when intact, about 20 spines. The shell lacks a sutural channel. The white columella has a very narrow basal, milk-white callus. The aperture is rounded. The outer lip leadis at the suture, which is laid on the prominent basal spiral before mentioned. The aperture is white except where the color markings show through the glaze.

This species closely resembles Bolma guttata (A. Adams, 1863) but the spire is relatively shorter and has a less pronounced granular sculpture. The spines when perfect are about 4 mm. long.

== Distribution ==
This marine species occurs off the Philippines, Japan and Vietnam.
