= Bolma sabinae =

Scientific classification
- Kingdom: Animalia
- Phylum: Mollusca
- Class: Gastropoda
- Subclass: Vetigastropoda
- Order: Trochida
- Family: Turbinidae
- Genus: Bolma
- Species: B. sabinae

Binomial name
- Bolma sabinae Alf & Kreipl, 2004

Species of gastropod

Bolma sabinae is a species of sea snail, a marine gastropod mollusk in the family Turbinidae, the turban snails.

== Description ==
The height of the shell attains 16.2 mm, its diameter 19.1 mm. The coniform shell consists of five whorls and resembles Bolma minutiradiosa Kosuge, 1983, but the thick columellar and umbilical callus is red-stained.

== Distribution ==
This marine species occurs off Madagascar.
