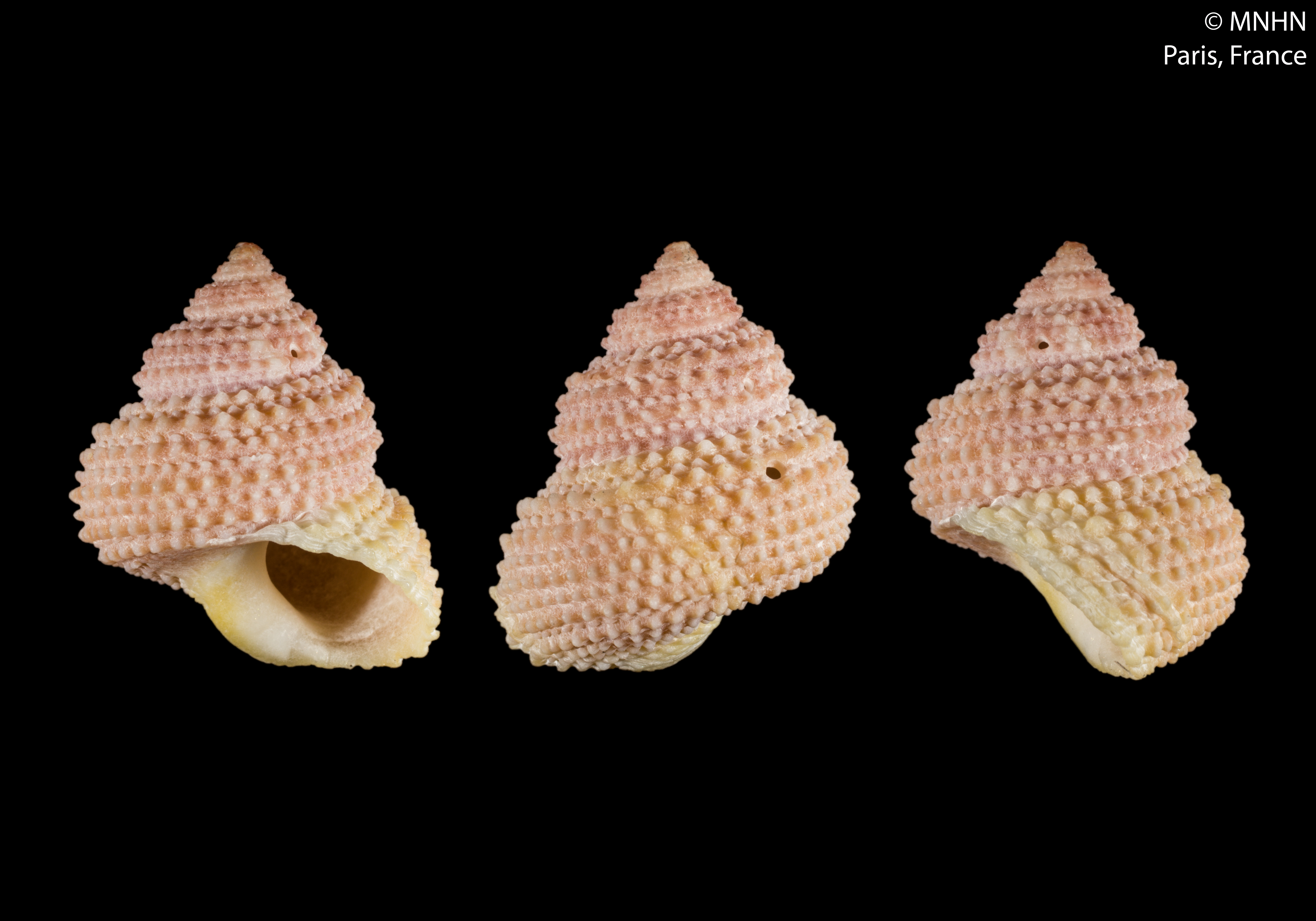
- Shell of Bolma maestratii (holotype at MNHN, Paris)

Scientific classification
- Kingdom: Animalia
- Phylum: Mollusca
- Class: Gastropoda
- Subclass: Vetigastropoda
- Order: Trochida
- Family: Turbinidae
- Genus: Bolma
- Species: B. maestratii

Binomial name
- Bolma maestratii Alf & Kreipl, 2009

= Bolma maestratii =

Species of gastropod

Bolma maestratii is a species of sea snail, a marine gastropod mollusk in the family Turbinidae, the turban snails.

== Distribution ==
This marine species occurs off the Austral Islands and French Polynesia
