= Bolma microconcha =

Scientific classification
- Kingdom: Animalia
- Phylum: Mollusca
- Class: Gastropoda
- Subclass: Vetigastropoda
- Order: Trochida
- Family: Turbinidae
- Genus: Bolma
- Species: B. microconcha

Binomial name
- Bolma microconcha Kosuge, 1985

Synonyms
- Bolma (Bolma) microconcha Kosuge, 1985

Species of gastropod

Bolma microconcha is a species of sea snail, a marine gastropod mollusk in the family Turbinidae, the turban snails.

== Description ==
The size the shell varies between 9 mm and 13 mm.

== Distribution ==
This marine species occurs off the Philippines Sabah and Malaysia.
