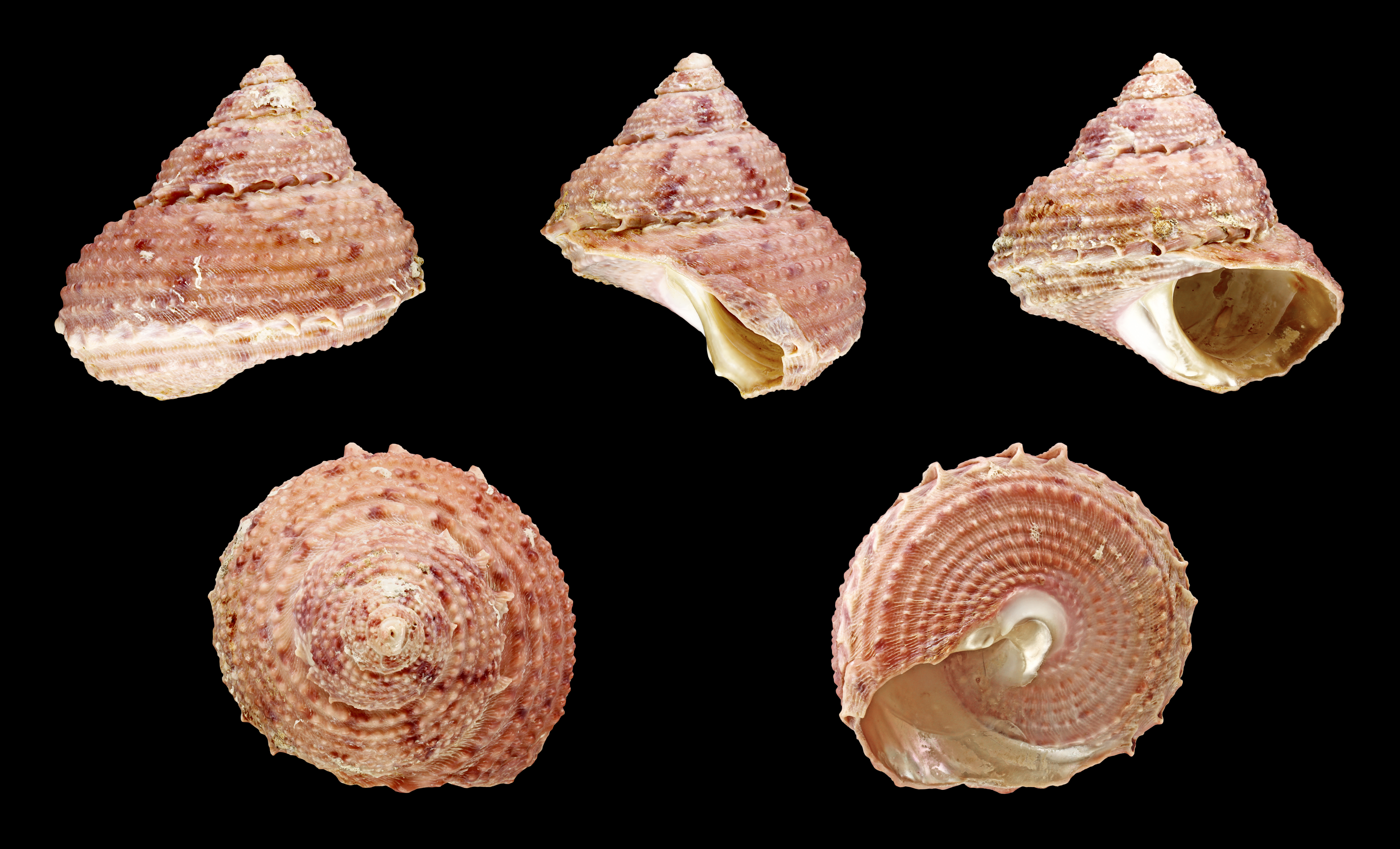

Scientific classification
- Kingdom: Animalia
- Phylum: Mollusca
- Class: Gastropoda
- Subclass: Vetigastropoda
- Order: Trochida
- Family: Turbinidae
- Genus: Bolma
- Species: B. millegranosa

Binomial name
- Bolma millegranosa (Kuroda & Habe in Habe, 1958)

Synonyms
- Bolma formosana (Shikama, 1977); Bolma (Bolma) formosana Shikama, T., 1977; Bolma guttata millegranosa (Kuroda & Habe, in Habe, 1958); Galeoastraea formosana Shikama, 1977; Galeoastraea millegranosa Kuroda & Habe in Habe, 1958

= Bolma millegranosa =

Species of gastropod

Bolma millegranosa is a species of sea snail, a marine gastropod mollusk in the family Turbinidae, the turban snails.

== Distribution ==
This marine species occurs off Japan.
