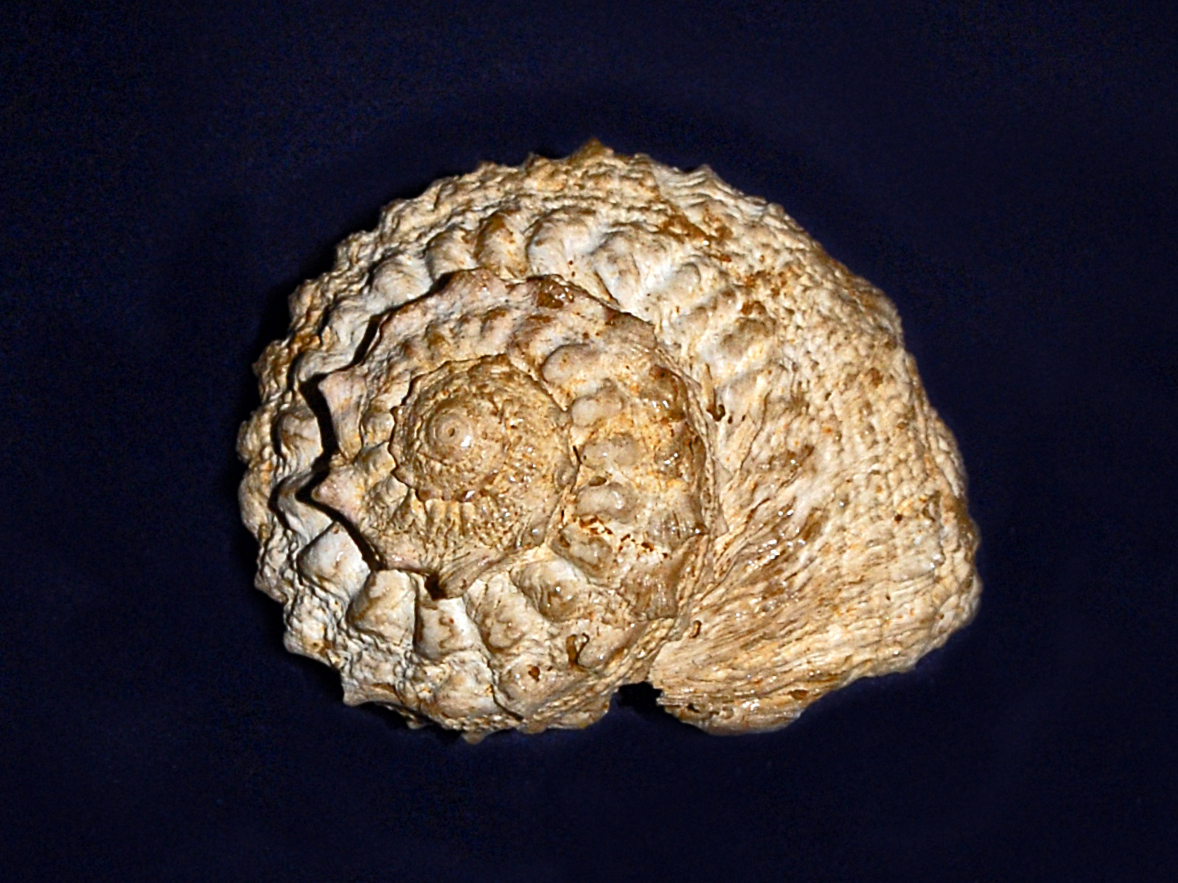
- A fossil shell of Bolma rugosa from Pliocene of Italy

Scientific classification
- Kingdom: Animalia
- Phylum: Mollusca
- Class: Gastropoda
- Subclass: Vetigastropoda
- Order: Trochida
- Superfamily: Trochoidea
- Family: Turbinidae
- Genus: Bolma; Risso, 1826

Type species
- Bolma rugosa Linnaeus, C., 1767

Synonyms
- Astralium (Bolma) Risso, 1826; Bolma (Ormastralium) Sacco, 1896 - alternate representation; Galeoastraea Habe, 1958 (not available); Hirasazaea Habe, 1958 (not available); † Incilaster Finlay, 1926; † Oobolma Sacco, 1896; † Ormastralium Sacco, 1896; Pseudastralium Schepman, 1908; Senobolma Okutani, 1964; Tubicanthus Swains, 1840; † Tylastralium Sacco, 1896

= Bolma =

Bolma Temporal range: Eocene–Recent

Genus of gastropods

Bolma is a genus of medium to large sea snails with a calcareous operculum, marine gastropod molluscs in the family Turbinidae, the turban snails.

== Fossil records ==
The genus is known from the Eocene to the Recent periods (age range: from 33.9 to 0.0 million years ago). Fossils shells have been found in France, Greece, Japan, Morocco, Spain, Vanuatu, Guam, Cyprus, Greece, South Africa, Spain, Austria, Italy, Slovakia, New Zealand, Australia and Tonga. There are about 5 extinct species.

== Description ==
The central teeth of the radula have no cusps. They have a narrow long basal plate, which is produced above the body of the tooth. The latter is wide, oval, and not reflected above. Its lower margin is not well-defined in my specimens which are, however, not stained. The laterals are of the usual form and bear cusps.

The imperforate shell has a turbinate shape. The spire is conic with whorls rounded at the periphery. The upper whorls are spiny. The base of the shell is convex. The operculum is nearly round with an excentric nucleus. The outside of the shell is polished, concave in the middle, with a convexity or rib upon the center of the spiral.

== Distribution ==
This marine genus has a wide distribution. It occurs in the Red Sea, the Eastern Indian Ocean, the West Pacific, the South China Sea, the East China Sea, and off South Africa, Indo-China, the Philippines, Japan, Indonesia, New Caledonia, New Zealand and Australia (New South Wales, Northern Territory, Queensland).

== Species ==
According to the World Register of Marine Species (WoRMS), the following species are included within the genus Bolma:

- †Bolma anacanthos Beu & Ponder, 1979
- Bolma andersoni (E.A. Smith, 1902)
- Bolma aureola (Hedley, 1907)
- †Bolma austroconica Beu & Ponder, 1979
- Bolma bartschii Dall, 1913
- Bolma bathyraphis (E. A. Smith, 1899)
- Bolma boucheti Alf & Kreipl, 2011
- Bolma castelinae Alf, Maestrati & Bouchet, 2010
- †Bolma crassigranosa Tenison Woods, 1877
- Bolma exotica (Okutani, 1969)
- Bolma flava Beu & Ponder, 1979
- †Bolma flindersi Tenison Woods, 1877
- Bolma fuscolineata Alf & Kreipl, 2009
- Bolma girgyllus (Reeve, 1861)
- †Bolma granosa Borson, 1821
- Bolma guttata (A. Adams, 1863)
- Bolma henica (Watson, 1885)
- Bolma jacquelineae (Marche-Marchad, 1957)
- Bolma johnstoni (Odhner, 1923)
- Bolma kermadecensis Beau & Ponder, 1979
- Bolma kiharai Kosuge, 1986
- Bolma kreipli Alf, Maestrati & Bouchet, 2010
- Bolma maestratii Alf & Kreipl, 2009
- Bolma mainbaza Alf, Maestrati & Bouchet, 2010
- †Bolma marshalli Thomson, 1908
- Bolma martinae Kreipl & Alf, 2005
- Bolma massieri Bozzetti, 1992
- †Bolma meynardi Michelotti, 1847
- Bolma microconcha Kosuge, 1985
- Bolma midwayensis (Habe & Kosuge, 1970)
- Bolma millegranosa Kuroda & Habe in Habe, 1958
- Bolma minuta Neubert, 1998
- Bolma minutiradiosa Kosuge, 1983
- Bolma modesta (Reeve, 1843)
- Bolma opaoana Bouchet & Métivier, 1983
- Bolma persica (Dall, 1907)
- Bolma pseudobathyraphis Alf, Maestrati & Bouchet, 2010
- Bolma recens Dell, 1967
- Bolma redoniana Landau, Van Dingenen & Ceulemans, 2023
- Bolma rugosa (Linnaeus, 1767)
- Bolma sabinae Alf & Kreipl, 2004
- Bolma somaliensis Beu & Ponder, 1979
- Bolma tamikoana (Shikama, 1973)
- Bolma tantalea Alf, Maestrati & Bouchet, 2010
- Bolma tayloriana (E.A. Smith, 1880)
- Bolma venusta (Okutani, 1969)

The following species are also included in the Indo-Pacific Molluscan Database

- Bolma (Galeoastraea) asteriola (Dall, 1925)

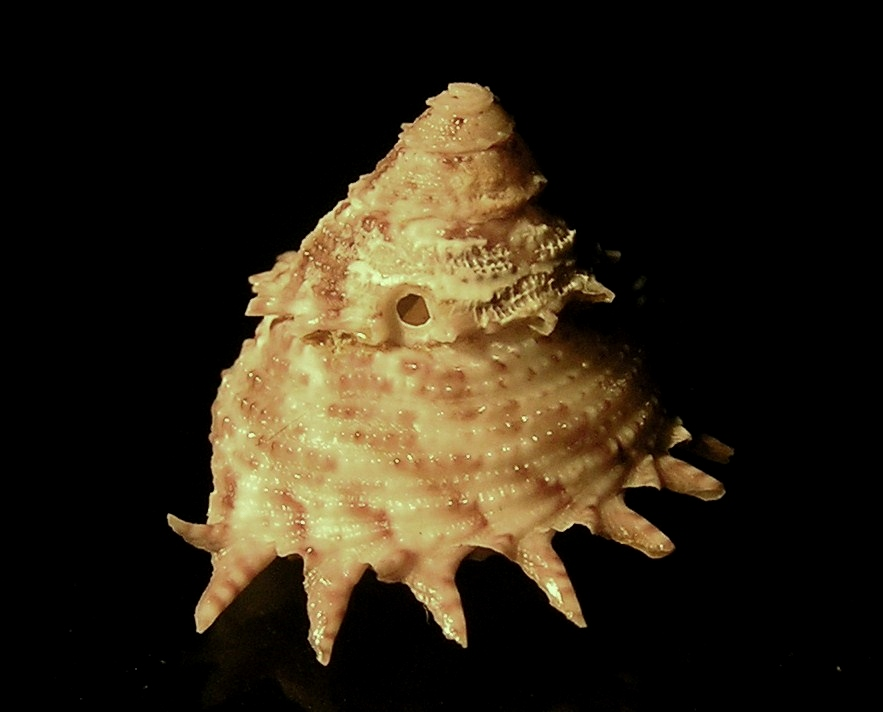
Bolma persica
