= Bolma martinae =

Scientific classification
- Kingdom: Animalia
- Phylum: Mollusca
- Class: Gastropoda
- Subclass: Vetigastropoda
- Order: Trochida
- Family: Turbinidae
- Genus: Bolma
- Species: B. martinae

Binomial name
- Bolma martinae Kreipl & Alf, 2005

Species of gastropod

Bolma martinae is a species of sea snail, a marine gastropod mollusk in the family Turbinidae, the turban snails.

== Description ==
The height of the shell attains 10 mm.

== Distribution ==
This marine species occurs off Papua New Guinea.
