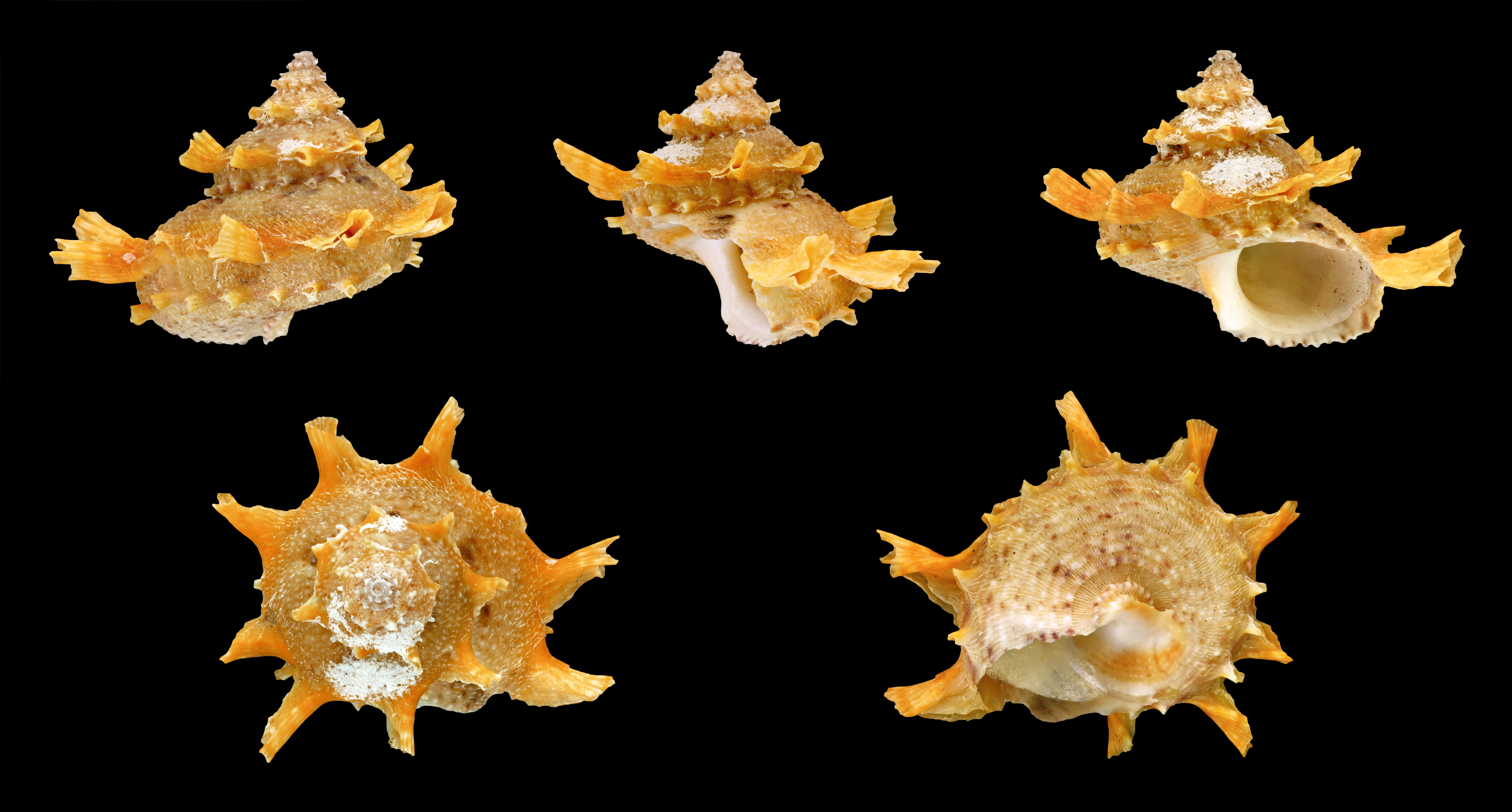

Scientific classification
- Kingdom: Animalia
- Phylum: Mollusca
- Class: Gastropoda
- Subclass: Vetigastropoda
- Order: Trochida
- Family: Turbinidae
- Genus: Bolma
- Species: B. girgyllus

Binomial name
- Bolma girgyllus (Reeve, 1861)

Synonyms
- Trochus girgyllus Reeve, 1861 (Basionym)

= Bolma girgyllus =

Species of gastropod

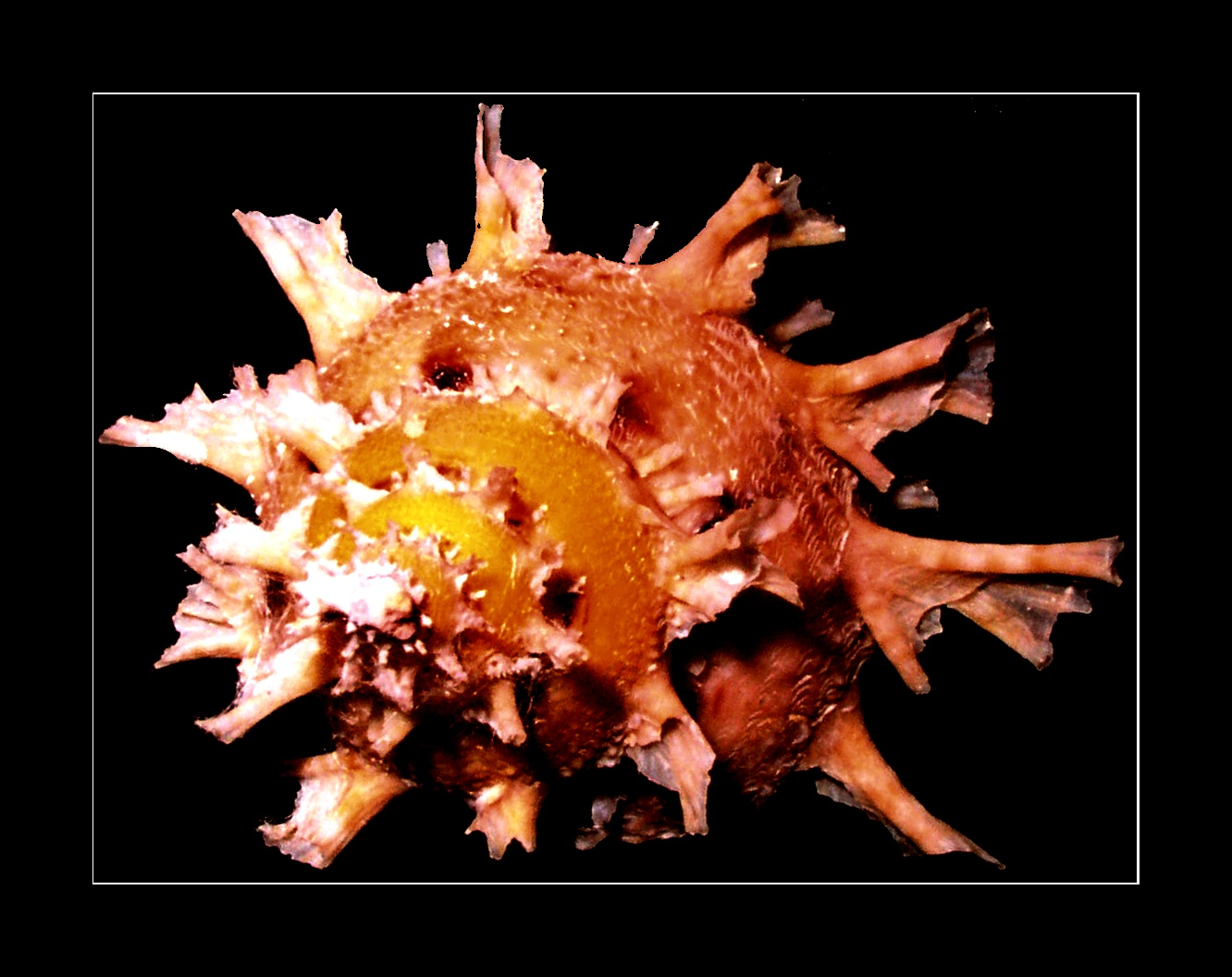
Dorsal view of shell of Bolma gyrgillus

Bolma girgyllus, common name the girgyllus star snail, is a species of sea snail, a marine gastropod mollusk in the family Turbinidae, the turban snails.

== Description ==
The shell has an equilateral-triangle profile, being approximately as tall as it is wide. The whorls are slightly inflated and are sculpted with strongly beaded spiral threads and a row of splayed hollow spines along the shoulder. A smaller second row of spines is situated below the shoulder on the last whorl. The base color of the shell is lavender to reddish purple with golden maculations outlined in a darker purple. The base has strong spiral threads which are weakly beaded and is paler in color than the body, with scattered darker and lighter beads along the threads. The siphonal canal is closed and is ivory white near the aperture with a golden yellow to orange edge adjacent to the base. The aperture is white and nacreous. The size of the adult shell varies between 30 mm and 80 mm.

== Distribution ==
This species occurs in the Pacific Ocean off the Philippines, the Moluccas, Taiwan and Vietnam.
