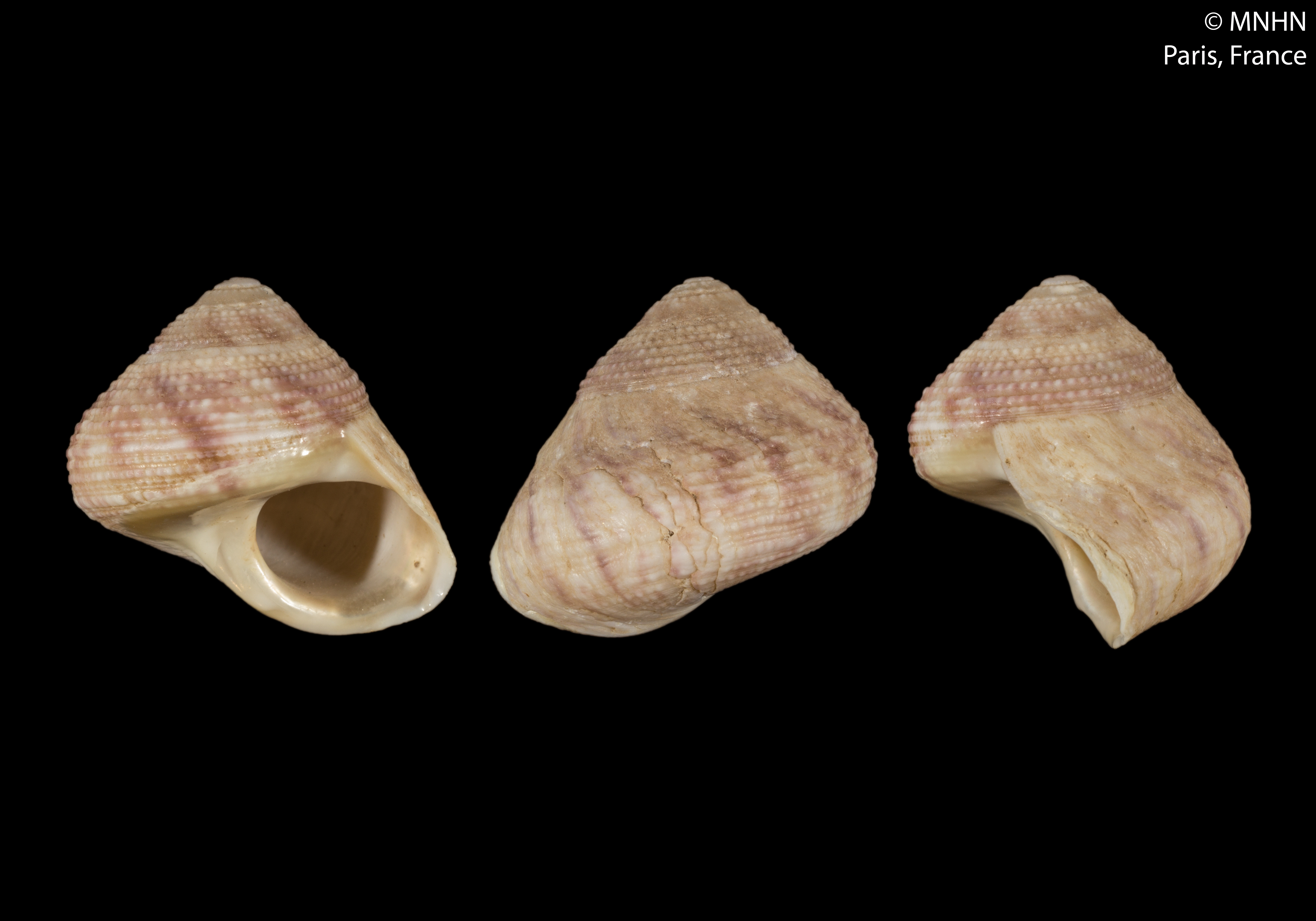
- Shell of Bolma tantalea (holotype at MNHN, Paris)

Scientific classification
- Kingdom: Animalia
- Phylum: Mollusca
- Class: Gastropoda
- Subclass: Vetigastropoda
- Order: Trochida
- Family: Turbinidae
- Genus: Bolma
- Species: B. tantalea

Binomial name
- Bolma tantalea Alf, Maestrati & Bouchet, 2010

= Bolma tantalea =

Species of gastropod

Bolma tantalea is a species of sea snail, a marine gastropod mollusk in the family Turbinidae, the turban snails.

== Distribution ==
This marine species occurs in the Pacific Ocean off Tahiti at depths between 390 m and 790 m.
