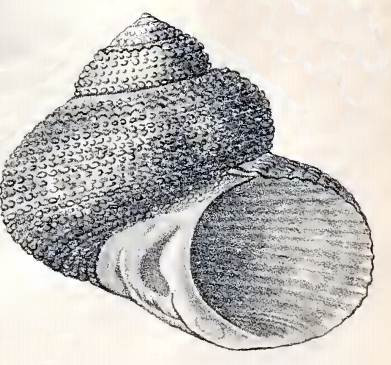
- Drawing with an apertural view of a shell of Modelia granosa

Scientific classification
- Kingdom: Animalia
- Phylum: Mollusca
- Class: Gastropoda
- Subclass: Vetigastropoda
- Order: Trochida
- Family: Turbinidae
- Genus: Modelia
- Species: M. granosa

Binomial name
- Modelia granosa (Martyn, 1784)

Synonyms
- Liotia (Arene) shandi Hutton, 1873; Modelia granosa (Martyn, 1784); Trochus granosus Martyn, 1784 (original combination); Turbo (Modelia) granosus (Martyn, 1784); Turbo granosus (Martyn, 1784); Turbo rubicundus Chemnitz, 1781; Turbo shandi Hutton, 1873

= Modelia granosa =

Species of gastropod

Modelia granosa, common name the southern cat's eye, is a medium to large species of sea snail which has a shell with a pearly interior and a calcareous operculum. It is a marine gastropod mollusc in the family Turbinidae, the turban snails.

== Description ==
The size of the shell varies between 25 mm and 80 mm. The orbiculate, imperforate shell has a depressed-conic shape. It is, pinkish yellow, unicolored, or clouded with purplish or brown. The seven whorls are rounded, the upper two smooth, the others closely minutely granulose in regular spiral series. The body whorl is rounded and descending. The subcircular aperture is white and iridescent within. The white columella is wide, subexcavated in the center. The thin callus is shining and rose-tinted.

The ovate operculum is flat within, with 5-6 whorls and a subcentral nucleus. On its outside it is white, thick, subgibbous, and minutely tuberculate at its center, subcanaliculate at its periphery.

== Distribution ==
It is only known to occur in New Zealand.

== Notes ==
Additional information regarding this species:

- Authority: Use of name from Martyn (1784) validated by ICZN Opinion 479.
