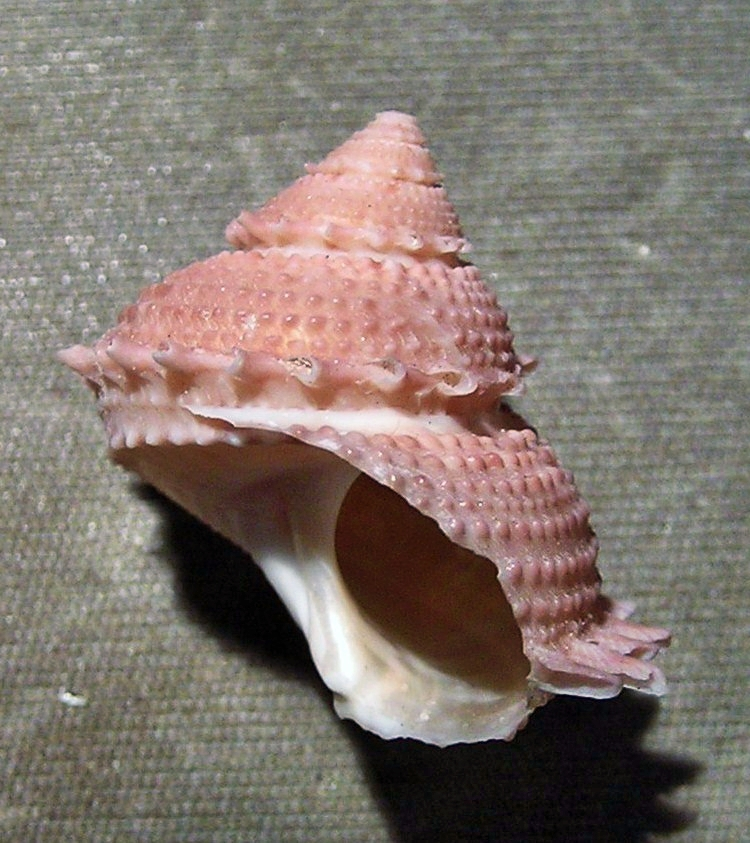
- Apertural view of a shell of Bolma henica

Scientific classification
- Kingdom: Animalia
- Phylum: Mollusca
- Class: Gastropoda
- Subclass: Vetigastropoda
- Order: Trochida
- Family: Turbinidae
- Genus: Bolma
- Species: B. henica

Binomial name
- Bolma henica (Watson, 1885)

Subspecies
- Bolma henica abyssorum (Schepman, 1908); Bolma henica henica (R. B. Watson, 1879); Bolma henica madagascarensis Nolf & Verstraeten, 2006

Synonyms
- Astralium henicus (Watson, 1885); Astralium (Pseudastralium) abyssorum Schepman, 1908; Guildfordia gloriosa Kuroda & Habe in Kira, 1961; Pseudastralium henicus gloriosum Kuroda & Habe in Kira, 1955; Turbo (Calcar) henica Watson, 1879; Turbo (Calcar) henicus R. B. Watson, 1879; Turbo henicus Watson, 1885 (original description)

= Bolma henica =

Species of gastropod

Bolma henica, common names abyssal dolma and deep sea star shell, is a species of sea snail, a marine gastropod mollusk in the family Turbinidae, the turban snails.

== Subspecies ==
Three subspecies are recognized:

- Bolma henica henica (R. B. Watson, 1879)
- Bolma henica abyssorum (Schepman, 1908)
- Bolma henica madagascarensis Nolf & Verstraeten, 2006

== Description ==
The size of the shell varies between 20 mm and 37 mm. The shell conical has a conical shape and is elevated with 7–8 whorls. Its color pattern is light yellowish ruddy, paler below. The apex is round. The first whorl is flattened. The upper three whorls are radiately ribbed, the following radiately slightly plicate in the direction of lines of growth, with a spiral series of rather large white separate beads upon the edge of the flattened shoulder below the suture, and six series of distinct small beads, separated by interstices of half their breadth upon the slope of the whorl. The periphery is sharply bicarinate, with the upper carina stellate with sharp compressed hollow spines, about twelve in number on body whorl. The lower carina contains thirty to thirty-five vaulted scales, becoming spines toward the aperture. Between the carinae there are four rows of beads. The base of the shell is flat, with about ten concentric rows of very regular beads. The aperture is oblique, white within. The white columella is bluntly toothed below. The white umbilical tract is polished and slightly ridged. The operculum is oval, within flat, brown. Its outside is thick, white, granulose with a slight flange on the outer margin.

== Distribution ==
This marine species occurs in the Indo-West Pacific in South Africa (Agulhas Bank), Fiji, Indonesia, Solomon Islands, Japan, the Philippines, and the east coast of Australia (New South Wales, Queensland). It has been recorded at depths between 11 and 597 m (36 and 1,959 ft), but mostly at a depth of a few hundred meters.
