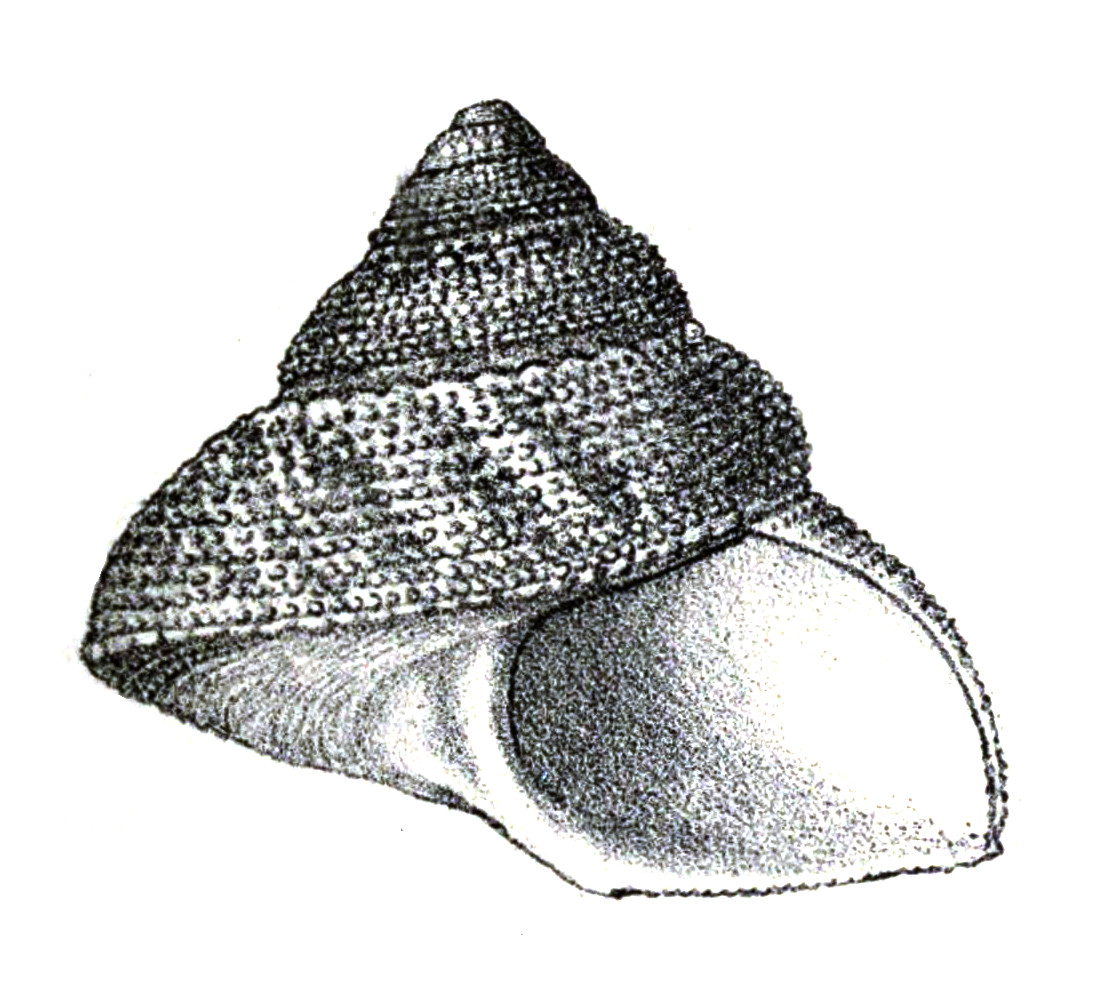
- Drawing with an apertural view of a shell of Bolma tayloriana

Scientific classification
- Kingdom: Animalia
- Phylum: Mollusca
- Class: Gastropoda
- Subclass: Vetigastropoda
- Order: Trochida
- Family: Turbinidae
- Genus: Bolma
- Species: B. tayloriana

Binomial name
- Bolma tayloriana (E. A. Smith, 1880)

Synonyms
- Astraea tayloriana (E. A. Smith, 1880); Astralium tayloriana Odhner, 1923; Astralium (Pomaulax) taylorianum (E.A. Smirh, 1880); Bolma (Galeoastraea) tayloriana (Smith, E.A., 1880); Galeoastraea tayloriana (E.A. Smith, 1880); Pachypoma tayloriana Sowerby, 1897; Turbo taylorianus E.A. Smith, 1880

= Bolma tayloriana =

Species of gastropod

Bolma tayloriana, common name Taylor's star shell, is a species of sea snail, a marine gastropod mollusk in the family Turbinidae, the turban snails.

== Description ==
The size of the shell varies between 60 mm and 90 mm. The imperforate, turbinate-conic shell is, flattened below, imperforate. It is purple rose colored. It is marked with indistinct and very oblique striations above, below white. The short-conic spire has rectilinear outlines. The about eight whorls are subconcave above, and slightly convex. They contain a subsutural subsquamose carina, and are encircled by numerous subequal granulose lirae. The body whorl is acutely carinated below the middle, slightly excavated above and flat below the carina. The base of the shell is white with an outer zone of purple red, concentrically ornamented with series of granules. The umbilical region has a white smooth callus, its margin stained with yellow. The arcuate columella is, white calloused.

== Distribution ==
This marine species occurs off Japan, in the South China Sea and off South Africa.
