= Bolma venusta =

Scientific classification
- Kingdom: Animalia
- Phylum: Mollusca
- Class: Gastropoda
- Subclass: Vetigastropoda
- Order: Trochida
- Family: Turbinidae
- Genus: Bolma
- Species: B. venusta

Binomial name
- Bolma venusta (Okutani, 1964)

Synonyms
- Bolma (Senobolma) venusta Okutani, 1964; Senobolma venusta Okutani, 1964

Species of gastropod

Bolma venusta is a species of sea snail, a marine gastropod mollusk in the family Turbinidae, the turban snails.

== Description ==
The length of the shell attains 15 mm.

== Distribution ==
This marine species occurs off the Philippines and Japan.
