= Bolma kermadecensis =

Conservation status
- Naturally Uncommon (NZ TCS)

Scientific classification
- Kingdom: Animalia
- Phylum: Mollusca
- Class: Gastropoda
- Subclass: Vetigastropoda
- Order: Trochida
- Family: Turbinidae
- Genus: Bolma
- Species: B. kermadecensis

Binomial name
- Bolma kermadecensis Beu & Ponder, 1979

Species of gastropod

Bolma kermadecensis is a species of sea snail, a marine gastropod mollusc in the family Turbinidae, the turban snails.

== Description ==
Looks like a spikey seashell. It can be found in a variety of colors and sizes, usually at a height of 37 mm and a width of 45 mm.

== Distribution ==
The species is endemic to New Zealand and occurs the Kermadec Islands.

== Sources ==
- Marshall, B.A. 1979: The Trochidae and Turbinidae of the Kermadec Ridge (Mollusca: Gastropoda), New Zealand Journal of Zoology, 6(4)
