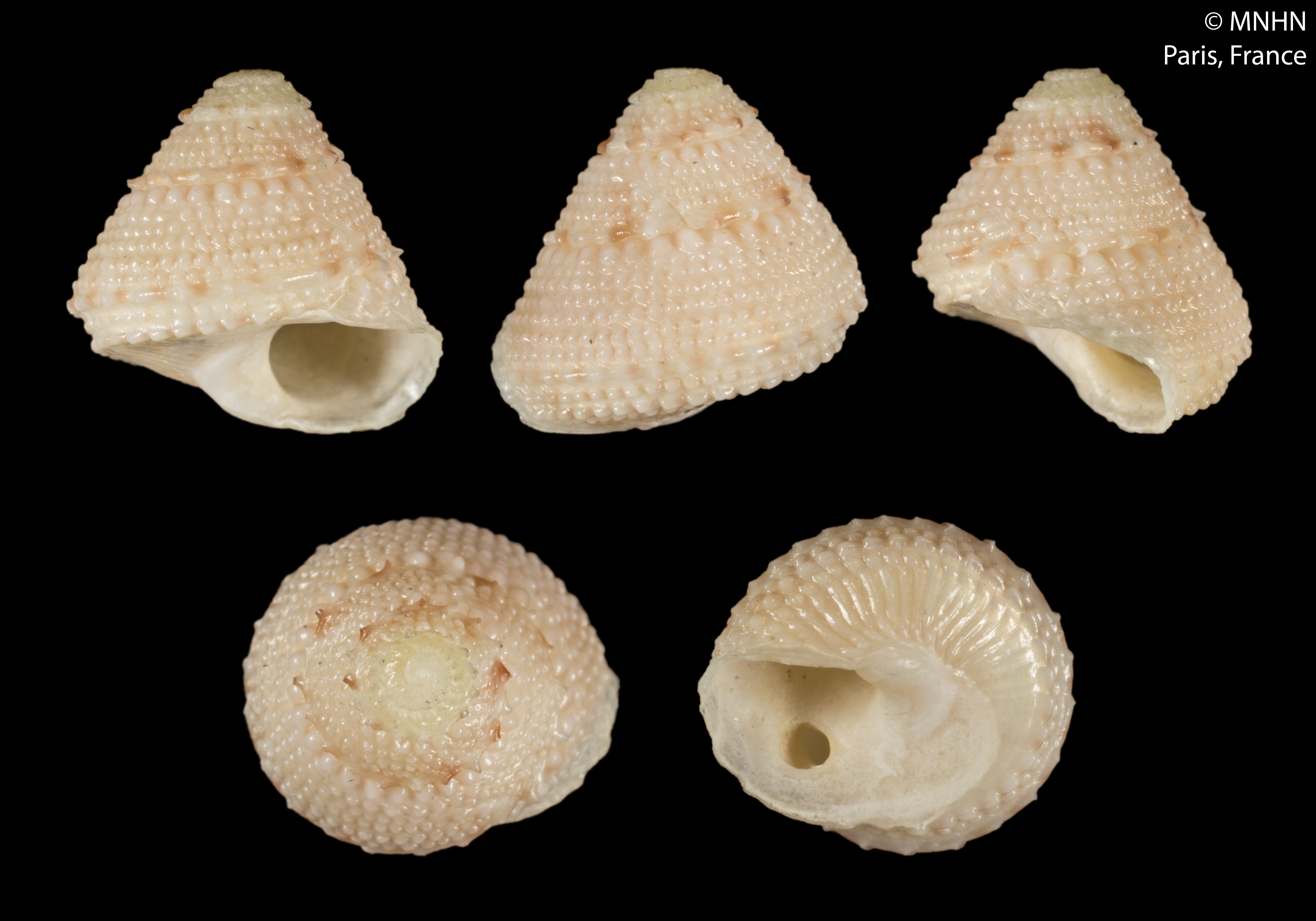
- Shell of Bolma boucheti (holotype at MNHN, Paris)

Scientific classification
- Kingdom: Animalia
- Phylum: Mollusca
- Class: Gastropoda
- Subclass: Vetigastropoda
- Order: Trochida
- Family: Turbinidae
- Genus: Bolma
- Species: B. boucheti

Binomial name
- Bolma boucheti Alf & Kreipl, 2011

= Bolma boucheti =

Species of gastropod

Bolma boucheti is a species of sea snail, a marine gastropod mollusk in the family Turbinidae, the turban snails.

== Distribution ==
This marine species occurs off New Caledonia.
