= Bolma crassigranosa =

Scientific classification
- Kingdom: Animalia
- Phylum: Mollusca
- Class: Gastropoda
- Subclass: Vetigastropoda
- Order: Trochida
- Superfamily: Trochoidea
- Family: Turbinidae
- Genus: Bolma
- Species: †B. crassigranosa

Binomial name
- †Bolma crassigranosa (Tenison Woods, 1877)

Synonyms
- Astralium (Calcar) ornatissimum Tenison Woods, 1877; Astralium ornatissimum Tenison Woods, 1877; Gibbula crassigranosa Tenison Woods, 1877

Extinct species of gastropod

Bolma crassigranosa is an extinct species of sea snail, a marine gastropod mollusk, in the family Turbinidae, the turban snails.

== Distribution ==
This species occurs in Tasmania.
