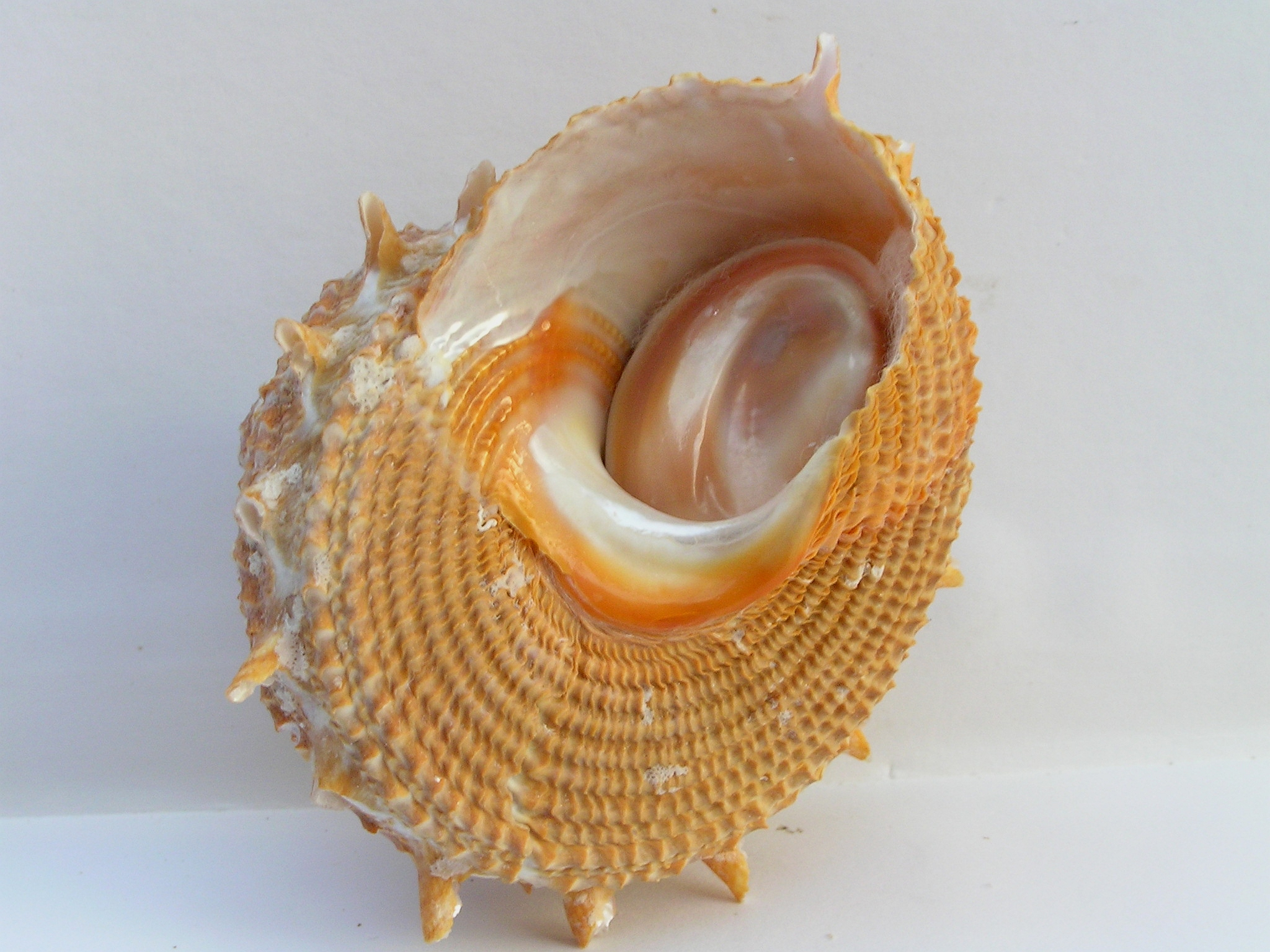
- Apertural view of a shell of Bolma aureola

Scientific classification
- Kingdom: Animalia
- Phylum: Mollusca
- Class: Gastropoda
- Subclass: Vetigastropoda
- Order: Trochida
- Family: Turbinidae
- Genus: Bolma
- Species: B. aureola

Binomial name
- Bolma aureola (Hedley, 1907)

Synonyms
- Astralium aureolum Hedley, 1907; Calcar aureola Iredale, T. & McMichael, D.F. 1962

= Bolma aureola =

Species of gastropod

Bolma aureola, common name the golden turbo shell or the scaly star shell, is a species of sea snail, a marine gastropod mollusk in the family Turbinidae, the turban snails.

== Description ==
(Original description by Ch. Hedley) The size of the shell varies between 60 mm and 100 mm. The large, massive, imperforate shell has a conical shape and contains seven whorls. The spire is elevate, later whorls becoming subscalar. The colour is a uniform dull brick-red, except a brilliant cadmium-orange ring round the aperture. The sculpture : the earlier whorls are strongly radiately plicate below the sutures. The periphery is armed with short, broad, downwardly directed spines becoming obsolete towards the aperture. On the penultimate whorl they number sixteen. Close spiral cords densely beset with imbricating scales cover the surface of the shell. Above there are ten cords carrying more distant hooded scales obliquely connected with those above and below. On the base there are also ten cords with more crowded scales. The base of the shell is flattened. The aperture is very oblique, subcircular, within and upon the columella pearly. A narrow inner margin to the lip continuous with an axial callus pad is bright cadmium-orange. The operculum is pale orange, oblong. Its nucleus is subterminal, hollow medially between two ribs, one of which rises proximally into a heavy callus mound.

The subscalar whorls, peripheral thorns and orange mouth of Bolma. aureolum distinguish it.

== Distribution ==
This marine species is endemic to Australia and occurs off New South Wales and Queensland.

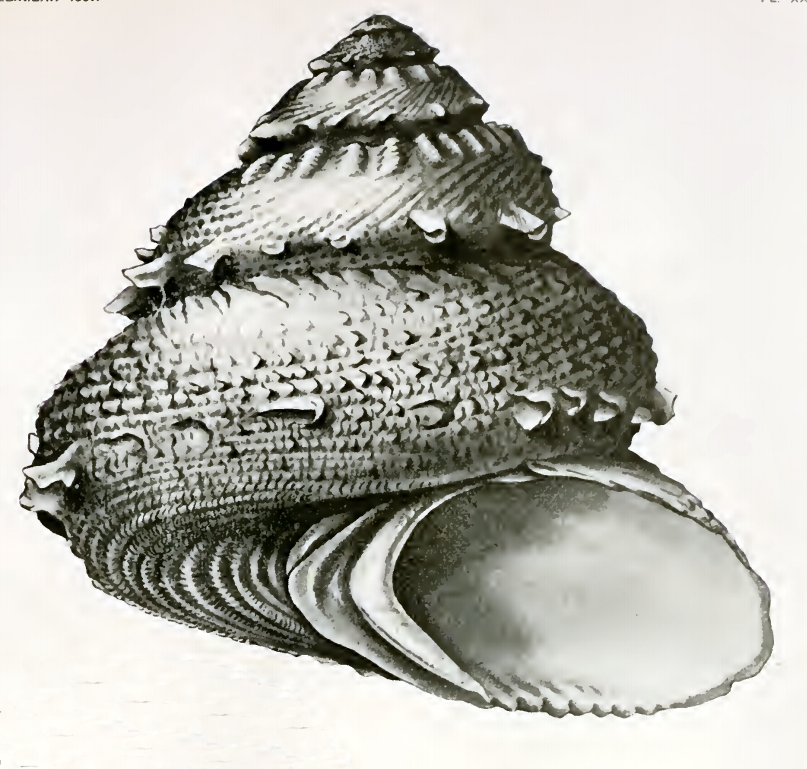
Original drawing of a shell of Bolma aureola
