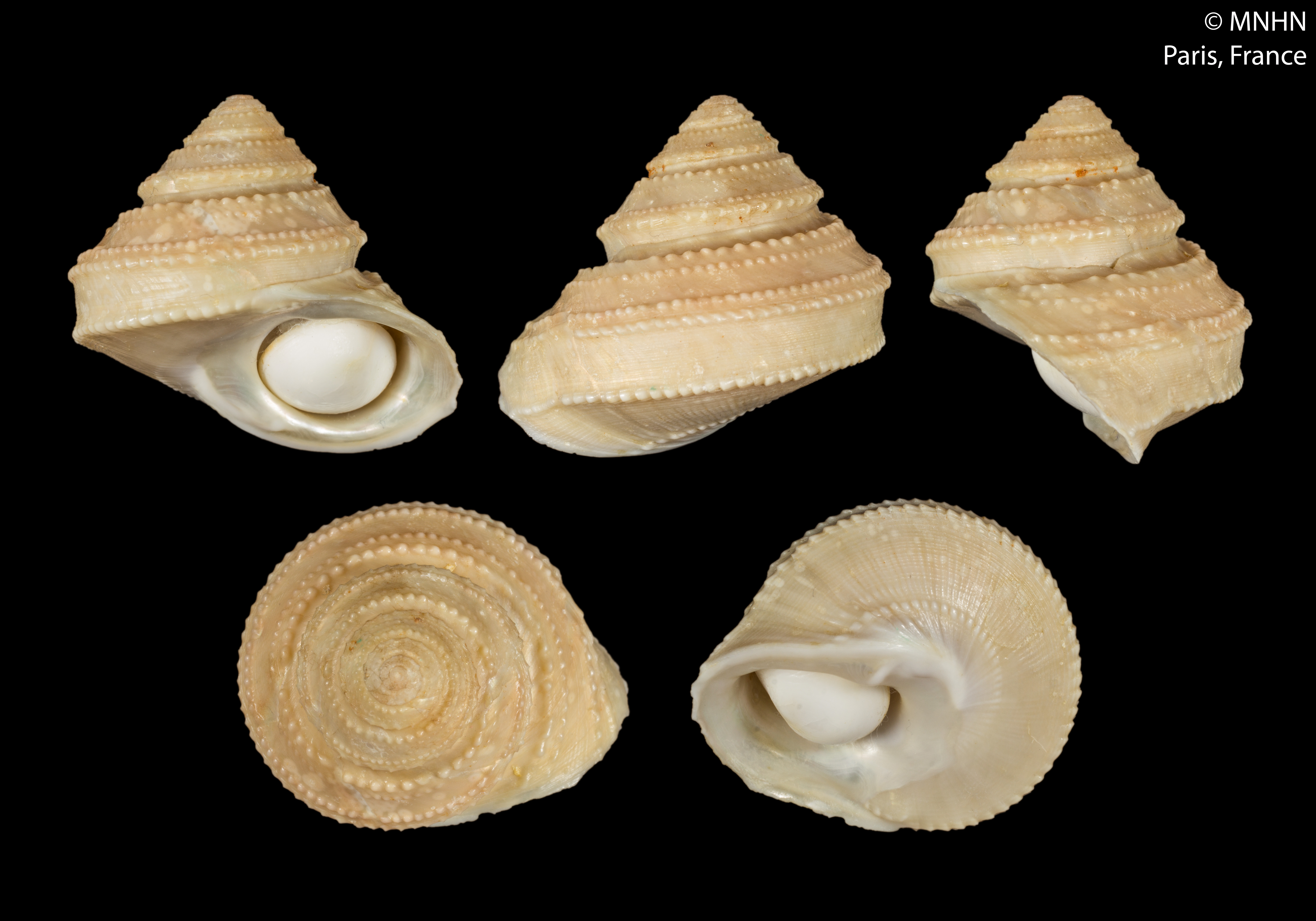
- Shell of Bolma recens (holotype of Bolma recens clemenceae at MNHN, Paris)

Scientific classification
- Kingdom: Animalia
- Phylum: Mollusca
- Class: Gastropoda
- Subclass: Vetigastropoda
- Order: Trochida
- Family: Turbinidae
- Genus: Bolma
- Species: B. recens

Binomial name
- Bolma recens Dell, 1967

Synonyms
- Bolma clemenceae Bozzetti, 2010; Bolma (Bolma) clemenceae Bozzetti, L., 2010; Bolma (Ormastralium) recens (Dell, 1967); Incilaster recens Dell, 1967 (original combination)

= Bolma recens =

Species of gastropod

Bolma recens is a large sea snail with a calcareous operculum, a marine gastropod mollusc in the family Turbinidae, the turban snails.

Subspecies

- Bolma recens clemenceae Bozzetti, 2010
- Bolma recens recens (Dell, 1967)

== Distribution ==
This species is known to occur in deep water on the Kiwi Seamount, north of New Zealand; also off Madagascar.
