= Bolma meynardi =

Scientific classification
- Kingdom: Animalia
- Phylum: Mollusca
- Class: Gastropoda
- Subclass: Vetigastropoda
- Order: Trochida
- Superfamily: Trochoidea
- Family: Turbinidae
- Genus: Bolma
- Species: †B. meynardi

Binomial name
- †Bolma meynardi (Michelotti, 1847)

Synonyms
- Turbo meynardi Michelotti, 1847; Turbo trochleatus Millet, 1854

Extinct species of gastropod

Bolma meynardi is an extinct species of sea snail, a marine gastropod mollusk, in the family Turbinidae, the turban snails.
