= Bolma flindersi =

Scientific classification
- Kingdom: Animalia
- Phylum: Mollusca
- Class: Gastropoda
- Subclass: Vetigastropoda
- Order: Trochida
- Superfamily: Trochoidea
- Family: Turbinidae
- Genus: Bolma
- Species: †B. flindersi

Binomial name
- †Bolma flindersi (Tenison Woods, 1877)

Synonyms
- Astralium (Calcar) flindersi Tenison Woods, 1877; Astralium flindersi Tenison Woods, 1877

Extinct species of gastropod

Bolma flindersi is an extinct species of sea snail, a marine gastropod mollusk, in the family Turbinidae, the turban snails.
