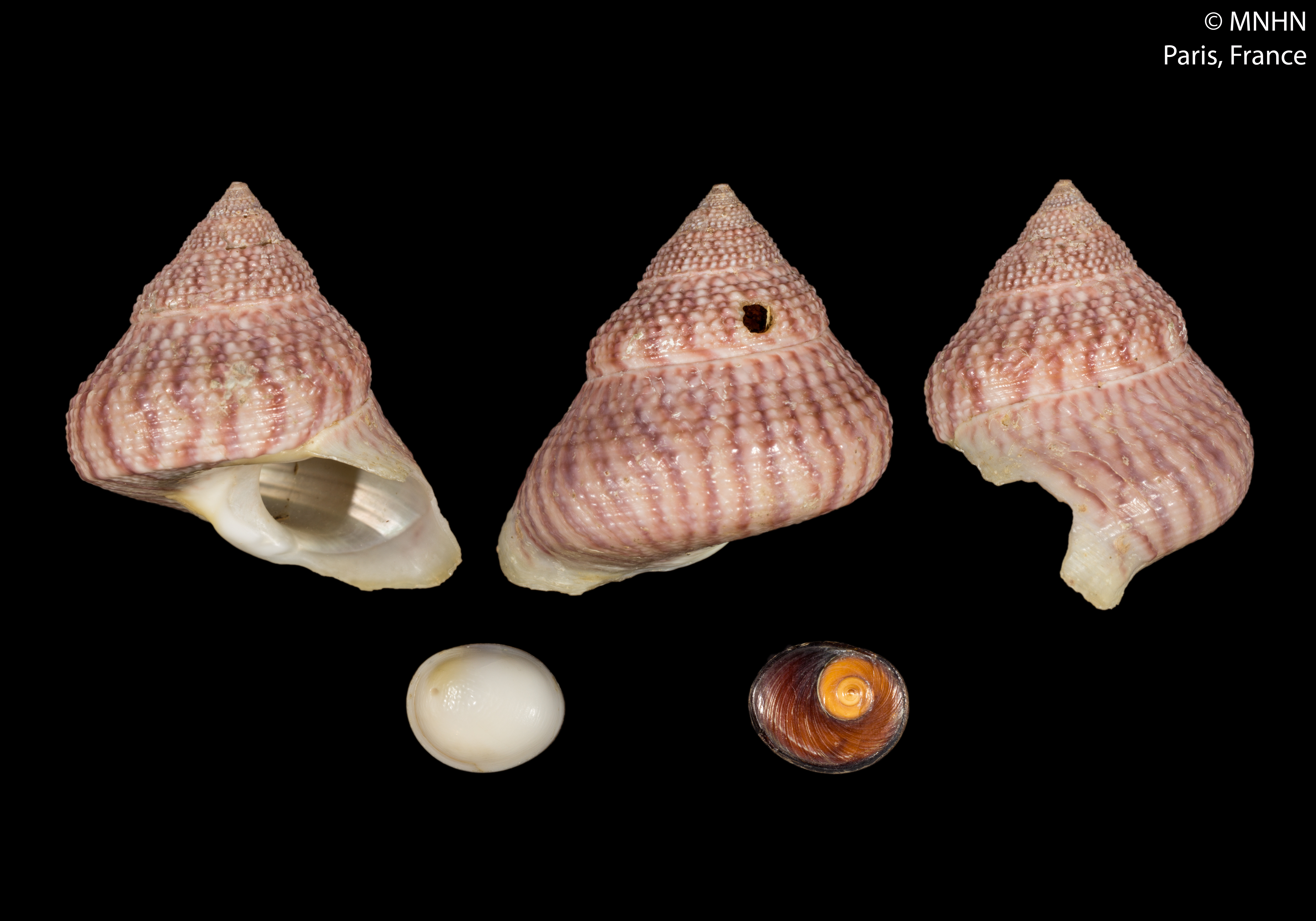
- Shell of Bolma opaoana (holotype at MNHN, Paris)

Scientific classification
- Kingdom: Animalia
- Phylum: Mollusca
- Class: Gastropoda
- Subclass: Vetigastropoda
- Order: Trochida
- Family: Turbinidae
- Genus: Bolma
- Species: B. opaoana

Binomial name
- Bolma opaoana Bouchet & Métivier, 1983

= Bolma opaoana =

Species of gastropod

Bolma opaoana is a species of sea snail, a marine gastropod mollusk in the family Turbinidae, the turban snails.

== Description ==
The size of the shell attains 30 mm.

== Distribution ==
This marine species occurs off New Caledonia.
