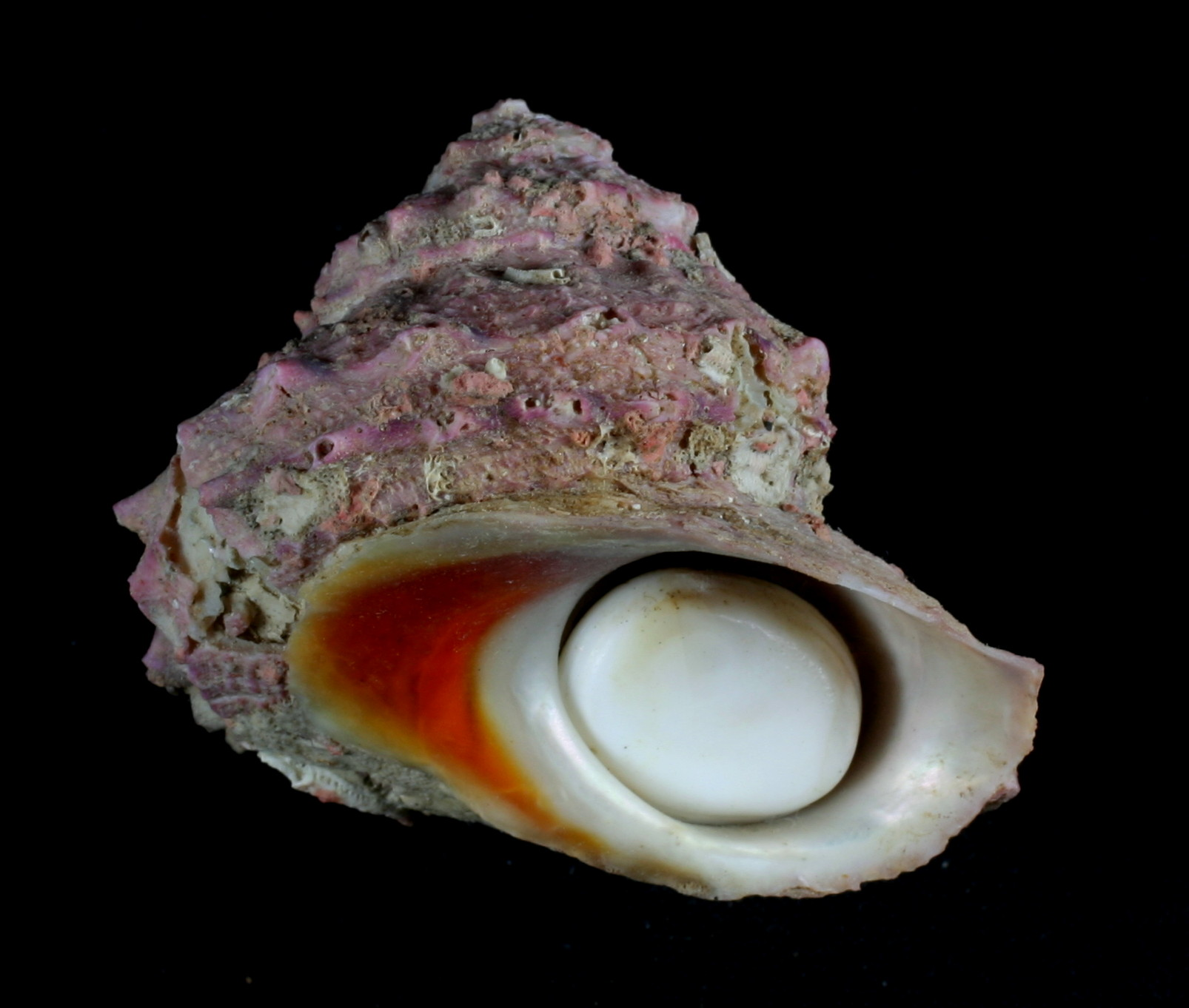
- Shell of Bolma modesta (Reeve, 1843), with operculum measuring 45.6 mm in height by 50.6 mm diameter, taken by tangle nets at 30 m off Point Daio, in Japan.

Scientific classification
- Kingdom: Animalia
- Phylum: Mollusca
- Class: Gastropoda
- Subclass: Vetigastropoda
- Order: Trochida
- Family: Turbinidae
- Genus: Bolma
- Species: B. modesta

Binomial name
- Bolma modesta (Reeve, 1843)

Synonyms
- Astralium (Bolma) modestus var. girgyllus (Reeve, 1843); Trochus modestus Reeve, 1843 (original combination)

= Bolma modesta =

Species of gastropod

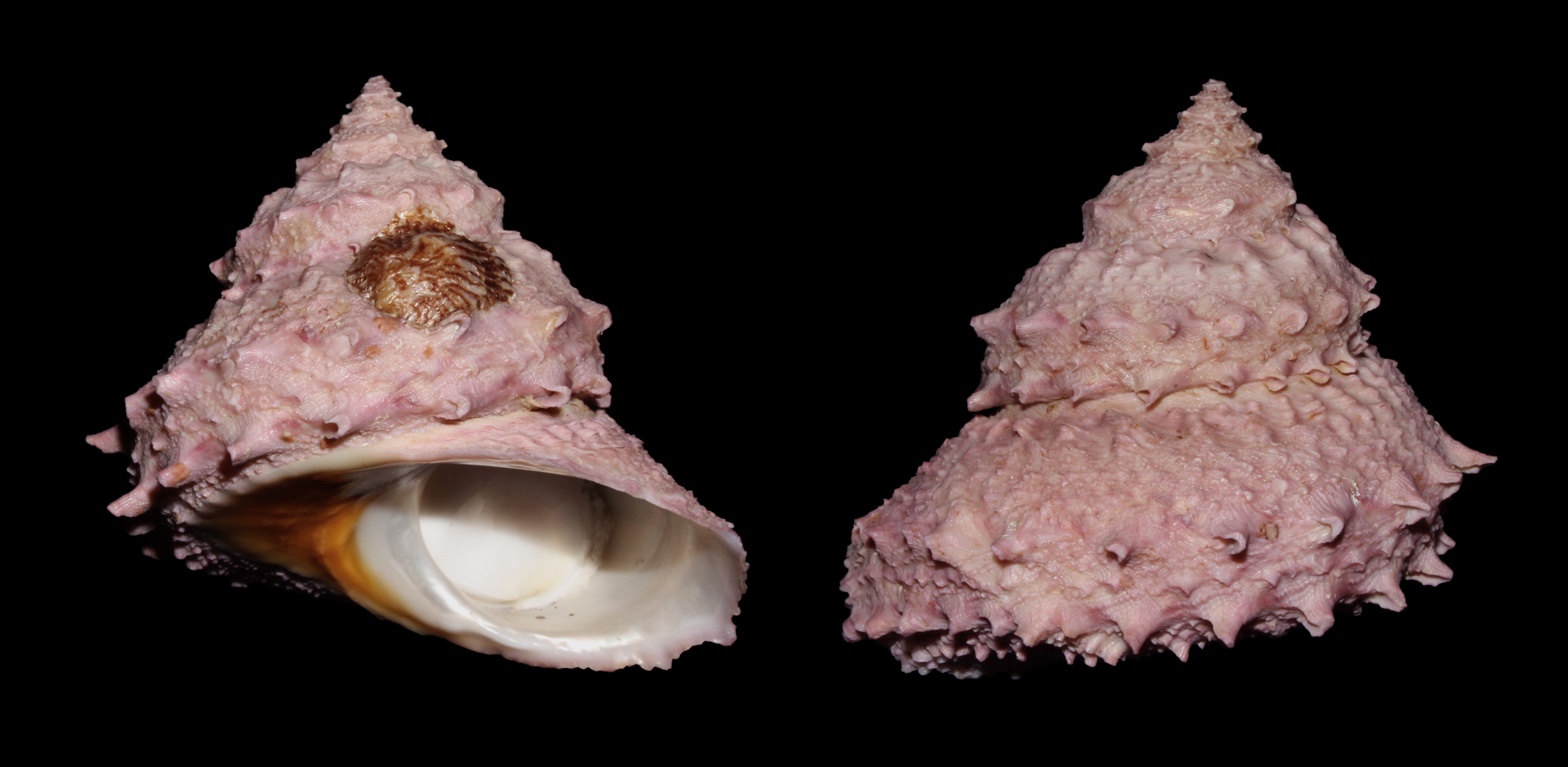
A shell of Bolma modesta, with a Crepidula sp. attached.

Bolma modesta, common name the modest bolma, is a species of sea snail, a marine gastropod mollusk in the family Turbinidae, the turban snails.

== Description ==
The size of the shell varies between 33 mm and 55 mm. The imperforate, orange-rose shell is conically turbinated. The whorls are convexly sloping, then encircled with two rows of scales, papillary grained throughout. The base of the shell is rather flat, tinged with chrome orange.

== Distribution ==
This marine species occurs off Japan, China and Taiwan
