= Bolma midwayensis =

Scientific classification
- Kingdom: Animalia
- Phylum: Mollusca
- Class: Gastropoda
- Subclass: Vetigastropoda
- Order: Trochida
- Family: Turbinidae
- Genus: Bolma
- Species: B. midwayensis

Binomial name
- Bolma midwayensis (Habe & Kosuge, 1970)

Synonyms
- Bolma (Galeoastraea) midwayensis (Habe & Kosuge, 1970); Galeoastraea midwayensis Habe & Kosuge, 1970

Species of gastropod

Bolma midwayensis is a species of sea snail, a marine gastropod mollusk in the family Turbinidae, the turban snails.

== Description ==
The size of the shell varies between 25 mm and 30 mm

== Distribution ==
This species occurs in the Pacific Ocean off Midway Island.
