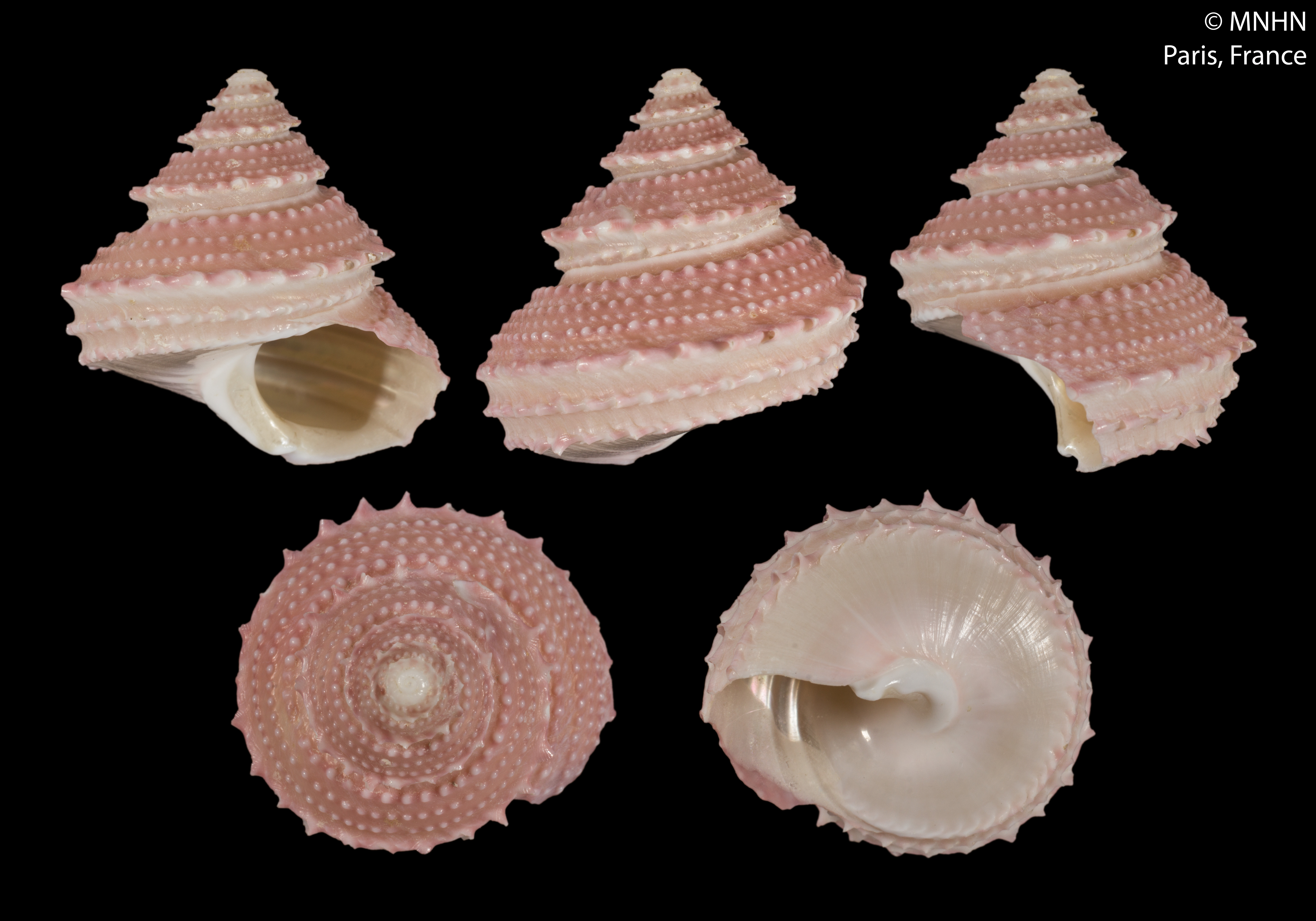
- Shell of Bolma castelinae (holotype at MNHN, Paris)

Scientific classification
- Kingdom: Animalia
- Phylum: Mollusca
- Class: Gastropoda
- Subclass: Vetigastropoda
- Order: Trochida
- Family: Turbinidae
- Genus: Bolma
- Species: B. castelinae

Binomial name
- Bolma castelinae Alf, Maestrati & Bouchet, 2010

= Bolma castelinae =

Species of gastropod

Bolma castelinae is a species of sea snail, a marine gastropod mollusk in the family Turbinidae, the turban snails.

== Description ==
The height of the shell attains 26.5 mm.

== Distribution ==
This marine species occurs off New Caledonia at a depth of 530 m.
