= Bolma granosa =

Scientific classification
- Kingdom: Animalia
- Phylum: Mollusca
- Class: Gastropoda
- Subclass: Vetigastropoda
- Order: Trochida
- Superfamily: Trochoidea
- Family: Turbinidae
- Genus: Bolma
- Species: †B. granosa

Binomial name
- †Bolma granosa (Borson, 1821)

Synonyms
- Bolma miocalcar Peyrot, 1938; Trochus granosus Borson, 1821; Turbo calcar Defrance, 1827

Extinct species of gastropod

Bolma granosa is an extinct species of sea snail, a marine gastropod mollusk, in the family Turbinidae, the turban snails.

== Distribution ==
This species occurs in France.
