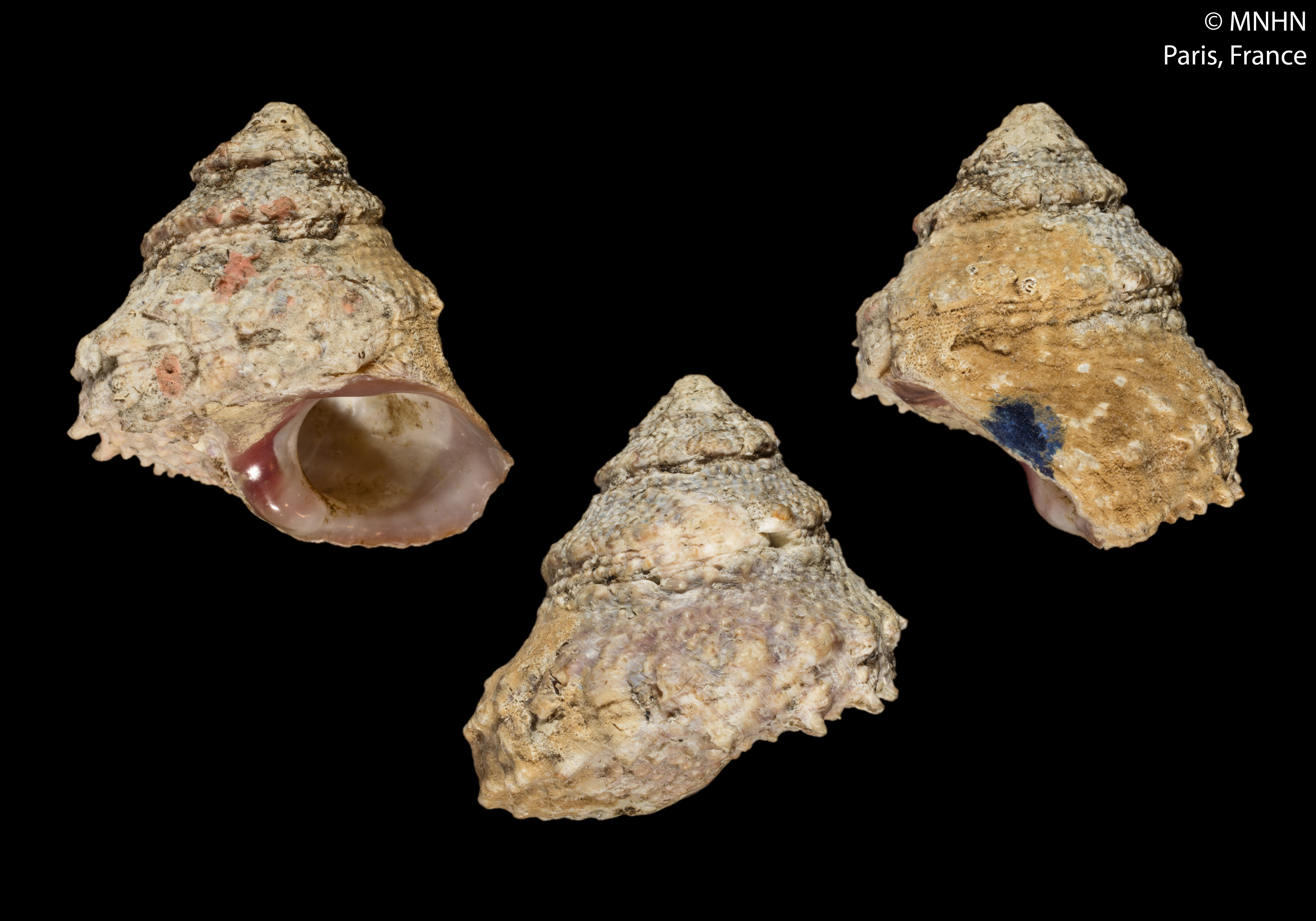
- Shell of Bolma jacquelineae (holotype at MNHN, Paris)

Scientific classification
- Kingdom: Animalia
- Phylum: Mollusca
- Class: Gastropoda
- Subclass: Vetigastropoda
- Order: Trochida
- Family: Turbinidae
- Genus: Bolma
- Species: B. jacquelineae

Binomial name
- Bolma jacquelineae (Marche–Marchad, 1957)

Synonyms
- Bolma christianeae Nolf, 2005

= Bolma jacquelineae =

Species of gastropod

Bolma jacquelineae, previously known as Astraea jacquelineae or Bolma christianeae, is a species of sea snail, a marine gastropod mollusk in the family Turbinidae, the turban snails.

== Description ==
The seashell of this mollusk is very solid, thick, conical, trochoid, imperforate, slightly higher than wide. The apical angle is about 77º. An obtuse whorl descends from the top, composed of 8 whorls. It is flat or slightly concave, and tectiform. The whorls have a slightly spiny keel located behind the abapical suture. The height of the last whorl is equal to about two-thirds of the total height. The following whorls up to and including the fifth have large, slightly oblique nodular folds which become obsolete and disappear after the 5th whorl. The spiral ornamentation is made up of 6 or fewer rows of small, tight, regular granulations. The base, imperforate, is decorated with 5 concentric rows of relatively large tubercles, especially those of the most eccentric row, which take on the appearance of small spines. This species has a depressed - almost flat - protoconch, which is smooth, keeled and formed of two and a half whorls. The entire surface of the base, including the tubercles, is covered with fine, tight radiating striations. The umbilical callus of this species is relatively small and its arched columella is bearing a strong tooth-shaped callus at its base. This mollusk has an oblique aperture and a pearly interior. Its abaxial edge ( labrum) is bevelled.

The first turns of the shell are white, the others are a purplish red leaning towards red wine.

The operculum, which is oval, has a flat internal face, with a subventral nucleus; its external face is rounded and wine-colored.

Dimensions of the shell; length : 31 mm | Width : 30 mm

== Distribution ==
This species is found in the Atlantic Ocean off Sierra Leone, Angola and in the Western Mediterranean Sea.
