= Bolma somaliensis =

Scientific classification
- Kingdom: Animalia
- Phylum: Mollusca
- Class: Gastropoda
- Subclass: Vetigastropoda
- Order: Trochida
- Family: Turbinidae
- Genus: Bolma
- Species: B. somaliensis

Binomial name
- Bolma somaliensis Beu & Ponder, 1979

Species of gastropod

Bolma somaliensis is a species of sea snail, a marine gastropod mollusk in the family Turbinidae, the turban snails.

== Description ==
The height of the pale fawn shell attains 28 mm, its diameter 24 mm. The small, solid shell with very short spines on the body whorl on peripheral angle. The height of moderately tall spire is usually greater than maximum width of shell. There is no trace of a sutural channel. The small basal callus is pale yellow, but turns to white near the columella. The aperture has a white color.

== Distribution ==
This marine species occurs in the Indian Ocean off Somalia.
