= Bolma exotica =

Scientific classification
- Kingdom: Animalia
- Phylum: Mollusca
- Class: Gastropoda
- Subclass: Vetigastropoda
- Order: Trochida
- Family: Turbinidae
- Genus: Bolma
- Species: B. exotica

Binomial name
- Bolma exotica (Okutani, 1969)

Synonyms
- Bolma (Senobolma) exotica (Okutani, 1969); Senobolma exotica Okutani, 1969

Species of gastropod

Bolma exotica is a species of sea snail, a marine gastropod mollusk in the family Turbinidae, the turban snails.

== Description ==
Bolma exotica is a small, very rare deep-water turbinid from Japanese waters.

Scientific name: Bolma exotica

Original combination: Senobolma exotica Okutani

Family: Turbinidae

Phylum: Mollusca

Class: Gastropoda

Common Japanese name: Kawari-kansu (カワリカンス)

Maximum/known shell size: approximately 13 mm for the type specimens; some modern references give 11–15 mm

Locality where found: 26°46.0′ N, 135°22.5′ E

Depth where found: 435 m

Geographic locality: approximately 644 km offshore from Cape Shiono-Misaki, Japan

Habitat: deep water; 435 m is the documented type depth

Diagnostic feature: distinctive rounded gemmae/axial ridges on the spiral cords, especially toward the final whorl.

== Distribution ==
This marine species occurs off the Japan.
