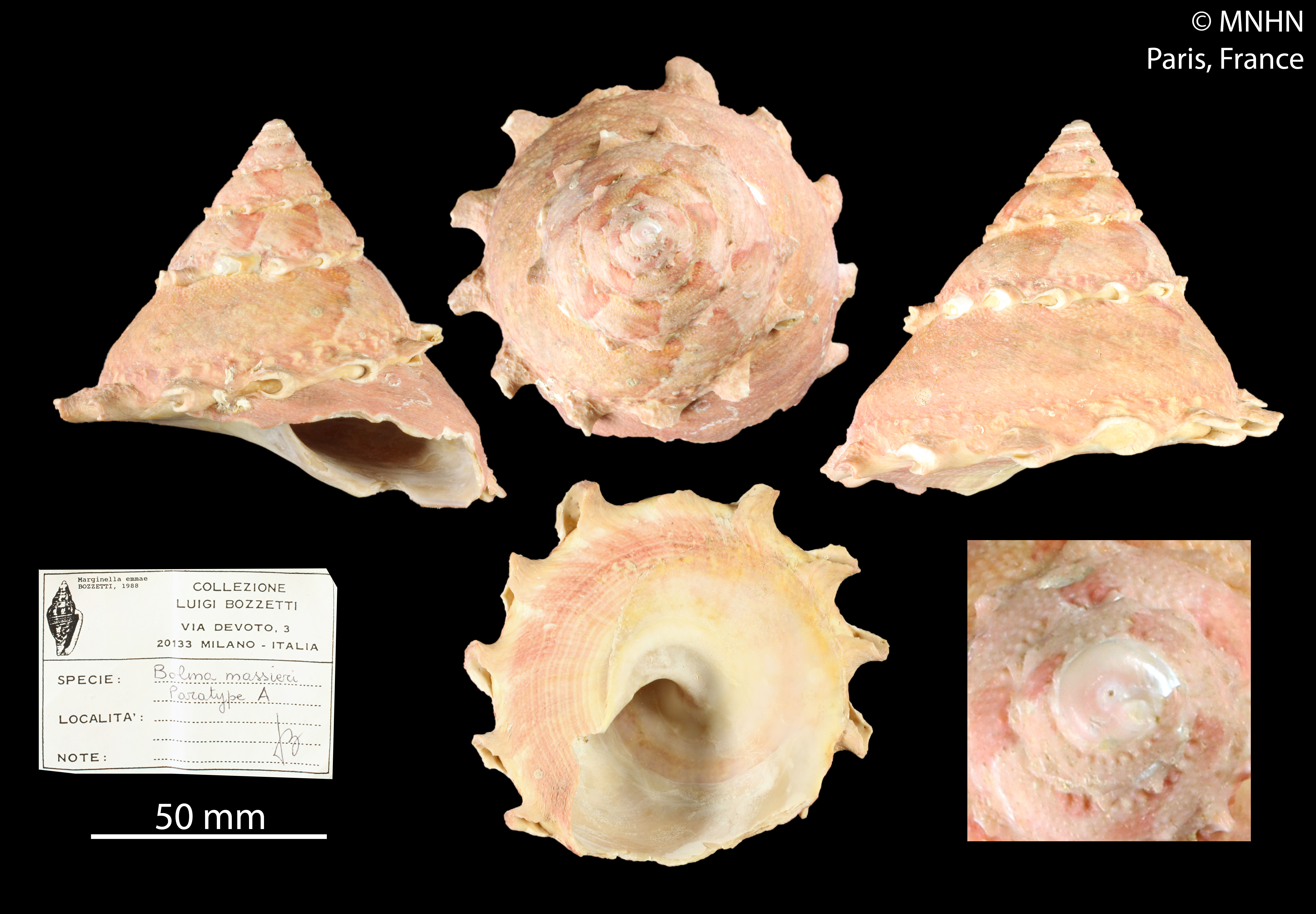
- Shell of Bolma massieri (holotype at MNHN, Paris)

Scientific classification
- Kingdom: Animalia
- Phylum: Mollusca
- Class: Gastropoda
- Subclass: Vetigastropoda
- Order: Trochida
- Family: Turbinidae
- Genus: Bolma
- Species: B. massieri

Binomial name
- Bolma massieri Bozzetti, 1992

Synonyms
- Bolma (Bolma) massieri Bozzetti, 1992

= Bolma massieri =

Species of gastropod

Bolma massieri is a species of sea snail, a marine gastropod mollusk in the family Turbinidae, the turban snails.

== Description ==
The size of the shell attains 90 mm.

== Distribution ==
This marine species is found off South Africa and Mozambique.
