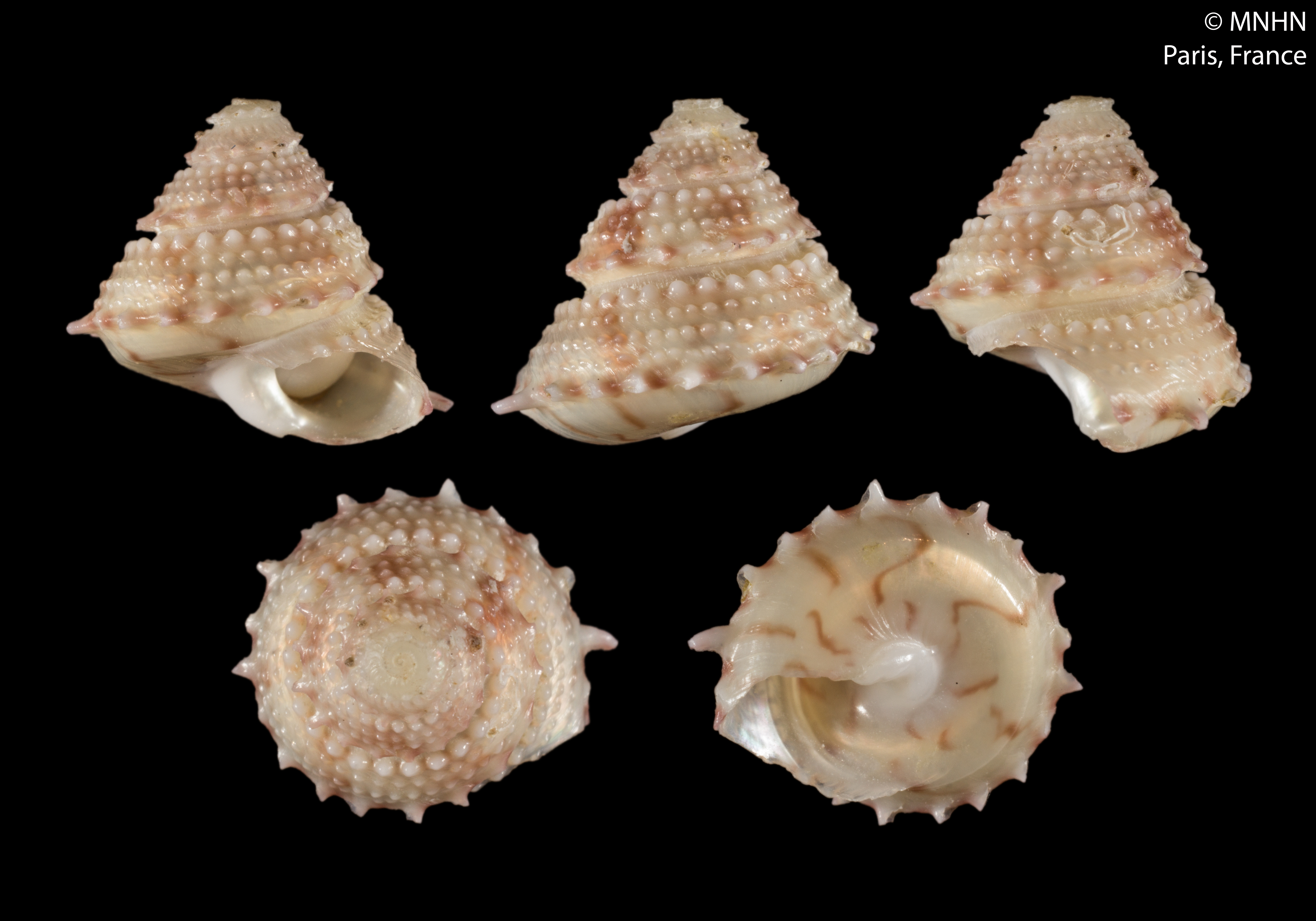
- Shell of Bolma fuscolineata (holotype at MNHN, Paris)

Scientific classification
- Kingdom: Animalia
- Phylum: Mollusca
- Class: Gastropoda
- Subclass: Vetigastropoda
- Order: Trochida
- Family: Turbinidae
- Genus: Bolma
- Species: B. fuscolineata

Binomial name
- Bolma fuscolineata Alf & Kreipl, 2009

= Bolma fuscolineata =

Species of gastropod

Bolma fuscolineata is a species of sea snail, a marine gastropod mollusk in the family Turbinidae, the turban snails.

== Description ==
The height of the shell varies between 7.8 mm and 9.4 mm, its diameter is between 8.9 mm and 9.6 mm.

== Distribution ==
This marine species occurs off French Polynesia and off New Caledonia.
