= Bolma marshalli =

Scientific classification
- Kingdom: Animalia
- Phylum: Mollusca
- Class: Gastropoda
- Subclass: Vetigastropoda
- Order: Trochida
- Superfamily: Trochoidea
- Family: Turbinidae
- Genus: Bolma
- Species: †B. marshalli

Binomial name
- †Bolma marshalli (Thomson, 1908)

Synonyms
- Turbo marshalli Thomson, 1908

Extinct species of gastropod

Bolma marshalli is an extinct species of sea snail, a marine gastropod mollusk, in the family Turbinidae, the turban snails. First described by J.A., Thomson in 1908.

== Distribution ==
This species occurs in New Zealand. The opercula of species of Bolma are oval, circular or intermediate in shape. Almost nothing is known of the biology of species of Bolma although it is assumed that they have at least a short planktonic larval life and probably do not graze on attached algae because most species live well below the limits of algal growth.
