= Bolma kiharai =

Scientific classification
- Kingdom: Animalia
- Phylum: Mollusca
- Class: Gastropoda
- Subclass: Vetigastropoda
- Order: Trochida
- Family: Turbinidae
- Genus: Bolma
- Species: B. kiharai

Binomial name
- Bolma kiharai Kosuge, 1986

Synonyms
- Bolma (Galeoastraea) kiharai Kosuge, 1986; Bolma myrica Okutani, 2001

Species of gastropod

Bolma kiharai is a species of sea snail, a marine gastropod mollusk in the family Turbinidae, the turban snails.

== Description ==
The height of the shell attains 14.5 mm.

== Distribution ==
This marine species occurs off Japan.
