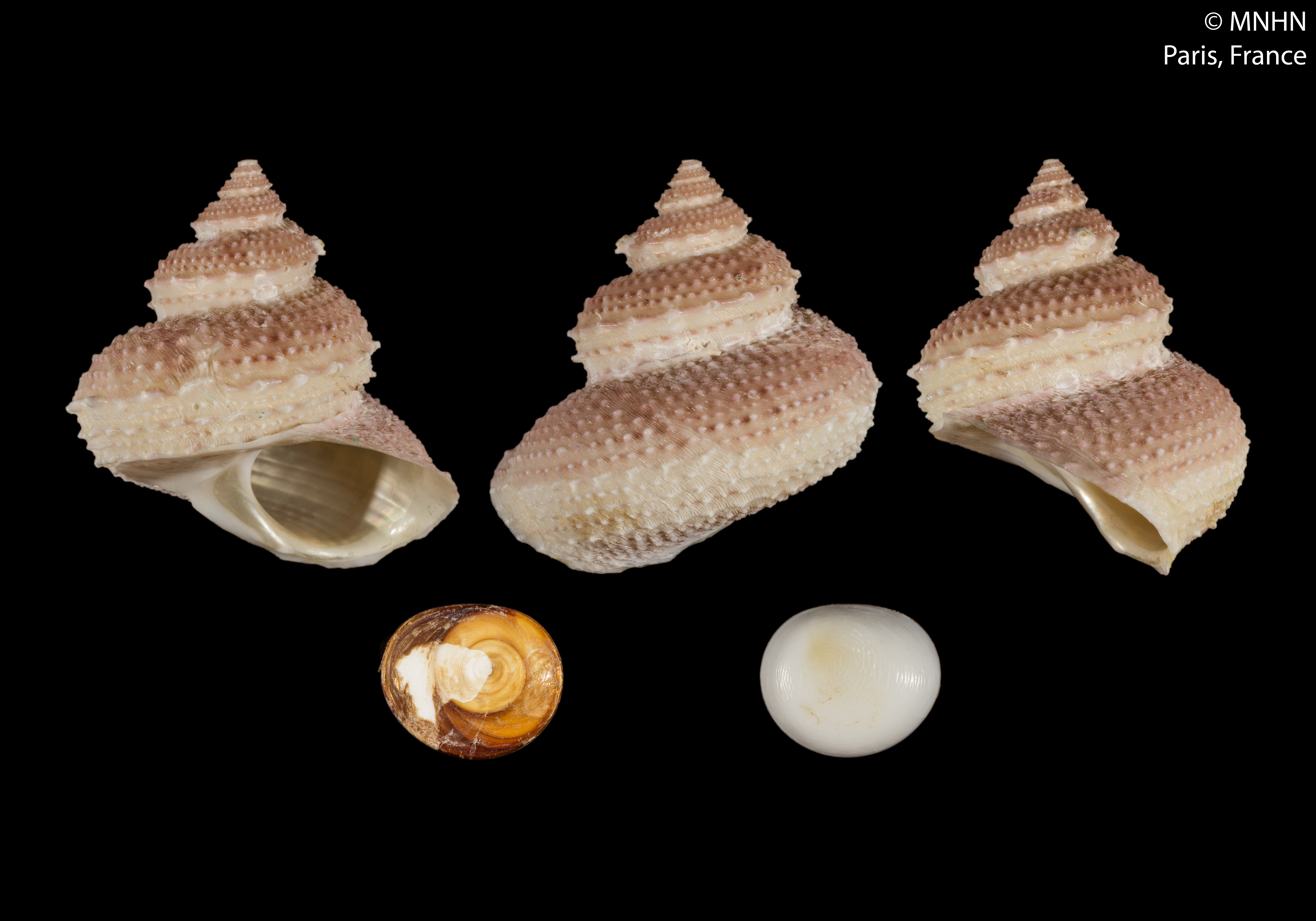
- Shell of Bolma pseudobathyraphis (holotype at MNHN, Paris)

Scientific classification
- Kingdom: Animalia
- Phylum: Mollusca
- Class: Gastropoda
- Subclass: Vetigastropoda
- Order: Trochida
- Family: Turbinidae
- Genus: Bolma
- Species: B. pseudobathyraphis

Binomial name
- Bolma pseudobathyraphis Alf, Maestrati & Bouchet, 2010

= Bolma pseudobathyraphis =

Species of gastropod

Bolma pseudobathyraphis is a species of sea snail, a marine gastropod mollusk in the family Turbinidae, the turban snails.

== Description ==
The size of the shell varies between 28 mm and 42 mm.

== Distribution ==
This marine species was found off the Norfolk Ridge, New Caledonia.
