= Bolma austroconica =

Scientific classification
- Kingdom: Animalia
- Phylum: Mollusca
- Class: Gastropoda
- Subclass: Vetigastropoda
- Order: Trochida
- Superfamily: Trochoidea
- Family: Turbinidae
- Genus: Bolma
- Species: †B. austroconica

Binomial name
- †Bolma austroconica Beu & Ponder, 1979

Extinct species of gastropod

Bolma austroconica is an extinct species of sea snail, a marine gastropod mollusk, in the family Turbinidae, the turban snails.

== Distribution ==
This species occurs in Victoria (Australian state).
