= Bolma flava =

Scientific classification
- Kingdom: Animalia
- Phylum: Mollusca
- Class: Gastropoda
- Subclass: Vetigastropoda
- Order: Trochida
- Family: Turbinidae
- Genus: Bolma
- Species: B. flava

Binomial name
- Bolma flava Beu & Ponder, 1979

Synonyms
- Bolma tamikoana flava Beu & Ponder, 1979; Bolma (Galeoastraea) tamikoana flava Beu, A.G. & W.F. Ponder, 1979

Species of gastropod

Bolma flava is a species of sea snail, a marine gastropod mollusk in the family Turbinidae, the turban snails.

== Distribution ==
This species occurs in the Indian Ocean off Madagascar.
