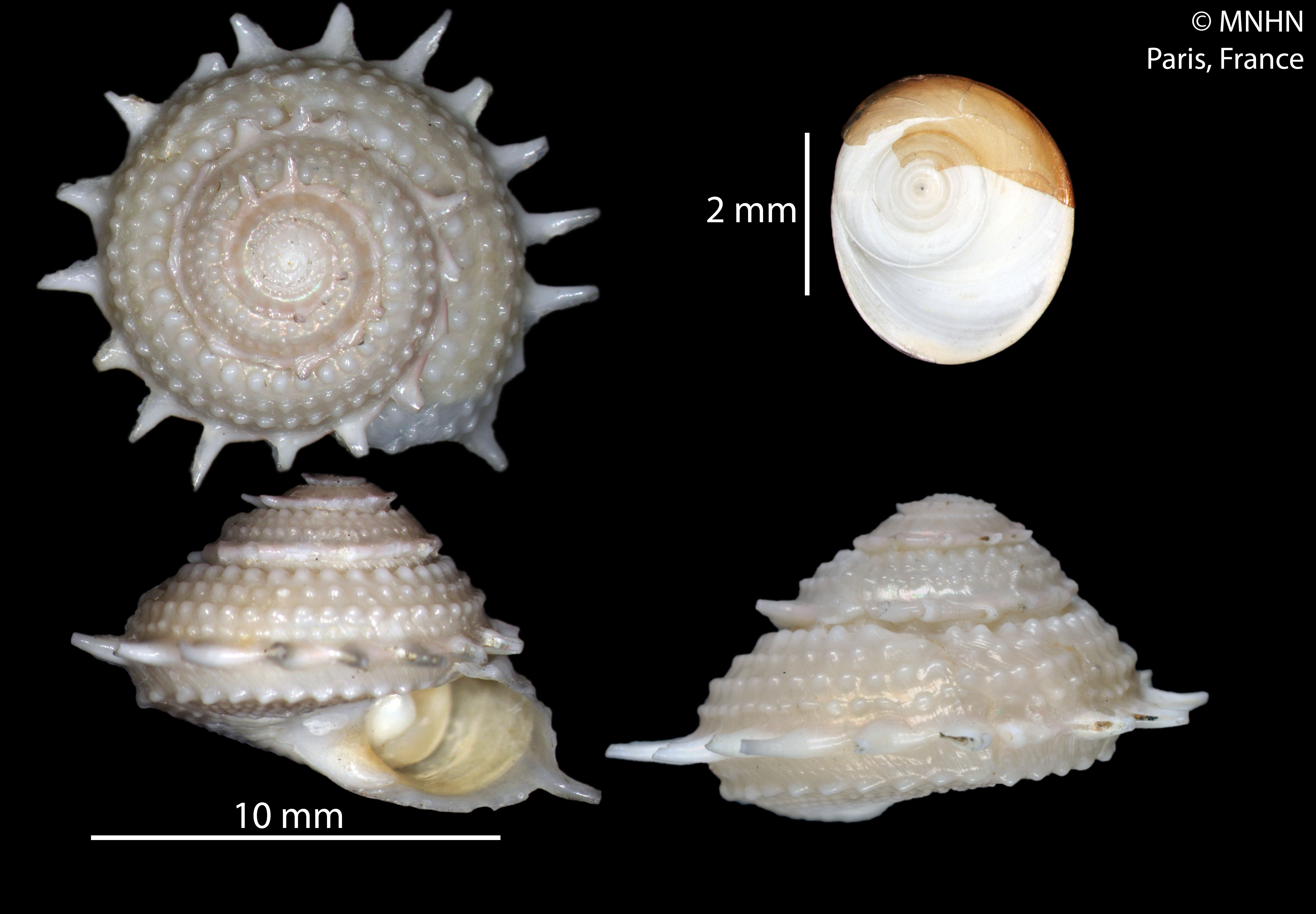
- Shell of Bolma minutiradiosa (paratype at MNHN, Paris)

Scientific classification
- Kingdom: Animalia
- Phylum: Mollusca
- Class: Gastropoda
- Subclass: Vetigastropoda
- Order: Trochida
- Family: Turbinidae
- Genus: Bolma
- Species: B. minutiradiosa

Binomial name
- Bolma minutiradiosa Kosuge, 1983

Synonyms
- Bolma (Bolma) minutiradiosa Kosuge, 1983

= Bolma minutiradiosa =

Species of gastropod

Bolma minutiradiosa is a species of sea snail, a marine gastropod mollusk in the family Turbinidae, the turban snails.

== Description ==
The size of the shell varies between 12 mm and 20 mm.

== Distribution ==
This marine species occurs off the Philippines.
