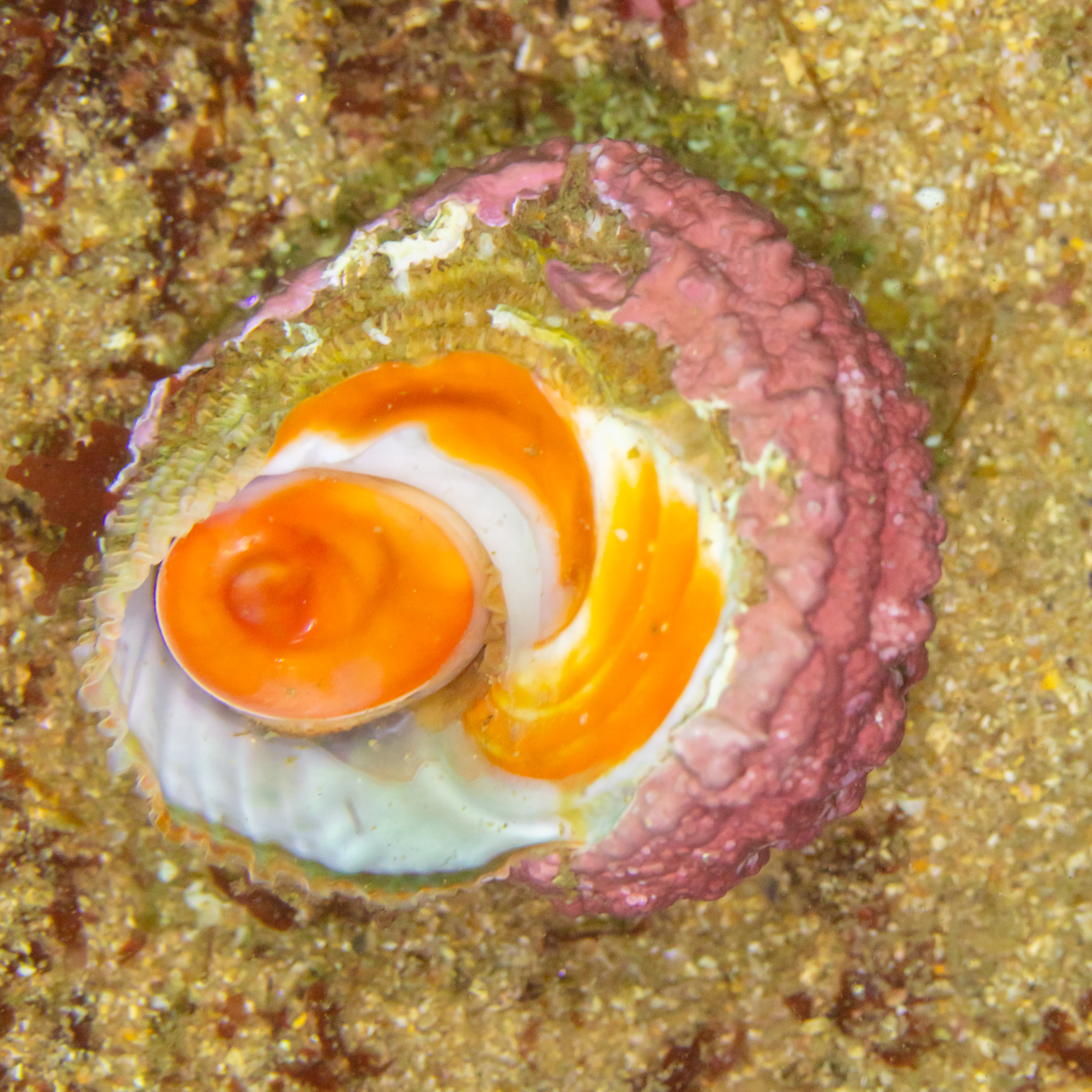
- Exemplar in Sesimbra, Portugal
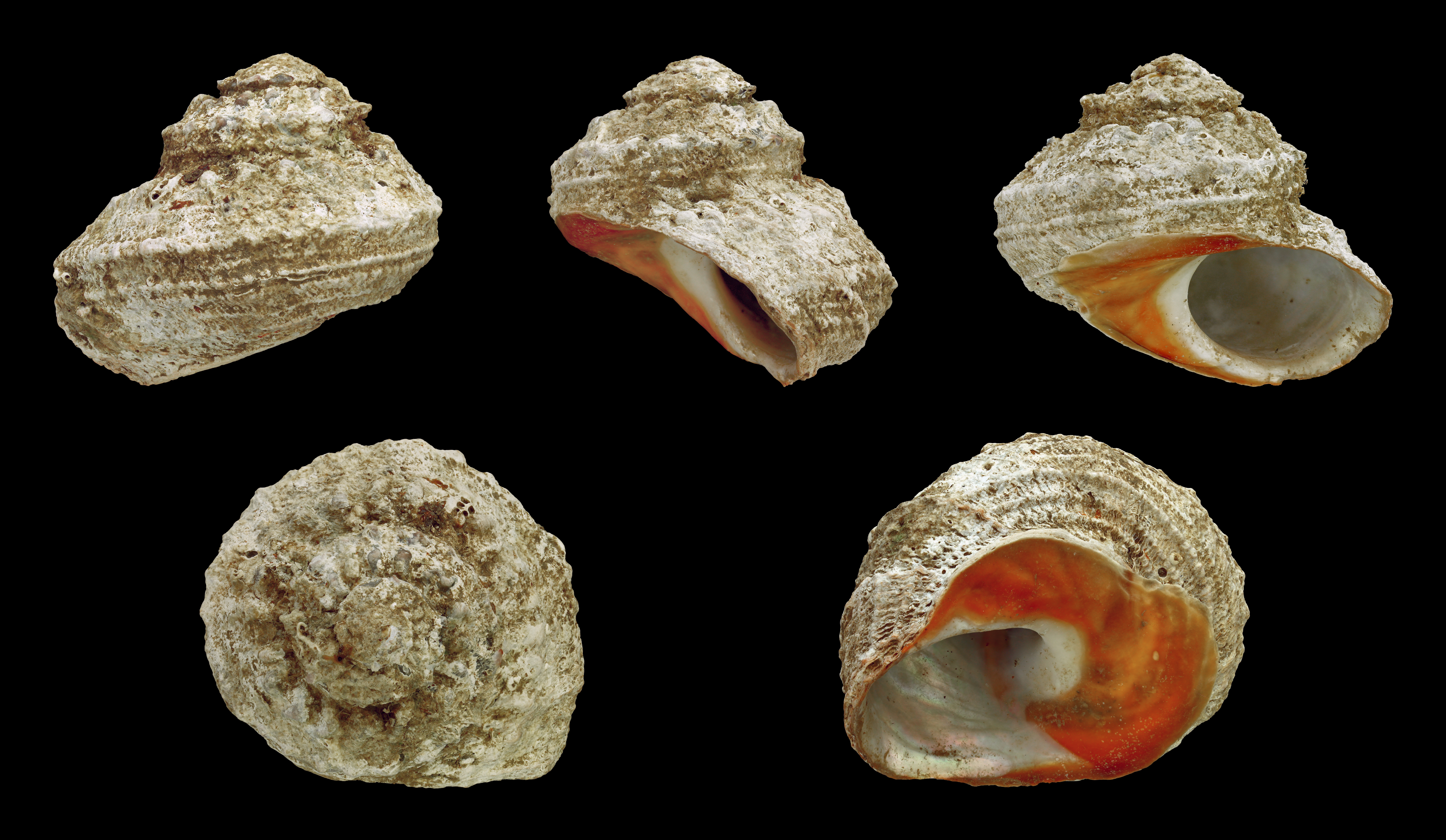
- A shell of Bolma rugosa

Scientific classification
- Kingdom: Animalia
- Phylum: Mollusca
- Class: Gastropoda
- Subclass: Vetigastropoda
- Order: Trochida
- Family: Turbinidae
- Genus: Bolma
- Species: B. rugosa

Binomial name
- Bolma rugosa (Linnaeus, 1767)

Synonyms
- Astraea rugosa (Linnaeus, 1767); Astralium (Bolma) rugosum (Linnaeus, 1767); Solarium calcar O. Costa, 1861; Trochus solaris Brocchi, 1814; Turbo armatus Dillwyn, 1817; Turbo rugosus Linnaeus, 1767 (original combination); Turbo rugosus var. asdiuca de Gregorio, 1885; Turbo rugosus var. asus de Gregorio, 1885; Turbo rugosus var. pera de Gregorio, 1885

= Bolma rugosa =

Species of gastropod

Bolma rugosa is a species of large sea snail in the family Turbinidae, the turban snails. It occurs in the eastern Atlantic Ocean and in the Mediterranean Sea.

== Description ==
The size of the shell varies between 25 mm and 70 mm. The solid, imperforate shell has a conic shape. It is brown or cinereous. The suture is canaliculate, bordered below by a series of curved radiating tubercles. The 6-7 whorls are obliquely lamellose striate. The upper ones are carinate and tuberculate or spinose at the periphery. The body whorl descends rounded or bicarinate and is spirally lirate. The base of the shell is conspicuously radiately striate. The aperture is obliquely, transversely oval, and pearly within. The columella is arched, white and pearly, with an orange callus dilated over the umbilical region and extending over the parietal wall. The operculum is short-oval, brown within, with four whorls, the nucleus situated one-third the distance across the face. Outside, it is bright orange, polished, with a spiral callous ridge.

== Distribution ==
This species occurs in the Atlantic Ocean off Portugal, Western Sahara, the Canary Islands, Cape Verdes, Madeira, the Azores; in the Mediterranean Sea (off Greece, Sicily and the north of Catalonia).
