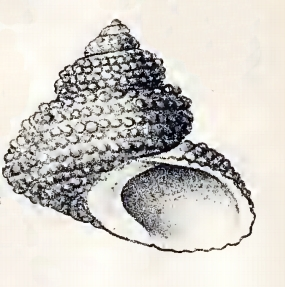
- Drawing of a shell of Bolma guttata

Scientific classification
- Kingdom: Animalia
- Phylum: Mollusca
- Class: Gastropoda
- Subclass: Vetigastropoda
- Order: Trochida
- Family: Turbinidae
- Genus: Bolma
- Species: B. guttata

Binomial name
- Bolma guttata (A. Adams, 1863)

Synonyms
- Bolma guttata guttata (A. Adams, 1863); Modelia guttata A. Adams, 1863; Turbo amabilis Ozaki, 1954; Turbo guttata (A. Adams, 1863)

= Bolma guttata =

Species of gastropod

Bolma guttata, common name the sandpaper bolma, is a species of sea snail, a marine gastropod mollusk in the family Turbinidae, the turban snails.

== Description ==
The size of the shell varies between 35 mm and 45 mm. The turbinate-conic shell has an umbilicus covered by callus. The spire is elevated. Its color pattern is flesh-colored, gold-tinted, and punctate with reddish. The deep sutures are canaliculate. The convex whorls are cingulate with rows of bead-like separated granules. The interstices are longitudinally obliquely striate. At the suture they are ornamented with a series of squamiform tubercles. The circular aperture is sulcate within, a thin wide callus covering the umbilicus.

== Distribution ==
This marine species occurs off Japan, the Philippines and Queensland, Australia.
