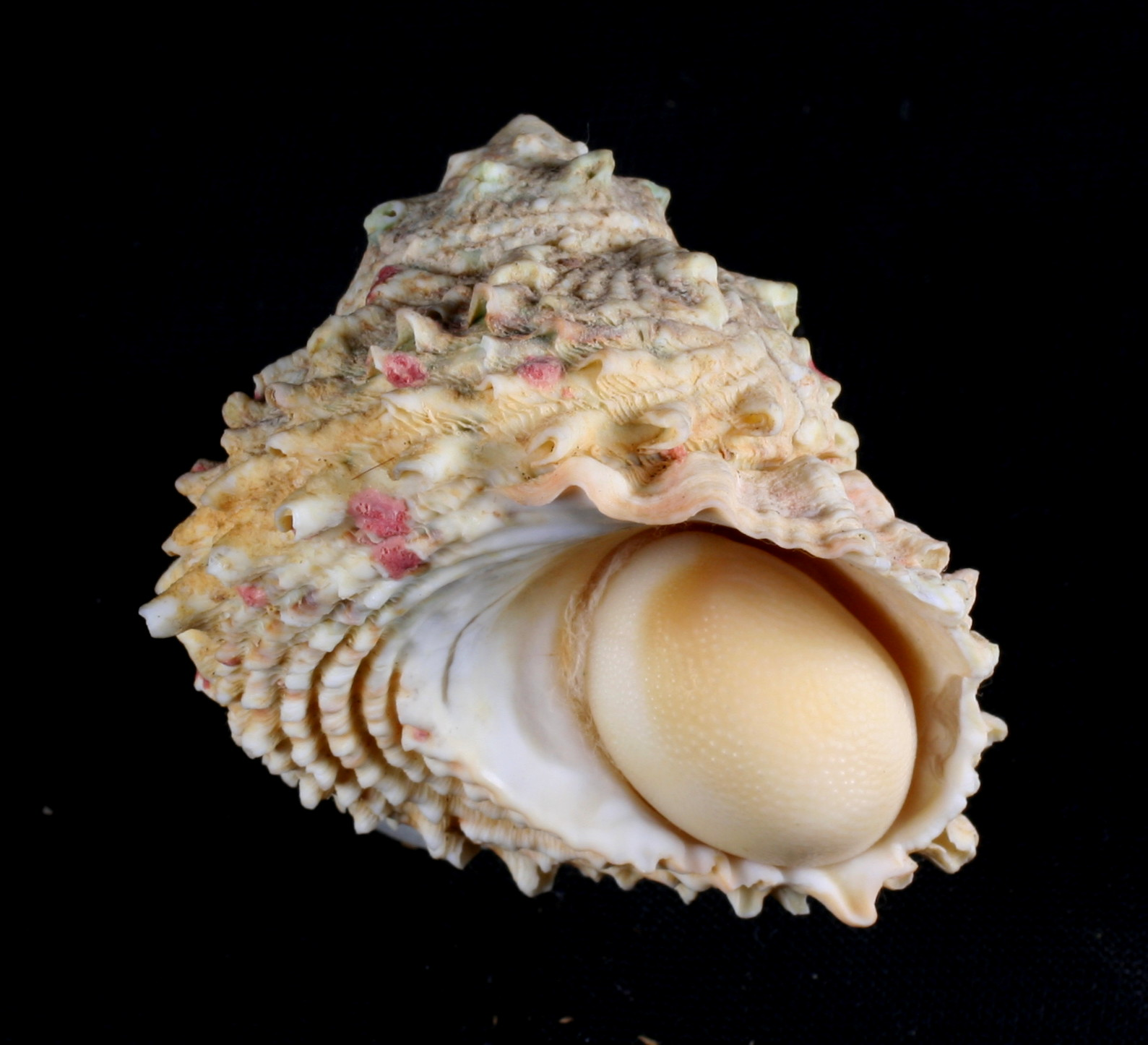
- Shell of Lithopoma caelatum (Gmelin, 1791), with operculum, measuring 51.9 mm in height by 51.2 mm diameter, found on reefs off Fajardo, in Puerto Rico.

Scientific classification
- Domain: Eukaryota
- Kingdom: Animalia
- Phylum: Mollusca
- Class: Gastropoda
- Subclass: Vetigastropoda
- Order: Trochida
- Superfamily: Trochoidea
- Family: Turbinidae
- Genus: Lithopoma; Gray, 1850

Type species
- Trochus tuber Linnaeus, 1758

Synonyms
- Astraea (Pachypoma) Gray, 1850; Pachypoma Gray, 1850

= Lithopoma =

Genus of gastropods

Lithopoma is a genus of medium-sized to large sea snails with a calcareous operculum, marine gastropod mollusks in the subfamily Turbininae of the family Turbinidae, the turban snails.

== Description ==
The elevated, imperforate shell has a turbinate or trochiform shape. with a plicate spire that is flat or concave below. Its periphery is carinated or rounded. The base of the shell is somewhat convex. The whorls above are radiately plicate. The operculum is oval, outside coarsely granulose, and either simply convex or with a curved spiral rib with its terminations connected by a straight one. The nucleus is submarginal.

== Distribution ==
This genus occurs in the Caribbean Sea, the Gulf of Mexico and off the Lesser Antilles.

== Species ==
Species within this genus were previously placed in the genus Astraea. They include:

- Lithopoma americanum (Gmelin, 1791)
- Lithopoma brevispina (Lamarck, 1822)
- Lithopoma caelatum (Gmelin, 1791)
- Lithopoma phoebium (Röding, 1798)
- Lithopoma tectum (Lightfoot, 1786)
- Lithopoma tuber (Linnaeus, 1758)

Species brought into synonymy

- Lithopoma gibberosa (Dillwyn, 1817) : synonym of Pomaulax gibberosus (Dillwyn, 1817)
- Lithopoma gibberosum (Dillwyn, 1817): synonym of Pomaulax gibberosus (Dillwyn, 1817)
- Lithopoma heliotropium (Martyn, T., 1784): synonym of Astraea heliotropium (Martyn, 1784)
- Lithopoma imbricatum Gmelin, J.F., 1791: synonym of Lithopoma tectum (Lightfoot, 1786)
- Lithopoma phoebium longispina Lamarck, J.B.P.A. de, 1822: synonym of Lithopoma phoebium (Röding, 1798)
- Lithopoma tectum americanum (Gmelin, 1791): synonym of Lithopoma americanum (Gmelin, 1791)
- Lithopoma tuber venezuelensis Flores, C. & Cáceres de Talarico, 1980: synonym of Lithopoma tuber (Linnaeus, 1758)
- Lithopoma undosum (W. Wood, 1828): synonym of Megastraea undosa (W. Wood, 1828)
