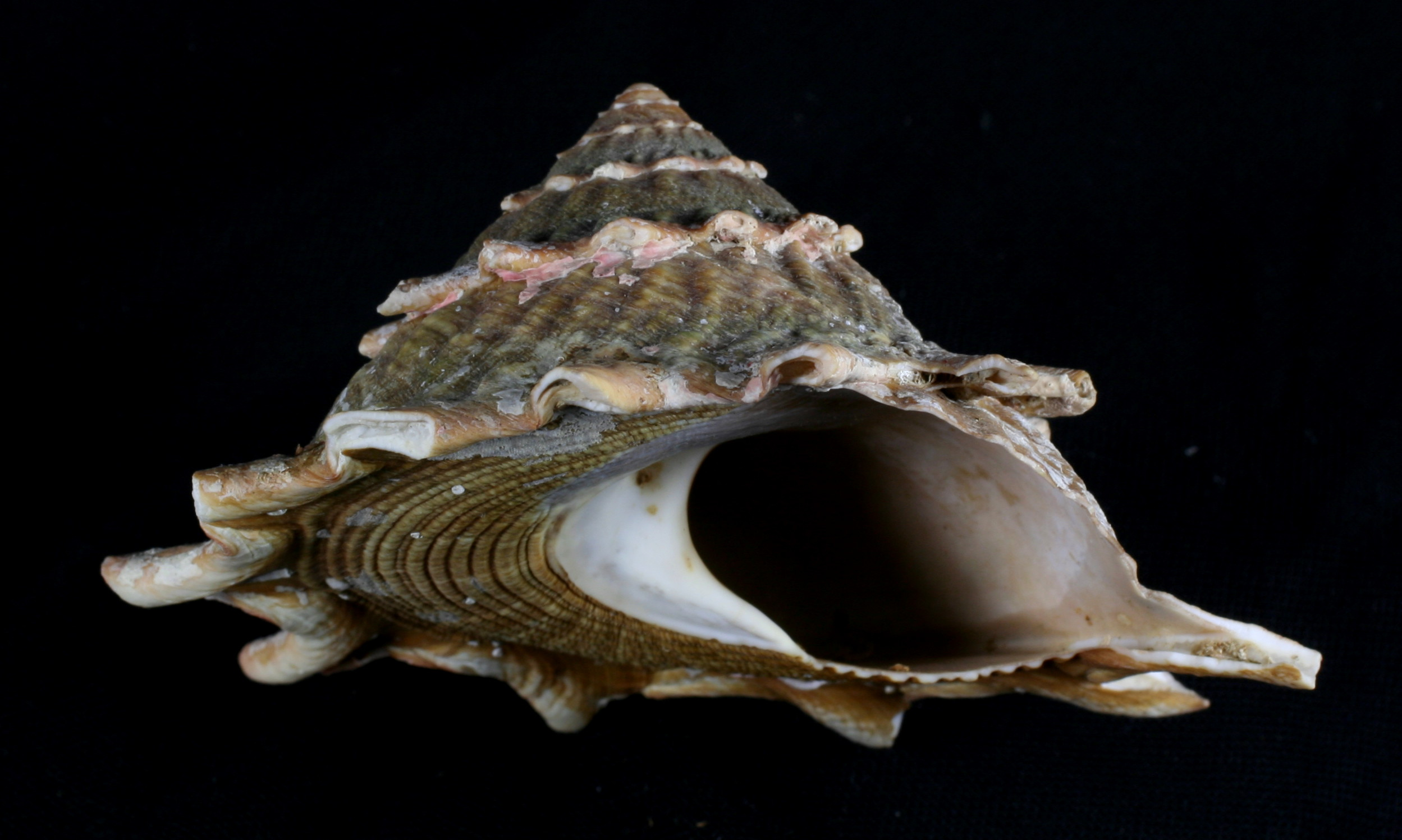
- Shell of Pomaulax japonicus (Dunker, 1844), measuring 47.7 mm in height by 74.8 mm diameter, collected with tangle nets at 20 m depth off Pt. Daio, Shima-cho, in Japan

Scientific classification
- Kingdom: Animalia
- Phylum: Mollusca
- Class: Gastropoda
- Subclass: Vetigastropoda
- Order: Trochida
- Superfamily: Trochoidea
- Family: Turbinidae
- Genus: Pomaulax; Gray, 1850

Type species
- Trochus japonicus Dunker, 1845

Species
- See text

= Pomaulax =

Genus of sea snails

Pomaulax is a genus of sea snails, marine gastropod mollusks in the family Turbinidae, the turban snails.

== Description ==
The large, solid, imperforate shell has a conic shape. The periphery is carinated. The base of the shell is flattened. The umbilical tract shows a strong curved rib. The operculum is obovate, narrower toward the proximal extremity. Its nucleus is terminal, its outside with four strong granulose ribs radiating from the nucleus.

== Species ==
Species within the genus Pomaulax include:

- Pomaulax gibberosus (Dillwyn, 1817)
- Pomaulax japonicus (Dunker, 1844)
- Pomaulax spiratus (Dall, 1911)

Species brought into synonymy

- Pomaulax turbanicus Dall, 1910: synonym of Megastraea turbanica (Dall, 1910)
- Pomaulax undosum Wood, 1828: synonym of Megastraea undosa (Wood, 1828)
