= Red turban =

Red turban may refer to:

- Pomaulax gibberosus, a species of sea snail
- Red Turban Rebellions (1351–1368), a massive rebellion in China against the Mongol Yuan dynasty, later also spread into Korea
- Red Turban Rebellion (1854–1856), a short-lived rebellion in South China against the Manchu Qing dynasty

== See also ==
- Portrait of a Man (Self Portrait?), also known as the Portrait of a Man in a Red Turban, a 1433 oil painting by Jan van Eyck
