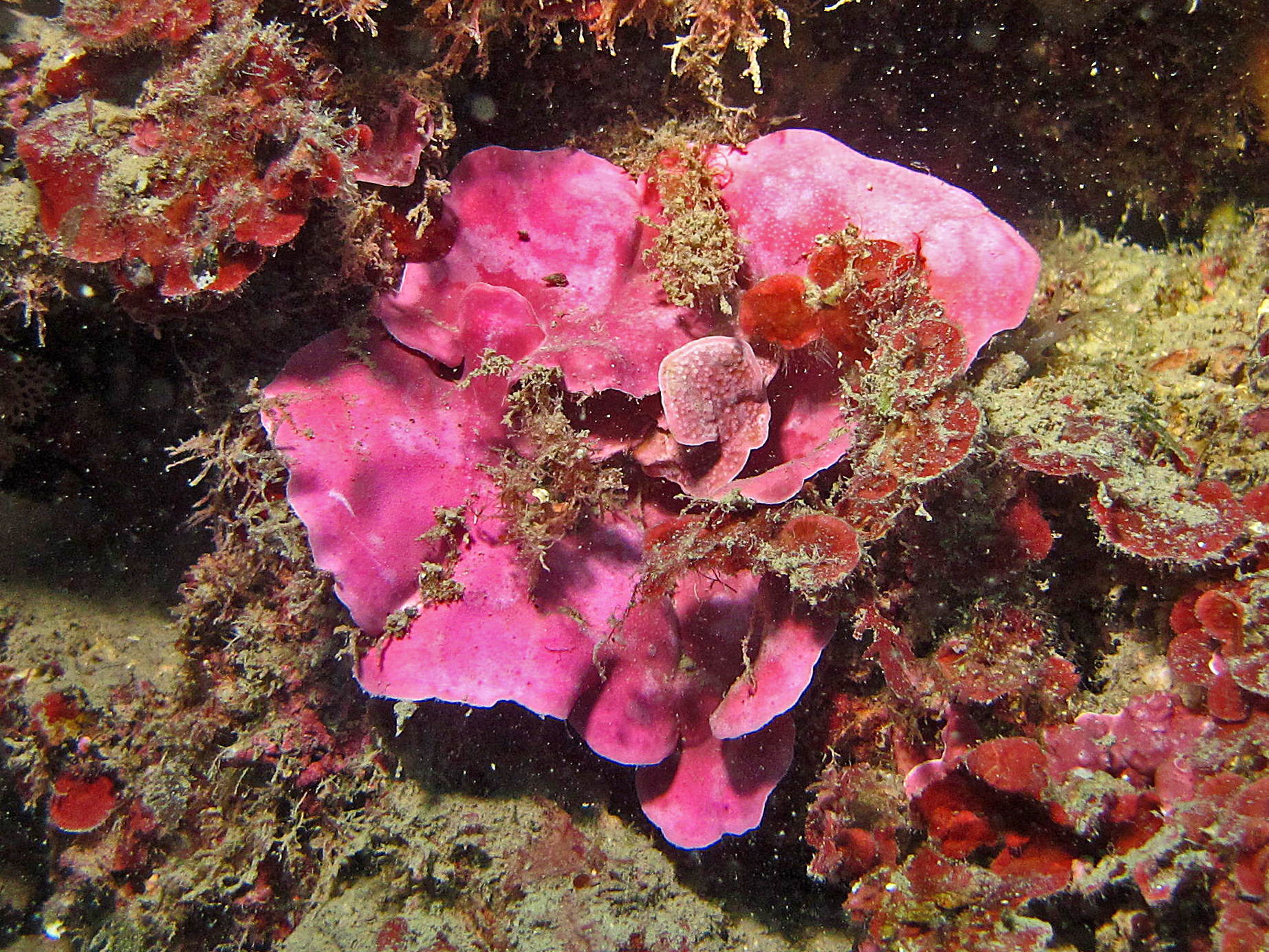
- Mesophyllum expansum

Scientific classification
- Domain: Eukaryota
- Clade: Archaeplastida
- Division: Rhodophyta
- Class: Florideophyceae
- Order: Corallinales
- Family: Hapalidiaceae
- Subfamily: Melobesioideae
- Genus: Mesophyllum; Me. Lemoine, 1928

= Mesophyllum =

Genus of algae

Mesophyllum is a genus of red alga belonging to the family Hapalidiaceae.

== Species ==
- Mesophyllum aemulans (Foslie & M.A. Howe) Adey
- Mesophyllum aleuticum Lebednik, 2004
- Mesophyllum alternans (Foslie) Cabioch & Mendoza, 1998
- Mesophyllum brachycladum (Foslie) Adey, 1970
- Mesophyllum canariense (Foslie) M. Lemoine, 1928
- Mesophyllum caraiensis (Foslie) M. Lemoine
- Mesophyllum commune M. Lemoine, 1939
- Mesophyllum conchatum (Setchell & Foslie) Adey, 1970
- Mesophyllum crassiusculum (Foslie) P. A. Lebednik, 2004
- Mesophyllum crispescens (Foslie) M. Lemoine, 1954
- Mesophyllum curtum M. Lemoine, 1939
- Mesophyllum cystocarpideum (Foslie) Adey 1970
- Mesophyllum ectocarpon (Foslie) Adey
- Mesophyllum ehrmannii M. Lemoine, 1939
- Mesophyllum engelhartii (Foslie) Adey, 1970
- Mesophyllum erubescens (Foslie) M. Lemoine, 1928
- Mesophyllum exasperatum (Foslie) Adey, 1970
- Mesophyllum expansum (Philippi) Cabioch & Mendoza, 2003
- Mesophyllum floridanum (Foslie) W.H. Adey ex M.J. Wynne, 1986
- Mesophyllum funafutiense (Foslie) Verheij, 1993
- Mesophyllum imbricatum (Dickie) Adey, 1970
- Mesophyllum incertum (Foslie) Me. Lemoine, 1928
- Mesophyllum incisum (Foslie) Adey, 1970
- Mesophyllum inconspicuum (Foslie) Adey, 1970
- Mesophyllum koritzae M. Lemoine, 1939
- Mesophyllum lamellatum (Setchell & Foslie) W.H. Adey, 1970
- Mesophyllum laxum M. Lemoine, 1929
- Mesophyllum lichenoides (J. Ellis) Marie Lemoine, 1928
- Mesophyllum macedonis Athanasiadis, 1999
- Mesophyllum macroblastum (Foslie) Adey, 1970
- Mesophyllum megagastri Athanasiadis, 2007
- Mesophyllum mesomorphum (Foslie) Adey, 1970
- Mesophyllum nitidum (Foslie) Adey, 1970
- Mesophyllum ornatum (Foslie & M.A. Howe) Athanasiadis, 1999
- Mesophyllum printzianum Woelkerling & A.S. Harvey, 1993
- Mesophyllum pulchrum (Weber-van Bosse & Foslie) Lemoine, 1928
- Mesophyllum sancti-dionysii M. Lemoine, 1939
- Mesophyllum schenckii Howe, 1934
- Mesophyllum siamense (Foslie) Adey, 1970
- Mesophyllum simulans (Foslie) M. Lemoine, 1928
- Mesophyllum stenopon Athanasiadis, 2007
- Mesophyllum superpositum (Foslie) Adey, 1970
- Mesophyllum syntrophicum (Foslie) W.H. Adey, 1970
- Mesophyllum syrphetodes Adey, Townsend & Boykins, 1982
- Mesophyllum tenue (Kjellman) Lebednik, 1975
- Mesophyllum vancouveriense (Foslie) R.S. Steneck & R.T. Paine, 1986

== Bibliography ==
- Lemoine, M. (1928). Un nouveau genre de Mélobésiées: Mesophyllum. Bulletin de la Société Botanique de France 75: 251–254.
- Hamel, G. & Lemoine, P. (1953). Corallinacées de France et d'Afrique du Nord. Archs Mus. nat. Hist. nat. Paris VII Ser. 7, 1: 15–136.
- Patterson, D. (2001). Platypus checklist of Protoctista.
