= Lithopoma americanum =

Conservation status
- Apparently Secure (NatureServe)

Scientific classification
- Kingdom: Animalia
- Phylum: Mollusca
- Class: Gastropoda
- Subclass: Vetigastropoda
- Order: Trochida
- Family: Turbinidae
- Genus: Lithopoma
- Species: L. americanum

Binomial name
- Lithopoma americanum (Gmelin, 1791)

Synonyms
- Astraea americana (Gmelin, 1791); Astraea olfersii (Philippi, 1846); † Astraea (Lithopoma) americana southbayensis Petuch, 1994; Astralium (Lithopoma) americanum (Gmelin, 1791); Imperator americanum (Gmelin, 1791); Lithopoma tectum americanum (Gmelin, 1791); Pachypoma americanum (Gmelin, 1791); Trochus americanus Gmelin, 1791 (original combination); Trochus anilis Röding, 1798

Species of gastropod

Lithopoma americanum is a species of sea snail, a marine gastropod mollusk in the family Turbinidae, the turban snails.

== Distribution ==
This marine snail occurs in the Caribbean Sea, the Gulf of Mexico and off the Lesser Antilles.

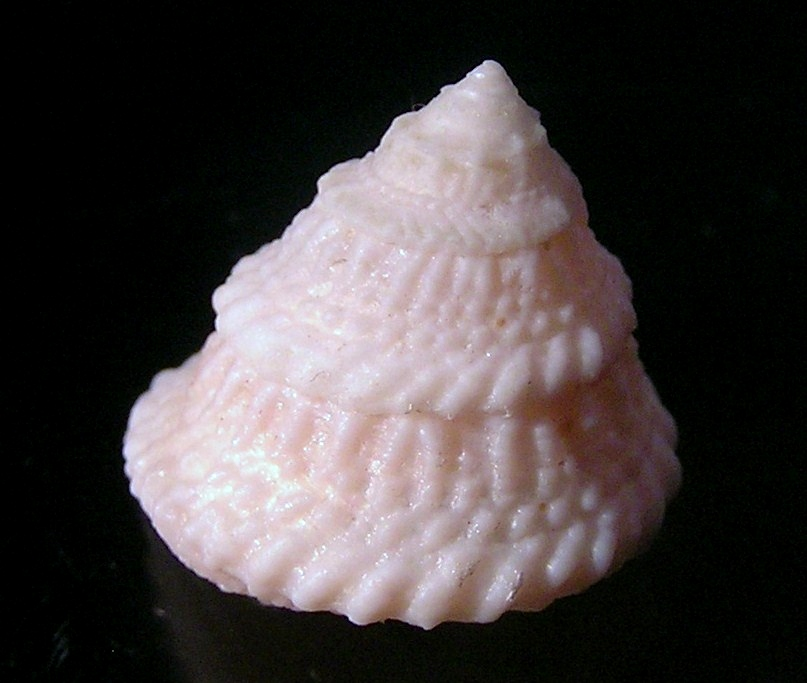
View from top

== Description ==
The maximum recorded shell length is 40 mm (1.6 in).

The elevated, imperforate, solid shell has a trochiform shape. Its color pattern is white or yellowish. The shell contains seven whorls. The upper three whorls are smooth in adults by erosion of the sculpture, flattened or concave on their upper surfaces, longitudinally obliquely plicate. The folds number about thirty-six on the body whorl and terminate on the periphery in nodules (or spines in the young,) generally intersected about the middle by two to four spiral impressed lines. The periphery is angled, more or less swollen. The base of the shell is nearly flat, more or less sharply radiately striate, and spirally lirate. The frequently nodulose lirae number about six, or sometimes more. The aperture is very oblique. The outer lip is usually crenulated. The short columella is heavy, bituberculate at its base, and bounded by a radiately plicate cordon.

The operculum is oval, light brown within, with a sublateral nucleus. Its outside is convex, white, granulose, more or less excavated around the upper margin, excavated near the center. Young specimens show a stout curved central rib following the spiral, its ends connected by a short straight rib.

== Habitat ==
Minimum recorded depth is 0 m. Maximum recorded depth is 33 mm (1.3 in).
