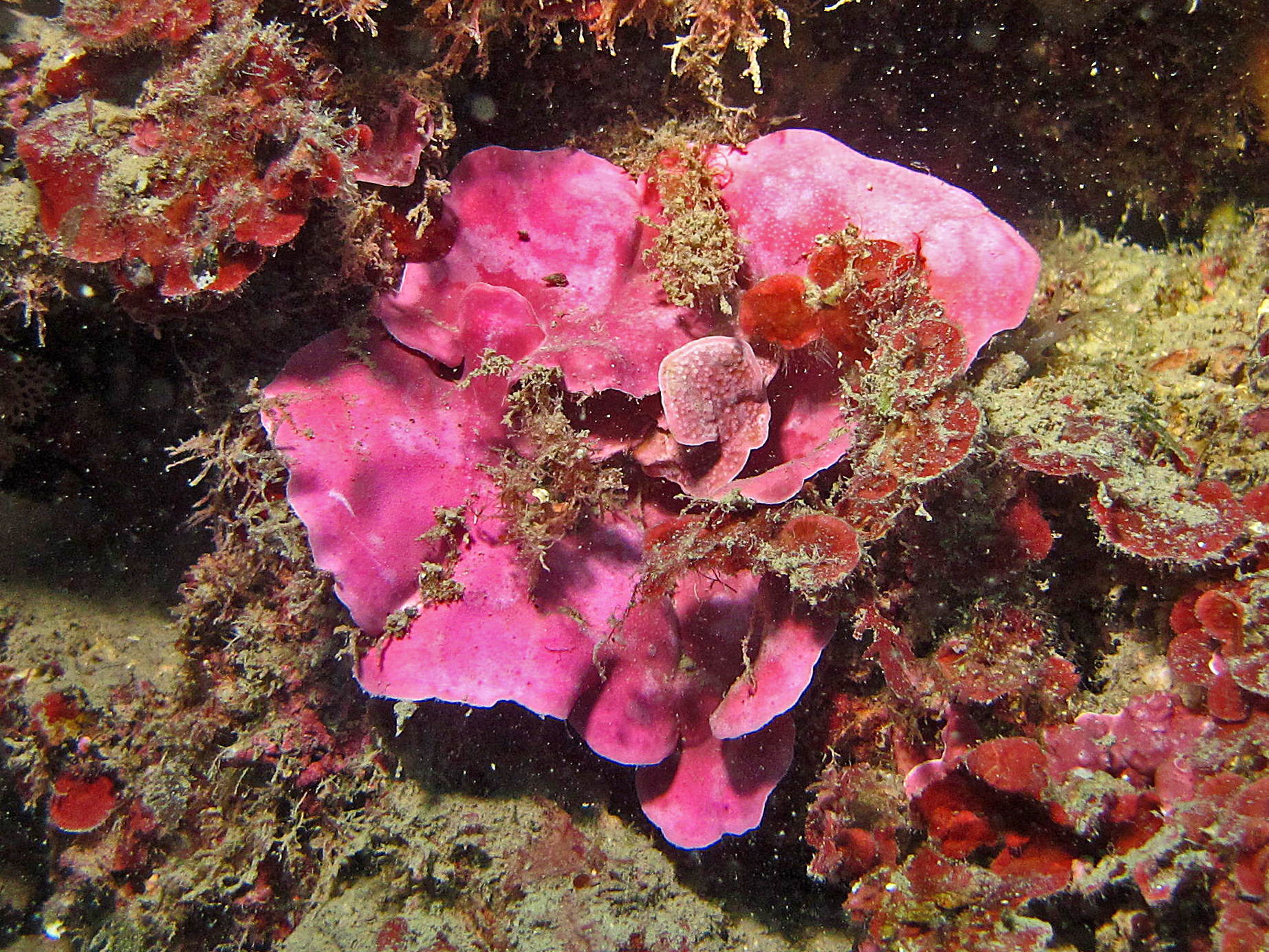
- Mesophyllum expansum

Scientific classification
- Domain: Eukaryota
- Clade: Archaeplastida
- Division: Rhodophyta
- Class: Florideophyceae
- Order: Corallinales
- Family: Hapalidiaceae
- Genus: Mesophyllum
- Species: M. expansum

Binomial name
- Mesophyllum expansum (Philippi) Cabioch & M.L.Mendoza, 2003

Synonyms
- Lithophyllum expansum Philippi 1837; Stereophyllum expansum (Philippi) Heydrich 1904; Pseudolithophyllum expansum (Philippi) M.Lemoine 1924

= Mesophyllum expansum =

Species of alga

Mesophyllum expansum is a species of red alga belonging to the family Hapalidiaceae.

== Description ==
Mesophyllum expansum can reach a diameter of about 30 centimetres (12 in). Illuminated by artificial light they show a beautiful pink color, with hanging branches. These calcareous encrusting organisms can be observed occasionally near the surface and can reach a depth of 70 metres (230 ft).

== Distribution ==
This species is widespread in the Mediterranean Sea.

== Bibliography ==
- Cabioch, J. & Mendoza, M.L. (2003). Mesophyllum expansum (Philippi) comb. nov. (Corallinales, Rhodophytes), et mise au point sur led Mesophyllum des mers d'Europe. Cahiers de Biologie Marine 44: 257–273.
- Guiry, M.D. (2009). Mesophyllum expansum (Philippi) Cabioch & Mendoza, 2003. In: Guiry, M.D. & Guiry, G.M. (2009). AlgaeBase. World-wide electronic publication, National University of Ireland, Galway.
