= Pomaulax spiratus =

Scientific classification
- Kingdom: Animalia
- Phylum: Mollusca
- Class: Gastropoda
- Subclass: Vetigastropoda
- Order: Trochida
- Family: Turbinidae
- Genus: Pomaulax
- Species: P. spiratus

Binomial name
- Pomaulax spiratus (Dall, 1911)

Synonyms
- Astraea spirata (Dall, 1911); Pachypoma inaequale spiratum Dall, 1911

Species of gastropod

Pomaulax spiratus is a species of sea snail, a marine gastropod mollusk in the family Turbinidae, the turban snails.

== Distribution ==
This species occurs in the Gulf of California, Western Mexico
