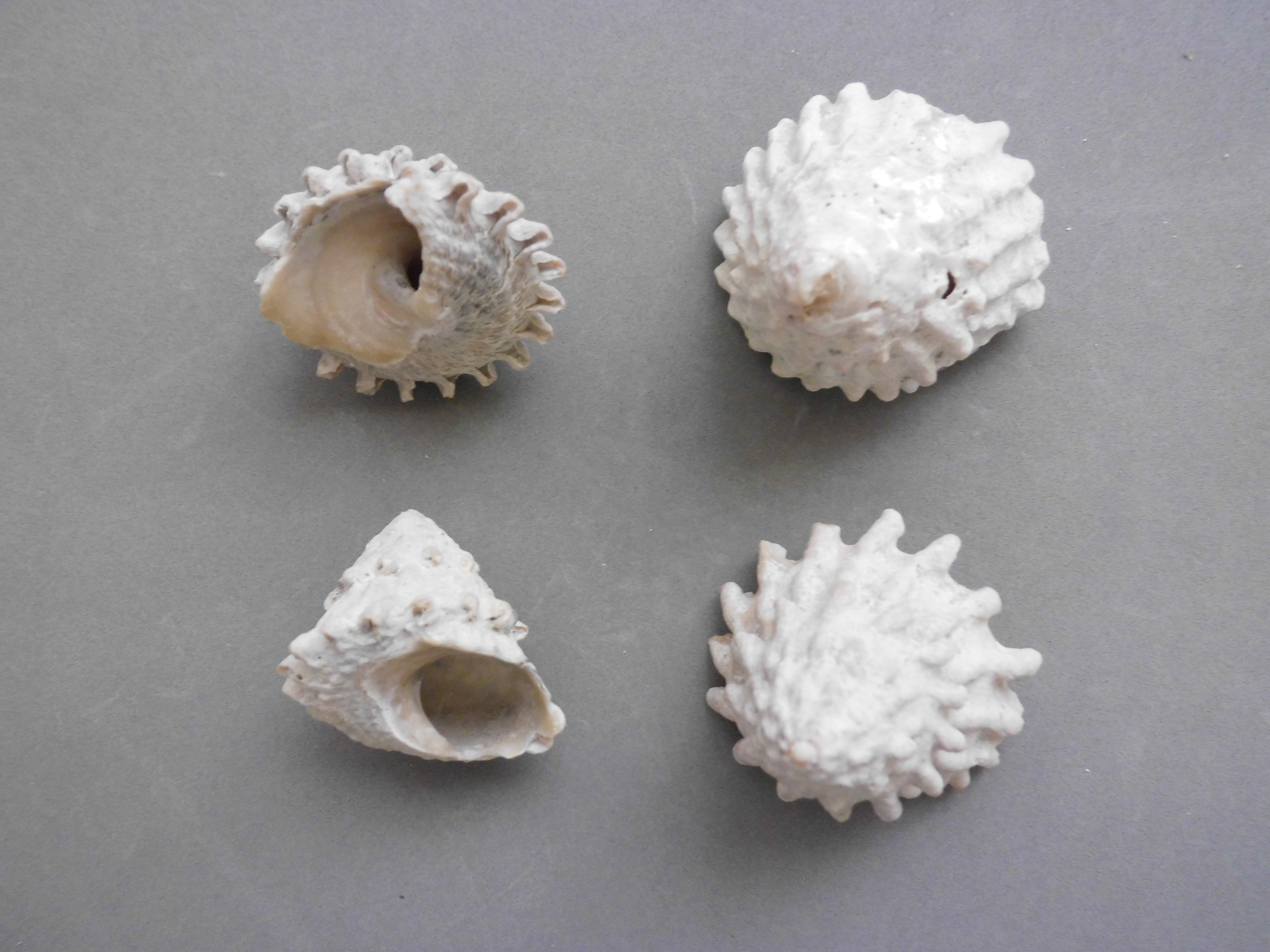
- Four shells of Lithopoma tectum

Scientific classification
- Kingdom: Animalia
- Phylum: Mollusca
- Class: Gastropoda
- Subclass: Vetigastropoda
- Order: Trochida
- Family: Turbinidae
- Genus: Lithopoma
- Species: L. tectum

Binomial name
- Lithopoma tectum (Lightfoot, 1786)

Synonyms
- Astraea cubanum Philippi, 1849; Astraea imbricatum Gmelin, 1791; Astraea olfersii Philippi, 1850; Astraea papillatum Potiez & Michaud, 1838; Astraea tectum Lightfoot, 1786; Astralium guadeloupense Crosse, 1865; Calcar olfersii Philippi, 1850; Imperator cubanum Philippi, 1849; Pachypoma cubanum Philippi, 1849; Trochus corolla Reeve, 1861; Trochus cubanus Philippi, 1849; Trochus imbricatus Gmelin, 1791; Trochus olfersii Philippi, 1850; Trochus papillatus Potiez & Michaud, 1838; Trochus papillosus Philippi, 1850; Trochus saxosus Philippi, 1850; Trochus tectus Lightfoot, 1786 (original combination); Trochus tuberosus Philippi, 1843; Turbo ramosus Mörch, 1852

= Lithopoma tectum =

Species of sea snail

Lithopoma tectum, common name the West Indian starsnail, is a species of sea snail, a marine gastropod mollusk in the family Turbinidae, the turban snails.

== Distribution ==
This species occurs in the Caribbean Sea, the Gulf of Mexico and the Lesser Antilles; in the Atlantic Ocean off Brazil.

== Description ==
The maximum recorded shell length is 63 mm.

The imperforate, solid shell has an elevated-conic shape. It is longitudinally subobliquely crinkled. Its color pattern is reddish orange, marked in places with white and olivaceous. The suture is impressed and irregular. The 6½ whorls are subplanulate above, slightly concave in the middle. The apical one or two are smooth, the following longitudinally plicate. The folds are cut in the middle by two impressed spiral lines, projecting at the carinated periphery, and about twenty-three in number on the body whorl. The base of the shell is nearly flat with radiating stripe and five subgranose lirae. The aperture is oblique and rhomboidal. The white columella is arcuate and bidentate at its base. The umbilical tract is pale violaceous, bounded by a plicate cordon. The operculum is convex on its outside, with a median rib, minutely granulose, and excavated near the middle.

== Habitat ==
The minimum recorded depth is 0 m; the maximum recorded depth is 10 m.
