= Crustaphytum =

Scientific classification
- Domain: Eukaryota
- Supergroup: Archaeplastida
- Division: Rhodophyta
- Class: Florideophyceae
- Order: Corallinales
- Family: Hapalidiaceae
- Subfamily: Melobesioideae
- Genus: Crustaphytum; L.-C.Liu &S.-M.Lin, 2018

Species
- Crustaphytum atlanticum Jesionek, Bahia & Amado-Filho; Crustaphytum pacificum L.-C.Liu & S.-M.Lin

Genus of algae

Crustaphytum is a genus of red alga first discovered in Taoyuan algal reefs by Taiwanese scientists. The epithet “crusta” refers to crustose thallus and “phytum” refers to plant. Belonging to the family Hapalidiaceae in the order Hapalidiales, Crustaphytum is one kind of crustose coralline algae (also known as non-geniculate coralline algae).

== Life cycle ==
Crustaphytum goes through the triphasic life cycle, a character of the phylum Rhodophyta, and all of its reproductive structures are protected by specialized conceptacles, sac-like structures that are situated in the receptacle. The triphasic life cycle alternates between haploid gametophytes, diploid carposporophytes, and diploid tetrasporophytes. Starting from gametophytes, both male and female gametes grow in conceptacles on the surface of the algal body (thalli). Male gametes then mature and are released through the cystic pore, entering the carpogonia and fertilize with female gametes. Afterwards, carposporophytes grow on the female gametophytes. Carpospores are produced and released when mature, developing into tetrasporophytes. Subsequently, four tetraspores are released from each conceptacle on the surface of the tetrasporophytes. As long as the tetraspores encounter suitable conditions, they will germinate and grow into gametophytes, completing a triphasic life cycle.

== Morphology ==
The algal body is monomerous and non-geniculate, consisting of thin and shell-like calcified leaflets (about 4 to 10 cm long and 3 to 5 cm wide), which can be irregularly fragmented or oval shaped. The dorsal surfaces of the calcified thalli are dark purple or dark red due to 5–10 layers or more of cortical cells containing photosynthetic pigments, and the ventral surfaces (towards the ground) grow closely to the reef matrix or other calcified organisms. Therefore, when observing Crustaphytum algae in the field, one can see that the edges of the calcified leaflets are wavy rather than tightly attached to the hard matrix. The thickness of the algal body is about 100 to 300 μm, with 35 to 45 cell layers.

The appearance and size of the gametophyte and the tetrasporophyte look almost the same with naked eyes. To differentiate, on the one hand, one can observe the longitudinal section through mature thallus of the gametophyte. The area of medullary cells comprises approximately 70% of the thickness can be seen to grow radially from the coaxial core. Perithallial filaments in the dorsal region are composed of 7–10 celled layers, including one or two layers of epithelial cells and one layer of subepithallial cells. Calcified crystal filaments in the meristem region are also radially arranged, and cell fusion is commonly found between adjacent cells. On the other hand, the tetrasporophyte has porous cavities with flat-topped tetrasporangia protruding from the surface of the algal body, and the each cavity has multiple bands divided similar to the Chinese character "目". To sum up, Crustaphytum can be separated from other related genera mainly by possessing coaxial thallus and relatively small tetrasporangiate conceptacle chambers (130 to 155 μm high by 115 to 200 μm wide).

== Ecology ==
=== Distribution ===
Crustaphytum prefers environments with higher nutrient salinity, higher sedimentation, and higher wave strength compared to corals. It mostly inhabits in lower intertidal zones attached to old algal reefs or pebbles, and sometimes it can be discovered in subtidal zones attached to rocks at 2–3 m depth. As of 2020, Crustaphytum pacificum has been recorded in northern Taiwan (mainly in Shimen and Taoyuan) and New Caledonia in southwestern Pacific Ocean. Crustaphytum atlanticum was discovered in southeastern Brazil.

=== Ecological roles ===
Crustaphytum plays many ecologically significant roles. When alive, it not only is an important producer of coastal regions but also uses the carbon dioxide released during calcification to produce glucose. Aside from that, the living algae can prevent the hard matrix from wave erosion, achieving the function of coastal protection. After death, it can form algal reefs, which creates habitat and provide shelter for many marine creatures.
