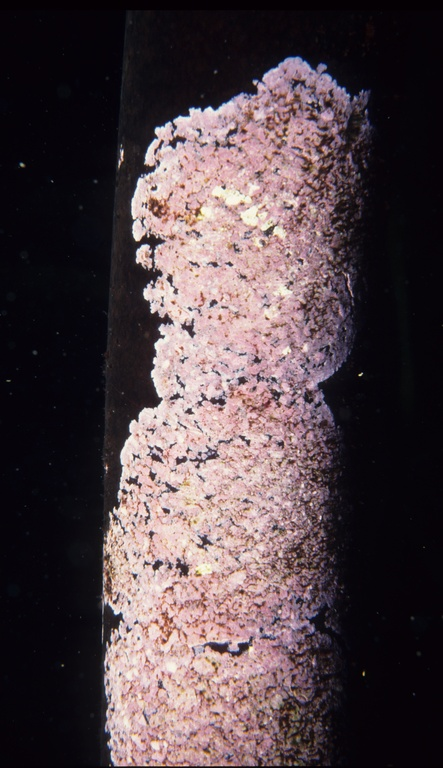
- Synarthrophyton eckloniae on stipe of Ecklonia maxima

Scientific classification
- Domain: Eukaryota
- Supergroup: Archaeplastida
- Division: Rhodophyta
- Class: Florideophyceae
- Order: Corallinales
- Family: Hapalidiaceae
- Subfamily: Melobesioideae
- Genus: Synarthrophyton; Townsend, 1979

= Synarthrophyton =

Genus of algae

Synarthrophyton is a genus of thalloid red algae comprising eight species. The monomerous, crustose thalli are composed of a single system of filaments which grow close to the underlying surface. Synarthrophyton reproduces by means of flask-shaped multiporate conceptacles; it produces tetraspores and dispores. Mucus plugs the opening of young conceptacles, which open as they mature.

== Species ==
The valid species currently considered to belong to this genus are:

- S. chejuensis
- S. eckloniae
- S. magellanicum
- S. munimentum
- S. patena
- S. robbenense
- S. schielianum
- S. schmitzii
