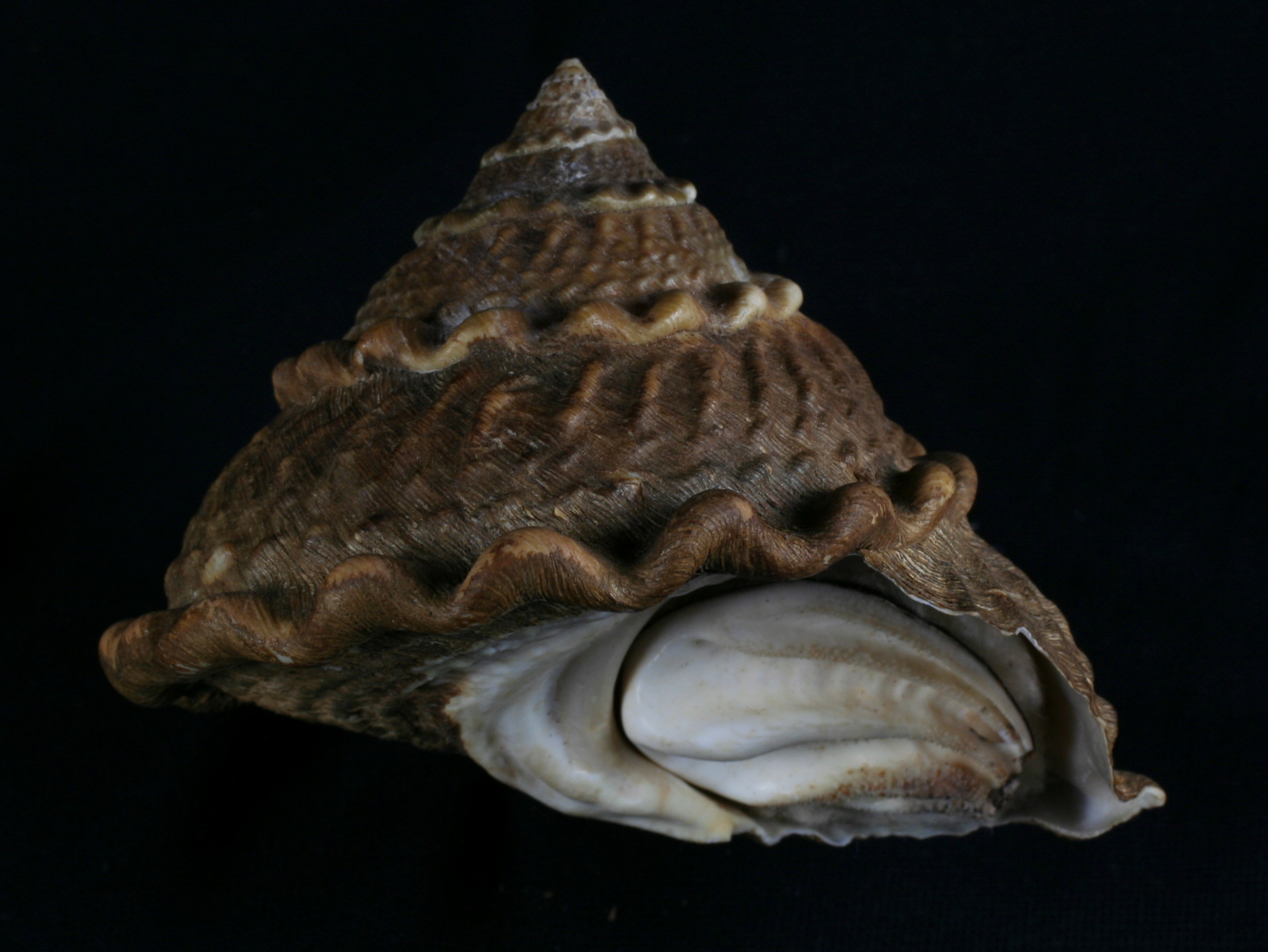
- Shell of Megastraea undosa (W. Wood, 1828), with operculum measuring 71.4 mm height by 89.9 mm diameter, collected at Salt Creek Beach, Laguna Niguel, in California.

Scientific classification
- Kingdom: Animalia
- Phylum: Mollusca
- Class: Gastropoda
- Subclass: Vetigastropoda
- Order: Trochida
- Superfamily: Trochoidea
- Family: Turbinidae
- Genus: Megastraea; McLean, 1970

Type species
- Trochus undosus W. Wood, 1828

= Megastraea =

Genus of gastropods

Megastraea is a genus of medium-sized to large sea snails with a calcareous operculum, marine gastropod mollusks in the family Turbinidae, the turban snails.

== Species ==
Species within this genus were previously placed in the genus Astraea. They include:

- Megastraea turbanica (Dall, 1910)
- Megastraea undosa (Wood, 1828)
