= Austrolithoideae =

Scientific classification
- Clade: Archaeplastida
- Division: Rhodophyta
- Class: Florideophyceae
- Order: Corallinales
- Family: Hapalidiaceae
- Subfamily: Austrolithoideae

Genera
- Austrolithon; Boreolithon

Subfamily of algae

The Austrolithoideae are a subfamily of coralline algae.
