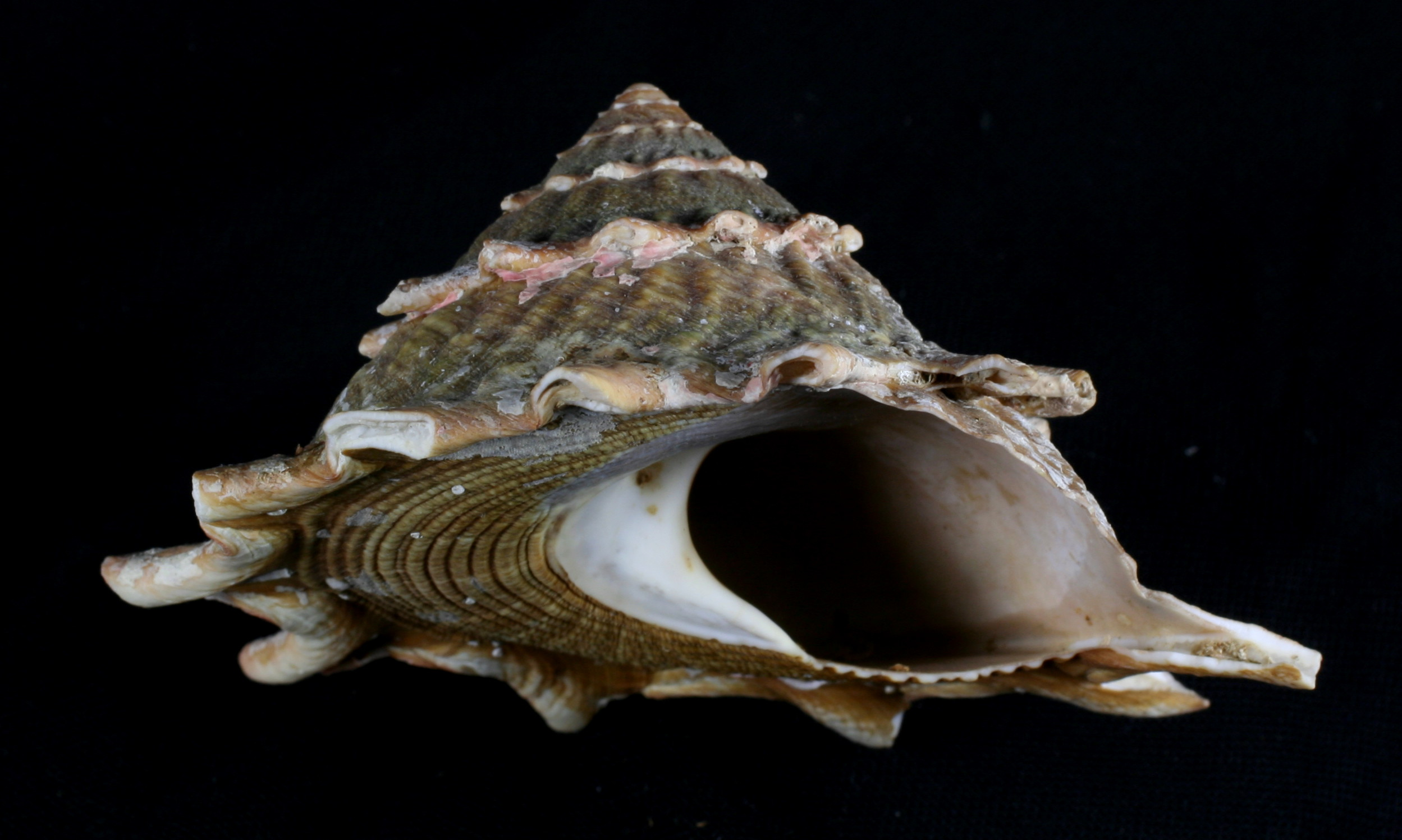
- Shell of Pomaulax japonicus (Dunker, 1844), measuring 47.7 mm (1.88 in) in height by 74.8 mm (2.94 in) in diameter, collected with tangle nets at a depth of 20 m (66 ft) off Pt. Daio, Shima-cho, Japan.

Scientific classification
- Kingdom: Animalia
- Phylum: Mollusca
- Class: Gastropoda
- Subclass: Vetigastropoda
- Order: Trochida
- Family: Turbinidae
- Genus: Pomaulax
- Species: P. japonicus

Binomial name
- Pomaulax japonicus (Dunker, 1844)

Synonyms
- Astralium (Pomaulax) japonicum (Dunker, 1844); Trochus japonicus Dunker, 1845

= Pomaulax japonicus =

Species of gastropod

Pomaulax japonicus, the Japanese star shell, is a species of sea snail. It is a marine gastropod mollusk in the family Turbinidae, the turban snails.

== Description ==
P. Japonicus has a large, imperforate, pale-yellowish shell with a depressed-conic shape, which can attain a size of 90 millimetres (3.5 in). The six whorls are planulate above, and obliquely tuberculate-plicate. The periphery is expanded, compressed and carinated, bearing wide nodose spines, while the base of the shell is planulate, with concentric tuberculate lirae. The white umbilical tract is callous and depressed, and the aperture is transversely dilated, subrhomboidal and angulate.

== Distribution ==
This marine species occurs off Japan and Korea.

== General references ==
- Alf A. & Kreipl K. (2011) The family Turbinidae. Subfamilies Turbininae Rafinesque, 1815 and Prisogasterinae Hickman & McLean, 1990. In: G.T. Poppe & K. Groh (eds), A Conchological Iconography. Hackenheim: Conchbooks. pp. 1–82, pls 104–245.
