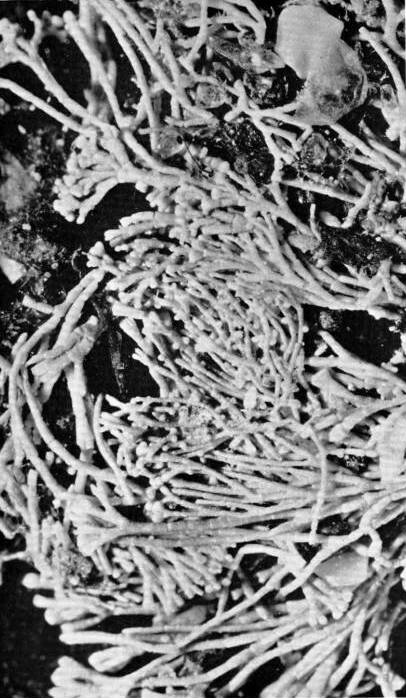
- Choreonema thureti. A small portion of a clump of Jania ungulata showing, in the central part of the plate, the lateral subspherical pericarps of Choreonema

Scientific classification
- Clade: Archaeplastida
- Division: Rhodophyta
- Class: Florideophyceae
- Order: Corallinales
- Family: Hapalidiaceae
- Subfamily: Choreonematoideae
- Genus: Choreonema; F.Schmitz, 1889

= Choreonema =

Genus of algae

Choreonema is a genus of red algae belonging to the family Hapalidiaceae.

The genus has almost cosmopolitan distribution.

Species:

- Choreonema notarisii (Dufour) Foslie
- Choreonema thuretii (Bornet) F.Schmitz
