= Choreonematoideae =

Scientific classification
- Clade: Archaeplastida
- Division: Rhodophyta
- Class: Florideophyceae
- Order: Corallinales
- Family: Hapalidiaceae
- Subfamily: Choreonematoideae
- Genus: Choreonema

Subfamily of algae

The Choreonematoideae are a monogeneric nongeniculate subfamily of Coralline algae.
