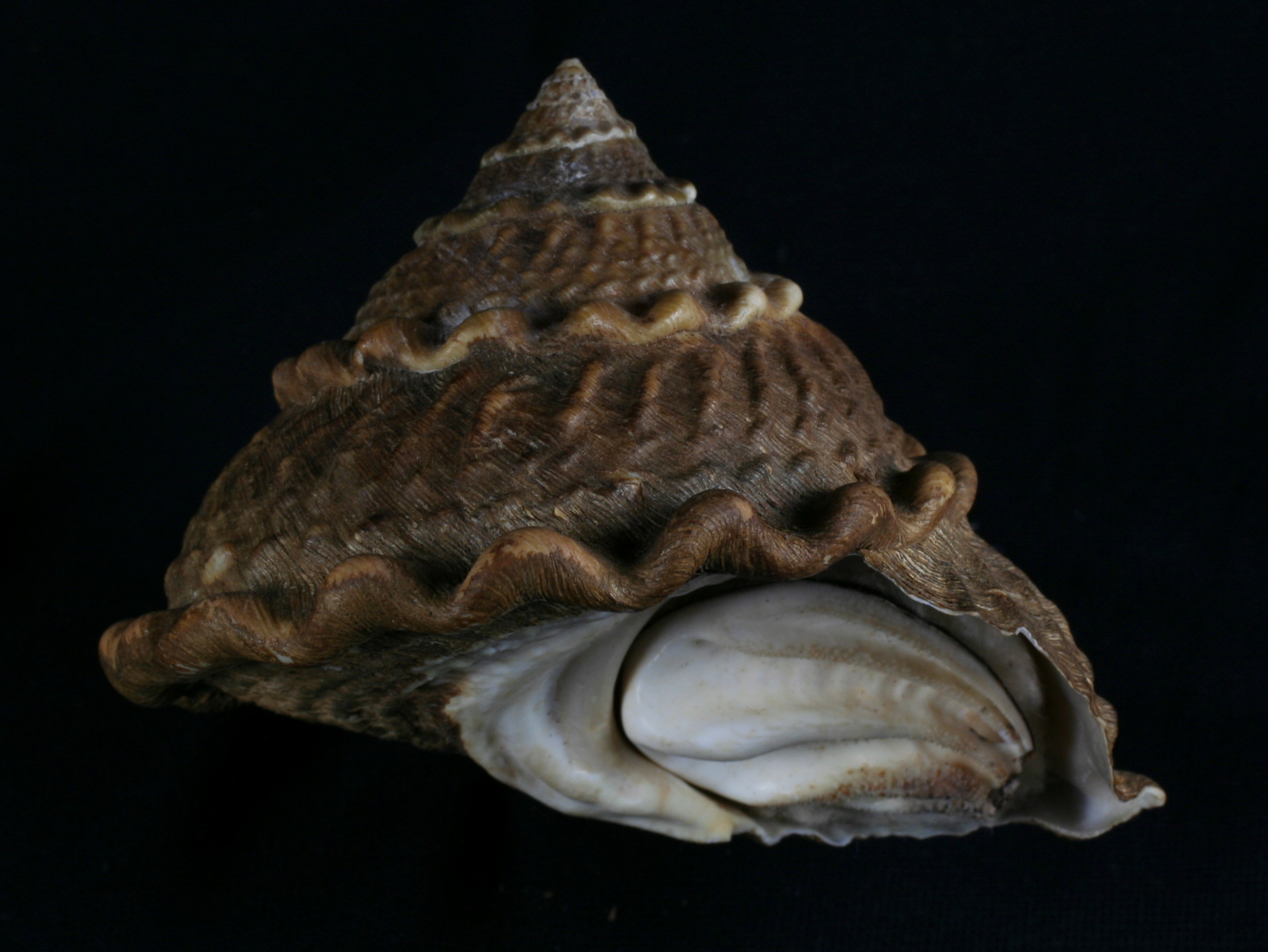
- Shell and operculum of Megastraea undosa (W. Wood, 1828), measuring 71.4 mm height by 89.9 mm diameter, collected at Salt Creek Beach, Laguna Niguel, in California.

Scientific classification
- Kingdom: Animalia
- Phylum: Mollusca
- Class: Gastropoda
- Subclass: Vetigastropoda
- Order: Trochida
- Family: Turbinidae
- Genus: Megastraea
- Species: M. undosa

Binomial name
- Megastraea undosa (W. Wood, 1828)

Synonyms'
- Lithopoma undosum (W. Wood, 1828); Astraea undosa (W. Wood, 1828); Pomaulax undosum W. Wood, 1828; Trochus undosus W. Wood, 1828 (basionym)

= Megastraea undosa =

Species of gastropod

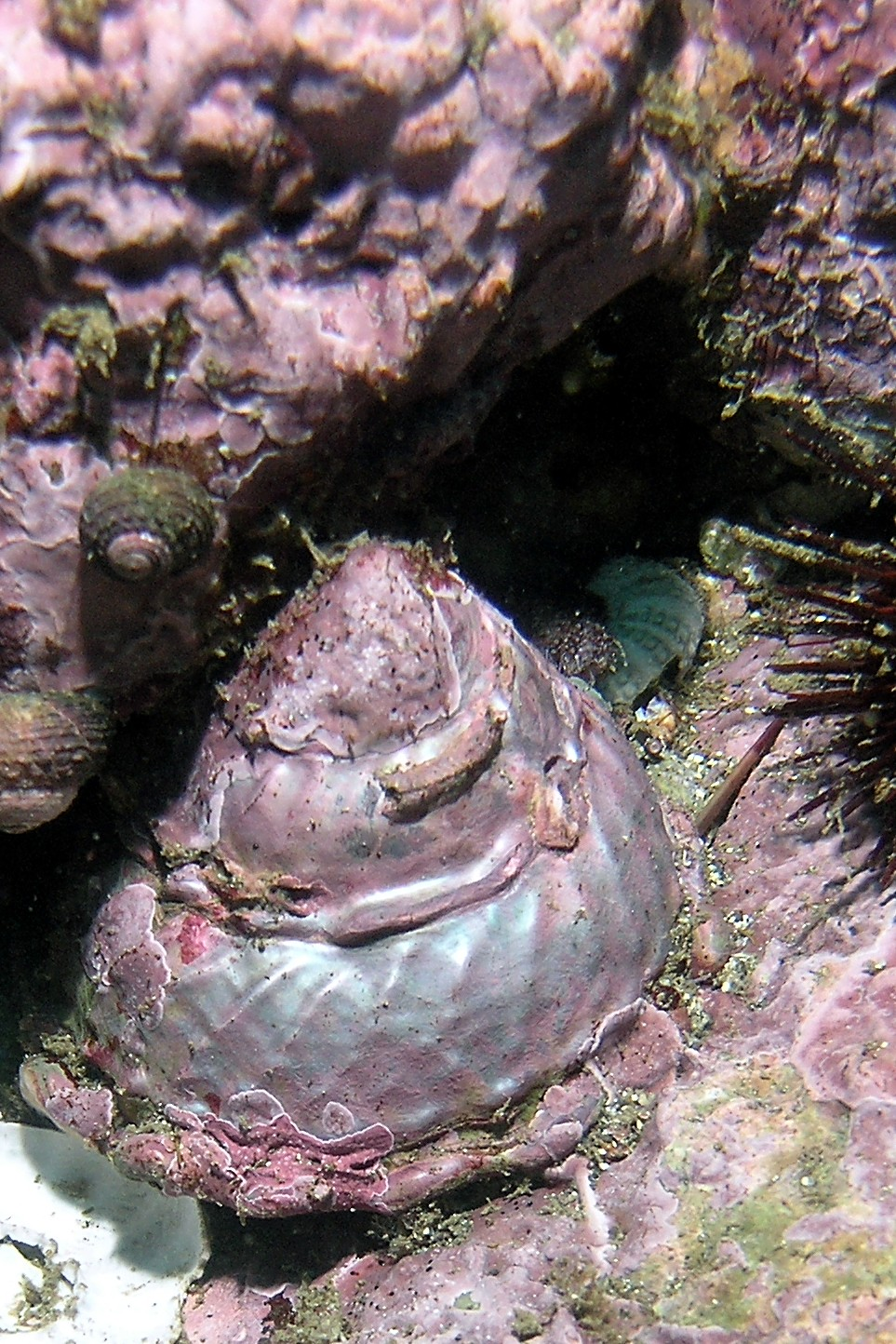
An old empty shell of Megastraea undosa, wedged under a rock and covered in the pink coralline alga Lithothamnion, which has cemented it to the substrate.

Megastraea undosa, common name the wavy turban snail, is a species of sea snail, a marine gastropod mollusk in the family Turbinidae, the turban snails. This species is native to the coast of California.

== Distribution ==
This species occurs in the eastern Pacific Ocean from California, USA to Central Baja California, Mexico.

== Description ==
One of the largest gastropod shells found on the Southern California coast, this species varies between 40 mm and 145 mm. The shell lacks an umbilicus, and has a turbinate-conical shape. Like other shells of the family turbinidae it is composed of a thick inner nacreous layer, covered by a thinner porcellanous layer. In this species both are covered by a dark brown shaggy periostracum in life. The periphery of the shell forms a twisted ridge at the outer edge of each whorl. Each whorl also has regular, coarsely sculpted rows of fine knobs and folds. The base is marked with several spiral cords concentric to the arcuated columella which has a pearly groove. The unusual operculum has four strong ridges on its outer side decorated with hard shelly bristles that radiate in a curvilinear fashion from its pointed edge.

== Habitat ==
This large snail inhabits rocky shores in shallow waters, generally protected areas below the low tide level.
