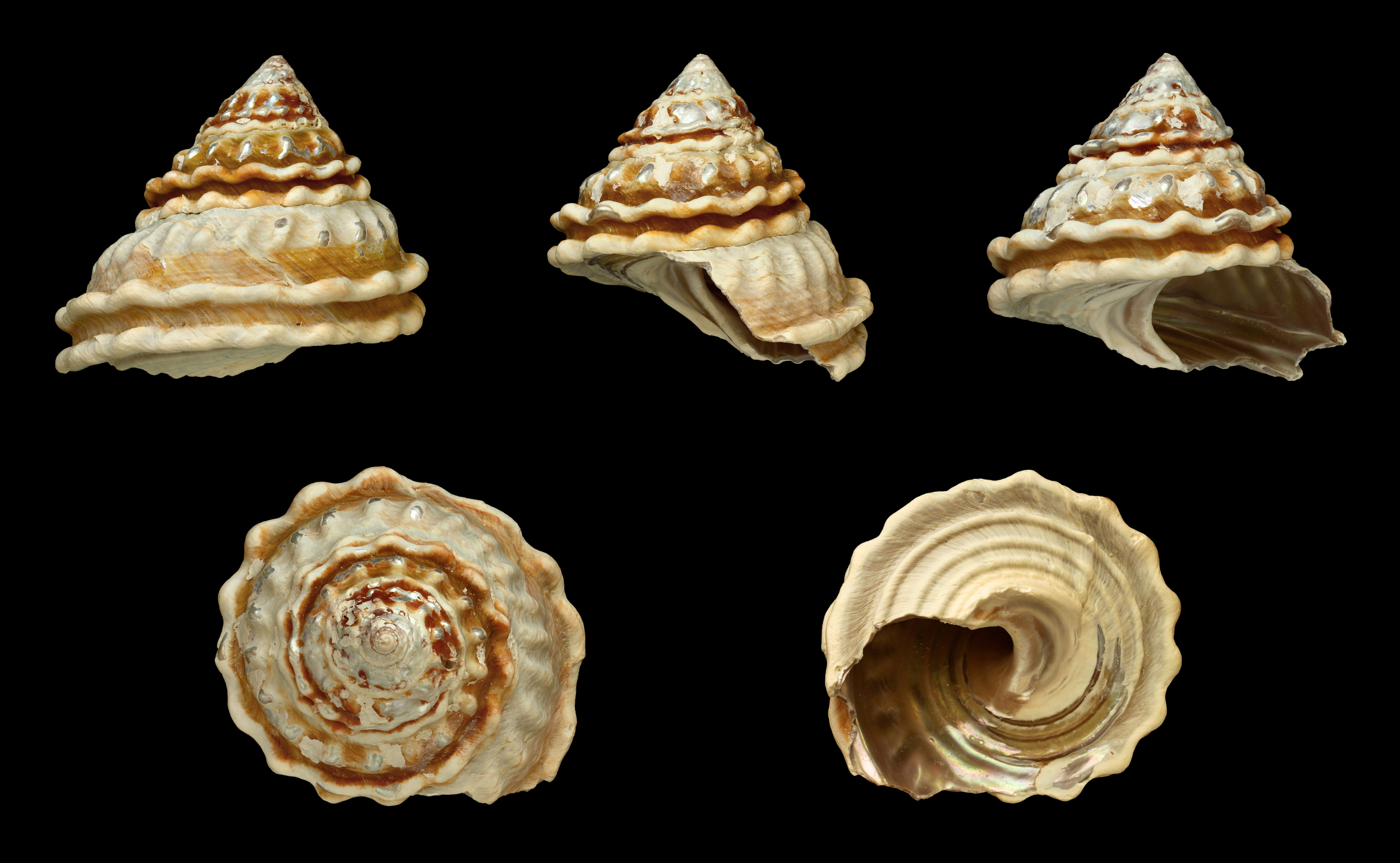
- Shell of Megastraea turbanica (Dall, 1910)

Scientific classification
- Kingdom: Animalia
- Phylum: Mollusca
- Class: Gastropoda
- Subclass: Vetigastropoda
- Order: Trochida
- Family: Turbinidae
- Genus: Megastraea
- Species: M. turbanica

Binomial name
- Megastraea turbanica (Dall, 1910)

Synonyms
- Astraea petrothauma Berry, 1940; Astraea (Uvanilla) rupicollina Stohler, 1959; Pomaulax turbanicus Dall, 1910 (basionym)

= Megastraea turbanica =

Species of gastropod

Megastraea turbanica, common name the turban star shell, is a species of sea snail, a marine gastropod mollusk in the family Turbinidae, the turban snails.

== Description ==
The size of the shell attains 150 mm. The shell is moderately large and rather thin. It is brilliantly pearly inside. It is covered with a reddish-brown periostracum which becomes olivaceous on the base. The form is rather depressed with turgid whorls, about six in all. The nucleus is white, blunt, imperfect. The base of the shell is flattened, bordered by a sparsely nodulous carina. The sculpture on the spire is slightly protractive, rounded, and short. It contains rather elevated riblets reaching about halfway forward on the whorl from the suture (17 on the last whorl). These end in or are barely separated from the same number of stout nodules at the periphery, with a marked sulcus separating them from a similar row of nodules on the margin of the base. The base contains four somewhat undulated spiral ridges separated by subequal interspaces, except the inner pair which are smaller and closer to each other. The base is imperforate and is swollen at the base of the columella. The aperture is ample. The surface of the bodyis erased, leaving visible a pearly and white substance. The pearly columella is arcuate with no anterior prominence or tooth. The outer lip and the base is simple and sharp. The white operculum is rounded, shelly, with three partly gyrate, very prominent, granose, narrow ribs. The spaces between them are excavated and smooth.

== Distribution ==
This species occurs in the Pacific Ocean off California, USA.
