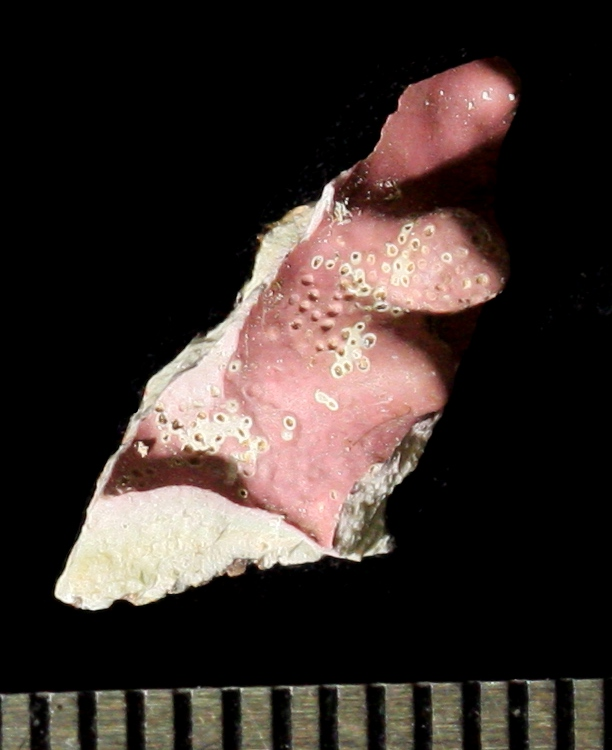
- L. glaciale showing conceptacles. Millimetre scale

Scientific classification
- Domain: Eukaryota
- Supergroup: Archaeplastida
- Division: Rhodophyta
- Class: Florideophyceae
- Order: Corallinales
- Family: Hapalidiaceae
- Genus: Lithothamnion; Heydrich, 1897

= Lithothamnion =

Lithothamnion Temporal range: Cretaceous–Recent

Genus of algae

Lithothamnion is a genus of thalloid red alga comprising 103 species. Its members are known by a number of common names, such as griuán, maërl, punalevä-suku, stenhinna, and maerl. The monomerous, crustose thalli are composed of a single system of filaments which grow close to the underlying surface. Lithothamnion reproduces by means of multiporate conceptacles.

== Species ==
The valid species currently considered to belong to this genus are:

- Lithothamnion album
- Lithothamnion antarcticum
- Lithothamnion apiculatum
- Lithothamnion asperulatum
- Lithothamnion aucklandicum
- Lithothamnion australe
- Lithothamnion brasiliense
- Lithothamnion breviaxe
- Lithothamnion calcareum
- Lithothamnion californicum
- Lithothamnion capense
- Lithothamnion carolii
- Lithothamnion chathamense
- Lithothamnion circumscriptum
- Lithothamnion colliculosum
- Lithothamnion corallioides
- Lithothamnion coralloides
- Lithothamnion cottonii
- Lithothamnion coulmanicum
- Lithothamnion crispatum
- Lithothamnion dehiscens
- Lithothamnion diguetii
- Lithothamnion ectocarpon
- Lithothamnion elegans
- Lithothamnion engelhartii
- Lithothamnion esperi
- Lithothamnion expansum
- Lithothamnion flavescens
- Lithothamnion fornicatum
- Lithothamnion fragiissimum
- Lithothamnion fruticulosum
- Lithothamnion fuegianum
- Lithothamnion geppiorum
- Lithothamnion gibbosum
- Lithothamnion giganteum
- Lithothamnion glaciale
- Lithothamnion grade
- Lithothamnion grande
- Lithothamnion granuliferum
- Lithothamnion guadalupense
- Lithothamnion hamelii
- Lithothamnion haptericola
- Lithothamnion hauckii
- Lithothamnion heterocladum
- Lithothamnion heteromorphum
- Lithothamnion incrustans
- Lithothamnion indicum
- Lithothamnion insigne
- Lithothamnion intermedium
- Lithothamnion islei
- Lithothamnion japonicum
- Lithothamnion kerguelenum
- Lithothamnion labradorense
- Lithothamnion lacroixi
- Lithothamnion laminosum
- Lithothamnion lemoineae
- Lithothamnion magnum
- Lithothamnion maldivicum
- Lithothamnion mangini
- Lithothamnion margaritae
- Lithothamnion marlothii
- Lithothamnion minervae
- Lithothamnion montereyicum
- Lithothamnion muelleri
- Lithothamnion murmanicum
- Lithothamnion neglectum
- Lithothamnion nitidum
- Lithothamnion nodulosum
- Lithothamnion norvegicum
- Lithothamnion notarisii
- Lithothamnion novae-zelandiae
- Lithothamnion occidentale
- Lithothamnion pacificum
- Lithothamnion pauciporosum
- Lithothamnion peleense
- Lithothamnion peruviense
- Lithothamnion philippii
- Lithothamnion phymatodeum
- Lithothamnion pocillum
- Lithothamnion polymorphum
- Lithothamnion praefruticulosum
- Lithothamnion proliferum
- Lithothamnion propontidis
- Lithothamnion rugosum
- Lithothamnion ruptile
- Lithothamnion scabiosum
- Lithothamnion sejunctum
- Lithothamnion sonderi
- Lithothamnion soriferum
- Lithothamnion spissum
- Lithothamnion squarrulosum
- Lithothamnion tenue
- Lithothamnion thelostegium
- Lithothamnion tophiforme
- Lithothamnion tusterense
- Lithothamnion ungeri
- Lithothamnion valens
- Lithothamnion validum
- Lithothamnion van
- Lithothamnion vanheurckii
- Lithothamnion vescum
- Lithothamnion volcanum

== Uses ==
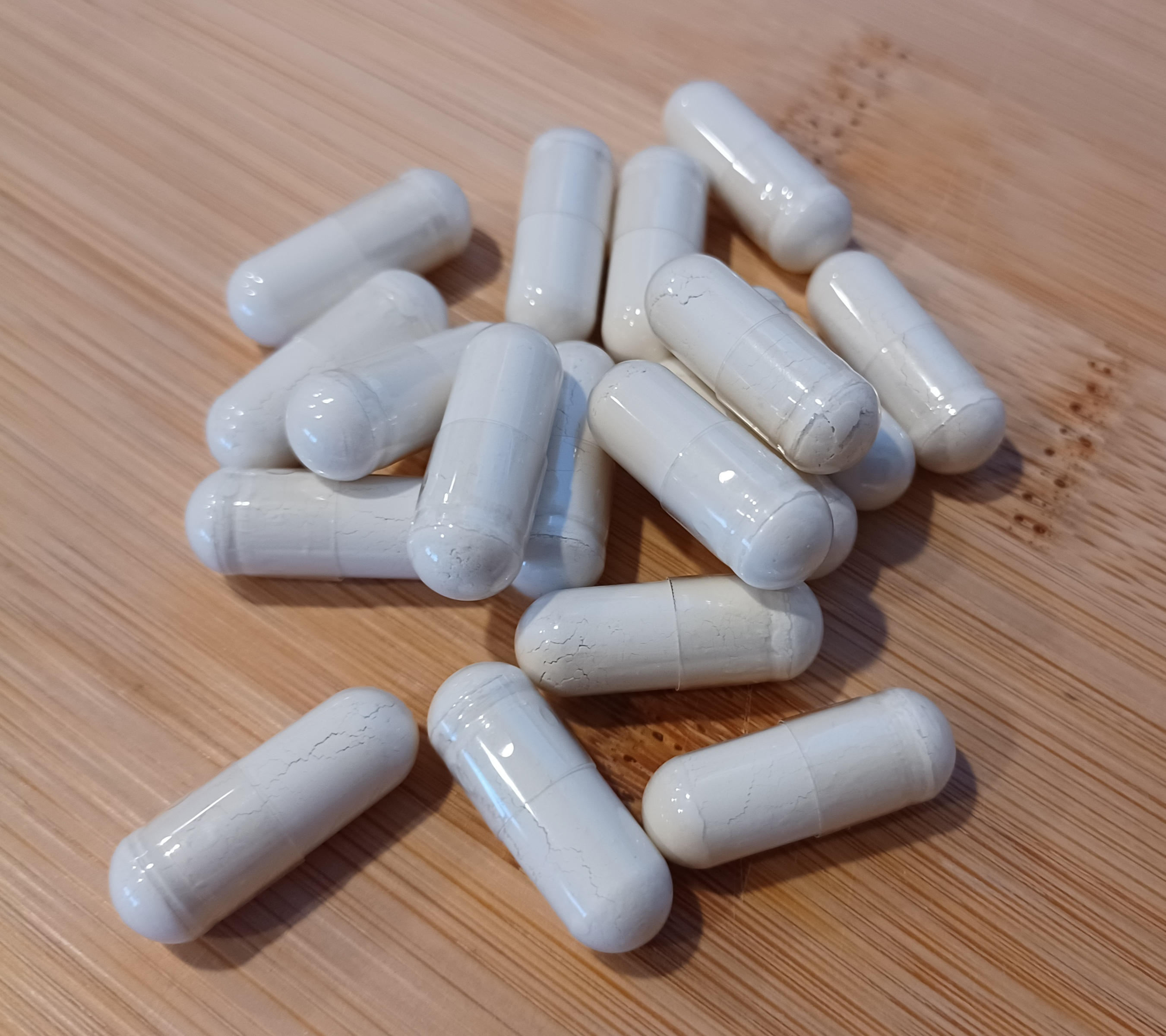
Calcium supplements made from Lithothamnium calcareum

The species Lithothamnium calcareum is, besides Tricalcium phosphate, often used as food fortification in plant-based milk substitutes to achieve a similar calcium content as a cow milk which is around 120 mg/100 ml. However, in April 2021 the European Court of Justice forbade its use in organic food products such as drinks.
