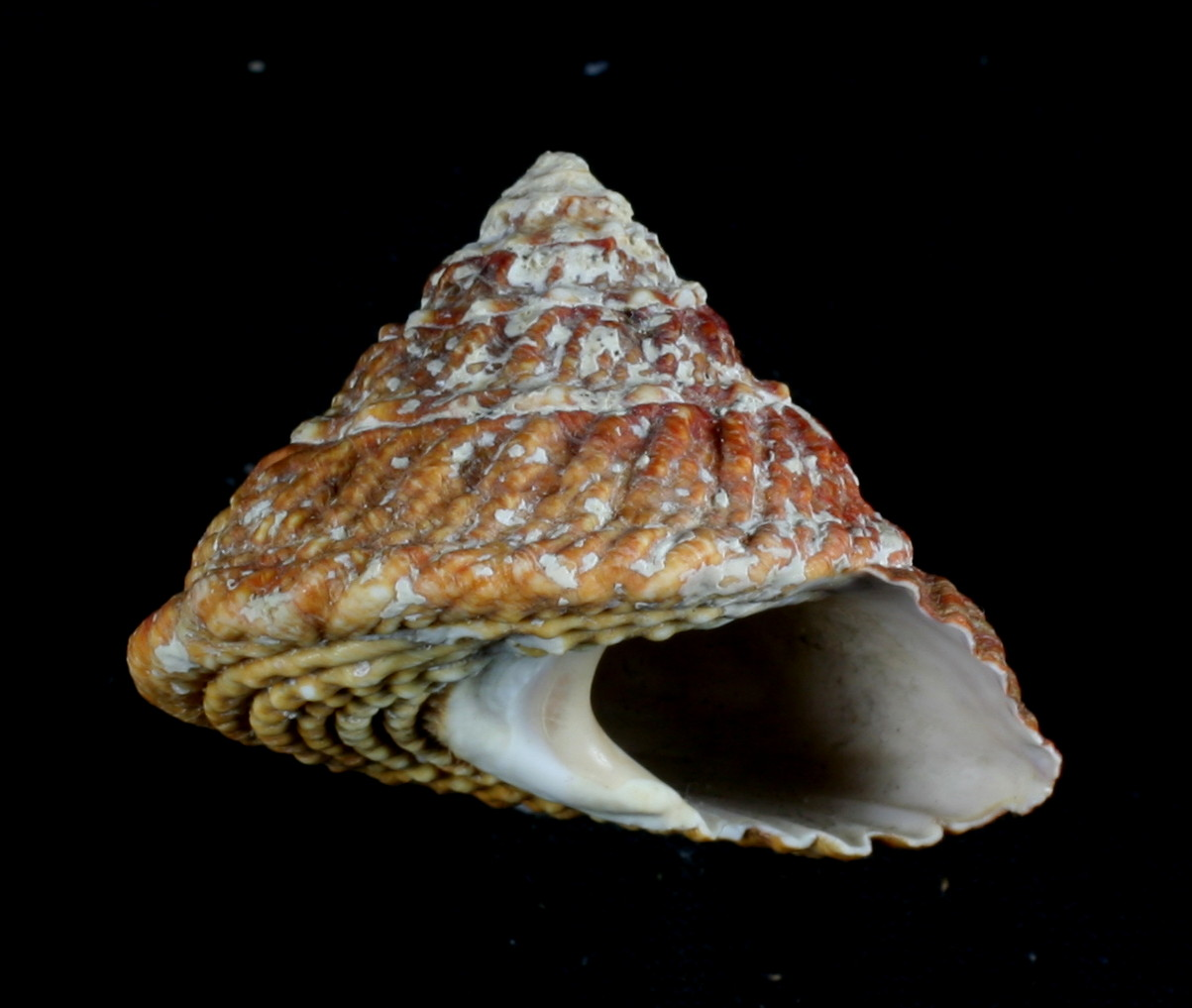
- Shell of Pomaulax gibberosus (Dillwyn, 1817), measuring 32.8 mm height by 42.6 mm in diameter, collected off San Pedro, in California

Scientific classification
- Domain: Eukaryota
- Kingdom: Animalia
- Phylum: Mollusca
- Class: Gastropoda
- Subclass: Vetigastropoda
- Order: Trochida
- Superfamily: Trochoidea
- Family: Turbinidae
- Genus: Pomaulax
- Species: P. gibberosus

Binomial name
- Pomaulax gibberosus (Dillwyn, 1817)

Synonyms
- Astraea gibberosa; Astraea (Pachypoma) inaequalis var. pacifica Dall, 1919; Astraea guadalupeana Berry, 1957; Lithopoma gibberosa (Dillwyn, 1817); Lithopoma gibberosum (Dillwyn, 1817); Pachypoma inaequale Dall, 1909; Trochus gibberosus Dillwyn, 1817 (basionym); Trochus ochraceus Philippi, 1846; Trochus tectumchinense Noodt, 1819

= Pomaulax gibberosus =

Species of gastropod

Pomaulax gibberosus, common name the red turban snail, is a species of medium-sized to large sea snail with a calcareous operculum, a marine gastropod mollusk in the family Turbinidae, the turban snails.

== Description ==
The shell of Pomaulax gibberosus is cone-shaped with whorls, and reaches up to 7.5 centimetres (3.0 in) wide and 5.7 centimetres (2.2 in) tall. The color is red-brown with brown periostracum.

== Distribution and habitat ==
This species is found along the coasts of the Eastern Pacific, from British Columbia, Canada, to Baja California, Mexico. It inhabits the low intertidal zone to depths of around 80 metres (260 ft), where it is found on rocks and giant kelp.

== Gallery ==
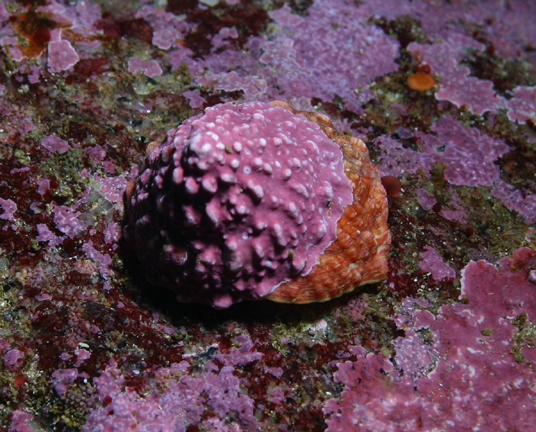
Pomaulax gibberosus, the shell encrusted with the red coralline alga Lithothamnion

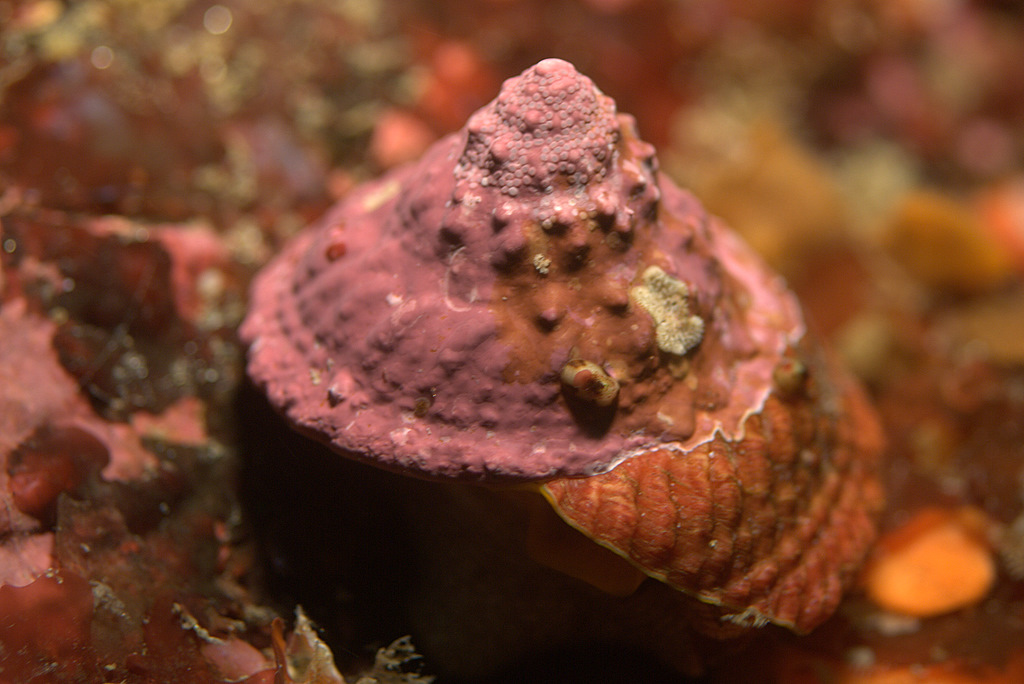
Pomaulax gibberosus

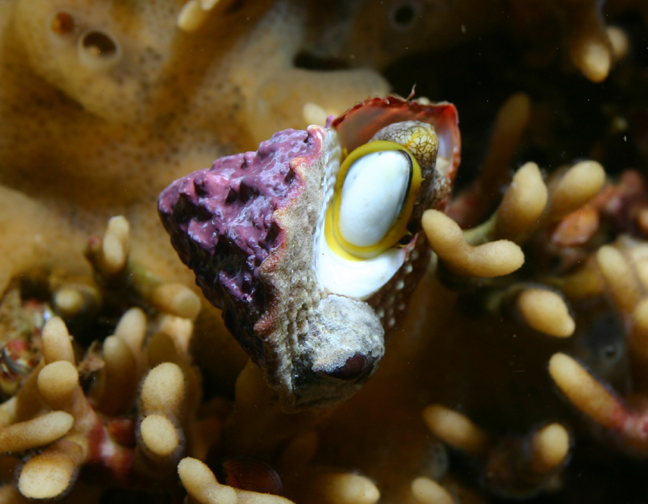
A live specimen of Pomaulax gibberosus
