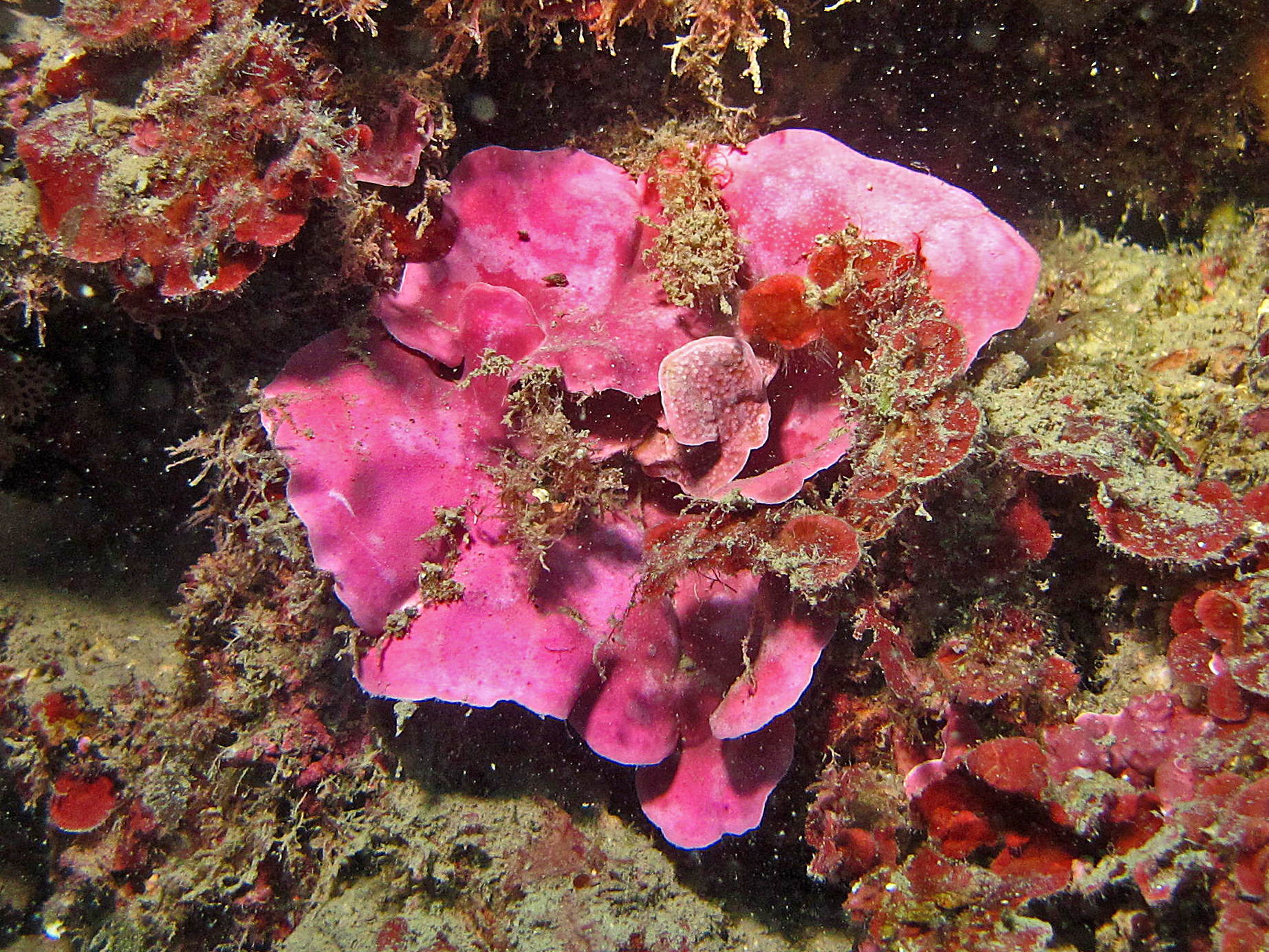
- Mesophyllum expansum

Scientific classification
- Clade: Archaeplastida
- Division: Rhodophyta
- Class: Florideophyceae
- Order: Corallinales
- Family: Hapalidiaceae; J.E. Gray

= Hapalidiaceae =

Family of algae

Hapalidiaceae is a family of red alga belonging to the order Corallinales.

== Subtaxa ==
- Genus Aethesolithon J.H.Johnson, 1964
- Genus Callilithophytum P.W.Gabrielson, W.H.Adey, G.P.Johnson & Hernández-Kantún, 2015
- Genus Nullipora J.B.de Lamarck, 1801, nom. rejic. (currently regarded as a synonym of Phymatolithon)
- Genus Tectolithon Bahia, Jesionek & Amado-Filho, 2020
- Subfamily 1. Austrolithoideae A.S.Harvey & Woelkerling, 1995

Genera: Austrolithon, Boreolithon, Epulo.

- Subfamíly 2. Choreonematoideae Woelkerling, 1987

Genera: Choreonema.

- Subfamíly 3. Melobesioideae Bizzozero, 1885

Genera: Crustaphytum, Epilithon, Exilicrusta, Mastophoropsis, Melobesia, Neopolyporolithon, Sphaeranthera, Synarthrophyton.

== Bibliography ==
- Gray, J.E. (1864). Handbook of British Water-Weeds or Algae.. pp. i-iv, 1–123. London: R. Hardwicke.
- Harvey, A.S., Broadwater, S.T., Woelkerling, W.J. & Mitrovski, P.J. (2003). Choreonema (Corallinales, Rhodophyta): 18S rDNA phylogeny and resurrection of the Hapalidiaceae for the subfamilies Choreonematoideae, Austrolithoideae and Melobesioideae. Journal of Phycology 39: 988–998.
- Yoon, H.S., Muller, K.M., Sheath, R.G., Ott, F.D. & Bhattacharya, D. (2006). Defining the major lineages of red algae (Rhodophyta). Journal of Phycology 42: 482–492.
- Guiry, M.D. (2009). Hapalidiaceae. In: Guiry, M.D. & Guiry, G.M. (2009). AlgaeBase. World-wide electronic publication, National University of Ireland, Galway.
- Adele S. Harvey, Wm J. Woelkerling and Alan J. K. Millar An account of the Hapalidiaceae (Corallinales, Rhodophyta) in south-eastern Australia
