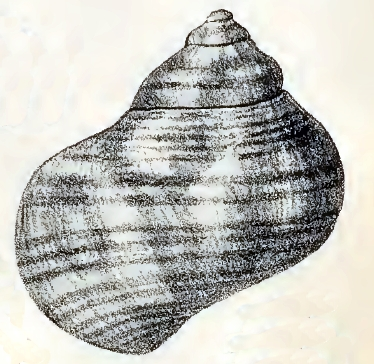
- Drawing of a shell of Turbo militaris (smooth form)

Scientific classification
- Kingdom: Animalia
- Phylum: Mollusca
- Class: Gastropoda
- Subclass: Vetigastropoda
- Order: Trochida
- Family: Turbinidae
- Genus: Turbo
- Species: T. militaris

Binomial name
- Turbo militaris Reeve, 1848

Synonyms
- Turbo (Dinassovica) militaris Reeve, 1848; Turbo (Lunatica) militaris Reeve, 1848

= Turbo militaris =

Species of gastropod

Turbo militaris, common name the military turban, is a species of sea snail, marine gastropod mollusk in the family Turbinidae.

This species is also often confused with Turbo imperialis.

== Description ==
The length of the shell varies between 60 mm and 100 mm. The large, solid shell has rounded whorls. It is variable in its external morphology, due to the presence or absence of spines. There are both smooth (except for growth striae close the lips) and spiny forms (with two rows of open-fronted spines on the body whorl). There are also forms with a morphology between these two extremes. They also differ in the presence of the anterior canal, which is almost non-existent in the smooth forms, but prominent in the spiny forms. These two forms can be found together on the same site. The aperture is subcircular and pearly white within. The simple outer lip is rather thin. The color pattern of the shell is formed by spiral bands of brown or green over a fawn background. The columella is smooth with a white callus with green edges. The subcircular operculum is calcareous. Its outer surface is white with a slight amount of green.

== Distribution ==
This marine species occurs off Australia from North Queensland to New South Wales, Australia
