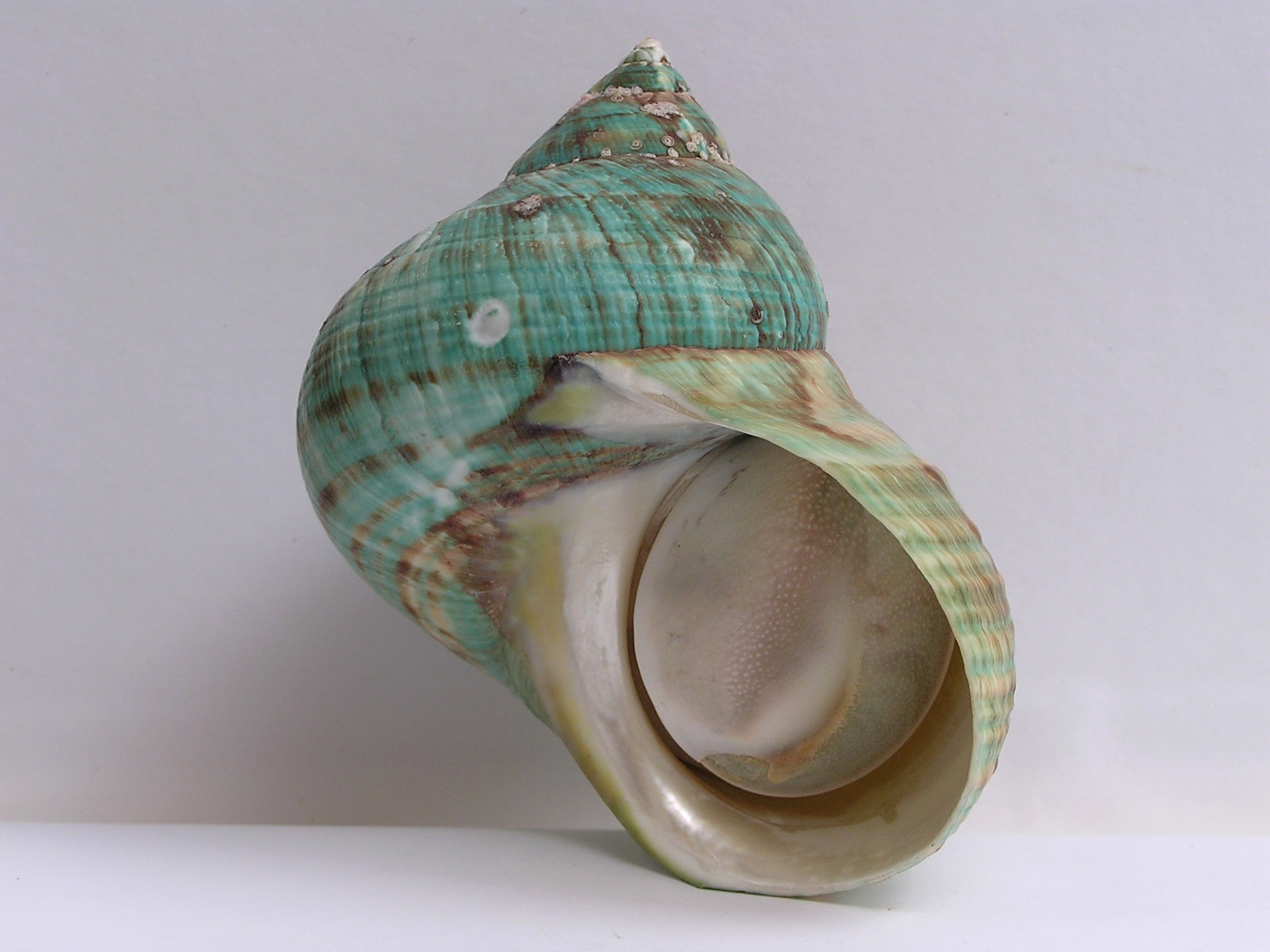
- Apertural view of a shell of Turbo imperialis with operculum in place
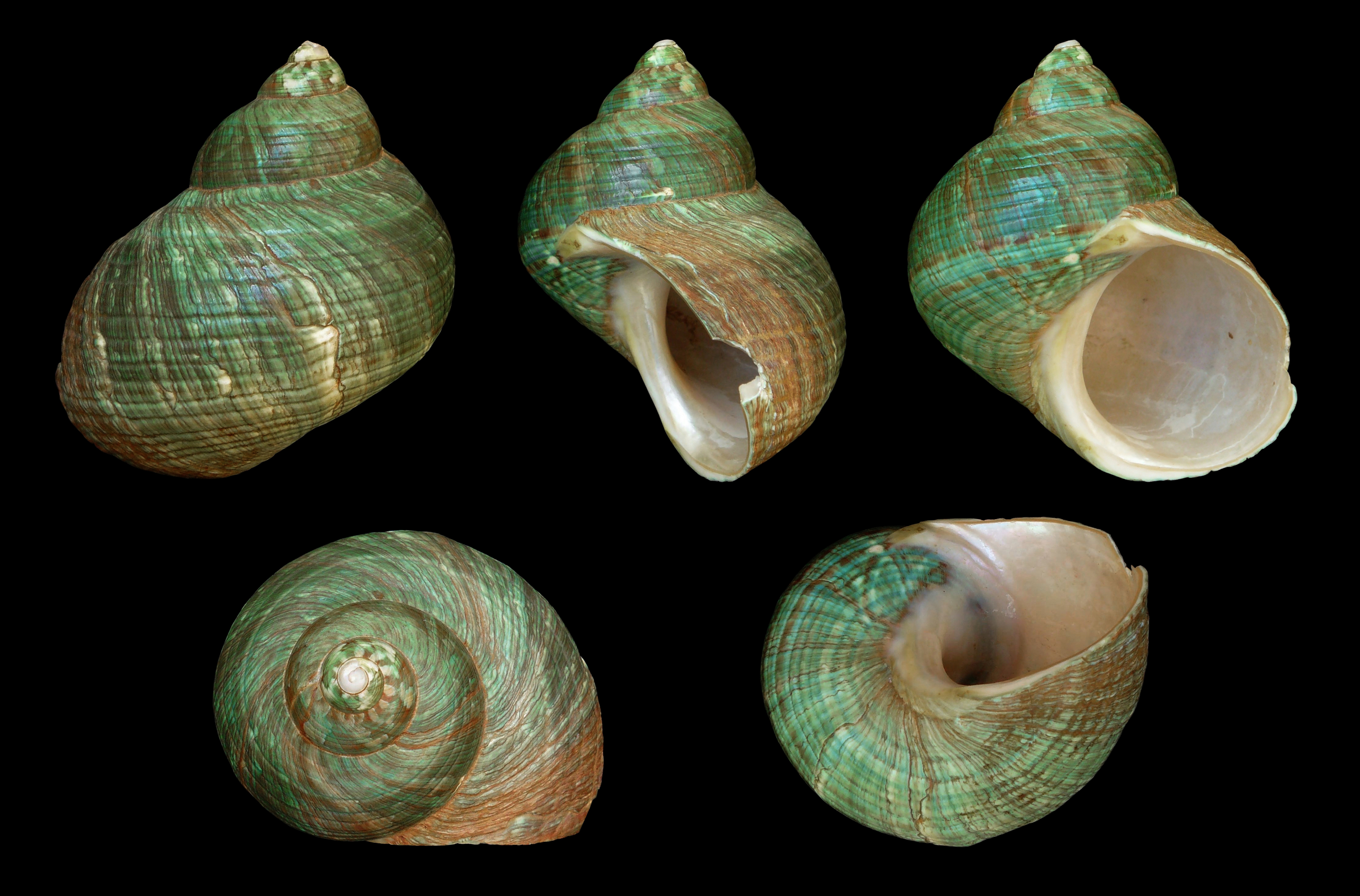
- Five views of a shell of Turbo imperialis

Scientific classification
- Kingdom: Animalia
- Phylum: Mollusca
- Class: Gastropoda
- Subclass: Vetigastropoda
- Order: Trochida
- Family: Turbinidae
- Genus: Turbo
- Species: T. imperialis

Binomial name
- Turbo imperialis Gmelin, 1790

Synonyms
- Turbo mespilus Gmelin, 1791; Turbo (Dinassovica) imperialis Gmelin, 1791; Turbo (Lunatica) imperialis Gmelin, 1791

= Turbo imperialis =

Species of gastropod

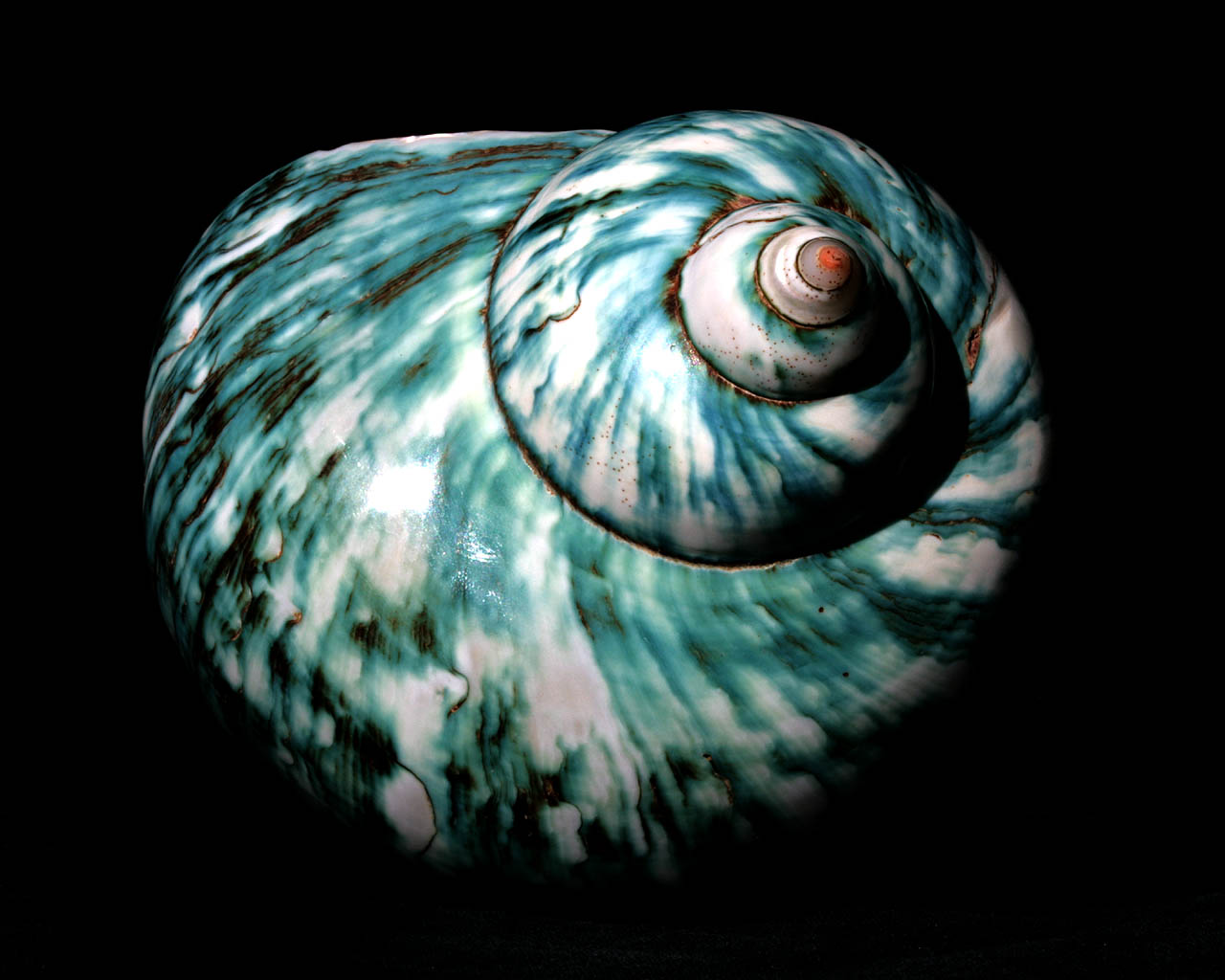
A shell of T. imperialis; sometimes incorrectly identified as T. marmoratus

Turbo imperialis is a species of sea snail, a marine gastropod mollusk in the family Turbinidae, the turban snails.

T. imperialis is fished commercially for its pearly shell, and is often confused with T. marmoratus; both species are known as "the green snail". This species is also often confused with Turbo militaris.

== Description ==
The length of the shell varies between 50 mm and 120 mm. The large, solid shell has a globose-conic shape. It is ventricose and imperforate. Its color is green, irregularly mottled and spirally striped with chestnut, closely irregularly striate with the same color. The 6-7 convex whorls show well marked sutures, and numerous more or less conspicuous revolving furrows. The large body whorl is somewhat flattened above. The aperture is subcircular and pearly white within The outer lip is rather thin. The arched columella has a pearly callus, which reappears at the posterior angle. The green parietal wall is nearly devoid of callus. The base of the shell is slightly dilated and scarcely produced.

== Distribution ==
According to the Natural History Museum, this marine species occurs off East Africa, Madagascar, Mauritius and Reunion.
