= Aboriginal Tasmanians =

Indigenous people of the Australian island state of Tasmania

Palawa / Pakana / Parlevar
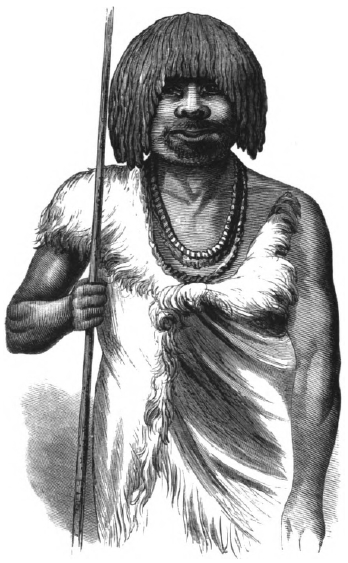
- Illustration from The Last of the Tasmanians – Woureddy, Truganini's husband

Regions with significant populations
- Tasmania: 6,000–23,572 (self-identified)

Languages
- English; Australian English; Australian Aboriginal English; Palawa kani; formerly Tasmanian languages

Religion
- Christianity; formerly Aboriginal Tasmanian religion

Related ethnic groups
- Aboriginal Australians

Aboriginal Tasmanians (palawa kani: Palawa, Pakana) are the Aboriginal people of Tasmania, a large island south of mainland Australia. Aboriginal people lived in Tasmania for tens of thousands of years before European settlement. Around 6000 BCE, rising sea levels formed Bass Strait and separated Tasmania from mainland Australia. This left the island's Aboriginal communities geographically isolated from other Aboriginal Australian groups for about 8,000 years.

Before British colonisation in 1803, Tasmanian Aboriginal communities maintained distinct languages, cultural traditions, and regional identities, and were organised into family and clan groups connected to particular territories and seasonal movement patterns. Estimates of the population before colonisation generally range from 3,000 to 15,000 people.

During the first decades of British settlement in the 19th century, Aboriginal communities in Tasmania were devastated by introduced diseases, frontier violence, dispossession, and forced removal during the Black War. Between 1830 and 1835, most surviving Aboriginal people were removed to the Wybalenna Aboriginal Establishment on Flinders Island in Bass Strait. Historians continue to debate whether these events constituted genocide under the United Nations Genocide Convention.

For much of the 19th and 20th centuries, colonial writers and popular media incorrectly described Aboriginal Tasmanians as extinct following the deaths of Truganini in 1876 and Fanny Cochrane Smith in 1905, each of whom was wrongly presented as the "last" Aboriginal Tasmanian. Tasmanian Aboriginal communities survived, particularly through descendants of Aboriginal women in Tasmania and the Bass Strait islands, and continued to maintain and revive cultural traditions and community identity.

In the 21st century, thousands of people in Tasmania identify as Aboriginal Tasmanian. Contemporary Palawa communities continue cultural revival projects, including the reconstruction and use of palawa kani, a composite Tasmanian Aboriginal language.

== Name and identity ==
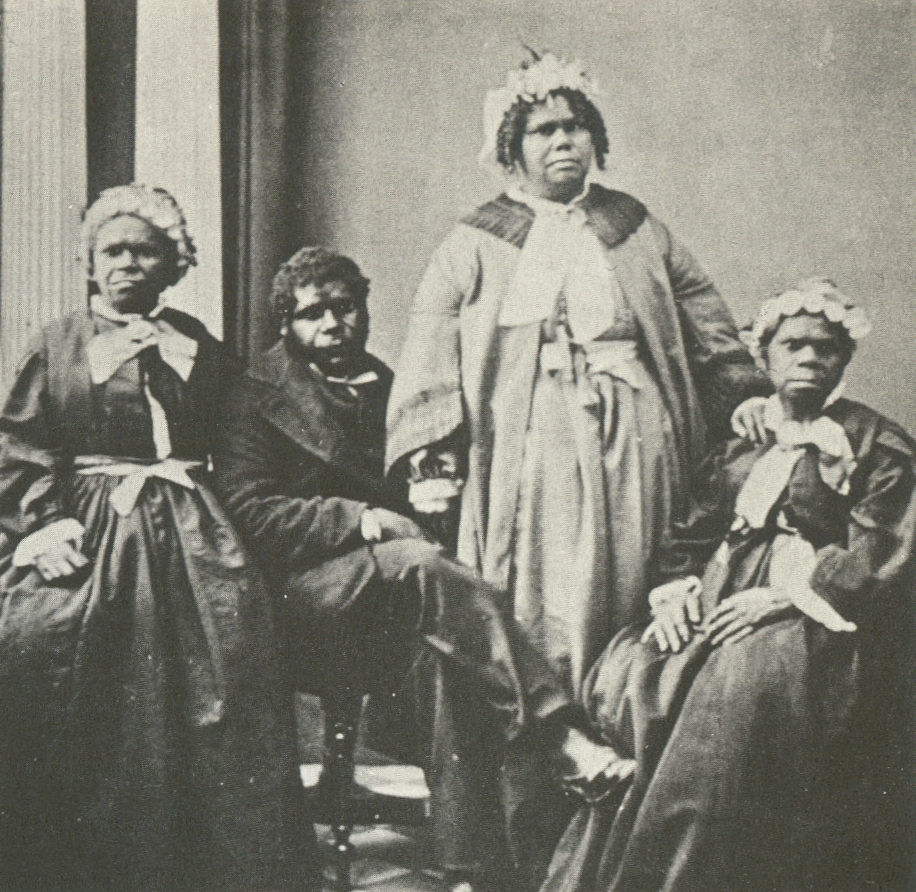
The last four Tasmanian Aboriginal people of solely Aboriginal descent, c. 1860s. Truganini, the last to survive, is seated at far right.

Aboriginal Tasmanians are the Aboriginal people of the Australian island of Tasmania, located south of the mainland.

For much of the 20th century, the Tasmanian Aboriginal people were widely and erroneously thought to be extinct and to have been intentionally exterminated by white settlers.

Since the mid-1970s, Tasmanian Aboriginal activists such as Michael Mansell have sought to broaden awareness and identification of Aboriginal descent. After campaigning by Tasmanian Aboriginal people in April 2023, UNESCO removed a document claiming they were extinct.

Figures from 2016 for the number of people of Tasmanian Aboriginal descent vary according to the criteria used to determine identity, ranging from 6,000 to more than 23,000.

A dispute exists within the Tasmanian Aboriginal community over what constitutes Aboriginality. The Palawa, mainly descendants of white male sealers and Tasmanian Aboriginal women who settled on the Bass Strait islands, were given the power to decide who is of Tasmanian Aboriginal descent at the state level, which determines entitlement to government Aboriginal services. The Palawa recognise only descendants of the Bass Strait island community as Aboriginal and do not regard the Lia Pootah, who claim descent from mainland Tasmanian Aboriginal communities on the basis of oral traditions, as Aboriginal. The Lia Pootah feel that the Palawa-controlled Tasmanian Aboriginal Centre does not represent them politically.

Since 2007, there have been initiatives to introduce DNA testing to establish family history within descendant subgroups. This is strongly opposed by the Palawa and has drawn an angry reaction from some quarters, as some have claimed a "spiritual connection" with Aboriginality distinct from, but not as important as, the existence of a genetic link. The Lia Pootah object to the current test used to prove Aboriginality, as they believe it favours the Palawa; a DNA test would circumvent barriers to Lia Pootah recognition, or disprove their claims to Aboriginality.

In April 2000, the Tasmanian Government's Legislative Council Select Committee on Aboriginal Lands discussed the difficulty of determining Aboriginality based on oral traditions. An example given by Cassandra Pybus was the claim of the Huon and Channel Aboriginal people, who had an oral history of descent from two Aboriginal women; research found that both were non-Aboriginal convict women.

== Language ==
=== Pre-contact language ===
The archaeological, geographic, and linguistic record suggests successive waves of occupation in Tasmania and the coalescence of three language groups into a single broad group. Colonial settlers found two main language and ethnic groups in Tasmania on their arrival: the western Nara and the eastern Mara. The admixture of Nara toponyms in the eastern territory of the Mara languages seems to be a relic of ancient conquests mirroring the hostilities of colonial times.

- Pleistocene Palawa language group – the first ethnic and language group in Tasmania; absorbed or displaced by successive invasions except for a remnant group on the Tasman Peninsula. Absorbed populations in eastern Tasmania combined with Victorian speakers to form the Mara language group across broader eastern Tasmania.
- Furneaux speakers displaced Palawa in north-east Tasmania as far south as Orford. They later disappeared or were absorbed into the Mara language group, a composite of Pleistocene Palawa, Furneaux, and Victorian speakers.
- Nara speakers invaded Tasmania but were later pushed back into western Tasmania. This movement has been associated with the Western Tasmanian Aboriginal people.

=== Mairremenner ===
The North Midlands language has been classified as "mairremenner". It was spoken by the Ben Lomond and North East nations, as well as by the Luggermairrernerpairrer clan of the Central Highlands. This language group is likely to have derived from three earlier Tasmanian languages.

=== Toponymy ===
Little is recorded about the toponymy of the speakers' country, but some local placenames have survived and are likely to belong to the Nara language group.

- Tamar River: kunermurluker, morerutter, ponrabbel
- Low Head: Pilerwaytackenter
- George Town area: Kennemerthertackenloongentare
- Launceston (Port Dalrymple): Taggener, Lorernulraytitteter
- North Esk River: Lakekeller
- Mount Barrow: Pialermaligena

=== Recording and loss ===
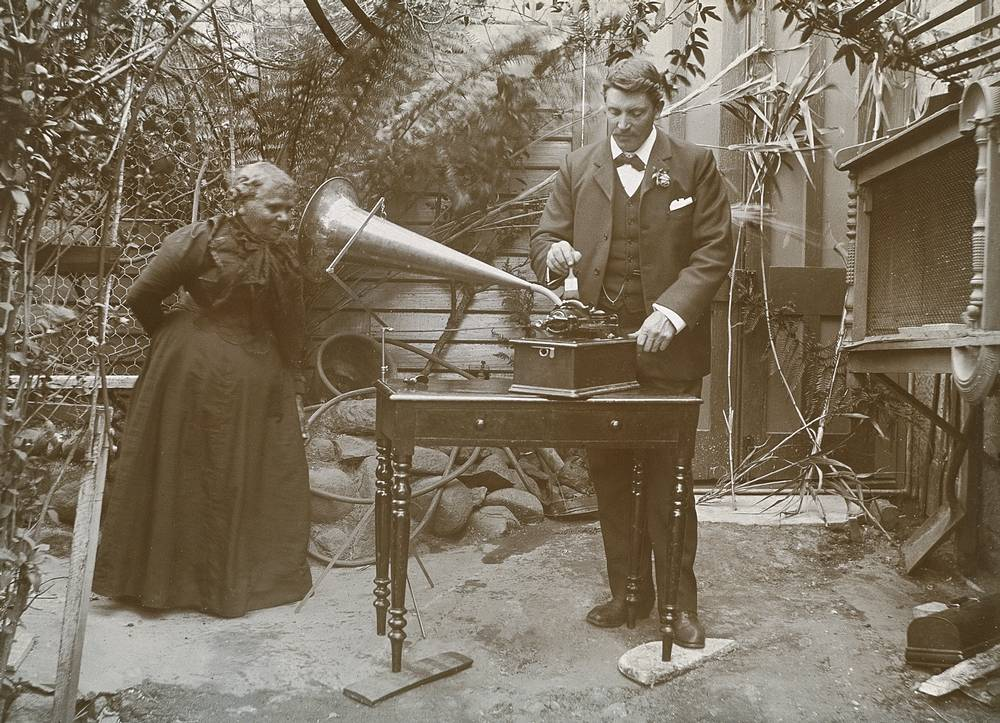
Horace Watson recording the songs of Fanny Cochrane Smith, considered to be the last fluent speaker of a Tasmanian language, 1903. Singer Bruce Watson, a descendant of Watson, composed a song about this picture and later performed it with singer Ronnie Summers, a descendant of Smith.

Much of what is known about the original Tasmanian Aboriginal languages survives through fragmentary wordlists recorded by European visitors, explorers, and colonists between the late 18th and 19th centuries. Because many languages disappeared before systematic documentation occurred, linguists disagree on the exact number and classification of Tasmanian languages. The surviving records were compiled using inconsistent spellings and transcription methods, making reconstruction difficult.

More than twenty individuals documented words and phrases during the colonial period, including English, Scottish, Danish, and French recorders.

There are no living speakers of the original Tasmanian languages. Spoken recordings are extremely rare; the best-known examples are recordings of Fanny Cochrane Smith singing traditional songs in 1899 and 1903. Smith is often described as the last fluent speaker of a Tasmanian Aboriginal language.

1903 recording of a Tasmanian language

By the late 19th century, only fragmentary records of the original languages remained. Some language groups had already been severely affected by introduced diseases before large-scale British settlement began in 1803. As Aboriginal communities were displaced and reduced in number during the colonial period, many languages disappeared before they could be properly documented.

=== Palawa kani and language revival ===
Although the original Tasmanian Aboriginal languages are no longer spoken fluently, some words survived among Palawa communities descended from Tasmanian Aboriginal women and European sealers in the Furneaux Islands.

In recent decades, efforts to reconstruct and revive elements of the languages have continued through the development of palawa kani, a reconstructed language created from surviving historical wordlists and linguistic records.

== Hunting and diet ==
Aboriginal Tasmanians were primarily nomadic people who lived in adjoining territories, moving according to seasonal changes in food supplies such as seafood, land mammals, and native vegetables and berries.

Approximately 4,000 years ago, Aboriginal Tasmanians largely dropped scaled fish from their diet and began eating more land mammals, such as possums, kangaroos, and wallabies. They had used bone tools, but appear to have switched from worked bone tools to more efficient sharpened stone tools. The significance of the disappearance of bone tools (believed to have been used primarily for fishing) and of fish from the diet is heavily debated. Some argue that it is evidence of a maladaptive society, while others argue that the change was economic, as large areas of scrub were changing to grassland at that time, providing substantially increased food resources. Fish were never a large part of the diet, ranking behind shellfish and seals, and with more resources available, the cost–benefit ratio of fishing may have become too high. Archaeological evidence indicates that around the time these changes occurred, the Tasmanian people began expanding their territories, a process that was still continuing when Europeans arrived.

== Prehistory ==
The shoreline of Tasmania and Victoria about 14,000 years ago, as sea levels were rising, showing some of the human archaeological sites – see Prehistory of Australia. For a more detailed map of the land bridge, see Hamacher et al. (2023).

Aboriginal Tasmanians crossed into what is now Tasmania approximately 35,000 years ago during the Late Pleistocene, when lower sea levels during the Last Glacial Period exposed the Bassian Plain, a broad land bridge linking Tasmania to mainland Australia.

Archaeological evidence suggests that Tasmania was colonised by successive waves of Aboriginal people from southern Australia during periods of lower sea level associated with glacial maxima. Archaeological and geographic evidence indicates that Aboriginal Tasmanians and their ancestors lived in a colder and drier environment than exists today. During glacial periods, arid conditions extended from southern Australia into the midlands of central Tasmania, interrupted by warmer and wetter intervals. People moving into Tasmania would have crossed stretches of seawater and dry country before reaching more habitable environments, including the highlands of what is now King Island in Bass Strait.

Evidence from caves and occupation sites across Tasmania demonstrates long-term Aboriginal occupation during the Pleistocene. Near present-day Hobart, the Jordan River Levee, near the Jordan River Bridge, is among the southernmost known sites of Pleistocene human habitation, with occupation dated to at least 37,000 years ago. Archaeological studies recovered an average of 100 stone tools per square metre of excavated deposit from the levee.

Excavations at Warreen Cave in south-west Tasmania demonstrated occupation from as early as 34,000 BP (approximately 32,000 BCE), making Aboriginal Tasmanians among the southernmost known human populations in the world during the Pleistocene. Archaeological investigations in south-west and central Tasmania, including the island's highland regions, also produced evidence dating from approximately 35,000 to 11,000 BP (about 33,000–9,000 BCE), providing some of the richest archaeological evidence from Pleistocene Greater Australia.

Deposits dating to approximately 19,000 years ago at Kutikina Cave (also known as Fraser Cave) in western Tasmania demonstrate continued occupation of Tasmania's highlands during the last ice age and Last Glacial Maximum. Oral traditions have also been studied alongside archaeological evidence in research into the environmental history of the Bassian Plain and the formation of Bass Strait.

Between about 14,000 and 12,000 BCE, rising sea levels submerged the Bassian Plain and formed Bass Strait, separating Tasmania from mainland Australia. Aboriginal Tasmanians remained isolated from mainland Aboriginal populations for approximately 8,000 years, until European exploration in the late 18th and early 19th centuries.

Archaeological evidence suggests that small Aboriginal Tasmanian populations living on the highlands of what are now King Island and the Furneaux Group became stranded by rising waters after the formation of Bass Strait and later died out.

== European contact ==
=== Early European contact ===
Abel Tasman, who in 1642 became the first European credited with discovering Tasmania and who named it Van Diemen's Land, did not encounter any Aboriginal Tasmanians when he landed. In 1772, a French exploratory expedition under Marc-Joseph Marion du Fresne visited Tasmania. At first, contact with the Aboriginal people was friendly; however, the Aboriginal Tasmanians became alarmed when another boat was dispatched towards the shore. It was reported that spears and stones were thrown, and the French responded with musket fire, killing at least one Aboriginal person and wounding several others. Two later French expeditions, led by Bruni d'Entrecasteaux in 1792–1793 and Nicolas Baudin in 1802, made friendly contact with the Aboriginal Tasmanians; the d'Entrecasteaux expedition did so over an extended period.

The Resolution under Captain Tobias Furneaux (part of an expedition led by Captain James Cook) visited in 1773 but made no contact with the Aboriginal Tasmanians, although gifts were left for them in unoccupied shelters found on Bruny Island. The first known British contact with the Aboriginal Tasmanians was made on Bruny Island by Cook in 1777, and was peaceful. Captain William Bligh also visited Bruny Island in 1788 and made peaceful contact with the Aboriginal Tasmanians.

=== Contact with sealers, and the formation of the Bass Strait community ===
==== Sealing in Bass Strait ====
More extensive contact between Aboriginal Tasmanians and Europeans began when British and American seal hunters started visiting the islands in Bass Strait, as well as the northern and eastern coasts of Tasmania, from the late 1790s. By about 1800, sealers were regularly left on uninhabited islands in Bass Strait during the sealing season (November to May). The sealers established semi-permanent camps or settlements on the islands, which were close enough for them to reach the main island of Tasmania in small boats and so make contact with the Aboriginal Tasmanians.

Trading relationships developed between sealers and Tasmanian Aboriginal tribes. Hunting dogs were highly prized by the Aboriginal people, as were other exotic items such as flour, tea, and tobacco, for which they traded kangaroo skins.

By 1810, seal numbers had been greatly reduced by hunting, and most seal hunters abandoned the area. About fifty sealers, mostly "renegade sailors, escaped convicts or ex-convicts", remained as permanent residents of the Bass Strait islands, and some established families with Tasmanian Aboriginal women.

==== Aboriginal women and the sealing trade ====
A trade in Aboriginal women soon developed. Many Tasmanian Aboriginal women were highly skilled in hunting seals, as well as in obtaining other foods such as seabirds, and some Tasmanian tribes would trade their services and, more rarely, those of Aboriginal men to the sealers for the seal-hunting season. Others were sold permanently. This trade involved not only women of the tribe engaged in the trade but also women abducted from other tribes. Some may have been given to incorporate the new arrivals into Aboriginal society through marriage.

Sealers raided the coasts to abduct Aboriginal women and were reported to have killed Aboriginal men in the process.

Historian James Bonwick reported Aboriginal women who were clearly captives of sealers, but he also reported women living with sealers who "proved faithful and affectionate to their new husbands", women who appeared "content", and others who were allowed to visit their "native tribe", taking gifts, with the sealers being confident that they would return.

Bonwick also reported a number of claims of brutality by sealers towards Aboriginal women, including some of those made by George Augustus Robinson. An Aboriginal woman named Bulrer told Robinson that sealers had rushed her camp and stolen six women, including herself: "the white men tie them and then they flog them very much, plenty much blood, plenty cry."

Sealing captain James Kelly wrote in 1816 that the custom of the sealers was for each to have "two to five of these native women for their own use and benefit". A shortage of women available "in trade" resulted in abduction becoming common, and in 1830 it was reported that at least fifty Aboriginal women were "kept in slavery" on the Bass Strait islands.

Harrington, a sealer, procured ten or fifteen native women, and placed them on different islands in Bass's Straits, where he left them to procure skins; if, however, when he returned, they had not obtained enough, he punished them by tying them up to trees for twenty-four to thirty-six hours together, flogging them at intervals, and he killed them not infrequently if they proved stubborn.

==== Resistance and conflict ====
Some of the women were taken back to the islands by the sealers involuntarily and some went willingly, as in the case of a woman called Tarenorerer (English name: Walyer). Accounts of Walyer's involvement with the sealers differ. Ian McFarlane writes that she voluntarily joined the sealers with members of her family and was responsible for attacking Aboriginal people and white settlers alike. Lyndall Ryan concludes instead that Walyer had been abducted at Port Sorell by Aboriginal people and traded to the sealers for dogs and flour.

Walyer later gained some notoriety for her attempts to kill the sealers to escape their brutality. A Punnilerpanner, she joined the Plairhekehillerplue band after eventually escaping and went on to lead attacks on employees of the Van Diemen's Land Company. Her attacks are the first recorded use of muskets by Aboriginal people. After her capture, she refused to work and was banished to Penguin Island. Later imprisoned on Swan Island, she attempted to organise a rebellion.

Although Aboriginal women were by custom forbidden to take part in war, several Aboriginal women who escaped from sealers became leaders or took part in attacks. According to Ryan, the women traded to or kidnapped by sealers became "a significant dissident group" against European authority.

==== Historical debate and legacy ====
There are numerous stories of the sealers' brutality towards the Aboriginal women, some of them originating from Robinson. In 1830, Robinson seized fourteen Aboriginal women from the sealers, planning for them to marry Aboriginal men at the Flinders Island settlement. Josephine Flood, an archaeologist specialising in Australian mainland Aboriginal peoples, notes: "he encountered strong resistance from the women as well as sealers".

The sealers sent a representative, James Munro, to appeal to Governor George Arthur and argue for the women's return, on the basis that they wanted to stay with their sealer husbands and children rather than marry Aboriginal men unknown to them. Arthur ordered the return of some of the women.

Shortly thereafter, Robinson began to disseminate stories, told to him by Munro, of atrocities allegedly committed by the sealers against Aboriginal people, and against Aboriginal women in particular. Brian Plomley, who edited Robinson's papers, expressed scepticism about these atrocities and noted that they were not reported to Archdeacon William Broughton's 1830 committee of inquiry into violence towards Tasmanians. Abduction and ill-treatment of Aboriginal Tasmanians certainly occurred, but the extent is debated.

The raids for and trade in Aboriginal women contributed to the rapid decline in the number of Aboriginal women in northern Tasmania – "by 1830, only three women survived in northeast Tasmania among 72 men" – and thus contributed significantly to the demise of the Tasmanian population of solely Aboriginal descent.

A community of partial Tasmanian Aboriginal descent formed on the islands, where it remains to the present, and many present-day Aboriginal Tasmanians trace their descent from the 19th-century sealer communities of Bass Strait.

== Colonisation ==
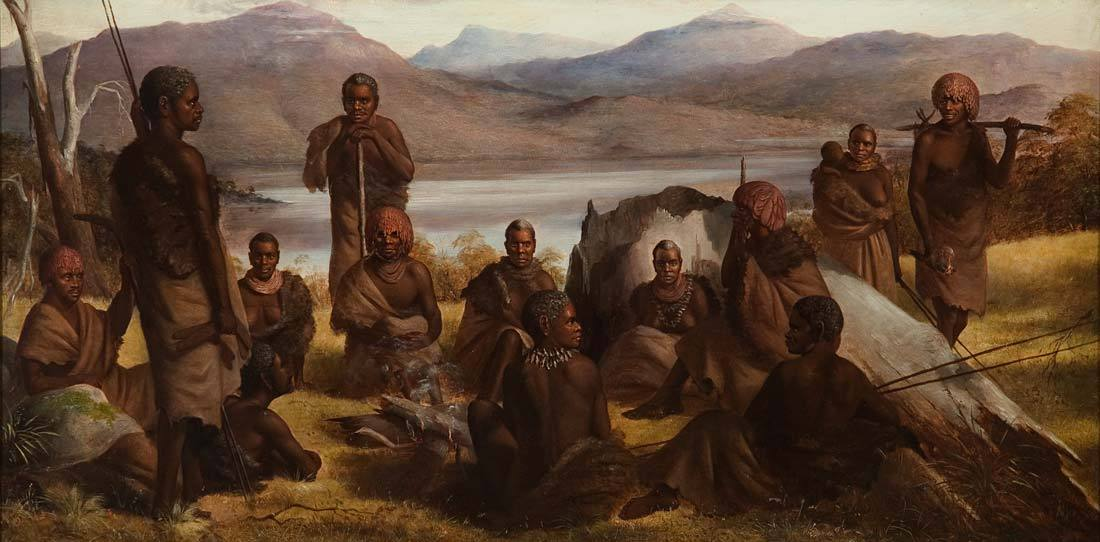
Robert Dowling, Group of Natives of Tasmania, 1859. Critic Bernard William Smith assessed the work as a "history painting in the full sense of the word", with the natives "seated – emblematic of their situation – around the dying embers of a burnt-out log near a great blackened stump, and in the far left corner there is a leafless tree with shattered branches."

=== Early British settlement and first contact (1798–1804) ===
Although commercial sealing on Van Diemen's Land had begun in late 1798, the first significant European presence on the island came in September 1803 with the establishment of a small British military outpost at Risdon Cove on the River Derwent near present-day Hobart.

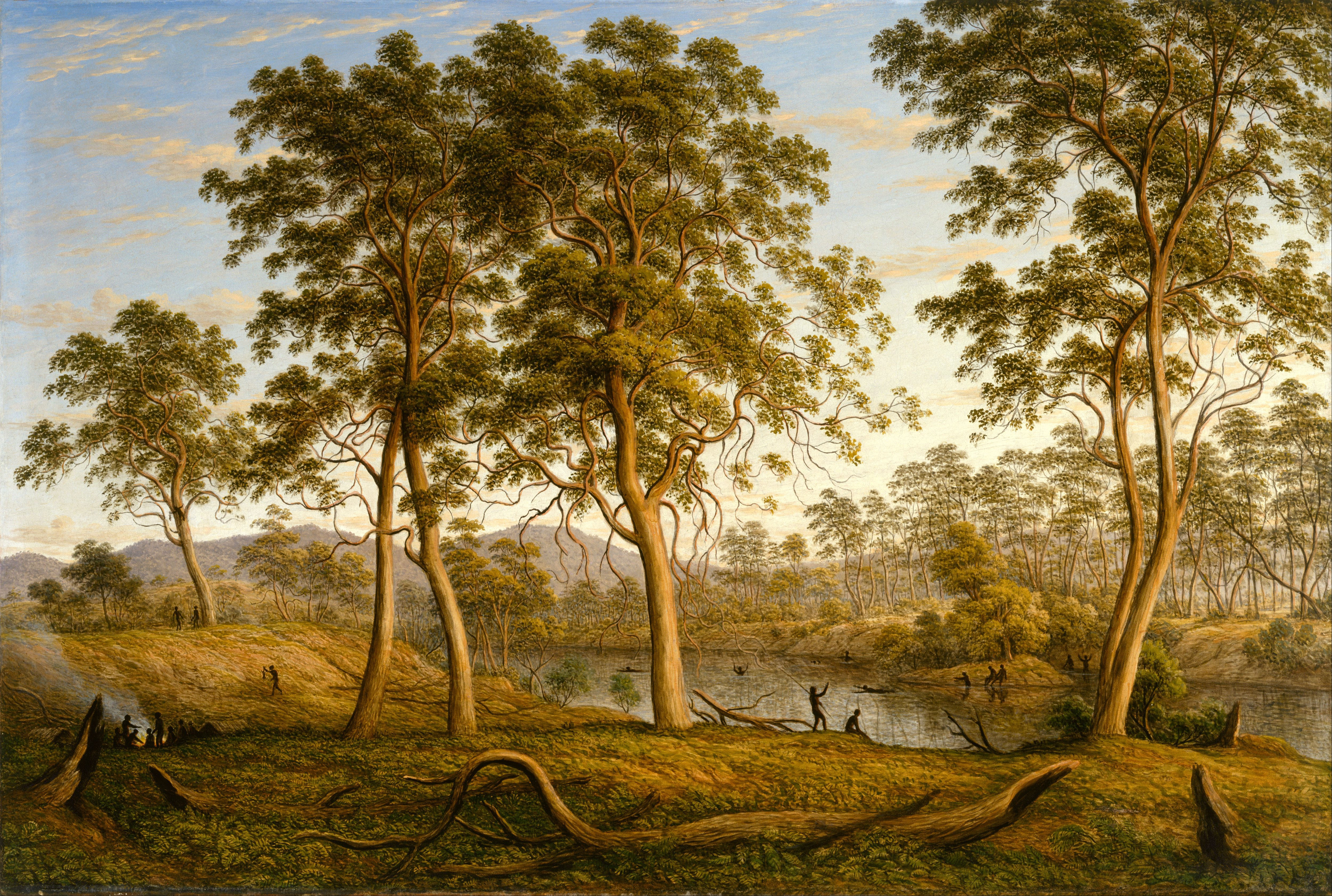
Natives on the Ouse River, Van Diemen's Land by John Glover, 1838

The British had several hostile encounters with Aboriginal clans over the next five months, in which shots were fired and an Aboriginal boy was abducted. David Collins arrived as the colony's first lieutenant governor in February 1804 with instructions from London that any acts of violence against the Aboriginal people were to be punished. However, he failed to publish those instructions, leaving the legal framework for dealing with any violent conflict unclear.

==== Risdon Cove massacre ====
On 3 May 1804, soldiers, settlers, and convicts from Risdon Cove fired on a hunting party of 100 to 300 Aboriginal people. The British commanding officer stated that he thought the Aboriginal group was hostile. Witnesses' estimates of the number of Aboriginal men, women, and children killed in the massacre ranged from three to fifty. A boy whose parents were killed in the massacre was taken and given the name Robert Hobart May. He became the first Aboriginal Tasmanian to have extended contact with British colonial society.

=== Frontier conflict and exploitation (1803–1823) ===
Between 1803 and 1823, there were two phases of conflict between the Aboriginal people and the British colonists. The first took place between 1803 and 1808 over the need for common food sources such as oysters and kangaroos. The second took place between 1808 and 1823, when only a small number of white women lived among the colonists, and farmers, sealers, and whalers took part in the trading and abduction of Aboriginal women as sexual partners. These practices also increased conflict among the men of different Aboriginal tribes, which in turn led to a decline in the Aboriginal population. Ryan records that 74 Aboriginal people (almost all women) lived with sealers on the Bass Strait islands up to 1835.

By 1816, the kidnapping of Aboriginal children for labour had become widespread. In 1814, Governor Thomas Davey issued a proclamation expressing "utter indignation and abhorrence" at the kidnapping of the children, and in 1819 Governor William Sorell not only reissued the proclamation but also ordered that those who had been taken without parental consent were to be sent to Hobart and supported at government expense. A number of young Aboriginal children were known to be living with settlers. An Irish sealer named Brien spared the life of the baby son of an Aboriginal woman he had abducted, explaining, "as [he] had stolen the dam he would keep the cub". When the child grew up, he became an invaluable assistant to Brien but was considered "no good" by his own people, as he was brought up to dislike Aboriginal people, whom he considered "dirty lazy brutes". Twenty-six children are known from baptismal records to have been taken into settlers' homes as infants or very small children, too young to be of service as labourers. Some Aboriginal children were sent to the Orphan School in Hobart. Ryan reports fifty-eight Aboriginal people, of various ages, living with settlers in Tasmania in the period up to 1835.

=== Disease and population decline ===
Some historians argue that European disease does not appear to have been a serious factor until after 1829. Other historians, including Geoffrey Blainey and Keith Windschuttle, point to introduced disease as the main cause of the destruction of the Tasmanian population of solely Aboriginal descent. Windschuttle argues that while smallpox never reached Tasmania, respiratory diseases such as influenza, pneumonia, and tuberculosis, and the effects of venereal diseases, devastated the Tasmanian Aboriginal population, whose long isolation from contact with the mainland compromised their resistance to introduced disease. The work of Bonwick and the anthropologist Henry Ling Roth, both writing in the 19th century, also points to the significant role of epidemics and infertility, without clearly attributing the diseases to contact with Europeans; Bonwick noted that Tasmanian Aboriginal women were infected with venereal diseases by Europeans. Introduced venereal disease not only directly caused deaths but, more insidiously, left a significant percentage of the population unable to reproduce. Flood wrote: "Venereal disease sterilised and chest complaints – influenza, pneumonia and tuberculosis – killed."

Bonwick, who lived in Tasmania, recorded a number of reports of the devastating effect of introduced disease, including one by a Doctor Story, a Quaker, who wrote: "After 1823, the women along with the tribe seemed to have had no children; but why I do not know." Later historians have reported that introduced venereal disease caused infertility among the Aboriginal Tasmanians. Bonwick also recorded a strong Aboriginal oral tradition of an epidemic even before formal colonisation in 1803: "Mr Robert Clark, in a letter to me, said: 'I have gleaned from some of the Aborigines, now in their graves, that they were more numerous than the white people were aware of, but their numbers were very much thinned by a sudden attack of disease which was general among the entire population previous to the arrival of the English, entire tribes of natives having been swept off in the course of one or two days' illness.'" Such an epidemic may be linked to contact with sailors or sealers.

=== Calder and Robinson's observations ===
Roth wrote: "Calder, who has gone more fully into the particulars of their illnesses, writes as follows ...: 'Their rapid declension after the colony was founded is traceable, as far as our proofs allow us to judge, to the prevalence of epidemic disorders.'" Roth was referring to James Erskine Calder, who took up a post as a surveyor in Tasmania in 1829 and wrote a number of scholarly papers about the Aboriginal people. Roth continued: "According to Calder, a rapid and remarkable declension of the numbers of the Aborigines had been going on long before the remnants were gathered together on Flinders Island. Whole tribes (some of which Robinson mentions by name as being in existence fifteen or twenty years before he went amongst them, and which probably never had a shot fired at them) had absolutely and entirely vanished. To the causes to which he attributes this strange wasting away ... I think infecundity, produced by the infidelity of the women to their husbands in the early times of the colony, may be safely added ... Robinson always enumerates the sexes of the individuals he took; ... and as a general thing, found scarcely any children amongst them; ... adultness was found to outweigh infancy everywhere in a remarkable degree ..."

Robinson recorded in his journals a number of comments regarding the Aboriginal Tasmanians' susceptibility to diseases, particularly respiratory diseases. In 1832, he revisited the west coast of Tasmania, far from the settled regions, and wrote: "The numbers of Aborigines along the western coast have been considerably reduced since the time of my last visit [1830]. A mortality has raged amongst them which together with the severity of the season and other causes had rendered the paucity of their number very considerable." (Note: Robinson writing to Edward Curr, 22 September 1832.)

=== Escalation into frontier war (1824–1832) ===
Between 1825 and 1831, the colonists identified a pattern of guerrilla warfare by the Aboriginal Tasmanians. Rapid pastoral expansion, a depletion of native game, and an increase in the colony's population triggered Aboriginal resistance from 1824 onwards, when, Ryan estimates, 1,000 Aboriginal people remained in the settled districts. Whereas settlers and stock keepers had previously provided rations to the Aboriginal people during their seasonal movements across the settled districts, and recognised this practice as a form of payment for trespass and loss of traditional hunting grounds, the new settlers and stock keepers were unwilling to maintain these arrangements, and the Aboriginal people began to raid settlers' huts for food.

The official government position was that Aboriginal people were blameless for any hostilities, but when Musquito was hanged in 1825, the hanging generated a significant debate that split the colonists along class lines. The "higher grade" saw the hanging as a dangerous precedent and argued that Aboriginal people were only defending their land and should not be punished for doing so. The "lower grade" of colonists wanted more Aboriginal people hanged to encourage a "conciliatory line of conduct". Governor Arthur sided with the "lower grade", and 1825 saw the first official acceptance that Aboriginal people were at least partly to blame for conflict.

=== Martial law and the Black War ===
In 1826, the government gazette, which had formerly reported "retaliatory actions" by Aboriginal people, began to report "acts of atrocity" and for the first time used the term "Aborigine" instead of "native". A newspaper reported that there were only two solutions to the problem: either they should be "hunted down like wild beasts and destroyed", or they should be removed from the settled districts. The colonial government assigned troops to drive them out. A royal proclamation in 1828 established military posts on the boundaries, and a further proclamation declared martial law against the Aboriginal people. As it was recognised that there were fixed routes for seasonal migration, Aboriginal people were required to have passes if they needed to cross the settled districts, and bounties were offered for the capture of those without passes: £5 (equivalent to about £470 or AU$880 in 2025) for an adult and £2 for a child. This often led to organised hunts resulting in deaths. Every dispatch from Governor Arthur to the Secretary of State during this period stressed that in every case where Aboriginal people had been killed, it was colonists who initiated hostilities.

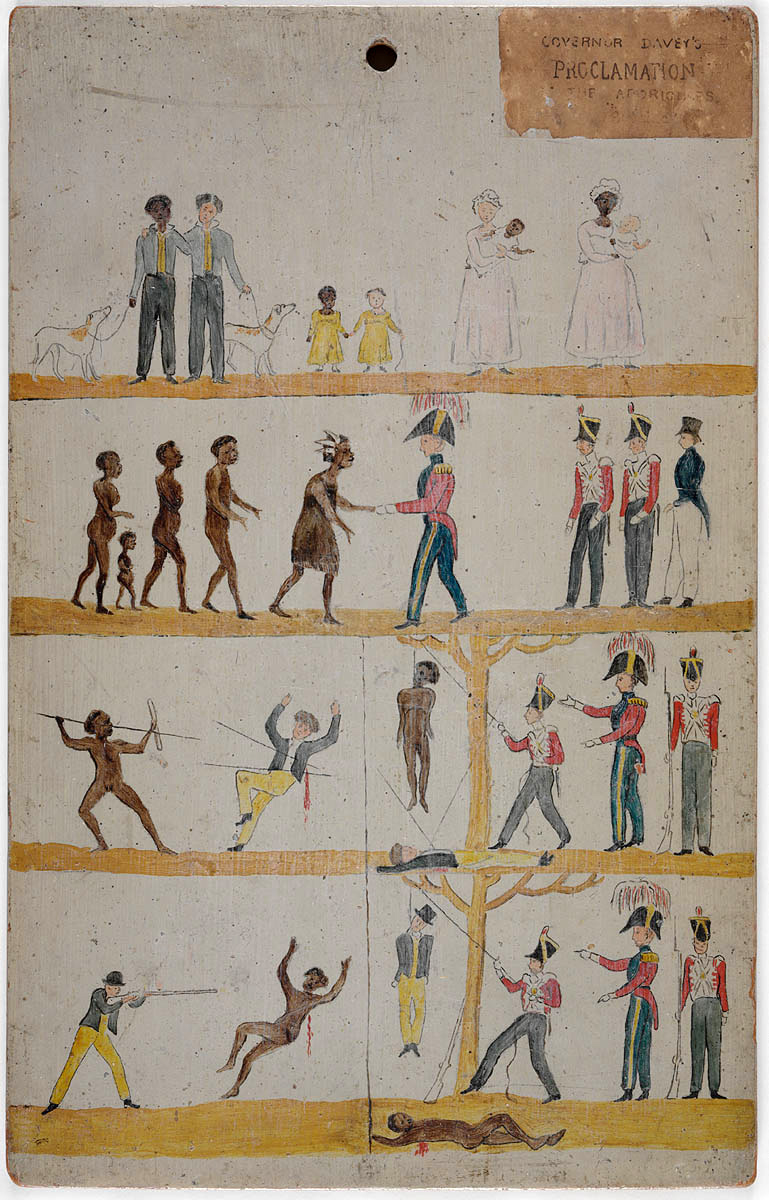
Proclamation (c. 1828 – c. 1830) by Sir George Arthur to Aboriginal Tasmanians, claiming that they would receive equal treatment before the law

Though many Aboriginal deaths went unrecorded, the Cape Grim massacre in 1828 demonstrates the level of frontier violence towards Aboriginal Tasmanians.

The Black War of 1828–1832 and the Black Line of 1830 were turning points in the relationship with European settlers. Even though many of the Aboriginal people managed to avoid capture during these events, they were shaken by the size of the campaigns against them, which left them willing to surrender to Robinson and move to Flinders Island.

=== Aboriginal Tasmanians and settlers mentioned in literature 1800–1835 ===
The figures for European casualties and for Aboriginal people captured may be considered reasonably accurate. The figure for Aboriginal people shot is likely a substantial undercount.

Tribe	Captured	Shot	Settlers killed
Oyster Bay	27	67	50
North East	12	43	7
North	28	80	15
Big River	31	43	60
North Midlands	23	38	26
Ben Lomond	35	31	20
North West	96	59	3
South West Coast	47	0	0
South East	14	1	2
Total	313	362	183

=== Settlement conditions on Flinders Island ===
In late 1831, Robinson brought the first 51 Aboriginal people to a settlement on Flinders Island called The Lagoons, which proved inadequate because it was exposed to gales, had little water, and had no land suitable for cultivation. (Note: The Lagoons was located on a narrow sandbank, covered with ferns and scrub. It was bounded on one side by the sea, and on the other side by a saltwater lagoon bordered with thick tea-tree, which cut off access to the main island.)

Supplies to the settlement were inadequate, and if sealers had not supplied potatoes, the Aboriginal people would have starved. The Europeans were living on oatmeal and potatoes, while the Aboriginal people, who detested oatmeal and refused to eat it, survived on potatoes and rice supplemented by mutton birds they caught. Within months, 31 Aboriginal people had died. Roth wrote:

They were lodged at night in shelters or "breakwinds." These "breakwinds" were thatched roofs sloping to the ground, with an opening at the top to let out the smoke and closed at the ends, except for a doorway. They were twenty feet long by ten feet wide. In each of these from twenty to thirty blacks were lodged ... To savages accustomed to sleep naked in the open air beneath the rudest shelter, the change to close and heated dwellings tended to make them susceptible, as they had never been in their wild state, to chills from atmospheric changes, and was only too well calculated to induce those severe pulmonary diseases which were destined to prove so fatal to them. The same may be said of the use of clothes ... At the settlement, they were compelled to wear clothes, which they threw off when heated or found troublesome, and when wet by rain, allowed them to dry on their bodies. In the case of Tasmanians, as with other wild tribes accustomed to going naked, the use of clothes had a most mischievous effect on their health.

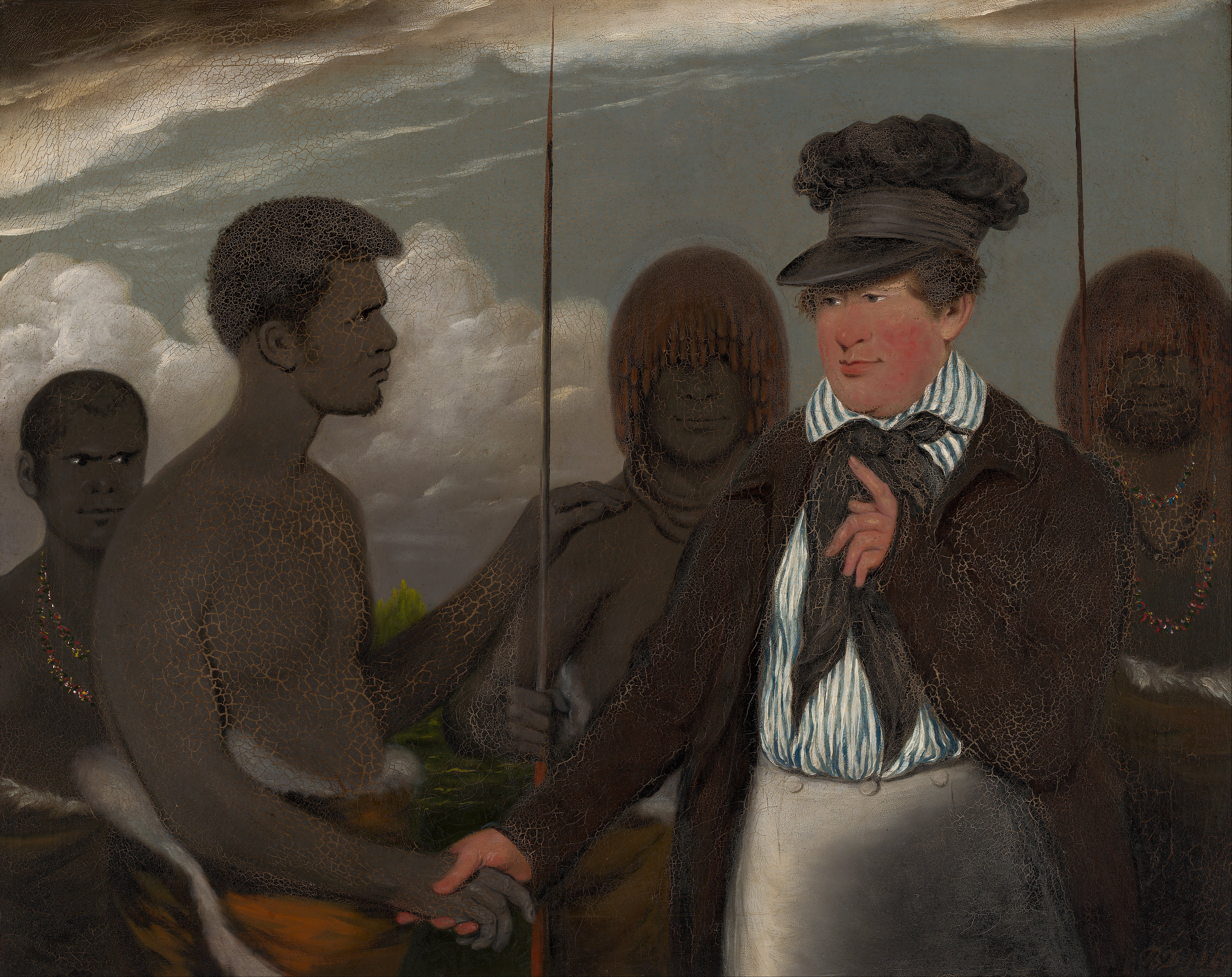
Benjamin Duterrau, Mr Robinson's first interview with Timmy, 1840

By January 1832, a further 44 captured Aboriginal people had arrived, and conflicts arose between the tribal groups. To defuse the situation, Sergeant Wight took the Big River group to Green Island, where they were abandoned, and he later decided to move the rest to Green Island as well. Two weeks later, Robinson arrived with Lieutenant Darling, the new station commander, and moved the Aboriginal people back to The Lagoons. Darling ensured a plentiful supply of food and permitted "hunting excursions".

In October 1832, it was decided to build a new camp with better buildings (wattle and daub) at a more suitable location, Pea Jacket Point. Pea Jacket Point was renamed Civilisation Point but became more commonly known as the Wybalenna Aboriginal Establishment. "Wybalenna" meant "dwellings" in the Ben Lomond language but is generally translated as "black man's houses".

Robinson befriended Truganini, learned some of the local language, and in 1833 managed to persuade the remaining 154 "full-blooded" people to move to the new settlement on Flinders Island, promising a modern and comfortable environment and that they would be returned to their former homes on the Tasmanian mainland as soon as possible.

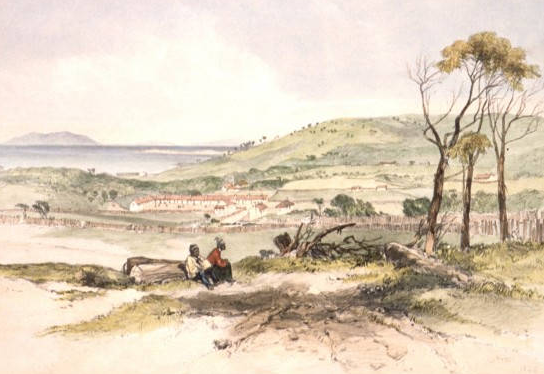
1846 painting of the Wybalenna Aboriginal Establishment

At Wybalenna, described by historian Henry Reynolds as the "best equipped and most lavishly staffed Aboriginal institution in the Australian colonies in the nineteenth century", they were provided with housing, clothing, food rations, the services of a doctor, and educational facilities.

By 1835, living conditions had deteriorated to such an extent that in October Robinson personally took charge of Wybalenna, organising better food and improving the housing. However, of the 220 who arrived with Robinson, most died in the following 14 years from introduced disease and inadequate shelter. As a result of their loss of freedom, the birth rate was extremely low, and few children survived infancy.

=== Administration and control ===
After arrival, all Aboriginal children aged between 6 and 15 were removed from their families to be brought up by the storekeeper and a lay preacher.

Convicts were assigned to build housing and do most of the work at the settlement, including growing food in the vegetable gardens. (Note: Flood cites Henry Reynolds.)

In 1839, Governor Franklin appointed a board to inquire into conditions at Wybalenna; it rejected Robinson's claims of improved living conditions and found the settlement a failure. The report was never released, and the government continued to promote Wybalenna as a success in the treatment of Aboriginal people.

=== Resistance and autonomy ===
The Aboriginal people were free to roam the island and were often absent from the settlement for extended periods on hunting trips, because the rations supplied were inadequate.

In March 1847, six Aboriginal people at Wybalenna presented a petition to Queen Victoria, the first petition to a reigning monarch from any Aboriginal group in Australia, requesting that the promises made to them be honoured. (Note: Since the 1980s, this petition has been the focus of a major argument in the legal battle regarding the promises that Robinson and Governor Arthur made to Aboriginal Tasmanians.)

According to the guards, the Aboriginal people developed "too much independence" by trying to continue their culture, which the guards considered "recklessness" and "rank ingratitude".

=== Decline and legacy ===
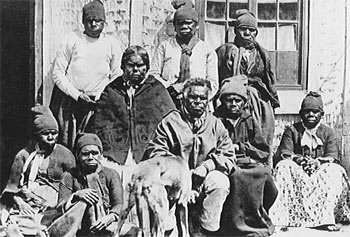
Oyster Cove Mob

In October 1847, the 47 survivors were transferred to their final settlement at Oyster Cove station. Only 44 survived the trip (11 couples, 12 single men, and 10 children), and the children were immediately sent to the orphan school in Hobart.

Although the housing and food were better than at Wybalenna, the station was a former convict station that had been abandoned earlier that year due to health issues, as it was located on inadequately drained mudflats.

Their numbers continued to diminish: there were an estimated dozen in 1859, and by 1869 only one remained, who died in 1876.

Commenting in 1899 on Robinson's claims of success, Roth wrote:

While Robinson and others were doing their best to make them into a civilised people, the poor blacks had given up the struggle, and were solving the difficult problem by dying. The very efforts made for their welfare only served to hasten on their inevitable doom. The white man's civilisation proved scarcely less fatal than the white man's musket.

== Nations ==
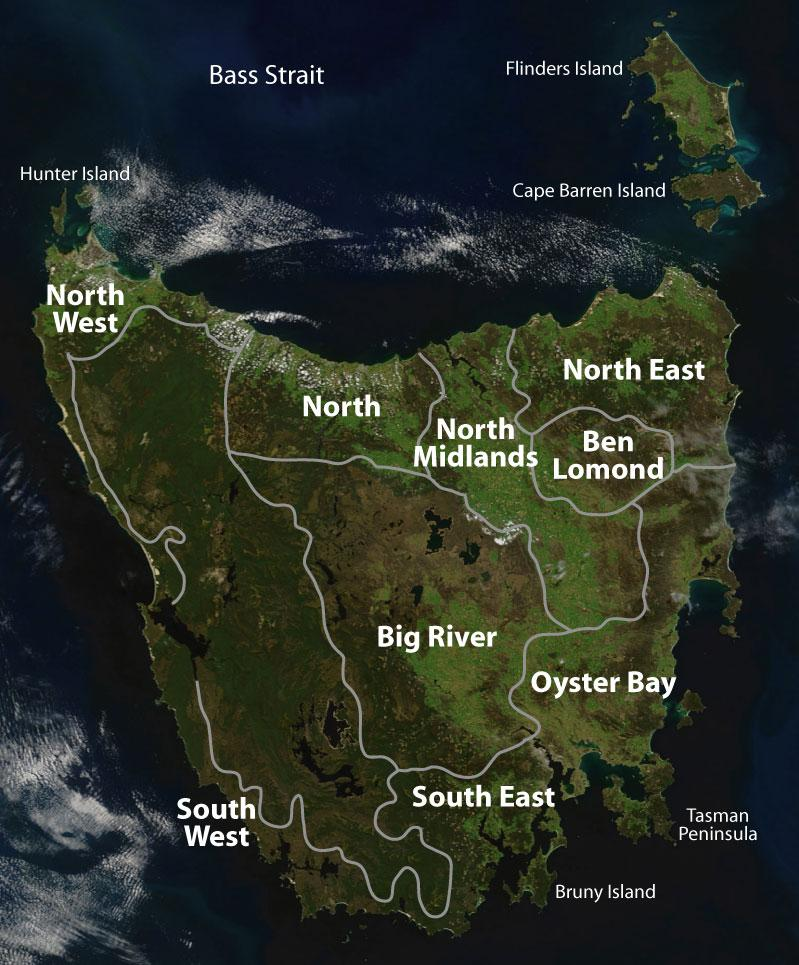
Tasmanian nations

=== Social and political organisation ===
The social organisation of Aboriginal Tasmanians had at least two levels: the domestic unit, or family group, and the social unit, or clan, which had a self-defining name and comprised 40 to 50 people.

Whether there was a larger political organisation, described as a "tribe" in the literature and by colonial observers, is contentious, as there is no evidence in the historical literature of political entities above the level of the clan. Robinson, who gathered ethnographic data in the early 19th century, described Aboriginal political groups at the clan level only.

Nevertheless, clans that shared a geographic region and language group are now usually classified by modern ethnographers as a nation, the Palawa.

According to Ryan, the population of Tasmania was organised into nine nations, each composed of six to fifteen clans, and each clan comprised two to six related extended family units. Individual clans ranged within a defined nation boundary, with elaborate rites of entry required of visitors.

There were more than 60 clans before European colonisation, although only 48 have been located and associated with particular territories. They socialised, intermarried, and fought "wars" against other clans.

=== Population ===
Estimates of the combined population of Aboriginal people in Tasmania before European arrival range from 3,000 to 15,000.

Genetic studies have suggested much higher figures, which is supported by oral traditions that Aboriginal people were "more numerous than the white people were aware of" but that their population had been greatly reduced by a sudden outbreak of disease before 1803.

It is speculated that early contacts with sealers before colonisation had resulted in an epidemic. Using archaeological evidence, Stockton (1983, p. 68) estimated a population of 3,000 to 6,000 for the northern half of the west coast alone, or up to six times the commonly accepted estimate. He later revised this to 3,000 to 5,000 for the entire island, based on historical sources.

The low rate of genetic drift indicates that Stockton's original maximum estimate is likely the lower boundary and, while not indicated by the archaeological record, a population as high as 100,000 can "not be rejected out of hand".

This is supported by carrying capacity data indicating greater resource productivity in Tasmania than on the mainland.

== Territory and significant sites ==
The locations and migratory patterns discussed below are based on the work of Jones (cited in Tindale).

Ryan used Jones's work in her history of Aboriginal Tasmanians, but Taylor notes in his thesis that Jones's original work is uncited and possibly conjectural.

Moreover, Jones published his work without recourse to Plomley's later extensive descriptions of Tasmanian Aboriginal clan groups.

Given this, the clan boundaries and nomadic patterns discussed below should be treated with caution unless supported by primary documents.

=== Letteremairrener ===
Little is known of specific sites of significance to the Letteremairrener, but contemporary Palawa regard the Cataract Gorge as a place of ceremony and significance. In 1847, when a surviving Aboriginal "chief" was temporarily returned to Launceston from exile at Wybalenna, he asked to be taken to the Cataract Gorge and was described as jubilant at his return to the gorge, and then as apparently lamenting what had been lost to him. There are no recorded significant archaeological remains in the gorge precinct, although the area was subject to significant seasonal flooding before damming.

The Letteremairrener are recorded as having specific meeting places at Paterson's Plains (near modern-day St Leonards), and groups as large as 150 were recorded in this vicinity in colonial times. The clan country overlapped with that of the Panninher and Tyerrernotepanner, and it is likely that, at times, the clans shared resources across clan borders.

=== North Midlands nation ===
The North Midlands nation was circumscribed by the valley's geographical constraints. To the west, the nation was bounded by the escarpment of the Great Western Tiers. To the north-east, the boundaries are less certain: the eastern Tamar appears to have been occupied by the Letteremairrener as far east as Piper's River, where the Poremairrenerner clan of the North East nation was resident. The occupation of the western Tamar is open to dispute – the ethnographic record suggests that it was the province of the Pallittorre and Parnillerpanner clans of the North nation, or the Letteremairrener, or a hitherto unnamed clan of the North Midlands nation. It is likely that the west Tamar valley or the Meander River valley formed the north-north-western boundary of the North Midlands nation, with the arc of highlands formed by Cluan Tier and Drys Bluff marking the north-western extremity of their country. To the east, the natural boundary was the South Esk River and, running northwards, the high tier of Mount Barrow, Mount Arthur, and the Tippogoree Hills, beyond which lay the North East nation. South of the eastern bend of the South Esk, the North Midlands nation appears to have held some land along the south bank of the river, at least as far as Avoca and possibly as far as the natural boundary of the St Pauls River, beyond which the Oyster Bay nation was resident. To the south, their country was constrained by the uplands beyond Tunbridge, as the plains narrowed towards Big River and Oyster Bay country.

=== North Midlands ===
The North Midlands nation occupied the Midland plains, a major geographical area formed in a horst and graben valley that had earlier been subject to major freshwater lacustrine inundation. The result was a relatively flat and fertile landscape that supported a large biomass and was a major food source for the Aboriginal peoples.

=== Letteremairrener "Port Dalrymple" clan ===
The Letteremairrener (Letter-ramare-ru-nah) clan occupied the country from Low Head to modern-day Launceston. In colonial times, clusters of up to ten huts were reported in the Tamar Valley, and there are extensive archaeological remains of occupation on both sides of the Tamar River and in the north coastal country.

=== Big River ===
While little is known with certainty about seasonal movements, historical accounts indicate that several Big River clans travelled eastward through Oyster Bay territory along the River Derwent to reach coastal camps near Pitt Water. Reciprocal movement rights between Big River and Oyster Bay peoples are also recorded, reflecting shared access arrangements rather than rigid territorial boundaries.

The Big River people are an Aboriginal group described in early colonial and ethnographic sources as associated with the Central Highlands and upper river systems of central Tasmania, including the Ouse, Clyde, and Dee rivers.

=== North ===
Their country contained the most important ochre mines in Tasmania, accessed by well-defined roads kept open by firing. They traded the ochre with nearby clanspeople. They would spend part of the year in the country of the North West nation to hunt seals and collect shells from Robbins Island for necklaces. In return, the North West nation had free access to the ochre mines.

Relatively isolated, the region was first explored by Europeans in 1824, when the Van Diemen's Land Company was granted 250,000 acres (100,000 ha), including the greater part of the clan's hunting grounds. The settlement was a failure: the inland areas were described as "wet, cold and soggy", while the coastal region was difficult to clear; Superintendent Henry Hellyer noted that the "forest [was] altogether unlike anything I have seen in the Island". However, in 1827, a port was established at Emu Bay. In 1828, Tarenorerer (English name: Walyer), a woman who had escaped from sealers, became the leader of the Emu Bay people and attacked the settlers with stolen weapons, the first recorded use of muskets by Aboriginal people.

=== Panninher "Pennyroyal Creek" clan ===
The Panninher (parn-in-her) were known to colonial people as the Pennyroyal Creek tribe, named after the river that flows from the Western Tiers south of Drys Bluff (now called the Liffey River). The Panninher called the Liffey River tellerpanger, and Drys Bluff, the mountain rising above their homeland, taytitkekitheker. Their territory broadly covered the north plains of the Midlands, from the west bank of the Tamar River across to what is now Evandale, and terminated at the Tyerrernotepanner country around modern-day Conara.

The Panninher also moved freely from the Tamar to the Central Highlands and brokered trade in ochre from the Toolumbunner mine to neighbouring clans. Robinson describes the road used by the Panninher from their home up to the Central Highlands, via the gully of the Liffey River, and the south road along the base of the Western Tiers and up the Lake River to modern-day Interlaken.

Although sites of ritual significance to the Panninher are not known, they are known to have frequented Native Point, on the South Esk River between modern-day Perth and Evandale, where flint quarries were located and clans met for celebration. Local historians believe that hollowed "cemetery" trees were used there to inter the dead. Similarly, Reibey's Ford, near modern-day Hadspen, was a known "resort of the natives", who called the site moorronnoe. Archaeological evidence also indicates continuous occupation at permanent lagoons near Cleveland, which was known historically as a clan meeting place.

The Panninher were affected early by settlement around Norfolk Plains. Aggressive assertion of property rights by settlers at first hindered their hunting and migration through their country and subsequently led to outright hostility from both parties. Captain Ritchie, an early settler near Perth, tolerated or fostered forays by his assigned men against the Panninher, culminating in a massacre by settlers near modern-day Cressy. The Panninher, or their neighbouring clansmen, retaliated in various attacks against settlers at Western Lagoon and in remote country up the Lake River, with aggression against the colonists reaching a peak by 1827. In 1831, a war party of "100 or 150 stout men" attacked settlers at the base of the Western Tiers and up the Lake River, but it is unclear whether this was the action of the Panninher alone or of a confederation of warriors from remnant northern Tasmanian nations. The colonial settlers made little distinction between the Panninher and members of the "Stony Creek tribe", and it is likely that the North Midlands nation had disintegrated by this time, with the amalgamated band known under the overarching name of the "Stony Creek tribe". Nevertheless, the Panninher appear to have been resourceful enough to survive in some numbers until late in the Black War.

=== Oyster Bay (Paredarerme) ===
The Paredarerme nation had good relations with the Big River nation, with large gatherings at favoured hunting sites inland and on the coast. Relations with the North Midlands nation were mostly hostile, and evidence suggests that the Douglas-Apsley region may have been a dangerous borderland that was rarely visited (Ferguson 1986 p. 22).

Generally, the clans of the Paredarerme ranged inland to the high country for spring and summer and returned to the coast for autumn and winter, but not everyone left their territory each year; some stayed by the coast. Migrations provided a varied diet, with plentiful seafood, seals, and birds on the coast, and good hunting for kangaroos, wallabies, and possums inland. The high country also provided opportunities to trade for ochre with the North West and North peoples, and to harvest intoxicating gum from Eucalyptus gunnii, found only on the plateau. The key determinant of camp sites was topography. Most camps were along river valleys, on adjacent north-facing hill slopes, and on gentle slopes bordering a forest or marsh (Brown 1986).

=== The Tyerrernotepanner "Stony Creek" clan ===
The Tyerrernotepanner clan was centred at Campbell Town and was one of up to four clans in the south-central Midlands. Nevertheless, this clan name is now used as a general term for all Aboriginal peoples of the region. The ethnographic and archaeological evidence identifies areas of significance to the south-central Midlands clans: modern-day Lake Leake, Tooms Lake, Windfalls farm, Mount Morriston, Ross township, and the lacustrine regions of the Midlands all show evidence of tool knapping and middens, and there are records of hut construction consistent with occupation.

Lake Leake (previously Kearney's Bogs), Campbell Town, Ellinthorpe Plains (near modern-day Auburn), and Tooms Lake were described as "resorts of the natives" by settlers and showed substantial evidence of seasonal occupation. Several small lagoons in the Midlands also show substantial archaeological evidence of regular occupation, consistent with tool-making and semi-nomadic use. Aboriginal roads, markenner, are described as passing up the Eastern Tiers to Swanport, up the Western Tiers to Interlaken, and up the Lake River to Woods Lake and thence to the Central Highlands.

=== Ben Lomond ===
The Ben Lomond nation occupied the 260 km^{2} of country surrounding the Ben Lomond plateau.

The Plangermaireener clan is recorded as inhabiting the south-eastern part of the Ben Lomond region and has also been associated with the Oyster Bay or Cape Portland clans to the east; the chief Mannalargenna is variously described as a chief of the Oyster Bay, Cape Portland, and Ben Lomond nations. Plangermaireener is also used as a blanket term for the Ben Lomond nation, reflecting the suffix "mairreener", meaning "people".

The Plindermairhemener are recorded in association with the south and south-western parts of the region. The location of the Tonenerweenerlarmenne is uncertain, but they were probably centred in the remaining Ben Lomond nation territory, from White Hills to the headwaters of the North Esk and South Esk rivers or the upper South Esk valley. Nevertheless, the Palawa were a nomadic people and likely occupied these lands seasonally.

The clans of the Ben Lomond nation were nomadic and hunted along the valleys of the South Esk and North Esk rivers and their tributaries and in the highlands to the north-east, as well as making forays to the plateau in summer. There are records of Aboriginal huts or dwellings around the foothills of Stacks Bluff and around the headwaters of the South Esk River near modern-day Mathinna. On the plateau, artefacts found around Lake Youl suggest regular occupation of the site by Aboriginal peoples after the last ice age. The clans of the Ben Lomond nation had close enough relationships with neighbouring clans of the East Coast and North Midlands that they enjoyed seasonal foraging rights to these adjoining territories. John Batman described the seasonal movement of the Plangermaireener in his diary of May 1830:

... the tribe travels around Ben Lomond from South Esk to North Esk – and from thence to St. Patricks Head – Georges Bay and round the East Coast

Batman further described the relationship between the clans of the Ben Lomond nation and the North East nation:

... there is [sic] two tribes ... they [the 'chiefs'] are upon friendly terms and often stop and meet and talk 10 days together ...

=== North West ===
The North West nation had good relations with the North nation, who were allowed access to the resources of the north-west coast. First explored by Europeans in 1824, the region was considered inhospitable and only lightly settled, although it suffered a high rate of Aboriginal dispossession and killings.

=== South East ===
The first European settlement in Tasmania, at Risdon Cove, was established on land belonging to the Aboriginal people of the South East region. The region contained some of Tasmania's most important mining sites for materials such as silcrete, chert, and quartzite.

The South East people are recorded as having a hostile relationship with the Oyster Bay nation to their north, including raids that reportedly involved the abduction of women.

== Clans ==
=== Oyster Bay (Paredarerme) ===
The Paredarerme is estimated to have been the largest Tasmanian nation, with ten clans totalling 700 to 800 people.

Clan	Territory	Seasonal migration
Leetermairremener	St Patricks Head near St Marys	Wintered in the coastal areas of their own lands. Between August and October, congregated around Moulting Lagoon and Schouten Island. In October, moved inland to the St Pauls and Break O'Day rivers or up the Meredith River to the Elizabeth River area. In January, moved back to the coast.
Linetemairrener	North of Great Oyster Bay	As above.
Loontitetermairrelehoinner	North Oyster Bay	As above.
Toorernomairremener	Schouten Passage	As above.
Poredareme	Little Swanport	Wintered in the coastal areas of their own lands. In August, moved west to the Eastern Marshes and through St Peters Pass to Big River country, before returning to the coast in January.
Laremairremener	Grindstone Bay	As above.
Tyreddeme	Maria Island	As above.
Portmairremener	Prosser River	As above.
Pydairrerme	Tasman Peninsula	As above.
Moomairremener	Pittwater, Risdon	Moomairremener tended to move inland later than other bands, leaving between September and October and returning to the coast in June.

=== North East ===
The North East nation consisted of seven clans totalling around 500 people. They had good relations with the Ben Lomond nation and were granted seasonal access to the resources of the north-east coast.

Clan	Territory	Seasonal migration
Peeberrangner	Near Port Dalrymple	
Leenerrerter	Pleemoommererway country in the Boobyalla River region	
Pinterrairer	Layrappenthe country at Mussel Roe	
Trawlwoolway/Trawlwulwuy	Big Musselroe to Cape Portland; Mount William	
Pyemmairrenerpairrener	Piper's River; Great Forester River	
Leenethmairrener	Headwaters of the Great Musselroe River	
Panpekanner	Between Eddystone Point and Cape Naturaliste	

=== North ===
The North nation consisted of four clans totalling 200–300 people.

Clan	Territory	Seasonal migration
Punnilerpanner	Port Sorell	Winter spent on the coast. In summer, they would move inland.
Pallittorre	Quamby Bluff	As above
Noeteeler	Hampshire Hills	As above
Plairhekehillerplue	Emu Bay	As above

=== Big River ===
These sources record the group as comprising several smaller clans, whose names and territorial associations were documented inconsistently, and often phonetically, by European observers. Population estimates from the early 19th century suggest approximately 400–500 people across five principal clans.

Some 19th- and early 20th-century sources use the term Mairremmener (with variant spellings) as a broader or imprecise label for inland Aboriginal groups associated with the Big River region, rather than as a discrete clan name. Usage of the term varies across the historical literature and does not correspond neatly with the individual clan names recorded elsewhere in colonial accounts.

The following table summarises clan names and associated areas as recorded in early colonial and ethnographic sources, with modern townships listed for geographic reference only.

Clan (historical spelling)	Associated area (historical sources)	Notes
Braylwunyer	Ouse and Dee river systems	Central Highlands foothills associated with the Ouse and Dee rivers; area closely aligns with the modern Bothwell district. Representative townships include Bothwell, Ouse, and Glenfern.
Larmairremener	West of the Dee River	Clan name recorded in colonial sources; related spellings of Mairremmener were sometimes used historically as a broader label for inland Big River groups rather than a single clan. Representative localities include Interlaken and the western margins of Bothwell.
Leenowwenne	Upper River Derwent Valley	Inland River Derwent corridor; spelling varies across early colonial records. Representative modern townships within or near this area include New Norfolk, Bushy Park, and Hamilton.
Luggermairrernerpairrer	Great Lake and Central Plateau	High-altitude Central Plateau group associated with the Great Lake region; recorded spellings vary considerably in historical accounts. Representative modern settlements include Miena and Liawenee.
Pangerninghe	Clyde River–River Derwent junction	Associated with the Clyde River valley and its confluence with the River Derwent. Representative modern localities include Hamilton and Ouse.

=== North Midlands ===
The North Midlands nation is likely to have consisted of several clans, but three major clan divisions are accepted in the ethnographic literature today.

The total population of the North Midlands nation has been estimated at between 300 and 500 and, although the nation was migratory, the archaeological and historical record implies seasonal residency in locations adjacent to permanent water sources in the Midlands valley.

==== Clans ====
Three major divisions are generally ascribed to the North Midlands nation, although it is likely that more clans existed, and Ryan (2012) suggests the possibility of two further clan territories. What is known of the composition of the North Midlands nation derives from the descriptions of settlers, who ascribed simple tribal divisions based on locality, and from direct attribution by Aboriginal Tasmanians of the time, recorded by Robinson, collated by Plomley, and later researched by Rhys Jones. From this, it is certain that there were three major clan divisions, described by colonists as the Port Dalrymple tribe (Letteremairrener clan), at the Tamar River; the Pennyroyal Creek tribe (Panninher), at Norfolk Plains; and the Stony Creek tribe (Tyerrernotepanner), at Campbell Town.

===== Colonial contact =====
The Letteremairrener were among the first Aboriginal peoples to be affected by British colonisation, as colonial occupation began at Port Dalrymple and progressed to Launceston, with settlers progressively occupying land up the Tamar Valley. By the early 1800s, the Letteremairrener had been involved in skirmishes with colonial exploratory parties. In the second decade of that century, they had reached some accommodation with the colonists and were observed practising spear throwing near present-day Paterson Barracks and watching colonial women wash clothes at Cataract Gorge. Between 1811 and 1827, several Aboriginal children were baptised in Launceston; they had either been abducted or were the offspring of liaisons between settlers and Aboriginal people. By 1830, the Letteremairrener had largely disappeared from their homeland, and the survivors were waging a desperate guerrilla war against the British colonists, living a fringe existence in Launceston or on the margins of their traditional land. By 1837, the Letteremairrener had disappeared completely from the Tamar Valley; the survivors would eventually die in the squalor of Wybalenna or Oyster Cove.

===== Panninher "Pennyroyal Creek" clan =====
The Panninher (parn-in-her) were known to colonial people as the Pennyroyal Creek tribe, named after the river that flows from the Western Tiers south of Drys Bluff (now called the Liffey River). The Panninher called the Liffey River tellerpanger, and Drys Bluff, the mountain rising above their homeland, taytitkekitheker.

===== The Tyerrernotepanner "Stony Creek" clan =====
The Tyerrernotepanner (Chera-noti-pana) were known to colonial people as the Stony Creek tribe, named after the small southern tributary of the South Esk at Llewellyn, west of modern-day Avoca.

The Tyerrernotepanner clan was one of up to four clans in the south-central Midlands. Nevertheless, this clan name is now used as a general term for all Aboriginal peoples of the region.

The clan divisions of the south-central Midlands are suggested below. Caution must be exercised as to the provenance of the names and the accuracy of attributing them to discrete geographical regions.

- Tyerrernotepanner: clan at northern Campbell Town, the Lake River, and the southern Fingal Valley
- Marwemairer: clan in the Ross and Mount Morriston region
- Peenrymairmener: clan at Glen Morriston and Lake Leake
- Polemairre: clan in the Tunbridge area

The Tyerrernotepanner are consistently described in contemporary records as a "fierce tribe", and these records document concerted and sustained violence by the clan during the Black War. Along with clansmen from other remnant tribes, the Tyerrernotepanner conducted raids across the Midlands and, until "conciliated" by Robinson, were the subject of fearful reminiscence by colonists. The Aboriginal leader Umarrah was a member of this clan; he was noted for his aggression and sustained campaign against the colonists, although he had himself been raised by colonists.

Clan	Territory	Seasonal migration
Letteremairrener	Port Dalrymple	Ben Lomond Tier in summer.
Panninher	Norfolk Plains	Tamar River in winter, Great Western Tiers in summer.
Tyerrernotepanner clan group	Campbell Town	North Oyster Bay in winter.

=== Ben Lomond ===
The Ben Lomond nation consisted of at least three clans totalling 150–200 people. They occupied the 260 km^{2} of country surrounding the Ben Lomond plateau. Three clan names are known, but their locations are somewhat conjectural: the clans were recorded as Plangermaireener, Plindermairhemener, and Tonenerweenerlarmenne.

Plangermaireener is also used as a blanket term for the Ben Lomond nation, reflecting the suffix "mairreener", meaning "people".

The Ben Lomond nation is sometimes described as the Ben Lomond/Pennyroyal Creek nation, on the basis of an entry in Robinson's journal: "[Mannalargenna] ... said that 'the smoke ... was that of the Ben Lomond-Pennyroyal Creek natives'". This is a misnomer, as Pennyroyal Creek was the original European name for the Liffey River, and "Pennyroyal Creek tribe" was the contemporary name for the Panninher clan of the North Midlands nation. Mannalargenna would have been familiar with the clans neighbouring his own traditional country and could be relied upon to report accurately the composition of the clanspeople in question. It is plausible that, when Robinson was writing in 1830, the remnant peoples of the Ben Lomond nation had federated with those of the Panninher, and that this was the origin of the conjoined name.

Clan	Territory	Seasonal migration
Plangermaireener	South-east of the Ben Lomond plateau; St Marys Plains	Probable close relations with the Oyster Bay nation
Plindermairhemener	South to south-west of the Ben Lomond plateau	Reciprocal rights with the Letteremairrener
Tonenerweenerlarmenne	Probably the upper South Esk valley	Conjectural

=== North West ===
The North West nation numbered between 400 and 600 people at the time of contact with Europeans and had at least eight clans. They had good relations with the North nation, who were allowed access to the resources of the north-west coast. First explored by Europeans in 1824, the region was considered inhospitable and only lightly settled, although it suffered a high rate of Aboriginal dispossession and killings.

Clan	Territory	Seasonal migration
Tommeginer	Table Cape	
Parperloihener	Robbins Island	
Pennemukeer	Cape Grim	
Pendowte	Studland Bay	
Peerapper	West Point	
Manegin	Arthur River mouth	
Tarkinener	Sandy Cape	
Peternidic	Pieman River mouth	

=== South West Coast ===
Clan	Territory	Seasonal migration
Mimegin	Macquarie Harbour	
Lowreenne (Toogee)	Low Rocky Point	
Ninene	Port Davey	
Needwonnee	Cox Bight	

=== South East ===
The first European settlement in Tasmania, at Risdon Cove, was established on land belonging to the Aboriginal people of the South East region. Eyewitness accounts suggest the South East nation may have comprised up to ten clans, with an estimated population of around 500 people.

However, by the time Robinson began keeping his journals in 1829, only four groups totalling approximately 160–200 individuals were officially recorded. By then, much of the South East territory had been colonised, leading to displacement and severe depletion of traditional food sources.

The region contained some of Tasmania's most important mining sites for materials such as silcrete, chert, and quartzite.

The South East people are recorded as having a hostile relationship with the Oyster Bay nation to their north, including raids that reportedly involved the abduction of women.

Truganini belonged to the Nuenonne people of Bruny Island, known traditionally as Lunawanna-alonnah. The first European settlements on the island were named Lunawanna and Alonnah, and many of the island's landmarks continue to bear Nuenonne names.

The following table lists groups recorded historically in the South East. Some names, such as "Mouheneenner", are terms used in early colonial records and may not be the names people used for themselves. Contemporary understanding and use of language and group names continue to evolve through community-led cultural revitalisation.

Group	Territory	Notes
Muwinina	Hobart	"Mouheneenner" is the colonial record name for the people of the Hobart area. "Muwinina" is the preferred contemporary name, reflecting community research and language revival.
Nuenonne	Bruny Island	Truganini's people; traditional name for Bruny Island is "Lunawanna-alonnah".
Melukerdee	Huon River	Associated with the lower Huon River region, sometimes also spelt "Mellukerdee".
Lyluequonny	Recherche Bay	Southernmost recorded group, around Recherche Bay.

== Culture ==
Aboriginal culture was severely disrupted in the 19th century after the dispossession of land and the incarceration of Aboriginal people at Wybalenna and Oyster Cove. Much traditional knowledge has been irretrievably lost, and what remains has been nurtured over several generations, starting with the Aboriginal wives of sealers on the Furneaux Islands.

However, as the Aboriginal writer Greg Lehman states, "Aboriginal culture [is not] past tense." Aboriginal people continue to express their culture in a variety of forms, with themes that lament the past but also celebrate the endurance and continuity of culture into the future.

=== Mythology ===
The mythology of the Aboriginal Tasmanians appears to have been complex and possibly specific to each clan group. One of their creation myths refers to two creator deities, Moinee and Droemerdene, the children of Parnuen, the sun, and Vena, the moon.

Moinee appears as the primeval creator, forming the land and rivers of Tasmania and fashioning the first man, Parlevar – embodied from a spirit residing in the ground. This form was similar to a kangaroo, and Aboriginal people consequently take the kangaroo as a totem. Moinee then created the kangaroo, which, like the first man, emerged from the soil.

Droemerdene appears as the star Canopus, who helped the first men to change from their kangaroo-like form. He removed their tails and fashioned their knee joints "so that they could rest", and thus man achieved differentiation from the kangaroo.

After Droemerdene changed the shape of the first men, Moinee fought with his brother and with many "devils", and was finally hurled from the sky to his death, taking form as a standing stone at Cox Bight. Droemerdene subsequently fell into the sea at Louisa Bay. Toogee Low (Port Davey) remained in mythology as a residence of many "devils".

Tasmanian Aboriginal oral history also records that the first men came by land from a far-off country and that the land was subsequently flooded – an echo of the Tasmanian people's migration from mainland Australia to what was then peninsular Tasmania, and of the submergence of the land bridge after the last ice age.

=== Spirituality ===
Little has been recorded of traditional Tasmanian Aboriginal spiritual life. Colonial British sources recorded that Aboriginal people described topographical features, such as valleys and caves, as inhabited by spiritual entities, which contemporaries referred to as "sprites". Robinson recorded that members of some clans held an animistic regard for certain species of trees within their domain. Robinson recorded several discussions about spiritual entities that his companions described as having agency or as a source of interpretive power that aided them in navigating their physical world. Tasmanian Aboriginal people described these entities as "devils" and related that these spiritual beings would walk alongside Aboriginal people, "carrying a torch but could not be seen".

Mannalargenna, in particular, described consulting his "devil", which seems to have been a resident personal spirit that provided prognostic or oracular powers. The term "devil" might also be used to describe malevolent spiritual entities in the Aboriginal cosmos.

Aboriginal people recounted that there was a prime malevolent spirit called rageowrapper, who appeared as a large black man and was associated with darkness. Rageowrapper might appear borne on a strong wind or be the source of severe illness; this malign spirit might be released from a sick individual by cutting the skin to "let him out".

Several researchers assert that there was a belief in a Manichaean cosmos with a "good" and a "bad" spirit, delineated by day and night, although this may reflect the observers' cultural bias. Milligan, a contemporary at Wybalenna, described a creator spirit called tiggana marrabona, translated as "twilight man", but, as noted above, a number of supernatural beings were associated with creation.

An etymological study of Milligan's ethnographic data describes a pantheon of spiritual beings associated with environmental or supernatural phenomena:

- nama burag – "the ghost of the thunderstorm"
- ragi roba (see rageowrapper) – "the revered spirit"; frequently connoting the awesome, revered, or dreaded, and signifying ghosts or phantoms of the departed when connected with the signifier ragi
- laga robana – "awful spirit of the dead", i.e. the dead man; some kind of dreaded spirit or malevolent phantom
- maian ginja – "the killer"; also translated as fiend or demon, a bringer of death
- muran bugana luwana – "the bright spirit of the night"; a kind of benign or ebullient entity, often described as of female form, "clothed in grass"
- wara wana – "the spirit being"; also warrawah, translated as transcendental, ethereal, or spirit of the dead, associated with celestial bodies; may be malevolent
- badenala – "shadow man"; a ghost or spirit
- kana tana – "the bone man"; a Western nation term for the spirit of the dead
- nangina – "shadow" or "ghost"; contemporary association with "fairy" or "elf", a supernatural entity dwelling "in the hill – dancing (and) fond of children"
- buga nubrana – "the man's eye"; associated with the sun; possibly a benign entity

Traditional Aboriginal Tasmanians also related beliefs in a spiritual afterlife. One such belief, related by an Aboriginal person from the west coast nation, was that the spirit of the dead travelled to a place over the sea to the far north-west, called Moo-ai. This possibly reflects the ancestral memory of the Mara language group, resident in western Tasmania, who are believed to have settled Tasmania from the Warrnambool region in modern-day Victoria. Other Tasmanians stated that after death their spirits would have a post-corporeal existence in their traditional lands. Other references are made to an Island of the Dead, tini drini, described as "an island in Bass Strait" where the dead would be reincarnated or "jump up white men". "White" here refers not to Europeans but to the skeletal or phantasmic nature of the returned dead.

=== Funeral customs ===
The dead might be cremated or interred in a hollow tree or rock grave, depending on clan custom. Aboriginal people were also recorded as keeping the bones of the dead as talismans or amulets. The bones might be worn around the neck on a string of kangaroo sinew, either bare or enclosed in a kangaroo-skin bag.

=== Cosmology ===
Traditional Aboriginal Tasmanians saw the night sky as the residence of creator spirits (see above) and also described constellations that represented tribal life, such as figures of fighting men and courting couples.

=== Material culture ===
==== Use of fire ====
Tasmanian Aboriginal peoples used bark wrapping to protect fire-starting coals from Tasmania's wet maritime climate. When their last coal was extinguished, they would seek fire from neighbouring hearths or clans, but they probably also used friction fire-starting methods and possibly mineral percussion, despite claims that Aboriginal Tasmanians had "lost" the ability to make fire. Tasmanian Aboriginal people used fire extensively for cooking, warmth, tool hardening, and clearing vegetation to encourage and control macropod herds. This management may have caused the buttongrass plains in south-west Tasmania to develop to their current extent.

==== Basket making ====
Basket making is a traditional craft that has been developed into contemporary art. Baskets had many uses, including carrying food, tools, shells, ochre, and eating utensils. Basket-like carriers were made from plant materials, kelp, or animal skin. The kelp baskets or carriers were used mainly to carry and serve water.

Plants were carefully selected to produce strong, thin, narrow strips of fibre of suitable length for basket making. Several species of plants were used, including white flag iris, blue flax lily, rush, and sag, some of which are still used by contemporary basket makers; shells are sometimes added for ornament.

==== Shell necklace art ====
Making necklaces from shells is a significant cultural tradition among Tasmanian Aboriginal women. Necklaces were used for adornment, as gifts and tokens of honour, and as trading objects. Dating back at least 2,600 years, necklace-making is one of the few Palawa traditions that has remained intact and has continued without interruption since before European settlement. A number of shell necklaces are held in the collection of the National Museum of Australia.

The necklaces were originally made only from the shells of the Phasianotrochus irisodontes snail, commonly known as the rainbow kelp shell and usually referred to as maireener shells. Three other species of maireeners are found in Tasmanian waters. In the two decades to 2020, the number of shells declined following a decline in kelp and seaweed growth around Flinders, Cape Barren, and Big Dog islands caused by climate change, which has led to erosion of the sea bed.

==== Ochre ====
Ochre is highly significant in Tasmanian Aboriginal culture. Tasmanian ochre ranges in colour from white through yellow to red. Its uses include ceremonial body marking, colouring wood craft products, tie-dyeing, and other crafts and arts.

Traditionally, Aboriginal women had the exclusive role of obtaining ochre, and many Tasmanian Aboriginal men continue to respect this custom by obtaining ochre only from women. Though ochre is mined from sites throughout Tasmania, the most celebrated source is Toolumbunner in the Gog Range of north-west Tasmania, in the traditional lands of the Pallittorre clan. This was also a significant site of tribal meeting, celebration, and trading.

==== Ceremony ====
Colonial settlers described various traditional Aboriginal Australian ceremonies. One has been called a "corobery", although that is a mainland Aboriginal word adopted by British settlers. Ceremonial dance and singing depicted traditional tales as well as recent events. Robinson described a "horse-dance" depicting a horseman hunting an Aboriginal person, as well as the sensual "devil-dance" performed by women from the Furneaux Islands.

Battles and funerals were also occasions for painting the body with ochre or black paint. At the funeral of an Aboriginal man named "Robert" in Launceston, an Aboriginal mourner was asked the meaning of his body paint and replied, "What do you wear fine clothes for?"

==== Visual art ====
Colonial settlers of the time cited several examples of pictorial art drawn on the insides of huts or on remnants of discarded paper. These designs are generally circular or spiral motifs that represent celestial bodies or figures of clan people. Robinson related that one design for an Aboriginal hut was very accurately drawn and created with a kind of wooden compass.

The most enduring art forms left by Tasmanians are petroglyphs, or rock art. The most elaborate site is at Preminghana on the west coast, although other significant sites exist at the Bluff in Devonport and at Greenes Creek. Smaller sites include the cupules at meenamatta Blue Tier and isolated circle motifs at Trial Harbour.

Aboriginal people inhabited Tasmania's south-west from the Last Glacial Maximum, and hand stencils and ochre smears are found in several caves, the oldest of which is dated to 10,000 years ago.

=== Modern culture ===
==== Visual art ====
Tasmanian Aboriginal people are asserting their identity and culture through the visual arts. The art expresses the Aboriginal viewpoint on colonial history, race relations, and identity. Consistent themes in modern Tasmanian Aboriginal art are loss, kinship, and narratives of dispossession, but also survival. The art is modern, using textiles, sculpture, and photography, but often incorporates ancient motifs and techniques such as shell necklaces and practical artefacts.

Photographer Ricky Maynard has had his work exhibited internationally, and his documentary style "brings to light the stories of Aboriginal people where they have previously been absent or distorted. His photographs mark historical sites, events, and figures of great significance to Tasmanian and mainland Aboriginal people, and speak to their struggle in a subtle, poetic, and powerful way."

Modern painting in Tasmania has begun to use techniques shared with Aboriginal art in mainland Australia while incorporating traditional Tasmanian motifs, such as spirals and celestial representations. This shows that, as in mainland Australia, Aboriginal art is dynamic and evolving from established post-colonial preconceptions.

Tasmanian Aboriginal women have traditionally collected maireener shells to fashion necklaces and bracelets. This practice continues among Aboriginal women whose families survived on the Furneaux Islands, handed down by elder women to maintain an important link with the traditional lifestyle. Late in the 19th century, a number of women sought to keep this part of their traditional culture alive so that their daughters and granddaughters could participate in it. Today, only a few Tasmanian Aboriginal women maintain this art, but they continue to pass down their knowledge and skills to younger women in their community. Shell necklace manufacture continues to maintain links with the past, expressed as a modern art form.

==== Writing ====
The earliest publication attributed to Tasmanian Aboriginal authors, predating the journalism of David Unaipon by a century, was The Aboriginal/Flinders Island Chronicle, written between September 1836 and December 1837, though it is unclear to what degree its composition was influenced by "The Commandant", Robinson.

Tasmanian Aboriginal authors in the past century have written history, poetry, essays, and fiction. Authors such as Ida West have written autobiographies recounting their experiences growing up within white society; Phyllis Pitchford, Errol West, (Note: "In the 1970s a young Tasmanian Aborigine, Errol West, wrote a beautiful poem, The Moon Birds of Big Dog Island, about the great gaping absence that was being a Tasmanian Aborigine.") and Jim Everett have written poetry, while Everett and Greg Lehman have explored their tradition as essayists.

== Identity, heritage and legacy ==
=== Ancestral remains and repatriation ===
The Oyster Cove people attracted international scientific interest from the 1860s onwards, with many museums claiming body parts for their collections. Scientists were interested in studying Aboriginal Tasmanians from a physical anthropology perspective, hoping to gain insights into the field of paleoanthropology. For these reasons, they were interested in individual Aboriginal body parts and whole skeletons.

Tasmanian Aboriginal skulls were particularly sought internationally for studies in craniofacial anthropometry. Truganini feared that her body would be exploited after her death; two years after she died, her body was exhumed and sent to Melbourne for scientific study. Her skeleton was then on public display in the Tasmanian Museum until 1947 and was laid to rest, by cremation, only in 1976.

Many of these skeletons were obtained from Aboriginal "mummies" taken from graves or from the bodies of the murdered. Amalie Dietrich, for example, became famous for delivering such specimens.

Aboriginal people regard the dispersal of body parts as disrespectful, as a common tenet of Aboriginal belief systems is that a soul can be at rest only when laid in its homeland.

Body parts and ornaments continue to be returned from collections: the Royal College of Surgeons of England returned samples of Truganini's skin and hair in 2002, and the British Museum returned ashes to two descendants in 2007.

=== Genocide debate ===
While no consensus exists as to the cause of the near-destruction of the Aboriginal Tasmanian population, many historians of colonialism and genocide consider it to constitute genocide. The debate over the cause became part of the Australian history wars. Earlier accounts attributed this dramatic demographic collapse to the impact of introduced diseases, rather than to policy. Geoffrey Blainey, for example, wrote that by 1830 in Tasmania: "Disease had killed most of them but warfare and private violence had also been devastating." Keith Windschuttle argued that, in addition to disease, the prostitution of women in a society already in decline explained the population's collapse. Henry Reynolds attributed the depletion to losses in the Black War.

Many historians of colonialism and genocide, such as Ben Kiernan, Colin Tatz, and Benjamin Madley, consider that the near-destruction of the Aboriginal Tasmanians qualifies as genocide by the definition of Raphael Lemkin adopted in the UN Genocide Convention. Lemkin himself considered Tasmania to be the site of one of the world's clear cases of genocide, and Robert Hughes has described the loss of Aboriginal Tasmanians as "the only true genocide in English colonial history". Other scholars who have supported the assessment of the near-destruction of the Aboriginal Tasmanians as genocide include James Boyce, Lyndall Ryan, Tom Lawson, Mohamed Adhikari, Ashley Riley Sousa, Rebe Taylor, and Tony Barta.

=== Legislated definition ===
In June 2005, the Tasmanian Legislative Council introduced a reformed definition of Aboriginality into the Aboriginal Lands Act 1995. The bill was passed to allow Aboriginal Lands Council elections to commence, resolving the uncertainty over who was "Aboriginal" and thus eligible to vote.

Under the bill, a person can claim "Tasmanian Aboriginality" if they meet all of the following criteria:

- Ancestry
- Self-identification
- Community recognition

=== Government compensation for "Stolen Generations" ===
On 13 August 1997, the Tasmanian Parliament unanimously supported a statement of apology specific to the removal of children:

That this house, on behalf of all Tasmanian[s] ... expresses its deep and sincere regret at the hurt and distress caused by past policies under which Aboriginal children were removed from their families and homes; apologises to the Aboriginal people for those past actions and reaffirms its support for reconciliation between all Australians.

Many people in the community, academia, various levels of government, and non-government organisations are working to strengthen Tasmanian Aboriginal culture and improve the conditions of the descendant community.

In November 2006, Tasmania became the first Australian state or territory to offer financial compensation for the Stolen Generations, Aboriginal people forcibly removed from their families by Australian government agencies and church missions between about 1900 and 1972. The Stolen Generations of Aboriginal Children Act 2006 was passed unanimously by the Tasmanian Parliament. Up to 40 Aboriginal Tasmanians' descendants were expected to be eligible for compensation from the $5 million package.

== Notable Aboriginal Tasmanians ==
=== Activists ===
- Michael Mansell, activist and lawyer

=== Historical figures ===
- Arra-Maida
- George Van Diemen
- Kikatapula
- Maulboyheenner
- Robert Hobart May
- Towterer
- Tunnerminnerwait
- Truganini
- Fanny Cochrane Smith
- William Lanne, also known as "King Billy"

=== Leaders ===
- Eumarrah
- Montpelliatta
- Tarenorerer
- Tongerlongeter
- Walter George Arthur
- Mannalargenna

=== Sport ===
- Brady Grey, Australian rules footballer with Fremantle
- Graeme Lee, Australian rules footballer with St Kilda
- Kieran Lovell, Australian rules footballer with Hawthorn
- Rhyan Mansell, Australian rules footballer with Richmond
- Alex Pearce, Australian rules footballer with Fremantle
- Derek Peardon, Australian rules footballer with Richmond (first documented player in the AFL)
- Ryley Sanders, Australian rules footballer with the Western Bulldogs
- Tarryn Thomas, Australian rules footballer with North Melbourne
- Marcus Windhager, Australian rules footballer with St Kilda
- Emma Manix-Geeves, cricketer with the Sydney Sixers

== Literature and entertainment ==
- The play The Golden Age by Louis Nowra
- The novel English Passengers by Matthew Kneale
- The historical novel Doctor Wooreddy's Prescription for Enduring the Ending of the World by Mudrooroo
- The poem Oyster Cove by Gwen Harwood
- The AFI Award-winning 1980 film Manganinnie, based on Beth Roberts' novel
- The novel The Roving Party by Rohan Wilson, a fictional account of Mannalargenna and William "Black Bill" Ponsonby during the Black War
- The AACTA Award-winning 2018 film The Nightingale, written, directed, and co-produced by Jennifer Kent
- The play At What Cost? by Nathan Maynard, a Belvoir St Theatre production starring Luke Carroll, which premiered in Sydney in 2022 and returned for another run there before touring to Brisbane, Adelaide, and Hobart in 2023

== See also ==
- First Australians, TV documentary series, featuring Aboriginal Tasmanians in Episode 2
- Woretemoeteryenner (1795–1847), one of the few Palawa people to bridge the times before and after European contact
