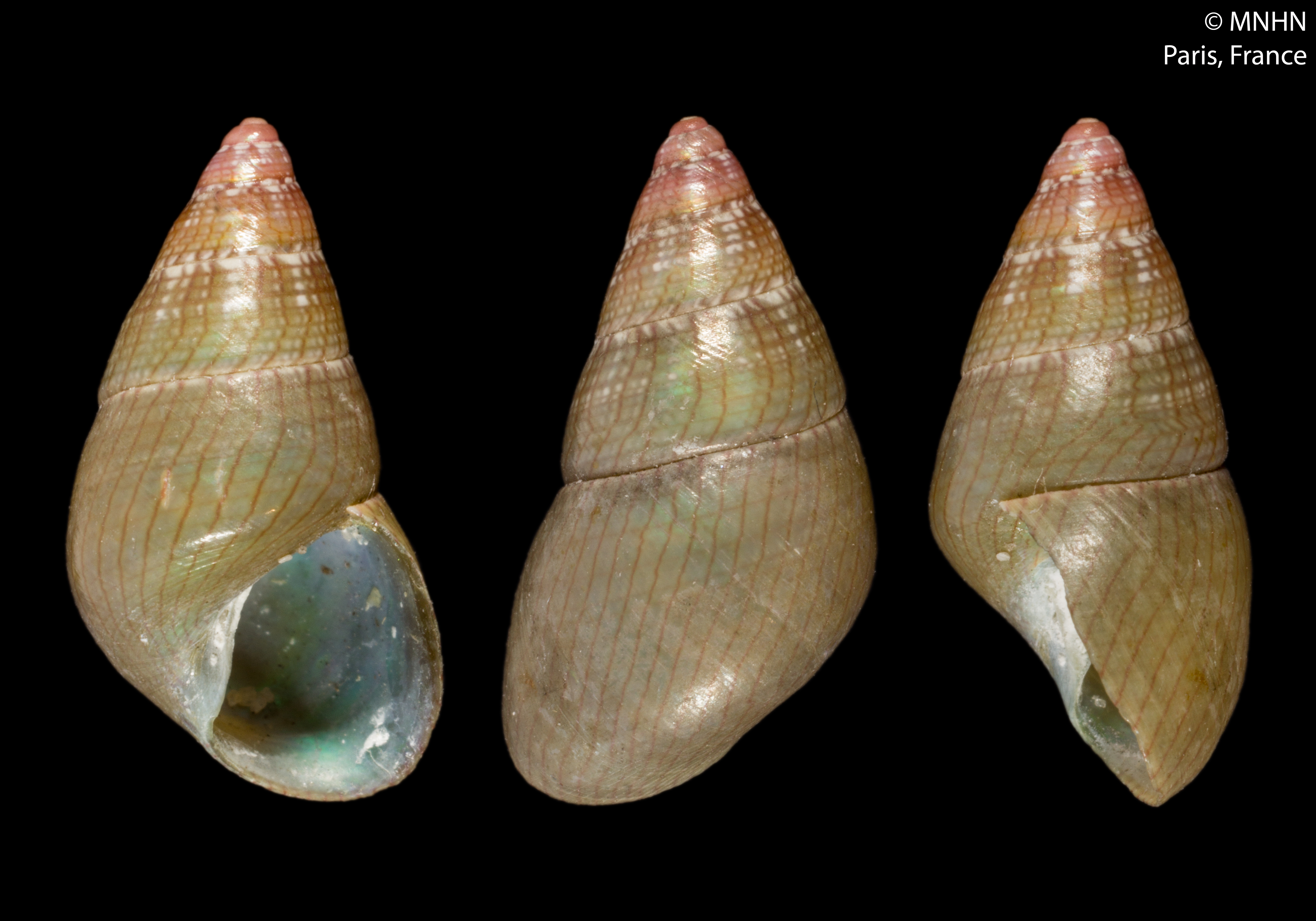
- shell of Phasianotrochus irisodontes (syntype at MNHN, Paris)

Scientific classification
- Kingdom: Animalia
- Phylum: Mollusca
- Class: Gastropoda
- Subclass: Vetigastropoda
- Order: Trochida
- Superfamily: Trochoidea
- Family: Trochidae
- Genus: Phasianotrochus
- Species: P. irisodontes

Binomial name
- Phasianotrochus irisodontes (Quoy & Gaimard, 1834)

Synonyms
- Cantharidus irisodontes (Quoy & Gaimard, 1834).; Cantharidus nitidulus (Philippi, 1855); Cantharidus schrayeri (Philippi, 1850); Elenchus irisodontes (Quoy & Gaimard, 1834); Elenchus nitidulus (Philippi, 1855); Elenchus virgulatus (Philippi, 1850); Eleuchus vulgaris Adams, 1853; Monodonta virgata Menke, 1843; Trochus iriodon Philippi, 1845; Trochus irisodontes Quoy & Gaimard, 1834 (original description); Trochus laetus Philippi, 1850; Trochus minor Philippi, 1851; Trochus nitidulus Philippi, 1855; Trochus schrayeri Philippi, 1850; Trochus virgulatus Philippi, 1850

= Phasianotrochus irisodontes =

Species of gastropod

Phasianotrochus irisodontes, common name maireener, rainbow kelp shell, or green necklace shell, is a species of sea snail, a marine gastropod mollusk in the family Trochidae, the top snails.

Found off the coast of Tasmania, the shells have been used to make necklaces by Aboriginal Tasmanian women in a cultural practice going back thousands of years. The effects of climate change and human recreational activities have reduced the populations of the snails in recent years.

== Description ==
The height of the shell varies between 10 mm and 20 mm. The pointed, imperforate, solid shell has an elongated conic shape. It is polished, yellowish, pink, or olive-green, with reddish or olive longitudinal lines in pairs, sometimes separate on the body whorl, and usually with numerous narrow, rather obscure spiral pink or yellowish lines. It sometimes has a few series of white dots on the upper part. The conic spire is shorter and less attenuated than in Phasianotrochus bellulus. The about 7 whorls are scarcely convex. The body whorl is not carinate. It is finely striate beneath, and smooth above. The aperture is rather large, often expanded. It is smooth inside, lined with intensely green nacre. The columella is strongly toothed below.

The coloration is quite variable with even unicolored green specimens. The aperture is sometimes so dilated that the spire seems to lean to that side.

== Distribution ==
This marine species is endemic to Australia and occurs in the subtidal and the lower intertidal zone off South Australia, Tasmania, Victoria and Western Australia.

Numbers have been observed to have been decreasing in recent years, with the causes put down to recreational activities reducing the amount of kelp habitat, predatory fish attracted by excess feed escaping from abalone farms, and storms eroding the seabed.

== Shell necklaces ==
Tasmanian Aboriginal women have been making shell necklaces from the maireener shells for at least 2,600 years, with some major collections in museums. The continuation of the practice is being threatened by reducing supply, and 6th-generation Palawa woman Lola Greeno is concerned that the practice will die out.
