= Phasianotrochus sericinus =

Scientific classification
- Kingdom: Animalia
- Phylum: Mollusca
- Class: Gastropoda
- Subclass: Vetigastropoda
- Order: Trochida
- Superfamily: Trochoidea
- Family: Trochidae
- Genus: Phasianotrochus
- Species: P. sericinus

Binomial name
- Phasianotrochus sericinus (Thiele, 1930)

Synonyms
- Cantharidus sericinus Thiele, 1930

Species of gastropod

Phasianotrochus sericinus is a species of sea snail, a marine gastropod mollusk in the family Trochidae, the top snails.

== Description ==
The elongated, ovate-pointed shell is thick, solid, polished. The ovate aperture is longer than broad. The columella is arcuate, bearing usually a tooth-like projection in the middle.

== Distribution ==
This marine species is endemic to Australia and occurs off Cockburn Sound, Western Australia.
