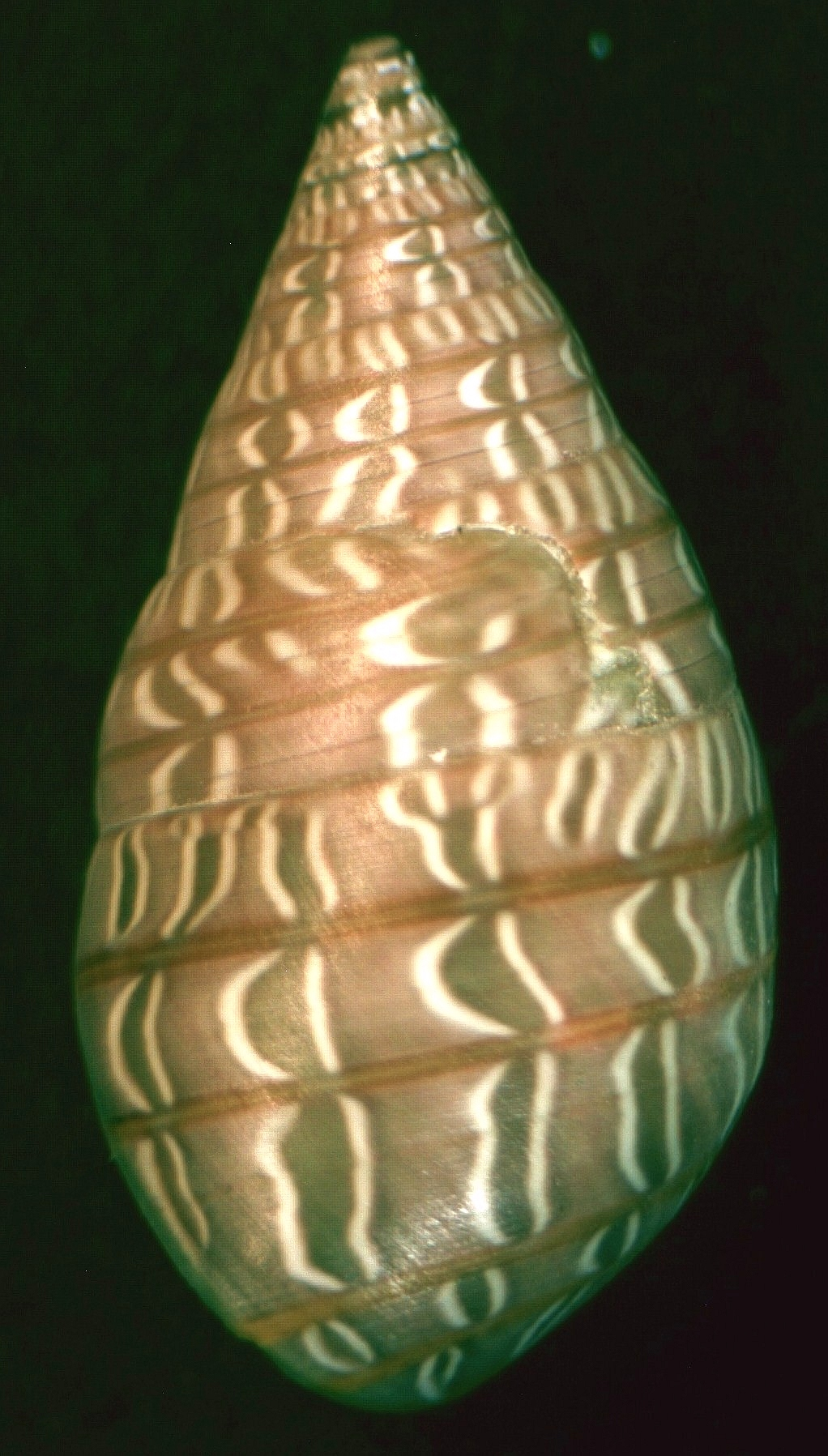
- Dorsal view of a shell of Phasianotrochus bellulus

Scientific classification
- Kingdom: Animalia
- Phylum: Mollusca
- Class: Gastropoda
- Subclass: Vetigastropoda
- Order: Trochida
- Superfamily: Trochoidea
- Family: Trochidae
- Genus: Phasianotrochus; Fischer, 1885

Type species
- Cantharidus badius Wood, 1828

Synonyms
- Elenchus H. and A. Adams not Elenchus (Humph.) Swainson

= Phasianotrochus =

Genus of gastropods

Phasianotrochus is a genus of sea snails. They are marine gastropod molluscs in the family Trochidae, the top snails.

== Description ==
The elongated, ovate-pointed shell is thick, solid, polished. The ovate aperture is longer than broad. The columella is arcuate, bearing usually a tooth-like projection in the middle.

== Distribution ==
These marine snails are endemic to Australia and can be found off the coast of New South Wales, South Australia, Tasmania, Victoria and Western Australia.

== Species ==
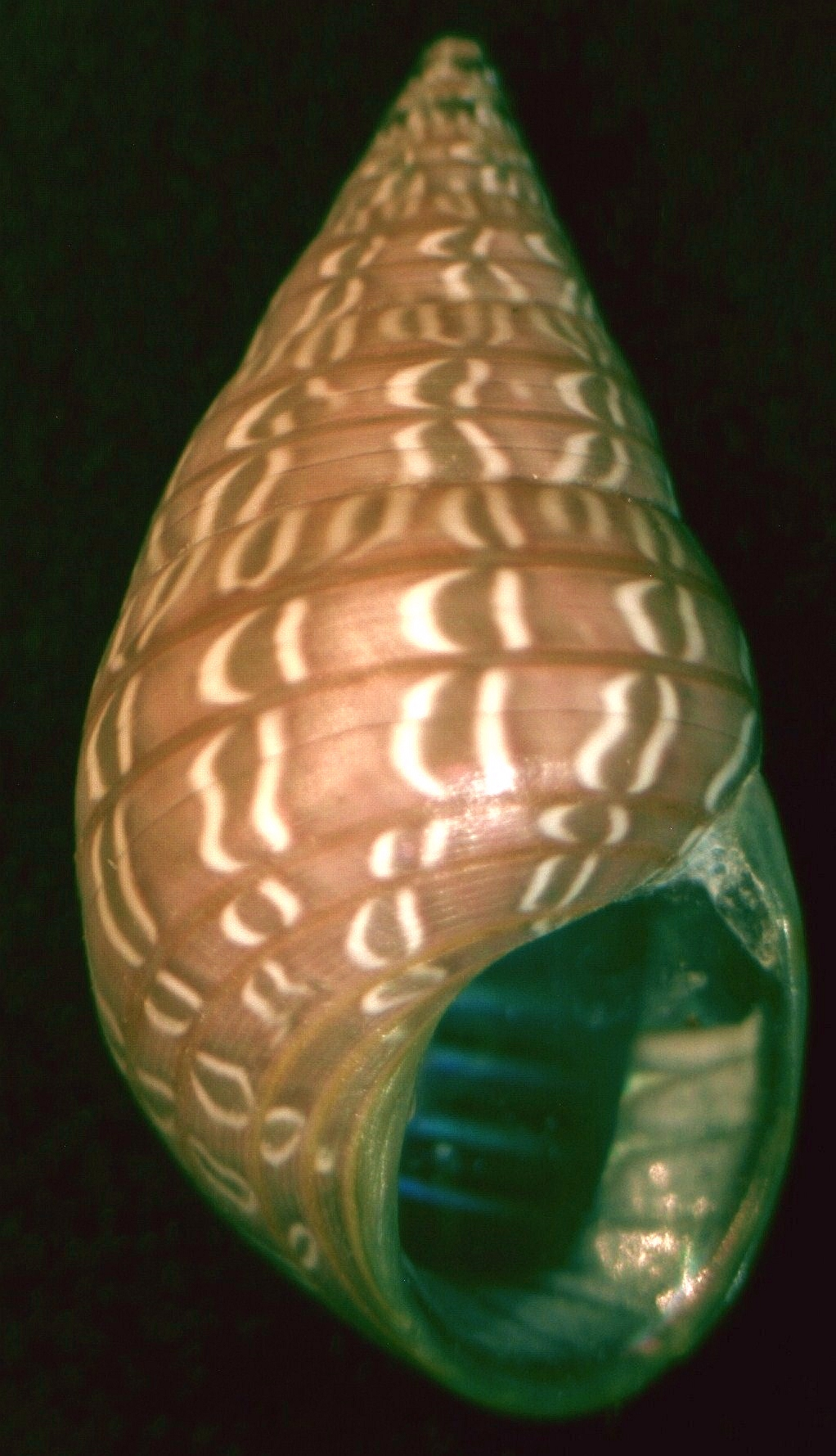
Phasianotrochus bellulus, apertural view

According to the Indo-Pacific Molluscan Database, the following species with names in current use are included within the genus Phasianotrochus

- Phasianotrochus apicinus (Menke, 1843)
- Phasianotrochus bellulus (Philippi, 1845)
- Phasianotrochus eximius (Perry, 1811)
- Phasianotrochus hirasei (Pilsbry, 1901)
- Phasianotrochus irisodontes (Quoy & Gaimard, 1834)
- † Phasianotrochus laxegemmatus Ludbrook, 1941
- Phasianotrochus rutilus (Adams, 1853)
- Phasianotrochus sericinus (Thiele, 1930)
- † Phasianotrochus subsimplex Ludbrook, 1941
