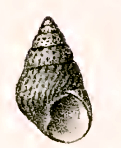
- Drawing of a shell of Phasianotrochus rutilus

Scientific classification
- Kingdom: Animalia
- Phylum: Mollusca
- Class: Gastropoda
- Subclass: Vetigastropoda
- Order: Trochida
- Superfamily: Trochoidea
- Family: Trochidae
- Genus: Phasianotrochus
- Species: P. rutilus

Binomial name
- Phasianotrochus rutilus (A. Adams, 1853)

Synonyms
- Cantharidus rutilus Tryon, G.W. 1889; Eleuchus rutilus Adams, 1853 (original description)

= Phasianotrochus rutilus =

Species of gastropod

Phasianotrochus rutilus, common name the pink-tipped kelp shell, is a species of sea snail, a marine gastropod mollusk in the family Trochidae, the top snails.

== Description ==
The height of the shell varies between 10 mm and 15 mm. The solid, imperforate shell has a conical shape. It is shining, fawn-colored or light yellowish-olive, with numerous narrow oblique flexuous reddish longitudinal lines. The upper whorls of the spire are more or less marked with white and pink or olive spots arranged spirally. The conic spire is straight sided. The acute apex is white or buf. The sutures are linear, becoming a trifle impressed around the body whorl. The about 7 whorls are planulate, densely spirally striate, the striae stronger on the base. The penultimate whorl is a trifle projecting above the suture. The body whorl is obtusely subangular at the periphery. The aperture is triangular-ovate. The outer lip is arcuate above, green-marginate just within the edge. This rim is followed by a band of opaque white which is deposited thi. It is not more than I2 mm broad, and does not extend to the upper angle of aperture. Within this the aperture is very brilliantly iridescent and green. The pearly columella is vertical, ending in an acute, compressed denticle. The parietal wall has a thin deposit of brilliantly iridescent Prussian blue nacre.

== Distribution ==
This marine species is endemic to Australia and occurs in the subtidal zone off South Australia, Tasmania and Victoria.
