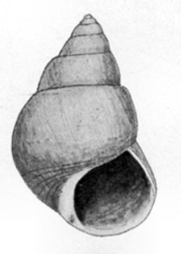
- Apertural view of a shell of Phasianotrochus hirasei

Scientific classification
- Kingdom: Animalia
- Phylum: Mollusca
- Class: Gastropoda
- Subclass: Vetigastropoda
- Order: Trochida
- Superfamily: Trochoidea
- Family: Trochidae
- Genus: Phasianotrochus
- Species: P. hirasei

Binomial name
- Phasianotrochus hirasei (Pilsbry, H.A., 1901)

Synonyms
- Cantharidus (Phasianotrochus) hirasei Pilsbry, H.A. 1901

= Phasianotrochus hirasei =

Species of gastropod

Phasianotrochus hirasei is a species of sea snail, a marine gastropod mollusk in the family Trochidae, the top snails.

WoRMS mentions this species as a taxon inquirendum Cantharidus hirasei Pilsbry, 1901

== Description ==
The height of the shell attains 15 mm. The ovate-pyramidal shell is solid. The color of the shell is a uniform olive or a brownish-olive, belted with numerous reddish spiral bands. The shell is smooth except for faint growth lines above. The base of the shell scores by 5 or 6 narrow, spaced, concentric grooves that become stronger near the axis. The conic spire contains 6½ convex whorls. The body whorl is subangular at the periphery and convex beneath. The oblique aperture is brilliantly green inside, with a dusky submarginal band and a pale edge. The white columella is opaque and rounded. The umbilical region is imperforate or has a very minute perforation.

This is the only species of Phasianotrochus outside Australia.

== Distribution ==
This marine species occurs off Japan and Korea.
