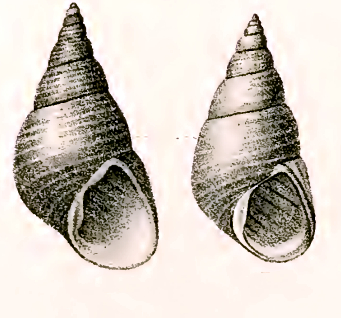
- Two views of a shell of Phasianotrochus eximius

Scientific classification
- Kingdom: Animalia
- Phylum: Mollusca
- Class: Gastropoda
- Subclass: Vetigastropoda
- Order: Trochida
- Superfamily: Trochoidea
- Family: Trochidae
- Genus: Phasianotrochus
- Species: P. eximius

Binomial name
- Phasianotrochus eximius (Perry, 1811)

Synonyms
- See list of synonyms

= Phasianotrochus eximius =

Species of gastropod

Phasianotrochus eximius, common name the kelp shell or true kelp, is a species of sea snail, a marine gastropod mollusk in the family Trochidae, the top snails.

This species was given many names over the course of time, but the accepted name was introduced by Iredale, T. & McMichael, D.F. in 1962.

== Description ==
The height of the shell varies between 20 mm and 40 mm. The imperforate, solid, rather thick shell has an elongated-conical shape. It is polished and shining. The color of the shell is brown, fawn-color or rosy, with widely spaced light or dark narrow spiral lines, usually four in number on the penultimate whorl. The surface is microscopically spirally densely striate. The slender spire is straight-sided. The apex is acute. The 7 whorls are a little convex. The body whorl is rounded at the periphery. The ovate aperture slightly exceeds one-third the total length. It is brilliantly iridescent within, and sulcate. The greenish peristome is thickened. The vertical columella is toothed below the middle.

== Distribution ==
This marine species is endemic to Australia and occurs in the subtidal and in the intertidal zone on seaweed off New South Wales, South Australia, Victoria, Tasmania and Western Australia.

== List of synonyms ==
- Bulimus eximius Perry, 1811 (original description)
- Bulimus carinatus Perry, 1811
- Cantharidus badius Pilsbry, H.A. 1889
- Cantharidus eximius Pilsbry, H.A. 1901
- Cantharidus leucostigma Pilsbry, H.A. 1889
- Cantharidus peronii Pilsbry, H.A. 1889
- Elenchus badius Angas, G.F. 1865
- Elenchus leucostigma (Menke in Philippi, 1843)
- Elenchus lineatus Angas, G.F. 1865
- Elenchus ocellatus Gould, 1862
- Elenchus splendidulus Swainson, 1840
- Monodonta rosea Lamarck, 1822
- Monodonta lineata Lamarck, 1822
- Trochus australis Quoy & Gaimard, 1834
- Trochus badius Wood, 1828
- Trochus fulimineus Kiener, 1850
- Trochus gracilis Philippi, 1851
- Trochus leucostigma Philippi, 1845
- Trochus lineatus Fischer, P. 1876
- Trochus lividus Kiener, 1850
- Trochus nitidus Kiener, 1850
- Trochus peronii Philippi, 1846
- Trochus quoyi Philippi, 1846
- Trochus roseus Philippi, R.A. 1850
- Trochus vermiculosus Kiener, 1850
