= Robert Hobart May =

Indigenous Tasmanian (born c.1801)

Robert Hobart May (c.1801 – ?) was an Aboriginal Tasmanian of the Mouheneener clan who, as a very young child, survived the 1804 Risdon Cove massacre to become the first Indigenous Tasmanian person to be baptised and live in colonial British society.

== Early life after parents killed in massacre ==
May was born around 1801 into the Mouheneener or a related clan that resided in the region around what is now known as the lower Derwent River in Tasmania. In 1803, the British colonists arrived to establish a settlement at Risdon Cove, which in early 1804 was relocated across the river to form the town of Hobart.

On 3 May 1804, a large group of around 300 Indigenous people had gathered near Risdon Cove to conduct a kangaroo hunt. The British military unit garrisoned at Risdon Cove under Lieutenant William Moore interpreted this gathering as a "hostile appearance" and proceeded to attack the Aboriginal people with firearms and cannon. The outcome has become known as the 1804 Risdon Cove massacre in which according to an eye-witness "a great many natives were slaughtered and wounded".

The surgeon of the settlement, Jacob Mountgarret, who helped lead the soldiers and convicts in perpetrating the massacre, abducted a young Indigenous boy found after the killings. The boy's mother and father had both been victims of the slaughter. Mountgarret also obtained the body of a dead man which he took away to be dissected. He later sent two casks of bones of the victims to Sydney.

Mountgarret took the boy to Hobart where he was christened by the reverend Robert Knopwood and given the name of Robert Hobart May. His traditional name is unknown. The lieutenant-governor of the settlement, David Collins, ordered that May be returned to his clan but this was never carried out. May continued to live in the household of Mountgarret in Hobart where he learnt English and lived like a European. He would tell dinner guests how his parents were killed in front of him, and the colonists were impressed with his brave attitude, which included fending off dogs with a stick.

A newspaper article of the time described the boy as:

remarkably active and tractable, manages a stick, and even handles a spear with surprising agility, and does not in any degree appear susceptible of fear or apprehension; but on the contrary, opposes with firmness every imagined danger. Against the attack of a dog he not only defends himself with a stick, but in turn becomes the assailant. In compliment to his native soil, and in remembrance of the month upon which it was the will of Fate that he should be rescued from a state of barbarous insignificance, he has been baptised Robert Hobart May.

== Possible later life ==
It is unclear what happened to Robert Hobart May as documented records of him after 1806 appear to be absent. However, in 1829 a Tasmanian Aboriginal man simply named "Black Robert", who is described as being raised and baptised as a child by the colonists, became part of George Augustus Robinson's "friendly mission" to acquiesce, round-up and exile the surviving Indigenous Tasmanians. This Robert went on to accompany Robinson throughout most of his expeditions around Tasmania, and was held in high regard as a resourceful and efficient man. He died on 23 March 1832 in Launceston from a chest infection and was buried in a Christian ceremony.

It is possible that this "Black Robert" was a different Indigenous person to Robert Hobart May, and there is a record claiming that "Black Robert" was taken as an infant in 1810 near Cross Marsh and raised into adulthood by the McCauley family.

== See also ==
- List of Indigenous Australian historical figures
