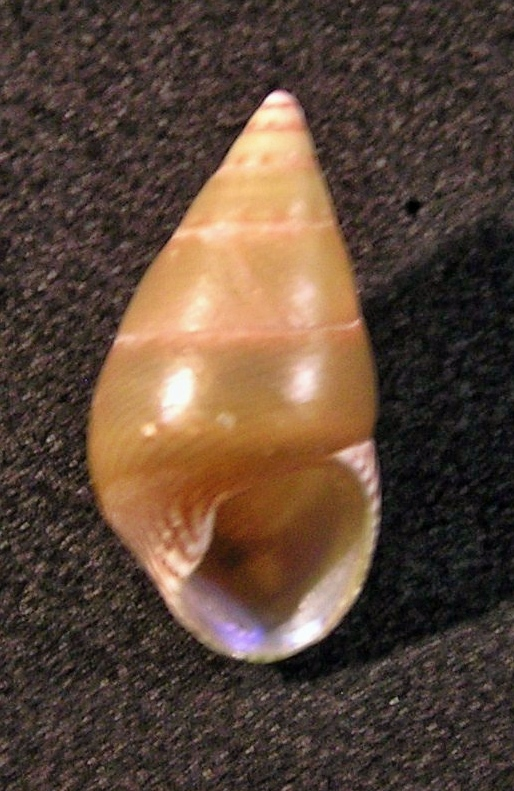
- Apertural view of a shell of Phasianotrochus apicinus

Scientific classification
- Kingdom: Animalia
- Phylum: Mollusca
- Class: Gastropoda
- Subclass: Vetigastropoda
- Order: Trochida
- Superfamily: Trochoidea
- Family: Trochidae
- Genus: Phasianotrochus
- Species: P. apicinus

Binomial name
- Phasianotrochus apicinus (Menke, 1843)

Synonyms
- Cantharidea ornatus Tenison-Woods, J.E. 1876; Cantharidus (Phasianotrochus) apicinus Pilsbry, H.A. 1889; Elenchus apicinus Angas, G.F. 1867; Monodonta apicinus Menke, C.T. 1843 (original description); Trochus apicinus Philippi, R.A. 1850

= Phasianotrochus apicinus =

Species of gastropod

Phasianotrochus apicinus, common name the pointed kelp shell, is a species of sea snail, a marine gastropod mollusk in the family Trochidae, the top snails.

== Description ==
The height of the shell attains 20 mm. The imperforate, solid, smooth shell has an elongated conical shape. It is shining, grayish, or brownish-yellow, with numerous narrow, fine, crowded, obliquely longitudinal red lines. These are often hard to perceive on account of the golden and violet iridescence. The whole surface is microscopically spirally striate. The striae are coarser on the base. The 8 to 9 whorls are nearly flat. The upper whorls are pink. The acute spire is turreted, and straight sided. The sutures are linear, sometimes with a white margin. The body whorl is rounded at the periphery. The oval aperture is slightly exceeding one-third the total length of the shell. It is smooth and not sulcate. It is beautifully iridescent within. The columella has a subacute tooth below the middle.

== Distribution ==
This marine species is endemic to Australia and occurs in the shallow subtidal zones off Victoria, Southern Australia, Western Australia and the north coast of Tasmania
