= Ricky Maynard =

Tasmanian documentary photographer

- Born: 1953; Launceston, Tasmania, Australia
- Education: International Center of Photography
- Occupation: Photographer
- Notable work: The Moonbird People; Portrait of a Distant Land

Ricky Maynard (born 1953) is an Aboriginal Tasmanian documentary photographer.

== Early life ==
Maynard was born in Launceston and his ancestry is of the Ben Lomond and Cape Portland peoples. He moved to Melbourne at 16 after being recruited to play for Hawthorn Football Club. After working as a darkroom assistant, he became interested in photography. In 1983, he became a trainee photographer at Australian Institute of Aboriginal and Torres Strait Islander Studies. While examining archival photographs of Aboriginal Australians in this role, Maynard became troubled by common misrepresentation and negative depictions.

== Career ==
Maynard developed a visual style influenced by American documentary photographers of the Great Depression era such as Paul Strand and Walker Evans, and began documenting Aboriginal Australians with a humanitarian lens. Many of his works have documented Aboriginal culture and social issues.

His 1985-1988 work The Moonbird People, which focused on muttonbirding in the Furneaux islands, garnered him international attention and a grant to study at the International Center of Photography.

In the 1990s, he created a series No More Than What You See, which featured portraits of Aboriginal people in four different prisons in South Australia. He visited Yatala Labour Prison, Northfield Prison Complex, Port Augusta Prison, and Cadell Training Centre, developing friendships with inmates to build trust. The series was in response to the publication of the Royal Commission into Aboriginal Deaths in Custody.
