= Arra-Maida =

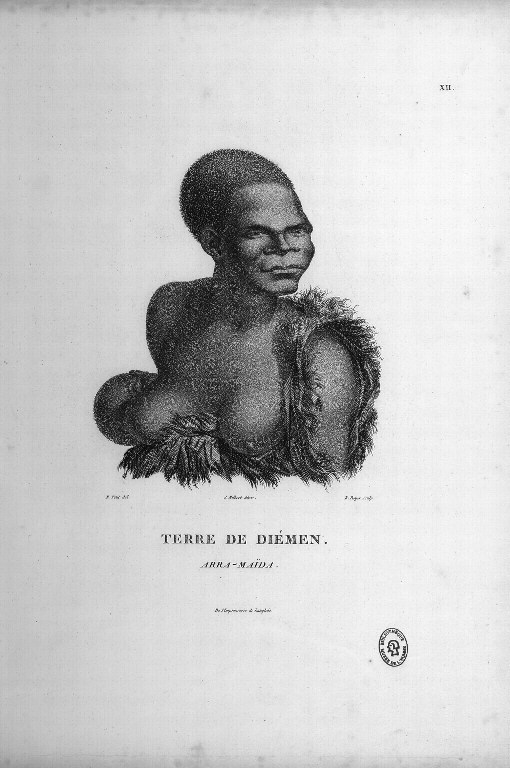
Arra-Maïda, pictured in 1802

Arra-Maïda was an Aboriginal Tasmanian woman, from the Nuenonne tribe, who was encountered by members of the French expedition to Australia led by Nicolas Baudin in January 1802 on the shores of Bruny Island.

As a part of this expedition a sketch was made of her and later published throughout Europe and, it the process of this, became known only as Femme de la terre de Diemen (Woman of the land of Diemen) or Femme de la Tasmanie (Woman from Tasmania).

== Biography ==
Very little is known of the life of Arra-Meïda outside of the Baudin expedition although it is known that she, alongside other Nuenonne women, allowed the French scientists Jérôme Bellefin, François Heirisson and François Péron to make anthropologic observations of them over a number of weeks in 1802. Péron recorded their initial interactions and that, when first meeting with them, he felt that she was criticising and laughing at their appearance and that, after Bellefin attempting to sing to the women, she mimicked his action and tone of voice. After this is also written that she put charcoal on her hands and rubbed it on to the face of Péron.

Following this initial meeting Péron continued to meet with her and described her as carrying a little girl, who was still breastfeeding, and said of Arra-Meïda specifically:

[her] eyes had the expression, and something of the spiritual which surprised us... She appeared to treasure her child very much; and her care for her that affectionate and gentle character which is exhibited among all races as the particular attribute of maternal tenderness.

— François Péron, as quoted in Skin Deep: settler impressions of Aboriginal women by Liz Conor (2016)

There are no further records of her life following this encounter with the French, however, a sketch of her, which was turned into a watercolour painting by Nicholas-Martin Petit was first published in 1807 in Voyage de découvertes aux terres australes (A Voyage of Discovery to the Southern Hemisphere, performed by Order of the Emperor Napoleon, During the Years 1801, 1802, 1803, and 1804).

This painting was subsequently wide circulation throughout Europe and, in an 1807 etching of it made by Barthelemy Roger, her name was excluded as she was refereed to only as Femme de la terre de Diemen (Woman of the land of Diemen) or Femme de la Tasmanie (Woman from Tasmania). The removal of her name was subsequently repeated in the many places it was republished.
