= 1804 Risdon Cove massacre =

Massacre in Van Diemen's Land

Coordinates: 42°49′23″S 147°19′09″E

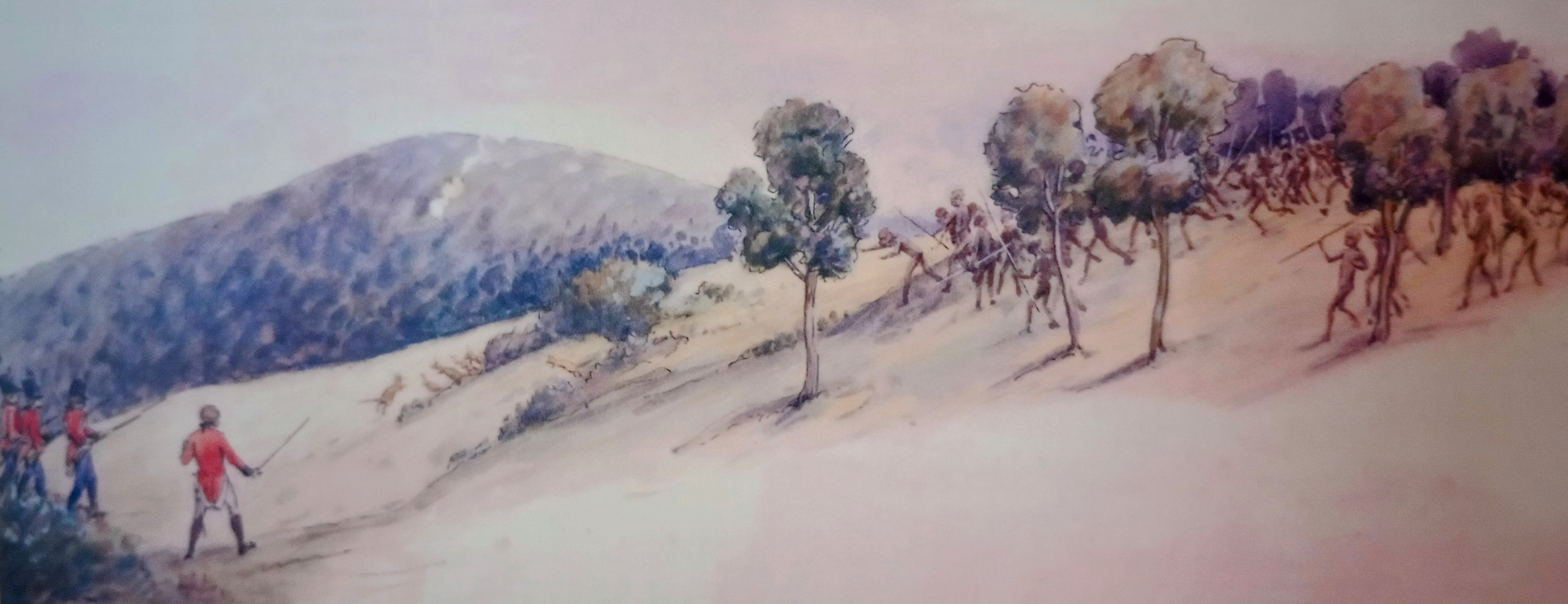
Painting of the Risdon Cove massacre by Dennis Colbron Pearse (1929)

On 3 May 1804, three or possibly as many as six Aboriginal Tasmanians were killed and others wounded by approximately 75 colonists and soldiers of the New South Wales Corps stationed at the fledgling British settlement of Risdon Cove, Van Diemen's Land. Although some details of the massacre have been debated, eyewitness evidence indicated that at least three Aboriginal corpses were accounted for when "a great many were slaughtered and wounded" by the soldiers and colonists.

== Events ==
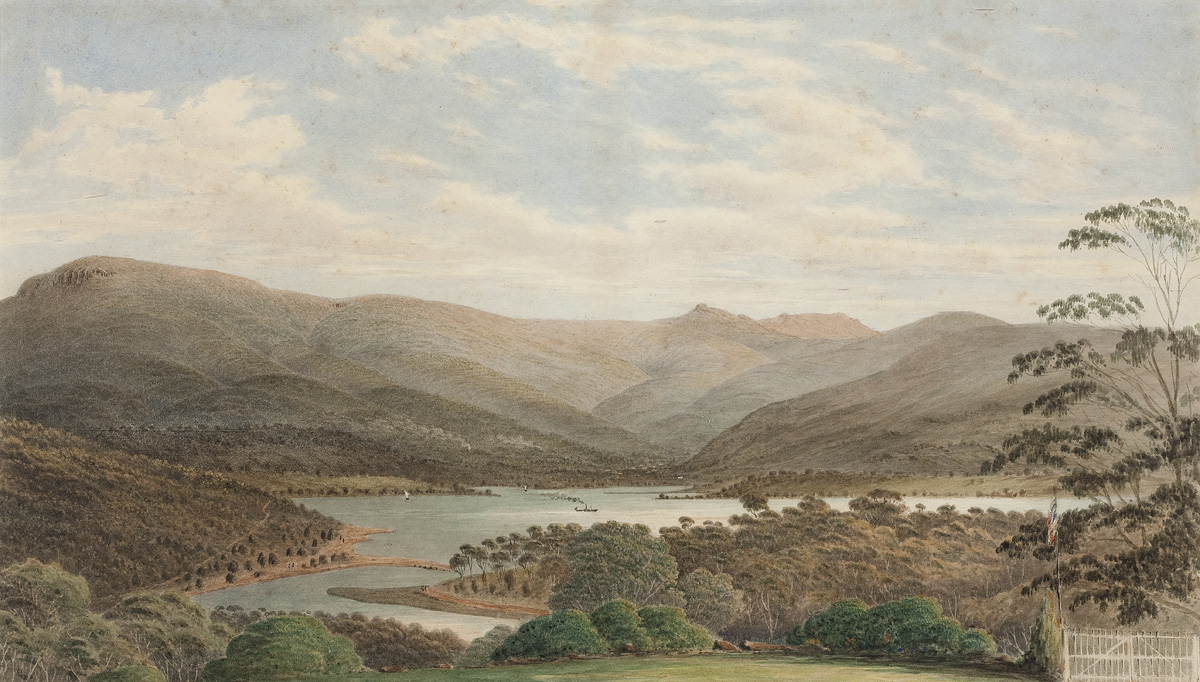
George Francis Evans: Risdon Cove from Old Government House, c. 1890

In early May 1804, around 300 Aboriginal people from either the Oyster Bay (Paredarerme) or Big River nation gathered near the recently established British outpost at Risdon Cove on the Derwent River. These men, women and children, approached the settlement whilst occupied on a kangaroo hunt. Although some were upset by the presence of the colonists, there had been no widespread aggression. The colonists and a detachment of soldiers from the New South Wales Corps stationed at the settlement mistakenly thought they were being attacked and under the orders of Lieutenant William Moore, the commanding officer at the time, launched three sorties against the native people.

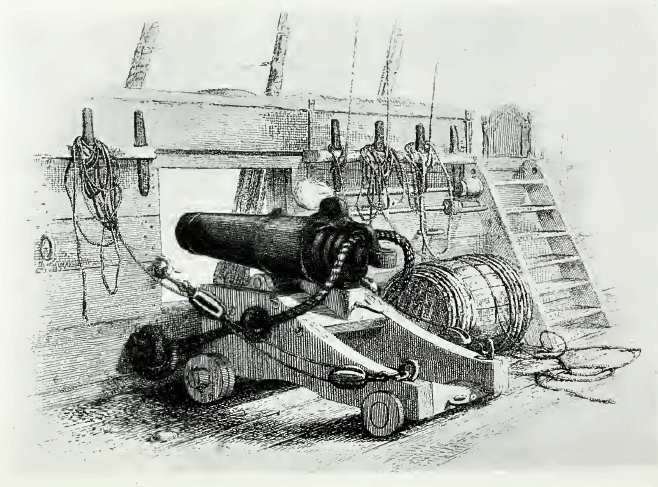
Illustration of a 12-pounder carronade, c. 1830

Lieutenant Moore, who together with his soldiers were possibly drunk, was wary of being able to protect the small outpost from such a large group of people, especially as both the commandant of Risdon Cove, Lieutenant John Bowen, and the Lieutenant Governor of Van Diemen's Land, David Collins, were absent from the outpost at the time.

The massacre of the gathered Aboriginal people began at 11 o'clock in the morning of 3 May 1804 and the final shot, a blast from a carronade, was heard in the neighbouring settlement of Hobart three hours later. The soldiers and the colonists were armed with Brown Bess muskets, which could be reloaded and fired once every 20 seconds and be used in close-quarters fighting as a club.

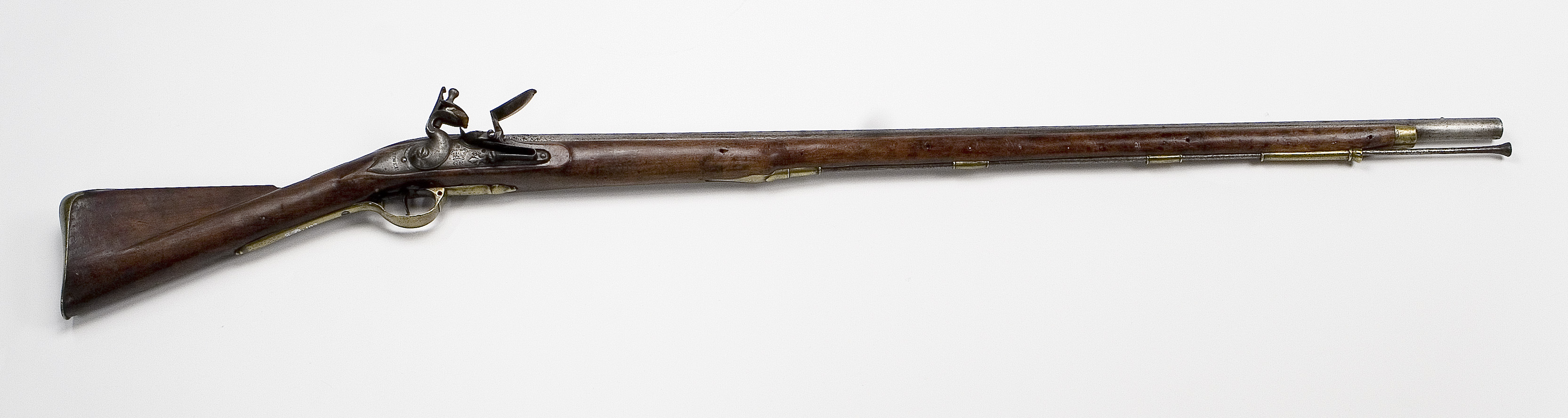
"Brown Bess" musket, c. 1773

In addition to the firearms, the soldiers were ordered to fire grape shot from a 12-pounder carronade (a short-barrel, heavy calibre naval cannon known to sailors as "the smasher") to disperse the Indigenous people. The clergyman Robert Knopwood heard "roar of the cannon at Risdon at 2 p.m". The 12-pounder carronade involved was one of two ordered to be salvaged from the ship HMS Investigator, by Governor Philip Gidley King and given to Lieutenant Bowen.

== Aftermath ==
"There were a great many of the Natives slaughtered and wounded", according to Edward White, an eyewitness to the event. Claiming to be the first to see the approaching Aborigines, he also said that "the natives did not threaten me; I was not afraid of them; (they) did not attack the soldiers; they would not have molested them; they had no spears with them; only waddies".

None of the colonists or soldiers were harmed during the massacre, while three Aboriginal Tasmanian bodies were recovered from the scene. The colonists "had reason to suppose more were wounded, as one was seen to be taken away bleeding". Reverend Knopwood was of the opinion that at least five or six had been killed.

It is also known that an infant boy about 2–3 years old whose parents had been killed in the slaughter was taken by Jacob Mountgarrett, the colony's surgeon. The boy was brought into British colonial society and given the name Robert Hobart May.

Mountgarrett also obtained the corpse of one of the deceased Indigenous men and dissected it. The skull and bones of this man were shipped to Sydney in two casks.

Five days after the massacre, the Lieutenant Governor of Van Diemen's Land, David Collins, ordered the closure of the Risdon Cove settlement. While he moved the settlers to Hobart, Collins ordered the outpost's soldiers to be sent back to Sydney citing their lack of discipline as being troublesome for the colony.

Lieutenant William Moore was acquitted of any wrongdoing in a court martial in September 1804. In 1809, he was promoted to the rank of captain in the 102nd Regiment.

William Charles Wentworth, in 1819, blamed the "inconsiderate and unpardonable conduct" of the colonists for the "hatred and hostility" which Aboriginal Tasmanians showed towards them, specifically attributing the "murderous discharge" or "unmerited and atrocious act of barbarity" that was the Risdon Cove massacre. Previously, he wrote, the indigenous people had "evinced the most friendly disposition" towards the newcomers.

In a 2022 publication, Truth-Telling at Risdon Cove, the authors claimed that Edward White, who gave important eye-witness testimony, was not actually present at the massacre. The substance of the book has been described as being easily dismissed and the authors' claims have since been rejected.

== See also ==
- List of massacres of Indigenous Australians
