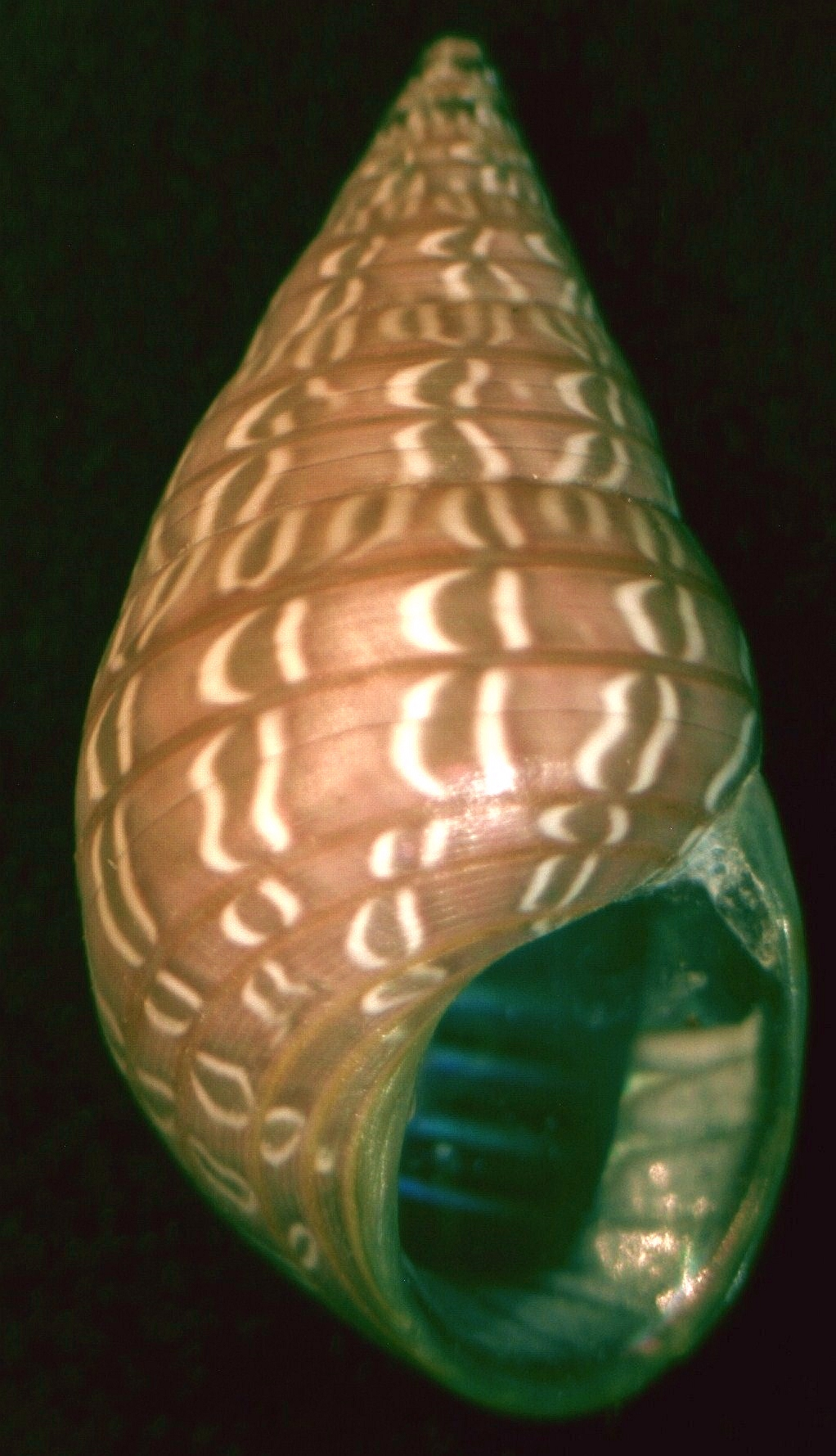
- Apertural view of a shell of Phasianotrochus bellulus

Scientific classification
- Kingdom: Animalia
- Phylum: Mollusca
- Class: Gastropoda
- Subclass: Vetigastropoda
- Order: Trochida
- Superfamily: Trochoidea
- Family: Trochidae
- Genus: Phasianotrochus
- Species: P. bellulus

Binomial name
- Phasianotrochus bellulus (Dunker, 1845)

Synonyms
- Cantharidus bellulus Pilsbry, H.A. 1889; Elenchus bellulus Angas, G.F. 1865; Trochus bellulus Philippi, R.A. 1845

= Phasianotrochus bellulus =

Species of gastropod

Phasianotrochus bellulus, common name the necklace shell, is a species of sea snail, a marine gastropod mollusk in the family Trochidae, the top snails.

== Description ==
The height of the shell varies between 12 mm and 18 mm. The solid, imperforate, acute shell has an elongate-conic shape. It is polished, grayish or pinkish, with a few spiral orange lines, two on the penultimate whorl. The spaces between these lines marked with short white curved lines in pairs, often forming a figure 8 shaped pattern. The about 8 whorls are nearly flat. The body whorl is rounded at the periphery. The spire is attenuated toward the acute purplish apex. The small aperture is contracted, sulcate and iridescent within. The vertical columella is strongly toothed below.

The color pattern is quite constant and characteristic. The interior of the aperture is more coarsely sulcate than in other species, showing only about 6 folds. The outer and basal lips have a slight submarginal porcellaneous subdentate thickening, which stops a little space short of the upper termination of the outer lip,

== Distribution ==
This marine species is endemic to Australia and occurs in the shallow subtidal zones off Victoria, Southwest Australia and Tasmania.
