= Warreen Cave =

Cave in Tasmania, Australia

Warreen Cave (M86/2)
- location in Australia Warreen Cave (Australia)
- 42°31′04.7″S 145°54′45.3″E
- Location: Maxwell River Valley
- Region: Australia

Site notes
- Excavation dates: 1980s-1990s

Warreen Cave is a large and remote cave in a dolomite cliff on top of a limestone outcrop situated in the upper Maxwell River Valley, 500 meters from the Lancelot Rivulet. It has an altitude of 200 meters, about 20 meters above the floor of the valley. The cave is about 30 kilometers from Strathgordon, the nearest town. It was originally known as M86/2, but was renamed to 'Warreen', meaning 'wombat' in the local indigenous Tasmanian language. The cave is the oldest site of known human settlement in Tasmania, at 35,000 years ago.

== Description ==
The section of the bluff in which the cave is situated consists of many boulders varying in size and shape, which evidently had detached from the parent rock and fallen. Access to the cave is through and down between the boulders, but the entrance is small and limited to one person at a time. Due to the configuration of the rocks, natural light only penetrates a meter or so into the cavern. By crawling under a large fallen boulder, it was discovered a second chamber, decorated with calcium carbonate formations. This second chamber had a six-meter drop in the eastern end that led to water.

The floor of the main cavern measures 7 by 4 m in its maximum. During the excavation, it became evident that the potential living area used to be considerably larger. A reconstruction showed that there may have been as much as 80 square meters of living space inside the dripline historically. It is assumed that the shelter collapsed somewhere between 17,610 BP and 18,150 BP.

When raining, water will enter through numerous fissures in the roof.

== Discovery ==
In January 1986, archaeologists from the Parks and Wildlife Service of Tasmania took part in an archaeological survey of the Maxwell River Valley. The aim was to explore the major dolomite outcrops. Over the 19-day expedition, the party of eight discovered multiple caves and explored some previously known caves. In the northern search area, two sites were found and test excavations were carried out in them. M86/1 found only two stratified stone tools, while M86/2, Warreen Cave, proved to be rich in artefacts. A 50 by 50 cm test pit was dug, about 90 cm deep. The pit took up a large amount of the excavation area, and, along with the poor lighting and large rocks in the pit, made the excavation somewhat difficult. 17 spits of material, each a depth of 5 cm were recovered. The first couple were sieved and sorted, but the rest were bulk bagged for removal due to time shortages. A probe revealed that the deposits continued for at least a further 30 unexcavated centimeters.

Analysis of materials collected from the surrounding caves on the expedition, especially the age of the tools, brought forward some immediate implications for Warreen Cave:

1. Since the basal deposits had yet to be reached, the site was already considerably older than any of the four dated sites. None of the others exceeded 20,000 years in age, and thus the age of Warreen's was at least 30,000 years, before the collapse at the front of the cave.
2. Warreen Cave appeared to have no Post-Glacial Maximum deposits. The archaeologists were puzzled by this as the bulk of other salvaged material were related to this period.

== Artefacts ==
The test pit in Warreen Cave brought forth nearly 10,000 pieces of stone and c. 30,000 pieces of bone. The stone artefacts were almost exclusively made of milky quartz. Eight pieces of Darwin glass were recovered. From the bones, most of the faunal assemblage were bones of Bennett's wallaby, but also showed the presence of minor prey species such as platypuses and wombats.

Previously, an excavation in Warreen Cave found many bones of small mammals and birds, as well as rare quartz 'thumbnail' scrapers, which were possibly used as chisels and gouges in woodworking and skinning.
