= Green Island (Tasmania) =

Small island nature reserve off the coast of Tasmania

Coordinates: 43°11′S 147°17′E

Green Island is a small island nature reserve with an area of 4.17 ha close to the south-eastern coast of Tasmania, Australia, at the entrance to the River Derwent.

It lies in the D'Entrecasteaux Channel.

== Flora and fauna ==
The vegetation is dominated by Acaena, bracken and thistles, with introduced grasses around the shoreline and some scattered Correa bushes. Recorded breeding seabird and wader species are little penguin, Pacific gull, silver gull, kelp gull, sooty oystercatcher and Caspian tern. European rabbits have been introduced to the island. The metallic skink is present.
