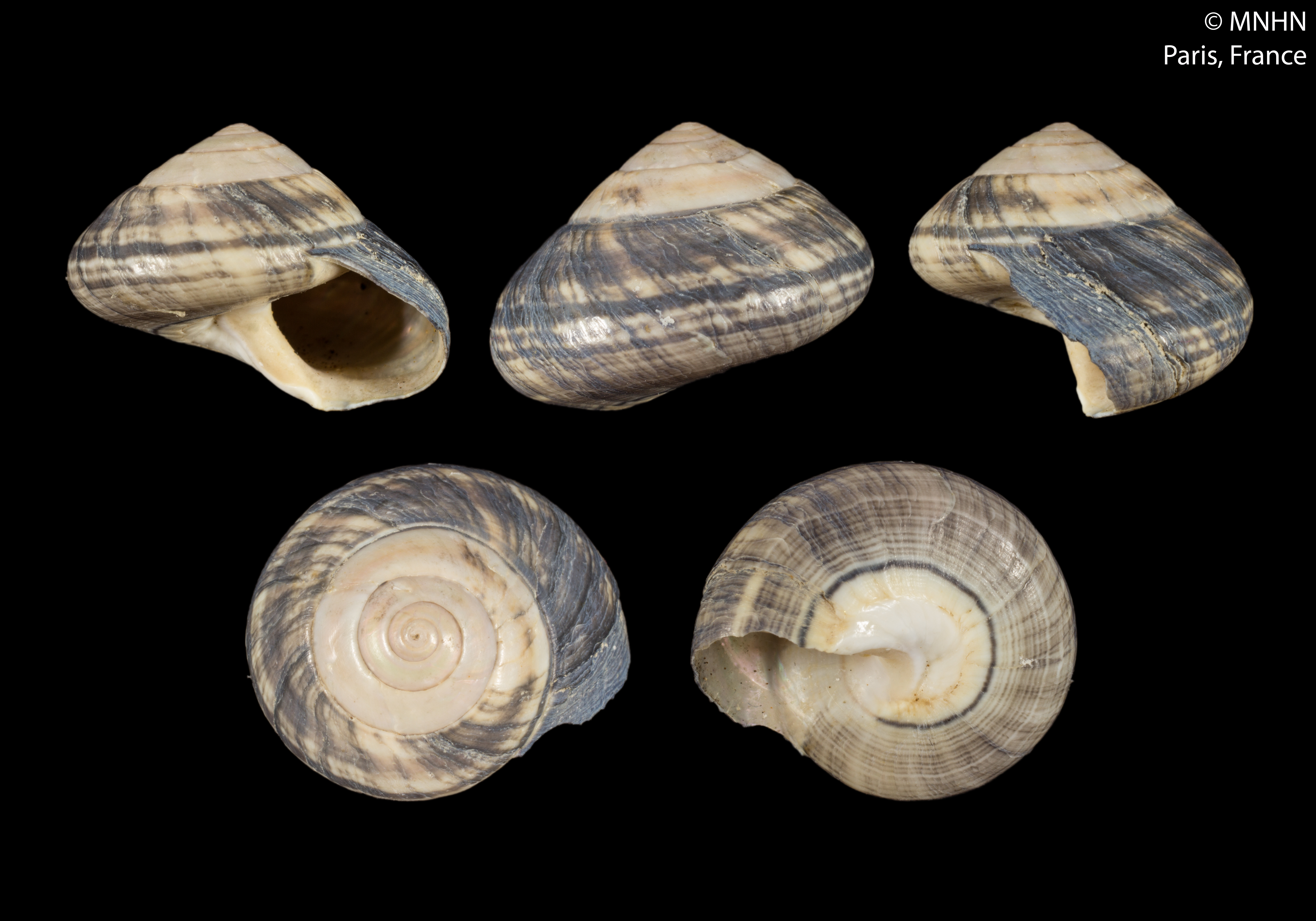
- Shell of Photinula coerulescens

Scientific classification
- Kingdom: Animalia
- Phylum: Mollusca
- Class: Gastropoda
- Subclass: Vetigastropoda
- Order: Trochida
- Family: Calliostomatidae
- Subfamily: Calliostomatinae
- Genus: Photinula; H. Adams & A. Adams, 1854

Type species
- Margarita coerulescens P. P. King, 1832

Synonyms
- Kingotrochus Ihering, 1902; Photina H. Adams & A. Adams in A. Adams, 1851

= Photinula =

Genus of gastropods

Photinula is a genus of sea snails, marine gastropod mollusks in the family Calliostomatidae.

== Species ==
Species within the genus Photinula include:

- Photinula coerulescens King and Broderip, 1831
- Photinula crawshayi E. A. Smith, 1905
- Photinula lahillei Ihering, 1902
- Photinula roseolineata E. A. Smith, 1905
- Photinula virginalis Rochebrune & Mabille, 1885

Taxon inquirendum

- Photinula solidula J. E. Cooper & Preston, 1910

Species brought into synonymy

- Photinula achilles Strebel, 1908: synonym of Margarella achilles (Strebel, 1908)
- Photinula antipoda (Hombron & Jacquinot, 1854): synonym of Cantharidus antipoda antipoda (Hombron & Jacquinot, 1854)
- Photinula blakei (Clench & Aguayo, 1938): synonym of Carolesia blakei (Clench & Aguayo, 1938)
- Photinula couteaudi Mabille & Rochebrune, 1889: synonym of Photinula coerulescens (P. P. King, 1832)
- Photinula decepta Odhner, N.H.J., 1924: synonym of Cantharidus antipoda antipoda (Hombron & Jacquinot, 1854)
- Photinula expansa (G.B. Sowerby I, 1838): synonym of Margarella expansa (G.B. Sowerby I, 1838)
- Photinula gamma Rochebrune & Mabille, 1885: synonym of Photinastoma taeniatum (G. B. Sowerby I, 1825)
- Photinula halmyris Rochebrune & Mabille, 1885: synonym of Margarella violacea (P. P. King, 1832)
- Photinula impervia Strebel, 1908: synonym of Lissotesta impervia (Strebel, 1908) (original combination)
- Photinula paradoxa Mabille, 1885: synonym of Photinastoma taeniatum (G. B. Sowerby I, 1825)
- Photinula pruinosa Rochebrune & Mabille, 1885: synonym of Margarella pruinosa (Rochebrune & Mabille, 1885) (original combination)
- Photinula steineni Strebel, 1905: synonym of Margarella steineni (Strebel, 1905)
- Photinula suteri E. A. Smith, 1894: synonym of Cantharidus dilatatus (G. B. Sowerby II, 1870) (junior synonym)
- Photinula taeniata (G. B. Sowerby I, 1825): synonym of Photinastoma taeniatum (G. B. Sowerby I, 1825)
- Photinula viaginalis Rochebrune & Mabille, 1885: synonym of Photinula virginalis Rochebrune & Mabille, 1885 (incorrect original spelling)
- Photinula violacea (P. P. King, 1832): synonym of Margarella violacea (P. P. King, 1832)
- Photinula wacei Melvill & Standen, 1918: synonym of Margarella wacei (Melvill & Standen, 1918) (original combination)
