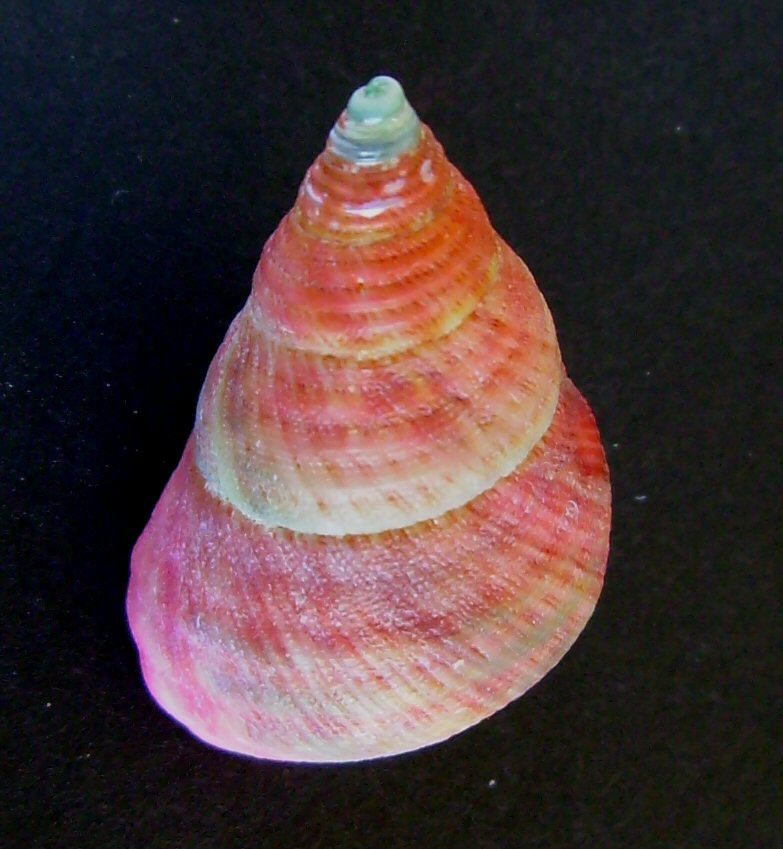
- A shell of Cantharidus opalus opalus

Scientific classification
- Kingdom: Animalia
- Phylum: Mollusca
- Class: Gastropoda
- Subclass: Vetigastropoda
- Order: Trochida
- Superfamily: Trochoidea
- Family: Trochidae
- Genus: Cantharidus; Montfort, 1810

Type species
- Trochus iris Montfort, P.D. de, 1810

Synonyms
- Cantharidus (Cantharidus) Montfort, 1810; Cantharis Férussac, 1822; Canthiridus [sic] A. Adams, 1851; Elenchus Swainson, 1840; Cantharidium Schaufuss, 1869; Iwakawatrochus Kuroda & Habe, 1954; Limax Martyn, 1784 (non-binomial); Mawhero Marshall, 1998; Micrelenchus Finlay, 1926; Micrelenchus (Micrelenchus) Finlay, 1926; Micrelenchus (Plumbelenchus) Finlay, 1926; Plumbelenchus Finlay, 1926; Trochus (Cantharidus) Montfort, 1810; Trochus (Osilinus) Philippi, 1847

= Cantharidus =

Genus of gastropods

Cantharidus, common name the kelp shells, is a genus of sea snails, marine gastropod molluscs of the family Trochidae, the top shells.

== Description ==
The shell has an ovate-conic or pyramidal shape. It is imperforate, smooth or spirally sculptured outside, brilliantly iridescent within. The colors are generally bright and variegated. The aperture is less than half the length of shell, longer than wide, ovate. The columella is usually more or less folded or toothed near the base.

The central tooth of the radula has a body with broadly expanded supporting wings, a narrowed peduncle or neck, which bears a simple cusp. This peduncle has on each side delicate wings. The lateral teeth number five on each side and have as peculiarity that they increase in size from the inner to the outer one. The inner lateral is slender, narrowed toward the cusp, like the centrals, and (sometimes at any rate) bearing a lamella behind the peduncle. The outer laterals are very broad, with one or several denticles on the cusp. The only character separating Cantharidus from Gibbula is the simple cusp of the central tooth, whilst in Gibbula it is denticulate at the sides.

== Distribution ==
This genus is composed of marine species with a wide distribution, occurring off Australia, New Zealand, the Philippines, French Polynesia, South Korea, Japan, Indonesia, New Caledonia, Oceania, East India, Africa.

== Species ==
The World Register of Marine Species (WoRMS) includes the following species with valid names within the genus Cantharidus :

- Cantharidus antipodum (Hombron & Jacquinot, 1854)
- Cantharidus bisbalteatus Pilsbry, 1901
- Cantharidus callichrous (Philippi, 1849)
- Cantharidus capillaceus (Philippi, 1848)
- Cantharidus crenelliferus (Adams, 1853)
- Cantharidus dilatatus (Sowerby II, 1870)
- Cantharidus festivus (B. A. Marshall, 1998)
- Cantharidus fournieri (Crosse, 1863)
- Cantharidus fulminatus (Hutton, 1873)
- Cantharidus fultoni (G. B. Sowerby III, 1890)
- Cantharidus interruptus (W. Wood, 1828)
- Cantharidus japonicus (A. Adams, 1853)
- Cantharidus jessoensis Schrenck, L. von, 1863
- Cantharidus lepidus (Philippi, 1849)
- Cantharidus levis Bozzetti, 2021
- Cantharidus marmoreus Pease, W.H., 1868
- Cantharidus nolfi Poppe, Tagaro & Dekker, 2006
- Cantharidus opalus (Martyn, 1784)
- Cantharidus pallidulus A. Adams, 1853 (taxon inquirendum)
- Cantharidus puysegurensis (Powell, 1939)
- Cantharidus roseopictus (E. A. Smith, 1913)
- Cantharidus sendersi Poppe, Tagaro & Dekker, 2006
- Cantharidus turneri (Powell, 1939)

The Indo-Pacific Molluscan Database also mentions the following species with names in current use :

- Cantharidus vittata (Pilsbry, 1903)

Species and subspecies within the genus Cantharidus include:

- Cantharidus cinguliger A. Adams, 1851 (taxon inquirendum))
- Cantharidus fumosus Dillwyn, 1817
- Cantharidus iridis A. Adams, 1851
- Cantharidus moniliger A. Adams, 1851 (taxon inquirendum))
- Cantharidus nigricans A. Adams, 1851
- Cantharidus nitidulus A. Adams, 1851 (synonym: Trochus nitidulus Philippi)
- Cantharidus punctulosus A. Adams, 1851 (taxon inquirendum))
- Cantharidus purpuratus A. Adams, 1851 (synonym: Trochus purpuratus Martyn)

Species brought into synonymy

- Cantharidus artensis (P. Fischer, 1878): synonym of Trochus artensis P. Fischer, 1878
- Cantharidus artizona A. Adams, 1851: synonym of Roseaplagis artizona (A. Adams, 1853) (original combination)
- Cantharidus articularis A. Adams, 1851: synonym of Jujubinus interruptus (Wood, 1828)
- Cantharidus bisculptus E.A. Smith: synonym of Dactylastele burnupi (E. A. Smith, 1899)
- Cantharidus burchorum Marshall, 1998: synonym of Micrelenchus burchorum (B. A. Marshall, 1998)
- Cantharidus caelatus Hutton, 1884: synonym of Roseaplagis caelatus (Hutton, 1884)
- Cantharidus capillaceus coruscans (Hedley, 1916): synonym of Cantharidus capillaceus (Philippi, 1848)
- Cantharidus columna Dall, 1890: synonym of Halistylus columna (Dall, 1890)
- Cantharidus elongatus Wood: synonym of Thalotia elongata Sowerby, G.B. I, 1818
- Cantharidus fultoni (Melvill, 1898): synonym of Trochus fultoni Melvill, 1898
- Cantharidus gilberti Montrouzier, 1878: synonym of Cantharidus polychroma (A. Adams, 1853)
- Cantharidus hirasei Pilsbry, 1901: synonym of Phasianotrochus hirasei (Pilsbry, 1901)
- Cantharidus huttonii (E. A. Smith, 1876): synonym of Micrelenchus huttonii (E. A. Smith, 1876)
- Cantharidus infuscatus Gould, 1861: synonym of Kanekotrochus infuscatus (Gould, 1861)
- Cantharidus iris (Gmelin, 1791): synonym of Cantharidus opalus (Martyn, 1784)
- Cantharidus kotschyi (Philippi, 1849): synonym of Osilinus kotschyi (Philippi, 1849)
- Cantharidus lepidus Philippi, R.A., 1849: synonym of Strigosella lepida (Philippi, 1846)
- Cantharidus macquariensis (Hedley, 1916): synonym of Margarella macquariensis Hedley, 1916
- Cantharidus montagui (W. Wood, 1828): synonym of Jujubinus montagui (Wood, 1828)
- Cantharidus mortenseni (Odhner, 1924): synonym of Roseaplagis mortenseni (Odhner, 1924)
- Cantharidus oliveri Iredale, 1915: synonym of Cantharidus sanguineus (Gray, 1843)
- Cantharidus parcipictus (Powel, 1946): synonym of Cantharidus tenebrosus A. Adams, 1853
- Cantharidus picturatum A. Adams, 1851: synonym of Calliostoma picturatum (A. Adams, 1851)
- Cantharidus pliciferus Schepman, 1908: synonym of Perrinia plicifera (Schepman, 1908)
- Cantharidus polychroma (A. Adams, 1853): synonym of Jujubinus polychroma (A. Adams, 1853)
- Cantharidus pruninus Gould, 1849: synonym of Cantharidus capillaceus (Philippi, 1849) (error for pruninus)
- Cantharidus pruninus minor E. A. Smith, 1902: synonym of Cantharidus capillaceus (Philippi, 1849)
- Cantharidus pruninus perobtusus Pilsbry, H.A., 1889: synonym of Cantharidus capillaceus (Philippi, 1849)
- Cantharidus pulcherrimus (W. Wood, 1828): synonym of Prothalotia pulcherrima (W. Wood, 1828)
- Cantharidus purpureus (Gmelin, 1791): synonym of Micrelenchus purpureus (Gmelin, 1791)
- Cantharidus roseus (Hutton, 1873): synonym of Cantharidus antipodum (Hombron & Jacquinot, 1848)
- Cantharidus rufozona (A. Adams, 1851): synonym of Roseaplagis rufozona (A. Adams, 1853) (original combination)
- Cantharidus sanguineus (Gray, J.E. in Dieffenbach, 1843): synonym of Micrelenchus sanguineus (Gray, 1843)
- Cantharidus sanguineus bakeri Fleming, 1948: synonym of Cantharidus artizona A. Adams, 1853
- Cantharidus sanguineus var. caelatus Hutton, 1884: synonym of Cantharidus caelatus Hutton, 1884
- Cantharidus sanguineus cryptus (Powell, 1946): synonym of Cantharidus sanguineus (Gray in Dieffenbach, 1843)
- Cantharidus sanguineus var. elongata Suter, 1897: synonym of Cantharidus artizona A. Adams, 1853
- Cantharidus simulatus Hutton: synonym of Cantharidus dilatatus (G. B. Sowerby II, 1870)
- Cantharidus suarezensis (P. Fischer, 1878): synonym of Jujubinus suarezensis (P. Fischer, 1878)
- Cantharidus suturalis (A. Adams, 1853): synonym of Prothalotia suturalis (A. Adams, 1853)
- Cantharidus tenebrosus A. Adams, 1851: synonym of Micrelenchus tenebrosus (A. Adams, 1853) (original combination)
- Cantharidus tenebrosus var. huttonii (E.A. Smith, 1876): synonym of Cantharidus huttonii (E. A. Smith, 1876)
- Cantharidus tessellatus (A. Adams, 1853): synonym of Micrelenchus tesselatus (A. Adams, 1853)
- Cantharidus tristis Thiele, 1930: synonym of Jujubinus polychromus (A. Adams, 1853)
- Cantharidus urbanus (Gould, 1861): synonym of Iwakawatrochus urbanus (Gould, 1861)
- Cantharidus zealandicus A. Adams, 1851: synonym of Cantharidus opalus (Martyn, 1784)
