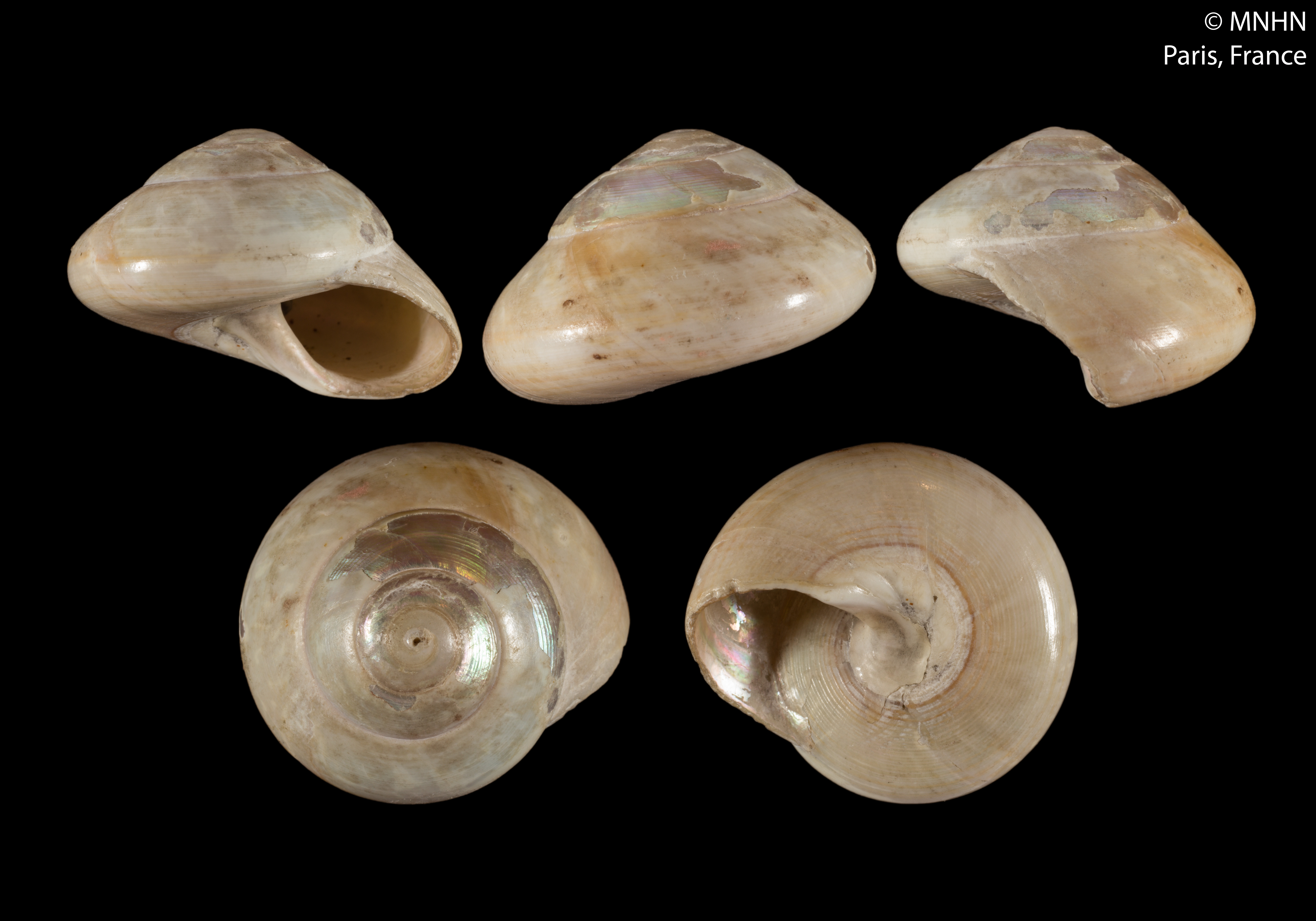
- Shell of Margarita maxima (syntype at MNHN, Paris)

Scientific classification
- Kingdom: Animalia
- Phylum: Mollusca
- Class: Gastropoda
- Subclass: Vetigastropoda
- Order: Trochida
- Superfamily: Trochoidea
- Family: Margaritidae
- Genus: Margarita; Leach, 1819

Type species
- Margarita arctica Leach, 1819

= Margarita (gastropod) =

Genus of gastropods

Margarita is a genus of sea snails, marine gastropod mollusks in the family Margaritidae.

The name of this genus has become invalid as junior homonym of Margarita Leach, 1814 [Bivalvia, Pteriidae], a synonym of Pinctada Röding, 1798. The accepted name is Margarites Gray, 1847.

== Species ==
Species brought into synonymy

- Margarita actinophora Dall, 1890 : synonym of Calliotropis actinophora (Dall, 1890)
- Margarita angulata A. Adams, 1853 : synonym of Peasiella tantilla (Gould, 1849)
- Margarita cumingii A. Adams, 1851: synonym of Broderipia cumingii A. Adams, 1851
- Margarita expansa G.B. Sowerby I, 1838: synonym of Photinula expansa (G.B. Sowerby I, 1838)
- Margarita imperialis Dall, 1881: synonym of Lischkeia imperialis (Dall, 1881)
- Margarita infundibulum : synonym of Calliotropis infundibulum (Watson, 1879)
- Margarita lissocona Dall, 1881: synonym of Calliotropis lissocona (Dall, 1881)
- Margarita marmoreus Pease, 1861: synonym of Calliotrochus marmoreus (Pease, 1861)
- Margarita ponsonbyi Preston, 1908: synonym of Calliotrochus marmoreus (Pease, 1861)
- Margarita regalis Verrill & S. Smith, 1880: synonym of Calliotropis regalis (Verrill & Smith, 1880)
- Margarita striatula (Garrett, 1857): synonym of Calliotrochus marmoreus (Pease, 1861)
- Margarita subantarctica Strebel, 1908: synonym of Margarella subantarctica (Strebel, 1908)
- Margarita tasmanica Tenison-Woods, 1877: synonym of Truncatella scalarina Cox, 1867
- Margarita undulata G.B. Sowerby I, 1838: synonym of Margarites undulata (G.B. Sowerby, I, 1838)

Species inquirenda

- Margarita carinata A. Adams, 1853
- Margarita ianthina Gould, 1861
- Margarita lacazei var. nigricans Vélain, 1877
- Margarita lenticula Gould, 1861
- Margarita maxima G. B. Sowerby II, 1878 (use in recent literature currently undocumented)
- Margarita persica Gould, 1852
- Margarita pulchella Reeve, 1848
- Margarita pulcherrima G. B. Sowerby II, 1878 (use in recent literature currently undocumented)
- Margarita sigaretina G. B. Sowerby I, 1838 (use in recent literature currently undocumented)
- Margarita tessellata A. Adams, 1853
- Margarita variabilis A. Adams, 1853
- Margarita vulgaris G. B. Sowerby I, 1838 (use in recent literature currently undocumented)
