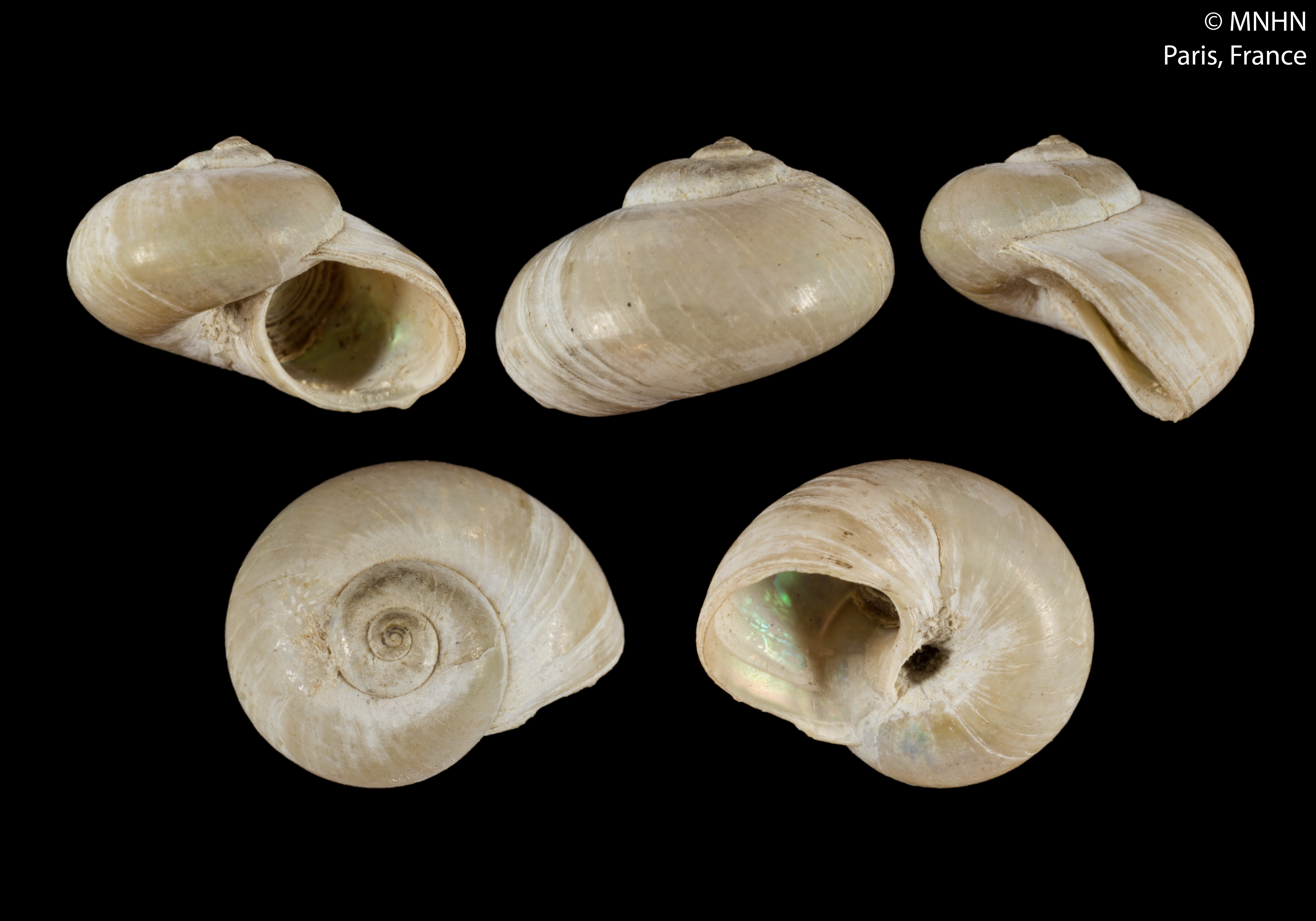
- Shell of Margarella antarctica (syntype at MNHN, Paris)

Scientific classification
- Kingdom: Animalia
- Phylum: Mollusca
- Class: Gastropoda
- Subclass: Vetigastropoda
- Order: Trochida
- Superfamily: Trochoidea
- Family: Calliostomatidae
- Genus: Margarella; Thiele, 1893

Type species
- Margarella expansa G.B. Sowerby I, 1838

Synonyms
- Margaritella Thiele, 1891 (Invalid: junior homonym of Margaritella Meek & Hayden, 1860; Margarella is a replacement name)

= Margarella =

Genus of gastropods

Margarella is a genus of sea snails, marine gastropod molluscs in the subfamily Margarellinae of the family Calliostomatidae.

== Species ==
Species within the genus Margarella include:

- Margarella achilles (Strebel, 1908)
- Margarella antarctica (Lamy, 1905)
- Margarella bouvetia Powell, 1951
- Margarella crebrilirulata (E.A. Smith, 1907)
- Margarella expansa (Sowerby I, 1838)
- Margarella gunnerusensis Numanami, 1996
- Margarella jason A. W. B. Powell, 1951
- Margarella macquariensis Hedley, 1916
- Margarella obsoleta A. W. B. Powell, 1951
- Margarella porcellana A. W. B. Powell, 1951
- Margarella pruinosa (Rochebrune & Mabille, 1885)
- Margarella refulgens (E.A. Smith, 1907)
- † Margarella runcinata Marwick, 1928
- Margarella steineni (Strebel, 1905)
- Margarella subantarctica (Strebel, 1908)
- Margarella tropidophoroides (Strebel, 1908)
- Margarella violacea (King & Broderip, 1832)
- Margarella wacei (Melvill & Standen, 1918)
- Margarella whiteana Linse, 2002

Species brought into synonymy

- Margarella antipoda antipoda (Hombron & Jacquinot, 1854): synonym of Cantharidus antipoda (Hombron & Jacquinot, 1854)
  - Margarella antipoda hinemoa Powell, 1955: synonym of Cantharidus antipoda hinemoa (Powell, 1955)
  - Margarella antipoda puysegurensis Powell, 1939: synonym of Cantharidus antipoda puysegurensis (Powell, 1939)
  - Margarella antipoda rosea (Hutton, 1873): synonym of Cantharidus rosea (Hutton, 1873)
- Margarella fulminata (Hutton, 1873): synonym of Cantharidus fulminatus (Hutton, 1873)
- Margarella hinemoa Powell, 1955: synonym of Cantharidus antipodum (Hombron & Jacquinot, 1848)
- Margarella puysegurensis Powell, 1939: synonym of Cantharidus (Pseudomargarella) puysegurensis (Powell, 1939) represented as Cantharidus puysegurensis (Powell, 1939)
- Margarella turneri Powell, 1939: synonym of Cantharidus turneri (Powell, 1939)
