= C. festivus =

C. festivus may refer to:

- Cantharidus festivus, a sea snail species
- Chlaenius festivus, a ground beetle species
