= Interruptus =

Interruptus may refer to:

- Bromus interruptus, commonly known as the interrupted brome, a plant in the true grass family
- Calliostoma interruptus, a species of sea snail, a marine gastropod mollusk in the family Calliostomatidae
- Devario interruptus, very similar to Devario shanensis
- Eristalis interruptus, a European species of hoverfly
- Melanochromis interruptus, a species of fish in the family Cichlidae
- Nicrophorus interruptus, a burying beetle described by Stephens in 1830
- Passalus interruptus, a beetle of the family Passalidae
- Polypogon interruptus, commonly known as ditch beard grass, is a species of grass
- Uraeotyphlus interruptus, a species of caecilian found in India

== See also ==
- Coitus interruptus, birth-control technique in which a man withdraws his penis from a woman prior to ejaculation during intercourse
