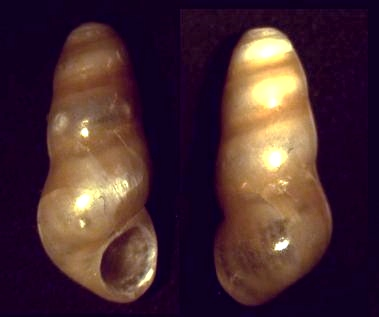
- Two shells of Halistylus columna

Scientific classification
- Kingdom: Animalia
- Phylum: Mollusca
- Class: Gastropoda
- Subclass: Vetigastropoda
- Order: Trochida
- Superfamily: Trochoidea
- Family: Trochidae
- Genus: Halistylus; Dall, 1890

Type species
- Cantharidus columna Dall, 1890

= Halistylus =

Genus of gastropods

Halistylus is a genus of very small sea snails, marine gastropod mollusks in the family Trochidae, the top snails.

== Description ==
The small, polychromatic shell has a cylindrical shape. It is holostomatous, i.e. the aperture is rounded or entire, uninterrupted by the siphonal canal, notch, or by any other extension. The operculum is multispiral and coriaceous. There is no spiral sculpture. Such a cylindrical shape is rather uncommon in the family Trochidae. But the belonging of this genus to this family is certified by the shell structure, the pearly aperture and anatomical features.

This genus was previously considered a subgenus of the genus Cantharidus Montfort

== Species ==
Species within the genus Halistylus include:

- Halistylus columna (Dall, 1890)
- Halistylus genecoani McLean, 1984
- Halistylus pupoideus (Carpenter, 1864)

Species brought into synonymy

- Halistylus circumstriatus Pilsbry, H.A., 1897: synonym of Halistylus columna (Dall, 1890)
- Halistylus pupoides: synonym of Halistylus pupoideus (Carpenter, 1864)
