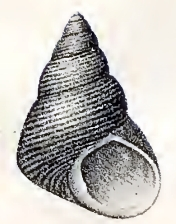
- Drawing of a shell of Cantharidus capillaceus

Scientific classification
- Kingdom: Animalia
- Phylum: Mollusca
- Class: Gastropoda
- Subclass: Vetigastropoda
- Order: Trochida
- Superfamily: Trochoidea
- Family: Trochidae
- Genus: Cantharidus
- Species: C. capillaceus

Binomial name
- Cantharidus capillaceus (Philippi, 1848)

Synonyms
- Cantharidus (Plumbelenchus) coruscans (Hedley, 1916); Cantharidus coruscans (Hedley, 1916); Cantharidus pruninus (Gould, 1849); Cantharidus pruninus minor E. A. Smith, 1902; Cantharidus pruninus perobtusus Pilsbry, H.A., 1889; Cantharidus zealandicus A. Adams, 1853; Micrelenchus (Plumbelenchus) capillaceus (Philippi, 1849); Micrelenchus capillaceus (Philippi, 1849); Photinula coruscans Hedley, 1916; Plumbelenchus coruscans Hedley, C., 1916; Trochus capillaceus Philippi, 1848; Trochus episcopus Hombron & Jacquinot; Trochus pruninus Gould, 1849

= Cantharidus capillaceus =

Species of gastropod

Cantharidus capillaceus is a species of sea snail, a marine gastropod mollusc in the family Trochidae, the top snails.

== Subspecies ==
Former subspecies within this species included:

- Cantharidus capillaceus capillaceus, the nominate subspecies
- Cantharidus capillaceus coruscans (Hedley, 1916): synonym of Cantharidus capillaceus

== Description ==
The length of the shell varies between 13 mm and 28 mm. The imperforate shell has an ovate-conical shape. It is nearly smooth. Its sculpture consists of very fine dense spiral striae, leaving narrow and shallow grooves between them, sometimes nearly obsolete.

Colour: deep purple or reddish-grey, sometimes with a few white dots. The apex is usually pink. The epidermis is thin, often shining, easily rubbed off.

The spire is conical. Its sides are slightly convex. The apex is subacute. The protoconch is conoidal, consisting of 3 convex spirally striate whorls. The whorls number 6 to 7. They are slightly convex, the last rounded or obtusely angular. The base of the shell is flatly convex. The suture is linear, slightly impressed. The aperture is less than one-half the length of the shell. It is ovate, oblique, iridescent within and lirate. The outer lip is convex, effuse on meeting the basal lip, with a sharp, finely denticulate edge. The columella is subvertical, with a slight swelling in the middle. The inner lip is expanded in a callous pad over the umbilical tract. There is a thin callus on the parietal wall.

== Distribution ==
This marine species endemic to New Zealand and occurs off Auckland and the Campbell Islands.
