= Margarella gunnerusensis =

Scientific classification
- Kingdom: Animalia
- Phylum: Mollusca
- Class: Gastropoda
- Subclass: Vetigastropoda
- Order: Trochida
- Superfamily: Trochoidea
- Family: Calliostomatidae
- Genus: Margarella
- Species: M. gunnerusensis

Binomial name
- Margarella gunnerusensis Numanami, 1996

Species of gastropod

Margarella gunnerusensis is a species of sea snail, a marine gastropod mollusk in the family Calliostomatidae.
