= Photinula crawshayi =

Scientific classification
- Kingdom: Animalia
- Phylum: Mollusca
- Class: Gastropoda
- Subclass: Vetigastropoda
- Order: Trochida
- Family: Calliostomatidae
- Subfamily: Calliostomatinae
- Genus: Photinula
- Species: P. crawshayi

Binomial name
- Photinula crawshayi E. A. Smith, 1905

Species of gastropod

Photinula crawshayi is a species of sea snail, a marine gastropod mollusk in the family Calliostomatidae.
