= Halistylus genecoani =

Scientific classification
- Kingdom: Animalia
- Phylum: Mollusca
- Class: Gastropoda
- Subclass: Vetigastropoda
- Order: Trochida
- Superfamily: Trochoidea
- Family: Trochidae
- Genus: Halistylus
- Species: H. genecoani

Binomial name
- Halistylus genecoani McLean, 1984

Species of gastropod

Halistylus genecoani is a species of sea snail, a marine gastropod mollusk in the family Trochidae, the top snails.

== Distribution ==
This species occurs in the Pacific Ocean off Baja California, Mexico.
