= Cantharidus crenelliferus =

Scientific classification
- Kingdom: Animalia
- Phylum: Mollusca
- Class: Gastropoda
- Subclass: Vetigastropoda
- Order: Trochida
- Superfamily: Trochoidea
- Family: Trochidae
- Genus: Cantharidus
- Species: C. crenelliferus

Binomial name
- Cantharidus crenelliferus (A. Adams, 1851)

Synonyms
- Jujubinus crenelliferus (A. Adams, 1853); Thalotia crenellifera Adams, 1851

Species of gastropod

Cantharidus crenelliferus is a species of sea snail, a marine gastropod mollusk in the family Trochidae, the top snails.

== Description ==
The height of the shell attains 10 mm. The imperforate shell has an elevated conical shape. It is reddish with red spots. The acuminate spire has a red apex. The planulate whorls with packed lirae, that are crenulate and transverse. The sutures are obliquely striate. The body whorl is subangulate. The base of the shell is slightly convex. The aperture is subquadrate with a white interior. The white columella is curved and truncated at its base.

== Distribution ==
This marine species is endemic to Australia; it occurs off Queensland.
