= Margarella jason =

Scientific classification
- Kingdom: Animalia
- Phylum: Mollusca
- Class: Gastropoda
- Subclass: Vetigastropoda
- Order: Trochida
- Superfamily: Trochoidea
- Family: Calliostomatidae
- Genus: Margarella
- Species: M. jason

Binomial name
- Margarella jason A. W. B. Powell, 1951

Species of gastropod

Margarella jason is a species of sea snail, a marine gastropod mollusk in the family Calliostomatidae.

== Description ==
The height of the shell attains 10 mm.

== Distribution ==
This marine species occurs off the South Georgia Islands at depths between 238 m and 270 m.
