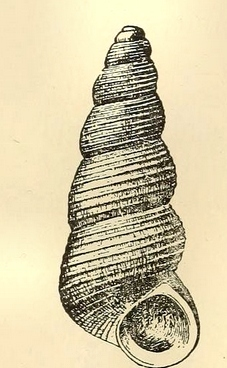
- Drawing of a shell of Halistylus pupoideus

Scientific classification
- Kingdom: Animalia
- Phylum: Mollusca
- Class: Gastropoda
- Subclass: Vetigastropoda
- Order: Trochida
- Superfamily: Trochoidea
- Family: Trochidae
- Genus: Halistylus
- Species: H. pupoideus

Binomial name
- Halistylus pupoideus (Carpenter, 1864)

Synonyms
- Fenella pupoidea Carpenter, 1864; Halistylus pupoides (misspelling)

= Halistylus pupoideus =

Species of gastropod

Halistylus pupoideus is a species of sea snail, a marine gastropod mollusk in the family Trochidae, the top snails.

This species has been misspelled Halistylus pupoides in the 19th century literature.

== Description ==
The shell grows to a length of 6 mm. This species occurs invariably with Caecum crebricinctum Carpenter, 1864. Both species have the same variantions in color. The very small shell is high-spired with a cylindrical shape. Its color varies between yellow to reddish-brown with some dark axial streaks. The slightly convex whorls are smooth, but show, under magnification, numerous, very fine spiral threads. This species shows great variations in strength and spacing of the spiral cords with, in some specimens, the major cords more prominent than normal. As typical for this genus, there is no umbilicus. The subcircular aperture has a pearly appearance. It shows a rounded, thickened lip.

== Distribution ==
This species occurs in the Pacific Ocean from Alaska to Panama. It is seldom found off California, but rather plentiful off British Columbia.
