= Cantharidus pallidulus =

Scientific classification
- Kingdom: Animalia
- Phylum: Mollusca
- Class: Gastropoda
- Subclass: Vetigastropoda
- Order: Trochida
- Superfamily: Trochoidea
- Family: Trochidae
- Genus: Cantharidus
- Species: C. pallidulus

Binomial name
- Cantharidus pallidulus A. Adams, 1851

Species of gastropod

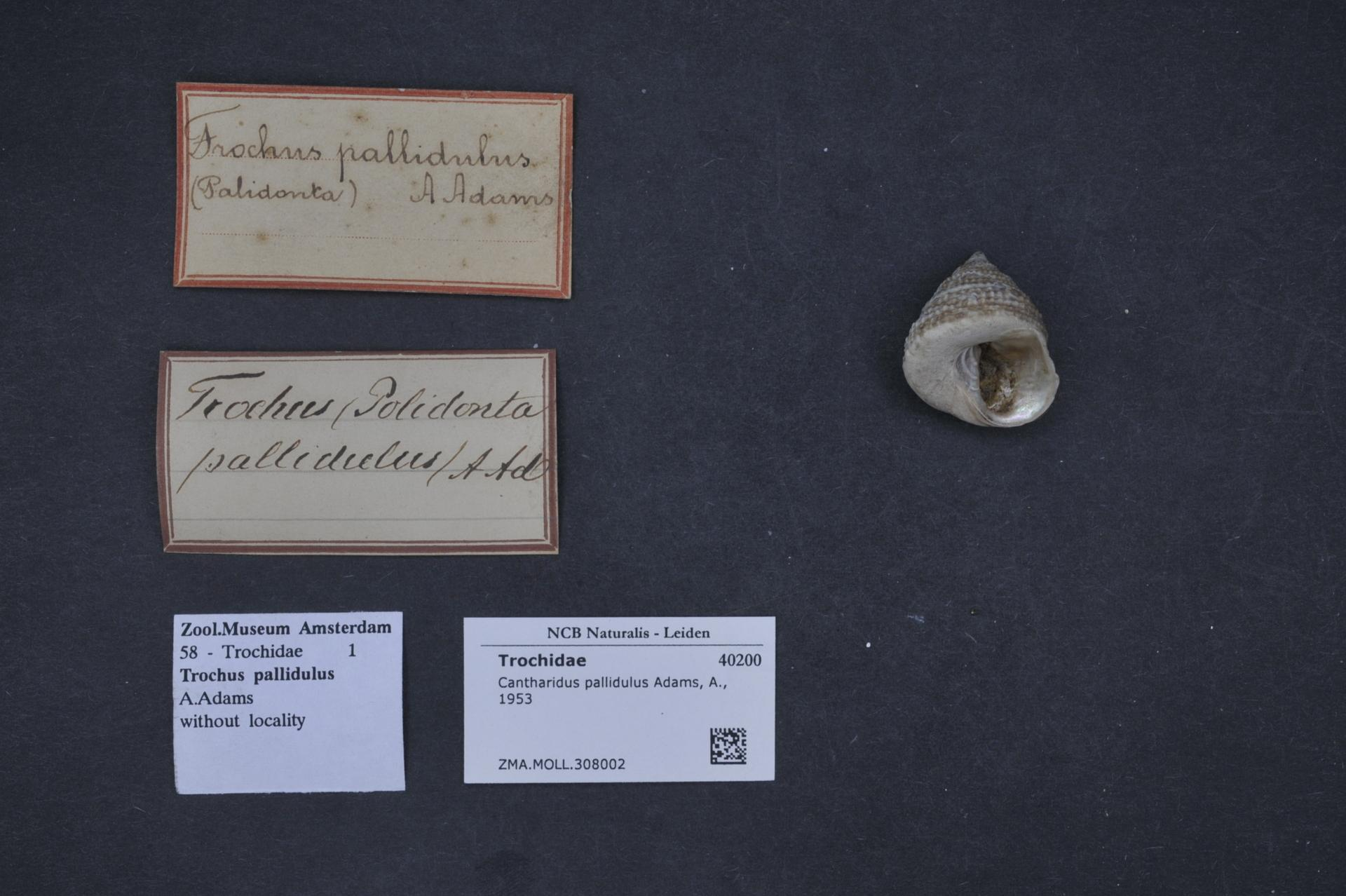

Cantharidus pallidulus is a species of sea snail, a marine gastropod mollusk in the family Trochidae, the top snails.

== Description ==
The imperforate shell has an elevated conical shape. The ribs are transversely elevated with golden yellow colors. The columella is almost straight and somewhat swollen in the middle. The lip shows some ridges within.

== Distribution ==
This marine species is endemic to Australia.
