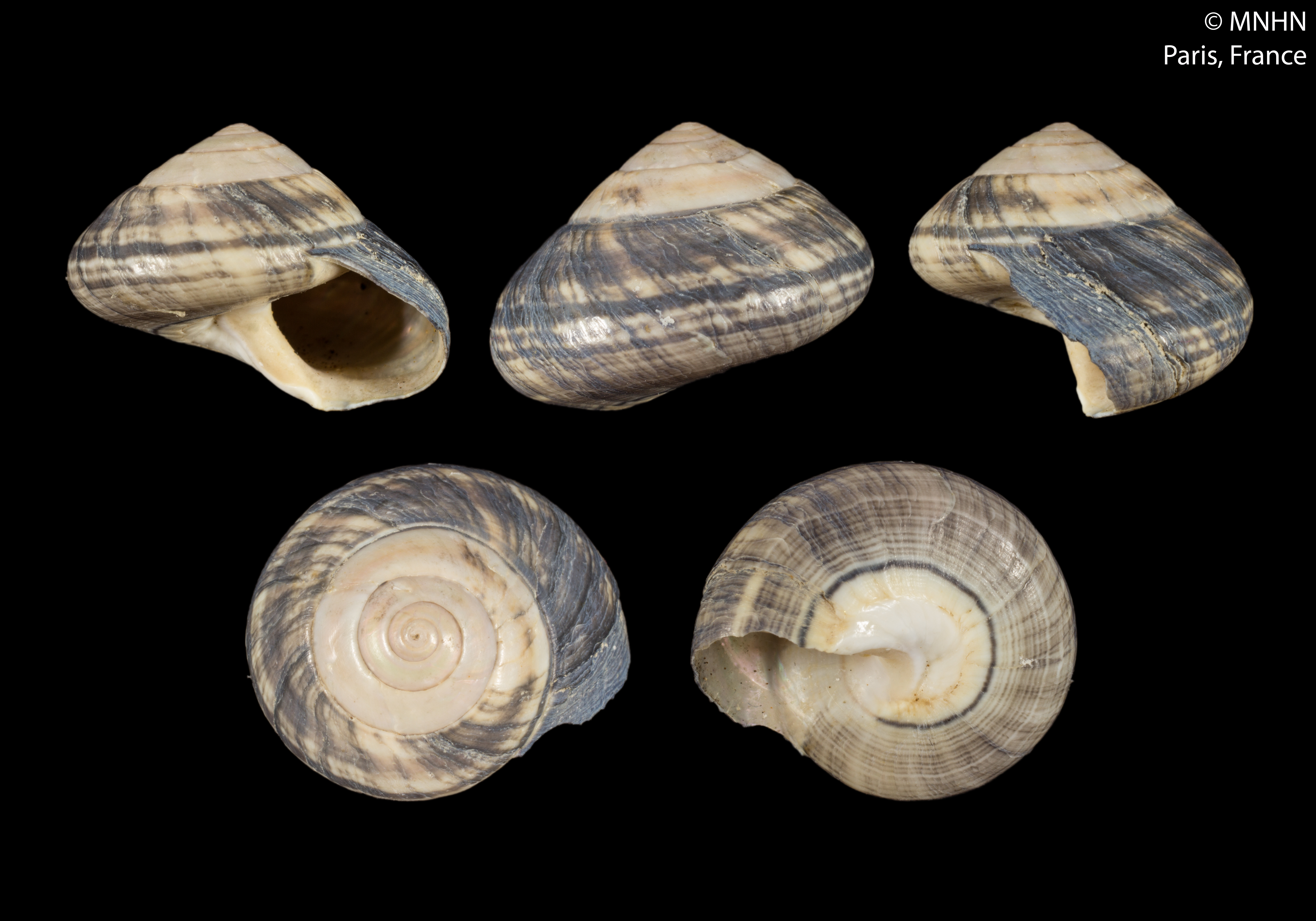

Scientific classification
- Kingdom: Animalia
- Phylum: Mollusca
- Class: Gastropoda
- Subclass: Vetigastropoda
- Order: Trochida
- Family: Calliostomatidae
- Subfamily: Calliostomatinae
- Genus: Photinula
- Species: P. coerulescens

Binomial name
- Photinula coerulescens (King & Broderip, 1832)

Synonyms
- Margarita coerulescens P. P. King, 1832 (original combination); Margarita maxima Hombron & Jacquinot, 1848 (treated by P. Fischer as a secondary homonym of Trochus maximus Koch, 1844; Trochus hombroni is a replacement name); Photinula couteaudi Mabille & Rochebrune, 1889; Trochus hombroni P. Fischer, 1878; Trochus lineatus Philippi, 1845 (not Trochus lineatus da Costa, 1778)

= Photinula coerulescens =

Species of gastropod

Photinula coerulescens is a species of sea snail, a marine gastropod mollusk in the family Calliostomatidae.

== Description ==
The length of the shell attains 22.5 mm.

== Distribution ==
This marine species occurs off Patagonia (in South America, including the coasts of Argentina, the Strait of Magellan, the Falkland Islands, and South Georgia.).
