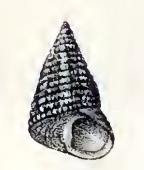
- Drawing of a shell of Cantharidus fournieri

Scientific classification
- Kingdom: Animalia
- Phylum: Mollusca
- Class: Gastropoda
- Subclass: Vetigastropoda
- Order: Trochida
- Superfamily: Trochoidea
- Family: Trochidae
- Genus: Cantharidus
- Species: C. fournieri

Binomial name
- Cantharidus fournieri (Crosse, 1863)

Synonyms
- Trochus fournieri Crosse, 1863

= Cantharidus fournieri =

Species of gastropod

Cantharidus fournieri is a species of sea snail, a marine gastropod mollusk in the family Trochidae, the top snails.

== Description ==
The shell grows to a length of 9 mm, its diameter 6 mm. The small, imperforate shell has an acutely elongate-conical shape. It is brown or olivaceous, unicolored or punctate or maculate with white. The spire is straightly conical. The apex is acute. The sutures are linear. The about 8 whorls are flat, very finely, evenly, densely spirally striate, the stride sometimes subdecussated by delicate oblique growth-lines. The body whorl is carinate at the periphery. The base of the shell is coarsely lirate, lirae about 9 in number. The aperture is small, quadrangular, and smooth within. The lip is acute, bordered inside by a wide porcellanous band. The throat is nacreous, brilliant green. The columella is straight and scarcely truncate at its base.

== Distribution ==
This marine species occurs in the Indo-Pacific and off New Caledonia.
