= Margarella obsoleta =

Scientific classification
- Kingdom: Animalia
- Phylum: Mollusca
- Class: Gastropoda
- Subclass: Vetigastropoda
- Order: Trochida
- Superfamily: Trochoidea
- Family: Calliostomatidae
- Genus: Margarella
- Species: M. obsoleta

Binomial name
- Margarella obsoleta A. W. B. Powell, 1951

Synonyms
- Margarella (Promargarita) tropidophoroides obsoleta A. W. B. Powell, 1951 (basionym); Margarella tropidophoroides obsoleta Powell, 1951; Photinula carinata Lamy, 1911

Species of gastropod

Margarella obsoleta is a species of sea snail, a marine gastropod mollusk in the family Calliostomatidae.

== Distribution ==
This marine species occurs in subantarctic waters off South Georgia.
