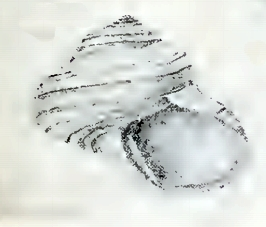
- Photinasta taeniatum

Scientific classification
- Kingdom: Animalia
- Phylum: Mollusca
- Class: Gastropoda
- Subclass: Vetigastropoda
- Order: Trochida
- Superfamily: Trochoidea
- Family: Calliostomatidae
- Genus: Photinastoma; Powell, 1951

= Photinastoma =

Genus of gastropods

Photinastoma is a genus of sea snails, marine gastropod mollusks in the family Calliostomatidae within the superfamily Trochoidea, the top snails, turban snails and their allies.

== Description ==
Unlike the other genera in the family Calliostomatidae, the genus Photinastoma has almost smooth shells, lacking the beaded sculpture. The protoconch is large, and there are some strong spiral cords in the early teleoconch.

== Species ==
Species within the genus Photinastoma include:

- Photinastoma taeniatum Sowerby I, 1825
