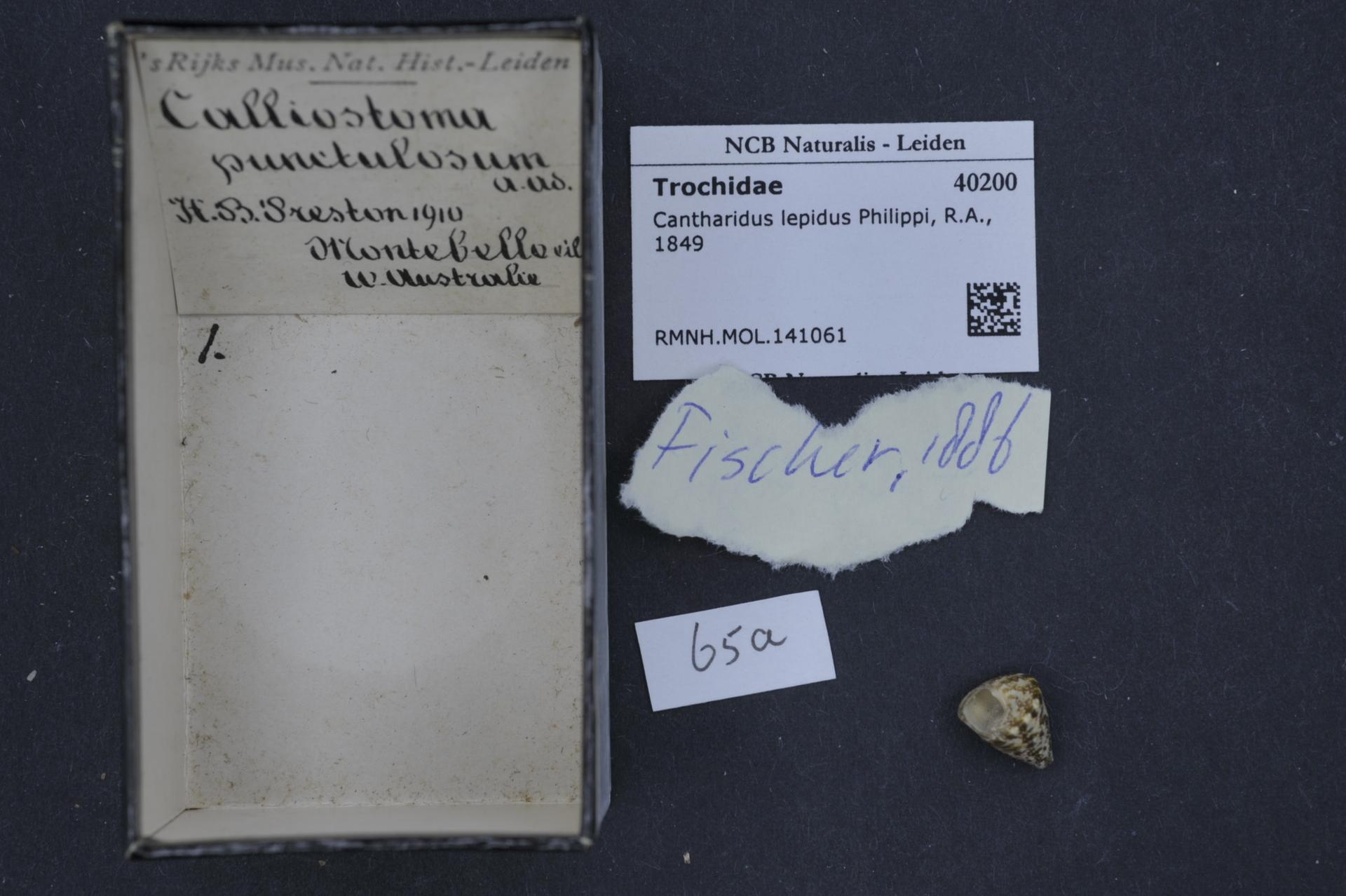
- Cantharidus lepidus shell specimen from the Naturalis Biodiversity Center in Leiden, Netherlands

Scientific classification
- Kingdom: Animalia
- Phylum: Mollusca
- Class: Gastropoda
- Subclass: Vetigastropoda
- Order: Trochida
- Superfamily: Trochoidea
- Family: Trochidae
- Genus: Cantharidus
- Species: C. lepidus

Binomial name
- Cantharidus lepidus (Philippi, 1849)

Synonyms
- Strigosella lepida (Philippi, 1849); Jujubinus lepidus (Philippi, 1849); Trochus lepidus Philippi, 1849 (original combination); Trochus erogatus P. Fischer, 1876

= Cantharidus lepidus =

Species of gastropod

Cantharidus lepidus is a species of sea snail, a marine gastropod mollusc in the family Trochidae, the top snails.
