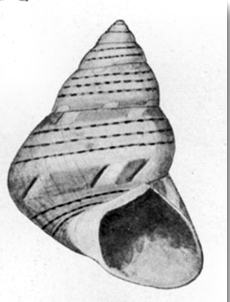
- Original drawing of a shell of Cantharidus bisbalteatus

Scientific classification
- Kingdom: Animalia
- Phylum: Mollusca
- Class: Gastropoda
- Subclass: Vetigastropoda
- Order: Trochida
- Superfamily: Trochoidea
- Family: Trochidae
- Genus: Cantharidus
- Species: C. bisbalteatus

Binomial name
- Cantharidus bisbalteatus H. Pilsbry, 1901

= Cantharidus bisbalteatus =

Species of gastropod

Cantharidus bisbalteatus is a species of sea snail, a marine gastropod mollusk in the family Trochidae, the top snails.

== Description ==
The height of the shell attains 12.5 mm, its diameter 9 mm. The imperforate or minutely rimate, glossy shell has an elevated conical shape. It is encircled by a crimson or scarlet belt at the periphery and another bordering the suture below, continuous or interrupted by white streaks or spots, and roseate around the umbilical tract. The intervening spaces are somewhat olivaceous, with a few narrow spirals of alternate blue or white and red-brown dots. Two or three of these spiral lines ascend the spire. Its sculpture consists of slight growth lines and fainter or wholly obsolete fine spiral striae above, and about 6 fine-spaced grooves around the umbilical region, stronger toward the middle. The conic spire has an acute apex. The about 6½ whorls are quite convex. They are separated by an impressed suture. The body whorl is subangular at the periphery and convex beneath. The aperture is oblique, rounded rhombic, pearly and iridescent within, with green, or green and red reflections. It scarcely shows any appearance of sulcation. The white columella is concave above, somewhat straightened in the middle. The white columellar area is excavated.

== Distribution ==
This marine species occurs off Japan
