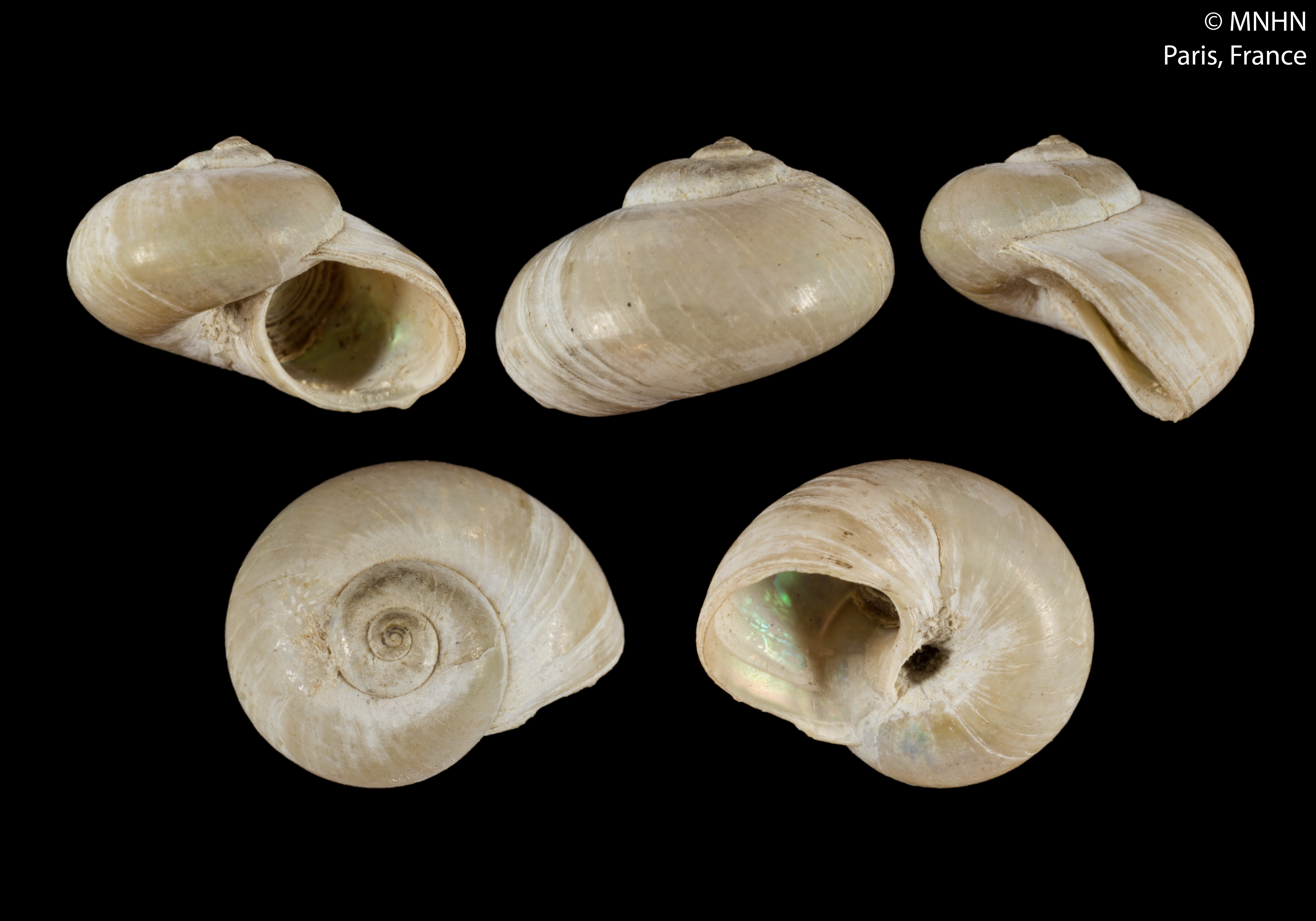
- shell of Margarella antarctica (syntype at MNHN, Paris)

Scientific classification
- Kingdom: Animalia
- Phylum: Mollusca
- Class: Gastropoda
- Subclass: Vetigastropoda
- Order: Trochida
- Family: Calliostomatidae
- Genus: Margarella
- Species: M. antarctica

Binomial name
- Margarella antarctica (Lamy, 1905)

Synonyms
- Margarella antarctica Powell, 1951; Margarita antarctica Lamy, 1905 (basionym); Valvatella antarctica (Lamy, 1905)

= Margarella antarctica =

Species of gastropod

Margarella antarctica is a species of sea snail, a marine gastropod mollusk in the family Calliostomatidae, the top snails.

== Distribution ==
This marine species occurs off the South Orkney Islands, the South Shetland Islands, the Antarctic Peninsula, and the Bellingshausen Sea.

== Description ==
It is orange-yellow, with two pairs of cephalic tentacles with large black eyes. The shell is small, and wider than it is high. The orbicular, deeply umbilicated shell has an obtuse-conical shape. It contains four convex whorls, the last of which is adorned only by growth lines. The oblique aperture is sub-circular and pearly inside. In, adults its edges are joined by a callus . The operculum is polygyrous spiral. The color of the shell is bluish gray or greenish. The maximum recorded shell length is 12.5 mm.

== Habitat ==
Minimum recorded depth is 0 m. Maximum recorded depth is 24 m.
