= Margarella refulgens =

Scientific classification
- Kingdom: Animalia
- Phylum: Mollusca
- Class: Gastropoda
- Subclass: Vetigastropoda
- Order: Trochida
- Superfamily: Trochoidea
- Family: Calliostomatidae
- Genus: Margarella
- Species: M. refulgens

Binomial name
- Margarella refulgens (E.A. Smith, 1907)

Synonyms
- Margarella expansa J. Gaillard, 1954; Margarites refulgens (E. A. Smith, 1907); Valvatella refulgens E. A. Smith, 1907

Species of gastropod

Margarella refulgens is a species of sea snail, a marine gastropod mollusk in the family Calliostomatidae.

== Description ==
The length of the shell varies between 4 mm and 11 mm.

== Distribution ==
This marine species occurs off the South Sandwich Islands and in the Weddell Sea, Antarctica, at depths between 202 m and 1,108 m.
