= Margarella bouvetia =

Scientific classification
- Kingdom: Animalia
- Phylum: Mollusca
- Class: Gastropoda
- Subclass: Vetigastropoda
- Order: Trochida
- Family: Calliostomatidae
- Genus: Margarella
- Species: M. bouvetia

Binomial name
- Margarella bouvetia Powell, 1951

Species of gastropod

Margarella bouvetia is a species of sea snail, a marine gastropod mollusk in the family Calliostomatidae, the top snails.

== Distribution ==
This species occurs in Antarctic waters.
