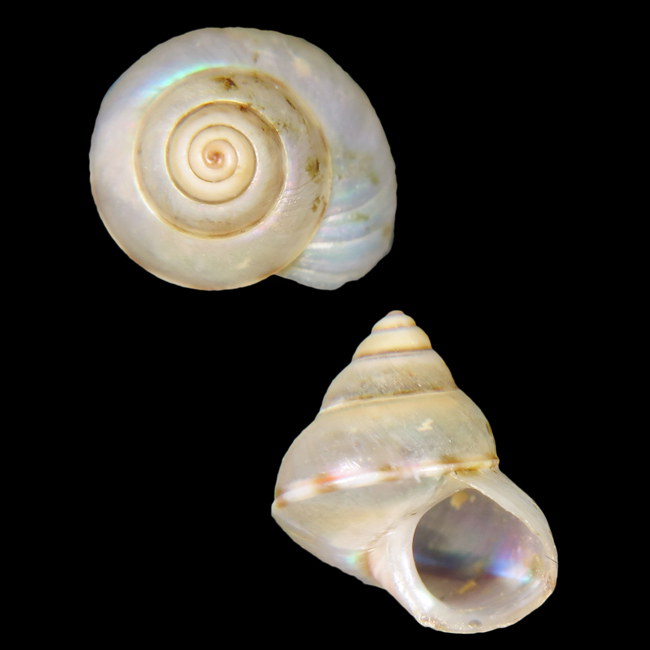

Scientific classification
- Kingdom: Animalia
- Phylum: Mollusca
- Class: Gastropoda
- Subclass: Vetigastropoda
- Order: Trochida
- Superfamily: Trochoidea
- Family: Trochidae
- Genus: Cantharidus
- Species: C. nolfi

Binomial name
- Cantharidus nolfi Poppe, Tagaro & Dekker, 2006

= Cantharidus nolfi =

Species of gastropod

Cantharidus nolfi is a species of sea snail, a marine gastropod mollusk in the family Trochidae, the top snails.

== Description ==
SeaLifeBase gives only a general life cycle for the order Archaeogastropoda: its members are mostly broadcast spawners, and their embryos develop into planktonic trochophore larvae, then juvenile veligers, before becoming adults.

== Distribution ==
This marine species occurs off the Philippines.
