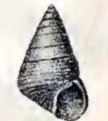
- Drawing of a shell of Cantharidus marmoreus

Scientific classification
- Kingdom: Animalia
- Phylum: Mollusca
- Class: Gastropoda
- Subclass: Vetigastropoda
- Order: Trochida
- Superfamily: Trochoidea
- Family: Trochidae
- Genus: Cantharidus
- Species: C. marmoreus

Binomial name
- Cantharidus marmoreus (Pease, 1868)

Synonyms
- Calliostoma mamoreum (Pease, 1868); Trochus marmoreus Pease, 1868 (original description)

= Cantharidus marmoreus =

Species of gastropod

Cantharidus marmoreus is a species of sea snail, a marine gastropod mollusk in the family Trochidae, the top snails.

== Description ==
The height of the shell attains 8 mm, its diameter 5 mm. The rather solid shell has an elongate-conical shape. It is imperforate, but with a groove and pit or even a slight perforation at the place of the umbilicus. It is whitish, longitudinally clouded with brown or pink, often showing white opaque scattered dots. The surface is polished. The sculpture consists of numerous broad flat smooth spirals, separated by impressed lines. There are seven of these flat spiral ribs on the upper surface of the body whorl, the peripheral one larger. The base of the shell has numerous concentric striae, and about 4 spaced, more impressed grooves. The spire is high with its lateral outlines nearly straight . There are about 8 whorls, each one a trifle convex, the last angular at the periphery. The base of the shell is a little convex. The aperture is quadrate. The columella is vertical and obliquely truncate at its base.

== Distribution ==
This species occurs in the Pacific Ocean off the Tuamotu Islands.
