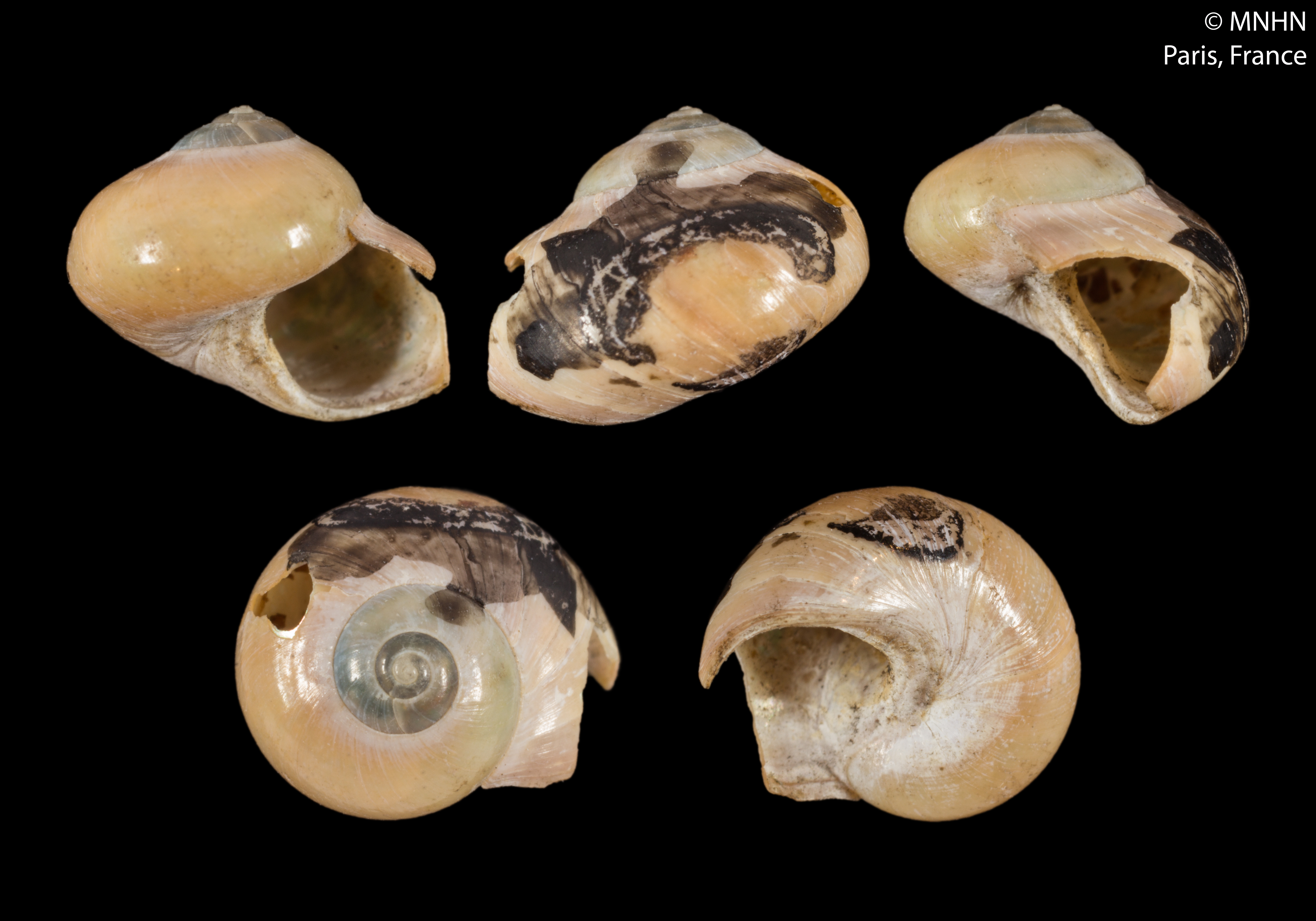
- Shell of Cantharidus antipodum (syntype at MNHN, Paris)

Scientific classification
- Kingdom: Animalia
- Phylum: Mollusca
- Class: Gastropoda
- Subclass: Vetigastropoda
- Order: Trochida
- Superfamily: Trochoidea
- Family: Trochidae
- Genus: Cantharidus
- Species: C. antipodum

Binomial name
- Cantharidus antipodum (Hombron & Jacquinot, 1854)

Synonyms
- Cantharidus (Pseudomargarella) antipodum (Hombron & Jacquinot, 1854)· accepted, alternate representation; Cantharidus antipodum antipodum (Hombron & Jacquinot, 1848); Cantharidus antipodum hinemoa (Powell, 1955); Cantharidus roseus (Hutton, 1873); Chrysostoma rosea Hutton, 1873 (basionym); Gibbula antipoda (Hombron & Jacquinot, 1854); Margarella antipoda (Hombron & Jacquinot, 1854); Margarella antipoda antipoda (Hombron & Jacquinot, 1848); Margarella antipoda hinemoa Powell, 1955; Margarella antipoda rosea (Hutton, 1873); Margarella hinemoa Powell, 1955; Margarita antipoda Hombron & Jacquinot, 1854 (original description); Photinula antipoda (Hombron & Jacquinot, 1854); Photinula decepta Odhner, N.H.J., 1924

= Cantharidus antipodum =

Species of gastropod

Cantharidus antipodum is a species of sea snail, a marine gastropod mollusk in the family Trochidae, the top snails.

== Description ==
The length of the shell varies between 4 mm and 8 mm. The smooth, shining shell has a globose-conic shape. The small shell is composed of four to five convex whorls, the two first very small, convex and depressed; the others very large. The sutures are linear. The body whorl is angled or rounded at the periphery. The base of the shell is slightly convex and impressed in the middle. The height of the spire is a little less than that of the aperture. The shell is subperforate or imperforate and contains a few distant fine spiral lirae, visible only under a good lens, more distinct on the base, and very fine close growth lines. The large aperture is round, acute on the left, and with a flat border on the right margin. Its inside is smooth and highly iridescent. The umbilicus is only indicated and nearly covered by the convex, sharp outer lip. The columella is subvertical, arcuate, simple, slightly expanded and nearly covering the umbilicus. The shell is purplish-black. The upper whorls are iridescent, mostly with dark red spiral bands or green transverse bands, 1 or 2 on the spire whorls, 4 to 5 on the body whorl. Sometimes there are a number of whitish zigzag bands near the aperture. The epidermis is very thin and shining.

(Description of Cantharidus roseus) The length of the shell varies between 4 mm and 12 mm. It grazes on kelp. The small, imperforate, thin, fragile shell has a globosely conoidal shape. Its sculpture consists of very finely spirally striated, with 30 striations on the penultimate whorl and obscured on the body whorl by growth lines. The colour is variable and typical. The 2 apical whorls are white or pinkish-white, on the third whorl 2 purplish bands equidistant from the sutures arise. The 4th whorl is wholly purplish-black, as is the body whorl. In some shells these bands persist on to the last 2 whorls. Additional bands arise so that on the body whorl 5 distinct bands can be counted. Rarely additional minute bands can be seen between these principal bands. In some cases the purple on the last whorl breaks up into irregular dashes. The shells found at ShagPoint are mostly light-coloured. Some have almost a white ground colour, with 5 separate distant bands. Others have a pinkish ground colour, with darker markings between the principal bands. Whilst in some the bands on the body whorl are broken up into dots.

The spire is very short. and contains five whorls. The body whorl is very large, rapidly descending. The suture is distinctly marked. The aperture is large and round. The outer lip is thin, edged with a thin band of white, inside iridescent. The columella is subvertical, semicurved, expanding as a callus over the umbilicus.

== Distribution ==
This marine species occurs off the subantarctic islands of New Zealand.

== Subspecies ==
- Cantharidus antipodum antipodum' (Hombron & Jacquinot, 1854): synonym of Cantharidus antipodum (Hombron & Jacquinot, 1848)
- Cantharidus antipoda hinemoa (Powell, 1955): synonym of Cantharidus antipodum (Hombron & Jacquinot, 1848)
- Cantharidus antipoda puysegurensis (Powell, 1939): synonym of Cantharidus puysegurensis (Powell, 1939)
