= Margarella whiteana =

Scientific classification
- Kingdom: Animalia
- Phylum: Mollusca
- Class: Gastropoda
- Subclass: Vetigastropoda
- Order: Trochida
- Family: Calliostomatidae
- Genus: Margarella
- Species: M. whiteana

Binomial name
- Margarella whiteana Linse, 2002

Species of gastropod

Margarella whiteana is a species of sea snail, a marine gastropod mollusk in the family Calliostomatidae, the top snails.

== Distribution ==
This marine species occurs off the Antarctic Peninsula at depths between 3 m and 28 m.

== Description ==
The animal itself is a pale yellow in color. It has two pairs of short cephalic tentacles with large black eyes on the posterior side of the tentacles.

The shell is small, and wider than it is tall, at up to 7.6mm in height and 8.7 in diameter. The shell is covered in many spiral ribs, and lacks a periostracum. The maximum recorded shell length is 8.7 mm.

== Habitat ==
Minimum recorded depth is 3 m. Maximum recorded depth is 28 m.
