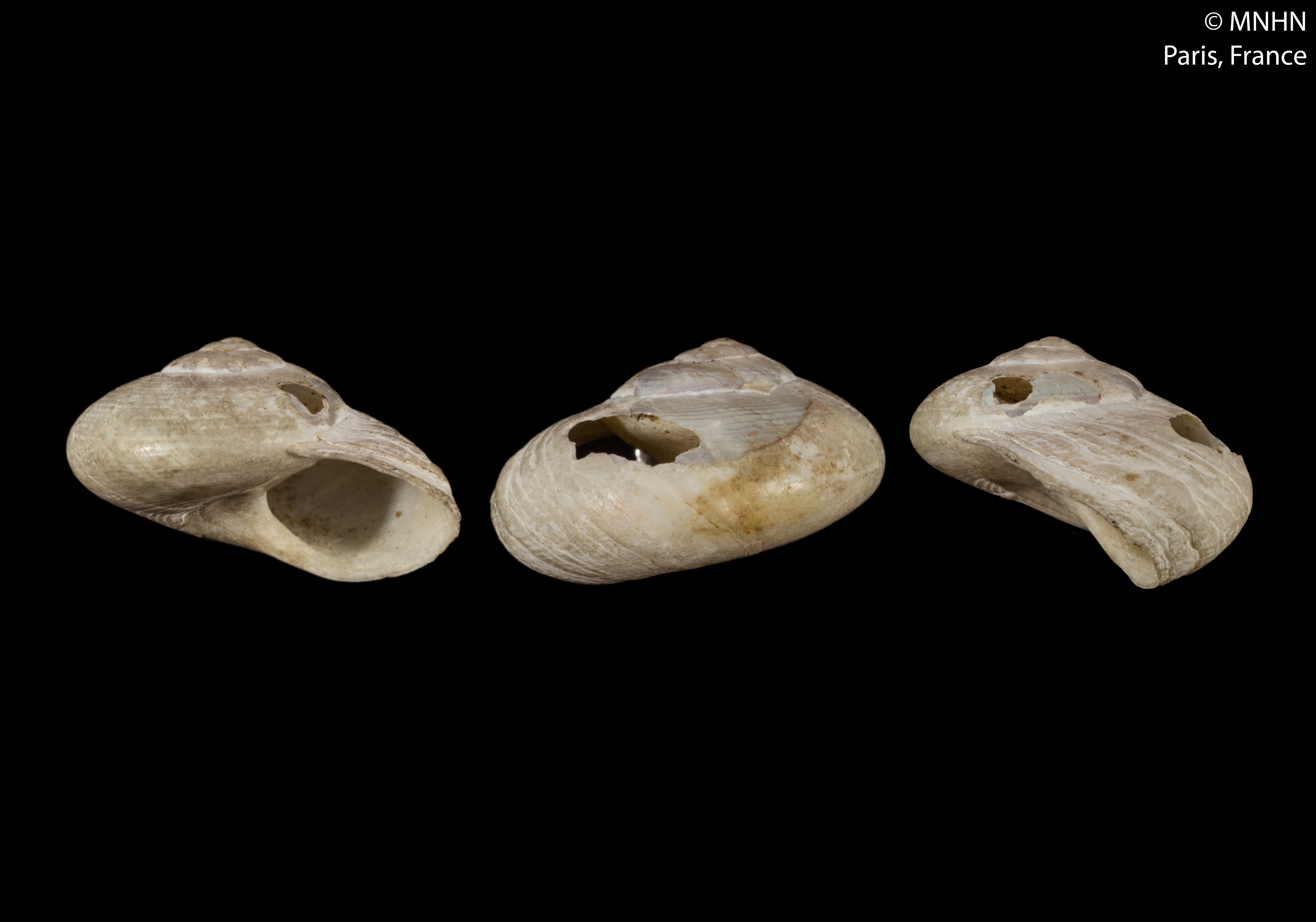
- Photinula virginalis

Scientific classification
- Kingdom: Animalia
- Phylum: Mollusca
- Class: Gastropoda
- Subclass: Vetigastropoda
- Order: Trochida
- Superfamily: Trochoidea
- Family: Calliostomatidae
- Subfamily: Calliostomatinae
- Genus: Photinula
- Species: P. virginalis

Binomial name
- Photinula virginalis Rochebrune & Mabille, 1885

Synonyms
- Photinula viaginalis Rochebrune & Mabille, 1885

= Photinula virginalis =

Species of gastropod

Photinula virginalis is a species of sea snail, a marine gastropod mollusk, in the family Calliostomatidae within the superfamily Trochoidea, the top snails, turban snails and their allies.

== Description ==
The length of the shell attains 17.3 mm.

== Distribution ==
This marine species occurs off Patagonia.
