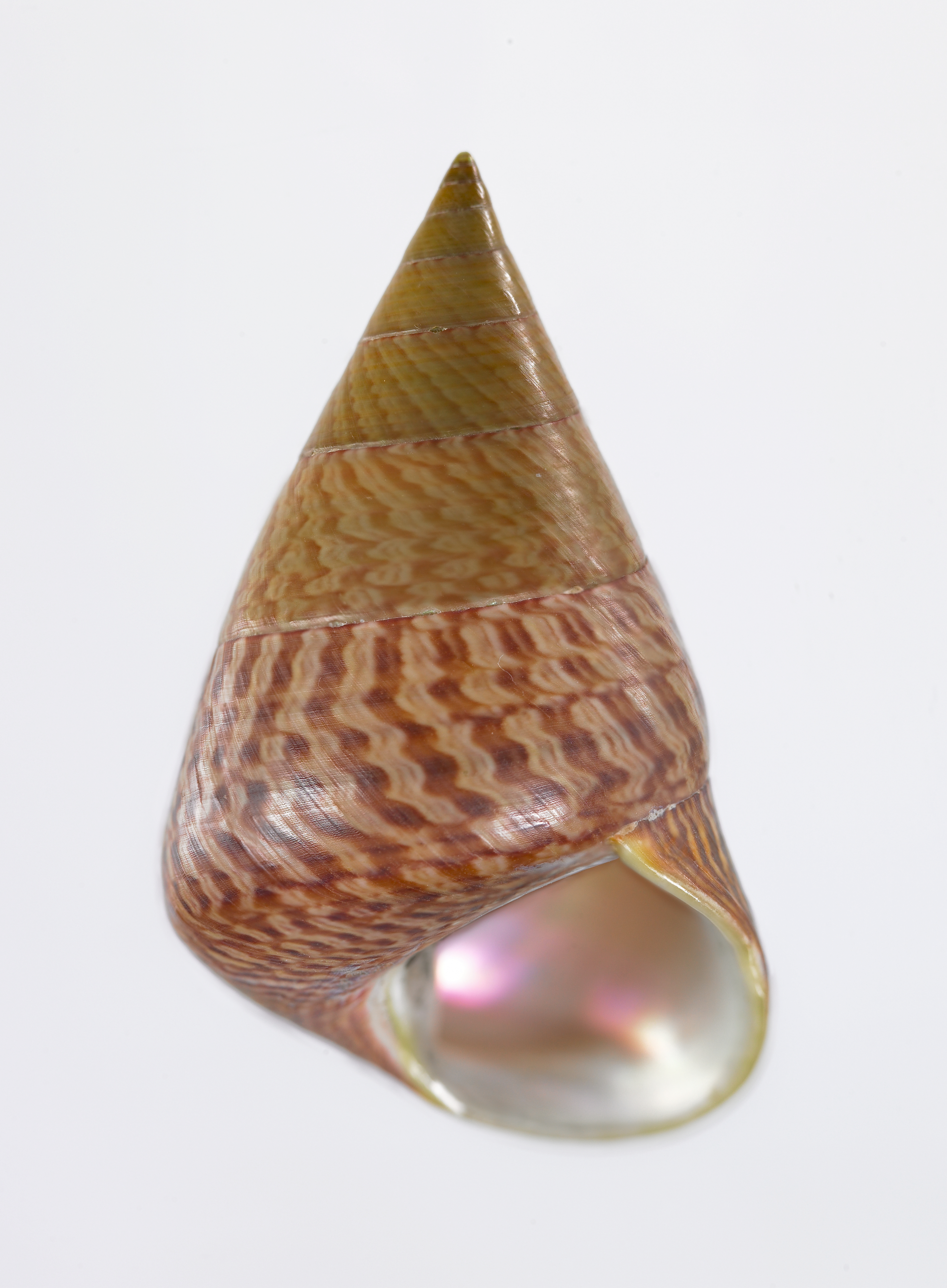
- Marine snail, Cantharidus opalus (Martyn, 1784)

Scientific classification
- Kingdom: Animalia
- Phylum: Mollusca
- Class: Gastropoda
- Subclass: Vetigastropoda
- Order: Trochida
- Superfamily: Trochoidea
- Family: Trochidae
- Genus: Cantharidus
- Species: C. opalus

Binomial name
- Cantharidus opalus (Martyn, 1784)

Synonyms
- Cantharidus iris Montfort, 1810; Cantharidus opalus biangulatus Suter, 1908; Cantharidus opalus cannoni Powell, 1933; Cantharidus zealandicus A. Adams, 1851; Limax opalus Martyn, 1784; Trochus acuminatus Perry, G., 1811; Trochus iris Gmelin, 1791

= Cantharidus opalus =

Species of gastropod

Cantharidus opalus, common name the opal top shell or in the Māori language matangongore, is a species of large sea snail, a marine gastropod mollusc in the family Trochidae, the top snails.

== Description ==
The length of the shell varies between 23 mm and 45 mm. The large, imperforate shell has an elevated conical shape. It is angular at the periphery, solid, but not very thick. Its spiral sculpture, not conspicuous, subobsolete. It is obsoletely distantly spirally grooved. These number about 7 on the penultimate whorl, mostly indistinct, crossed by more or less distinct oblique growth lines . The base of the shell contains about 5 spiral separated narrow ridges, often inconspicuous. The colour is whitish, tinged with blue on the body whorl and yellowish or pinkish on the spire, all over closely longitudinally marked with longitudinal zigzag markings of purple. These markings are often interrupted into spiral series of articulations. The epidermis is thin, shining, and easily rubbed off.

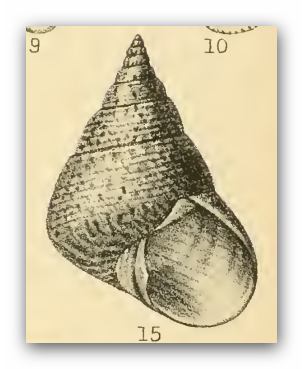
Drawing of a shell of Cantharidus opalus

The spire is elevated conic. Its sides are straight or slightly concave, more or less eroded, and showing the iridescent green nacre at the tip. The protoconch is conical, small, acute, and consists of 2½ convex smooth and pinkish-brown whorls. The shell contains 8 to 10 whorls. The first very slowly, then rapidly increase. The whorls are straight or slightly convex. The body whorl is distinctly angled at the periphery. The base of the shell is flatly convex. The sutures are well impressed, sometimes subcanaliculate on the lower whorls. The oblique aperture is ovate-rhoniboidal. It is lined with iridescent green nacre with red reflections. The outer lip is thin, and slightly sulcate within. There is often a broad opaque white callosity following a greenish edge inside. The columella is subvertical, generally straight in the middle or slightly projecting. The inner lip spreads as a broad white callus a little beyond the columella and over the parietal wall.

== Distribution ==
This marine species is endemic to New Zealand, where it is found subtidally in kelp beds down to at least 15m, on semi-exposed to exposed coasts.
