= Margarella tropidophoroides =

Scientific classification
- Kingdom: Animalia
- Phylum: Mollusca
- Class: Gastropoda
- Subclass: Vetigastropoda
- Order: Trochida
- Superfamily: Trochoidea
- Family: Calliostomatidae
- Genus: Margarella
- Species: M. tropidophoroides

Binomial name
- Margarella tropidophoroides (Strebel, 1908)

Synonyms
- Photinula (Promargarita) tropidophoroides Strebel, 1908

Species of gastropod

Margarella tropidophoroides is a species of sea snail, a marine gastropod mollusk in the family Calliostomatidae.

== Description ==
The shell grows to a height of 19 mm.

== Distribution ==
This marine species occurs off South Georgia Islands at depths between 12 m and 55 m.
