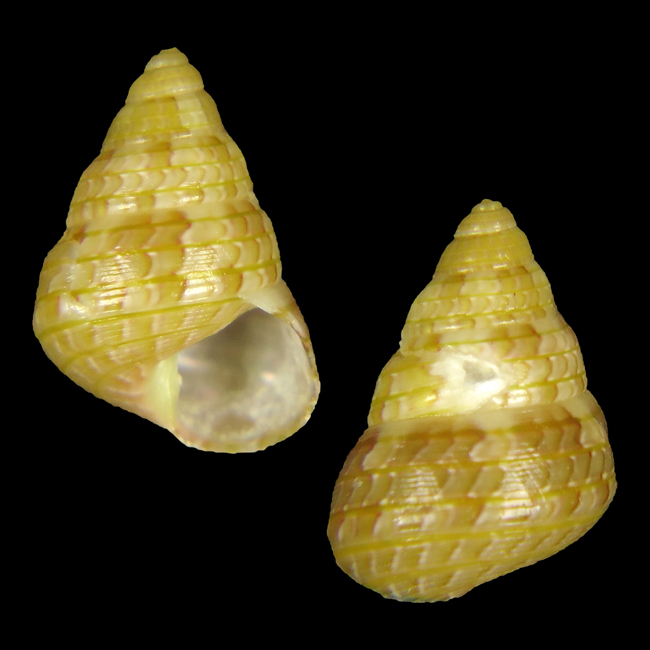

Scientific classification
- Kingdom: Animalia
- Phylum: Mollusca
- Class: Gastropoda
- Subclass: Vetigastropoda
- Order: Trochida
- Superfamily: Trochoidea
- Family: Trochidae
- Genus: Cantharidus
- Species: C. sendersi

Binomial name
- Cantharidus sendersi Poppe, Tagaro & Dekker, 2006

= Cantharidus sendersi =

Species of gastropod

Cantharidus sendersi is a species of sea snail, a marine gastropod mollusk in the family Trochidae, the top snails.

== Description ==
The length of the shell varies between 3 mm and 5.1 mm.

== Distribution ==
This species occurs in the Pacific Ocean off the Philippines and French Polynesia.
