= Margarella crebrilirulata =

Scientific classification
- Kingdom: Animalia
- Phylum: Mollusca
- Class: Gastropoda
- Subclass: Vetigastropoda
- Order: Trochida
- Superfamily: Trochoidea
- Family: Calliostomatidae
- Genus: Margarella
- Species: M. crebrilirulata

Binomial name
- Margarella crebrilirulata (E.A. Smith, 1907)

Species of gastropod

Margarella crebrilirulata is a species of sea snail, a marine gastropod mollusk in the family Calliostomatidae.

== Description ==
The height of the shell attains 5 mm.

== Distribution ==
This species can be found in the Ross Sea, Antarctica.
