= Photinula lahillei =

Scientific classification
- Kingdom: Animalia
- Phylum: Mollusca
- Class: Gastropoda
- Subclass: Vetigastropoda
- Order: Trochida
- Family: Calliostomatidae
- Subfamily: Calliostomatinae
- Genus: Photinula
- Species: P. lahillei

Binomial name
- Photinula lahillei Ihering, 1902

Species of gastropod

Photinula lahillei is a species of sea snail, a marine gastropod mollusk in the family Calliostomatidae.
