= Margarella subantarctica =

Scientific classification
- Kingdom: Animalia
- Phylum: Mollusca
- Class: Gastropoda
- Subclass: Vetigastropoda
- Order: Trochida
- Superfamily: Trochoidea
- Family: Calliostomatidae
- Genus: Margarella
- Species: M. subantarctica

Binomial name
- Margarella subantarctica (Strebel, 1908)

Synonyms
- Margarita subantarctica Strebel, 1908

Species of gastropod

Margarella subantarctica is a species of sea snail, a marine gastropod mollusk in the family Calliostomatidae.

== Description ==
The height of the shell attains 1.5 mm.

== Distribution ==
This marine species occurs off South Georgia Islands.
