= Calliostoma picturatum =

- Drawing of a shell of Calliostoma picturatum

Scientific classification
- Kingdom: Animalia
- Phylum: Mollusca
- Class: Gastropoda
- Subclass: Vetigastropoda
- Order: Trochida
- Family: Calliostomatidae
- Genus: Calliostoma
- Species: C. picturatum

Binomial name
- Calliostoma picturatum (A. Adams, 1851)

Synonyms
- Cantharidus picturatum A. Adams, 1851; Zizyphinus picturatus A. Adams, 1851 (original description)

Species of gastropod

Calliostoma picturatum is a species of sea snail, a marine gastropod mollusk in the family Calliostomatidae.

== Description ==
The height of the shell attains 18 mm. The imperforate shell has a turreted-conical shape. It is green or violaceous, ornamented with undulating bands and zigzag lines. The whorls are plane The basal margin is crenulated. The spire is sculptured with transverse impressed lines. The body whorl is angulated. The base of the shell is a little convex. The subquadrate aperture is white inside. The columella incurved, its base truncate.

== Distribution ==
This marine species occurs off the Philippines.
