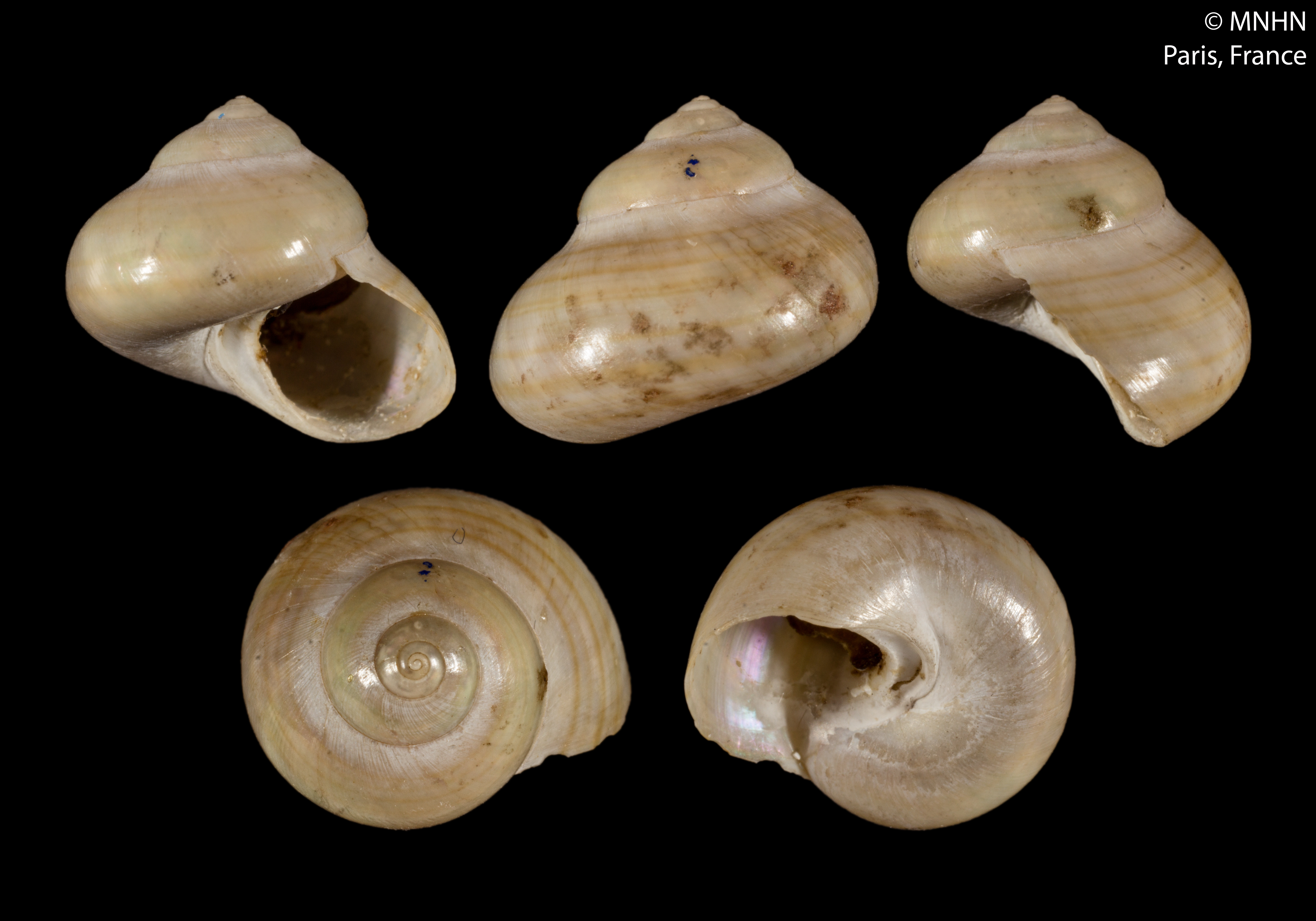
- Shell of Photinastoma taeniatum (syntype at MNHN, Paris)

Scientific classification
- Kingdom: Animalia
- Phylum: Mollusca
- Class: Gastropoda
- Subclass: Vetigastropoda
- Order: Trochida
- Superfamily: Trochoidea
- Family: Calliostomatidae
- Genus: Photinastoma
- Species: P. taeniatum

Binomial name
- Photinastoma taeniatum (Sowerby I, 1825)

Synonyms
- Margarita taeniatum (Sowerby I, 1825); Photinia hyadesi Rochebrune & Mabille, 1885; Photinula elata Strebel, 1905; Photinula gamma Rochebrune & Mabille, 1885; Photinula nivea Cooper & Preston, 1910; Photinula paradoxa Mabille, 1885; Photinula taeniatum (Sowerby I, 1825); Trochus bicolor Lesson, 1830; Trochus taeniatum (Sowerby I, 1825); Turbo taeniatus Sowerby I, 1825 (original combination)

= Photinastoma taeniatum =

Species of gastropod

Photinastoma taeniatum is a species of sea snail, a marine gastropod mollusk in the family Calliostomatidae.

== Description ==
The size of the shell varies between 10 mm and 28.5 mm.

== Distribution ==
This marine species occurs off the Falkland Islands and in the Strait of Magellan at depths from 1 m to 115 m.
