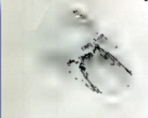
- Original image of a shell of Margarella steineni

Scientific classification
- Kingdom: Animalia
- Phylum: Mollusca
- Class: Gastropoda
- Subclass: Vetigastropoda
- Order: Trochida
- Superfamily: Trochoidea
- Family: Calliostomatidae
- Genus: Margarella
- Species: M. steineni

Binomial name
- Margarella steineni (Strebel, 1905)

Synonyms
- Margarita expansa auct. non Sowerby I, 1838; Photinula steineni Strebel, 1905

= Margarella steineni =

Species of gastropod

Margarella steineni is a species of sea snail, a marine gastropod mollusk in the family Calliostomatidae.

The species was named after Karl von den Steinen, who accompanied the German Antarctic expedition (1901–1903).

== Description ==
The height of the shell attains 12.5 mm.

== Distribution ==
This marine species occurs off the South Georgia Islands at depths between 0 m and 26 m.
