= Cantharidus interruptus =

Scientific classification
- Kingdom: Animalia
- Phylum: Mollusca
- Class: Gastropoda
- Subclass: Vetigastropoda
- Order: Trochida
- Family: Trochidae
- Genus: Cantharidus
- Species: C. interruptus

Binomial name
- Cantharidus interruptus (W. Wood, 1828)

Synonyms
- Calliostoma interruptum (W. Wood, 1828); Calliostoma plambralum Spry, 1961; Jujubinus interruptus (W. Wood, 1828); Trochus interruptus W. Wood, 1828

Species of mollusc

Calliostoma interruptus is a species of sea snail, a marine gastropod mollusk in the family Trochidae.

== Distribution ==
This species occurs in the Indian Ocean off Mozambique and Tanzania.
