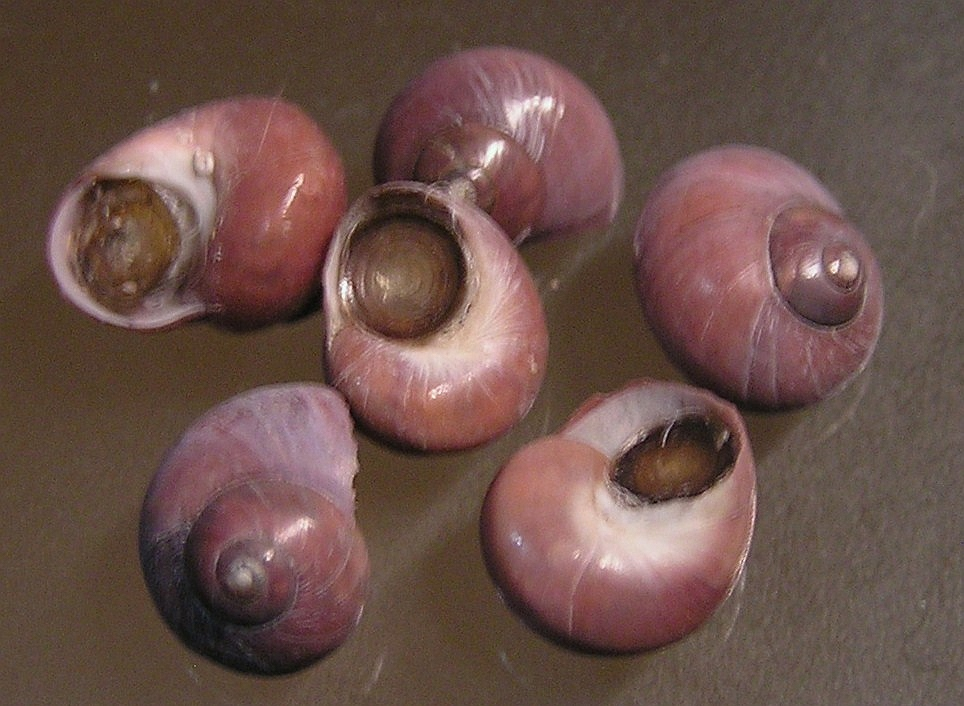
- Six live-collected shells of Margarella violacea with each operculum held in place with glue and cotton

Scientific classification
- Kingdom: Animalia
- Phylum: Mollusca
- Class: Gastropoda
- Subclass: Vetigastropoda
- Order: Trochida
- Family: Calliostomatidae
- Genus: Margarella
- Species: M. violacea

Binomial name
- Margarella violacea (King & Broderip, 1832)

Synonyms
- Margarita magellanica Hombron & Jacquinot, 1848; Margarita persica Gould, A.A., 1852; Margarites violacea (King & Broderip, 1832); Photinula almyris Rochebrune, A.-T. de & J. Mabille, 1885; Photinula depressa Preston, 1913; Photinula halmyris Rochebrune, A.-T. de & J. Mabille, 1891; Photinula solidula Cooper & Preston, 1910; Photinula violacea King & Broderip, 1832 (original description); Trochus violacea (King & Broderip, 1832)

= Margarella violacea =

Species of gastropod

Margarella violacea is a species of small sea snail, a marine gastropod mollusk in the family Calliostomatidae, the top snails.

== Description ==
The animal is pale beige in color and has a pair of cephalic tentacles. The eyes are large and black. The shell is small and wider than it is high. The size of an adult shell varies between 7 mm and 13.5 mm, but can be up to 8.4 mm in height and 9.9 mm in diameter. The purplish-pink shell is imperforate, orbicular-conical, thin and smooth, and is covered in fine pink or dark pink spiral lines. There are four swollen whorls. The suture is scarcely impressed. The rounded-quadrangular aperture is angular above, and subangular at the base of slightly thickened and arcuate columella. The umbilico-columellar tract is excavated.

== Distribution ==
This species occurs in the Atlantic Ocean on the coast of Argentina and the Falkland Islands, i.e. in the Magellanic Region.
