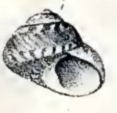
- Drawing of a shell of Cantharidus fulminatus

Scientific classification
- Kingdom: Animalia
- Phylum: Mollusca
- Class: Gastropoda
- Subclass: Vetigastropoda
- Order: Trochida
- Superfamily: Trochoidea
- Family: Trochidae
- Genus: Cantharidus
- Species: C. fulminatus

Binomial name
- Cantharidus fulminatus (Hutton, 1873)

Synonyms
- Chrysostoma fulminata Hutton, 1873; Gibbula fulminata Hutton, 1873; Margarella fulminata Hutton, 1873

= Cantharidus fulminatus =

Species of gastropod

Cantharidus fulminatus is a species of marine gastropod mollusc in the family Trochidae, the top shells.

== Description ==
The small, globose-conoidal shell measures 7½ mm. It is narrowly perforate, shining, solid, smooth, except for a few stride around the white umbilicus. Its color is pink, orange, purplish or olive-brown, generally with a series of white blotches alternating with self-colored darker ones below the sutures, a girdle of white blotches around the periphery and often around the umbilicus. The intervening spaces are irregularly strigate with darker zigzag streaks or unicolored. The apex is rosy. The spire is short and contains about 5 convex whorls. The rounded-quadrate aperture is iridescent within. The lip is white-margined. The arcuate columella is a trifle straightened in the middle.

== Distribution ==
It is a shallow water gastropod, found only off the Chatham Islands of New Zealand.
