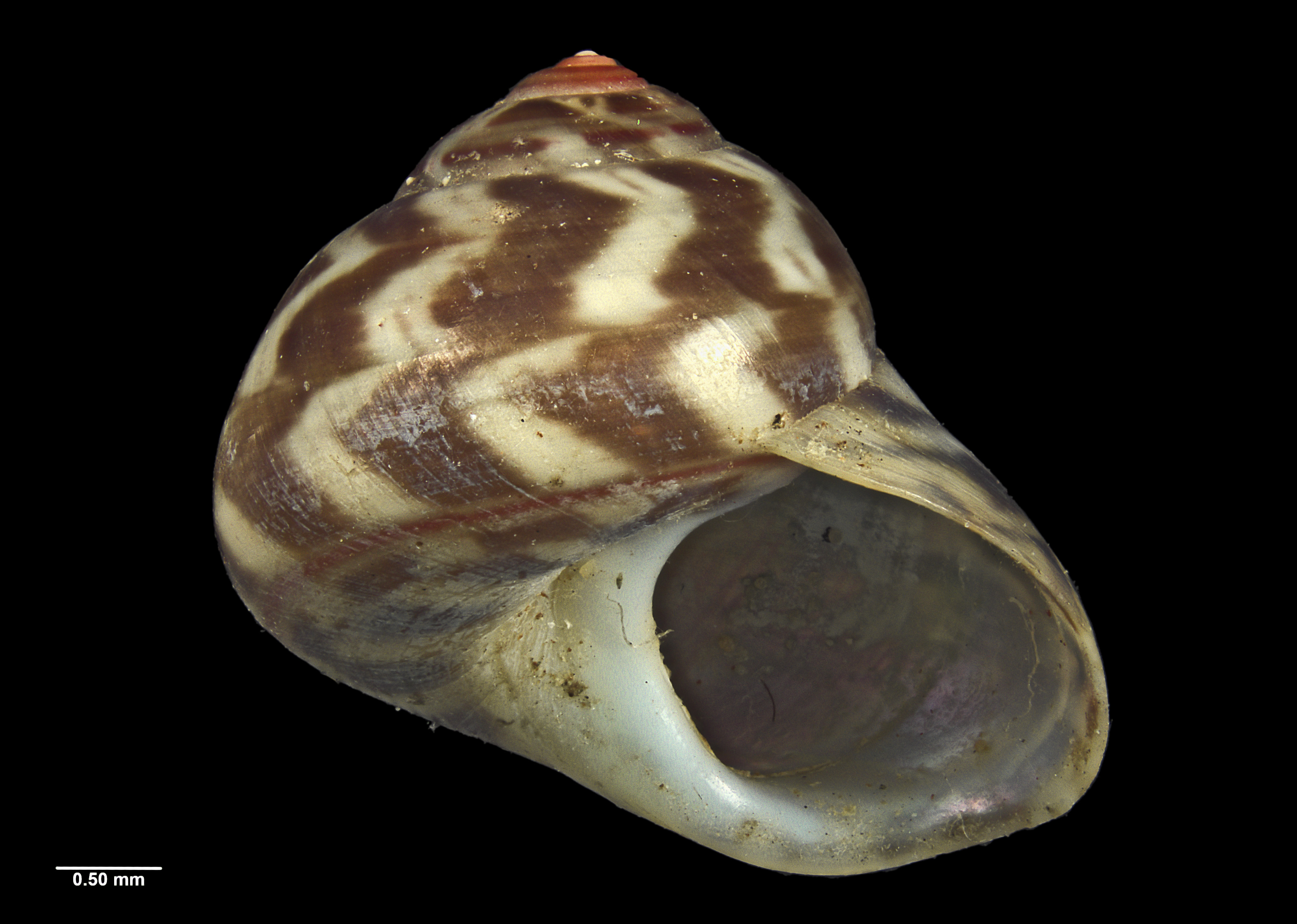

Scientific classification
- Kingdom: Animalia
- Phylum: Mollusca
- Class: Gastropoda
- Subclass: Vetigastropoda
- Order: Trochida
- Superfamily: Trochoidea
- Family: Trochidae
- Genus: Cantharidus
- Species: C. turneri

Binomial name
- Cantharidus turneri (Powell, 1939)

Synonyms
- Margarella turneri Powell, 1939

= Cantharidus turneri =

Species of gastropod

Cantharidus turneri is a species of sea snail, a marine gastropod mollusk in the family Trochidae, the top snails. The species was originally described as Margarella turneri by Arthur William Baden Powell in 1939, but later research has placed it in the genus Cantharidus within the subfamily Cantharidinae in the family Trochidae.

== Description ==
The shell grows to a length of 9 mm, its diameter is 8 mm.

== Distribution ==
This top snail is endemic to the southern shores of New Zealand. C. turneri has been found around Stewart Island (including Ulva Island in Paterson Inlet) and has also been recorded on the Snares, Auckland, and Campbell Islands further south. It inhabits the low intertidal to shallow subtidal zone, where it lives on seaweed-covered rocks near low tide level. The holotype was collected under such conditions at Stewart Island.
