= Margarella wacei =

Scientific classification
- Kingdom: Animalia
- Phylum: Mollusca
- Class: Gastropoda
- Subclass: Vetigastropoda
- Order: Trochida
- Superfamily: Trochoidea
- Family: Calliostomatidae
- Genus: Margarella
- Species: M. wacei

Binomial name
- Margarella wacei (Melvill & Standen, 1918)

Synonyms
- Margarites wacei (Melvill & Standen, 1918); Photinula wacei Melvill & Standen, 1918 (original combination)

Species of gastropod

Margarella wacei is a species of sea snail, a marine gastropod mollusk in the family Calliostomatidae.

== Description ==
The height of the shell attains 8 mm.

== Distribution ==
This marine species occurs in the Atlantic Ocean off the Falkland Islands.
