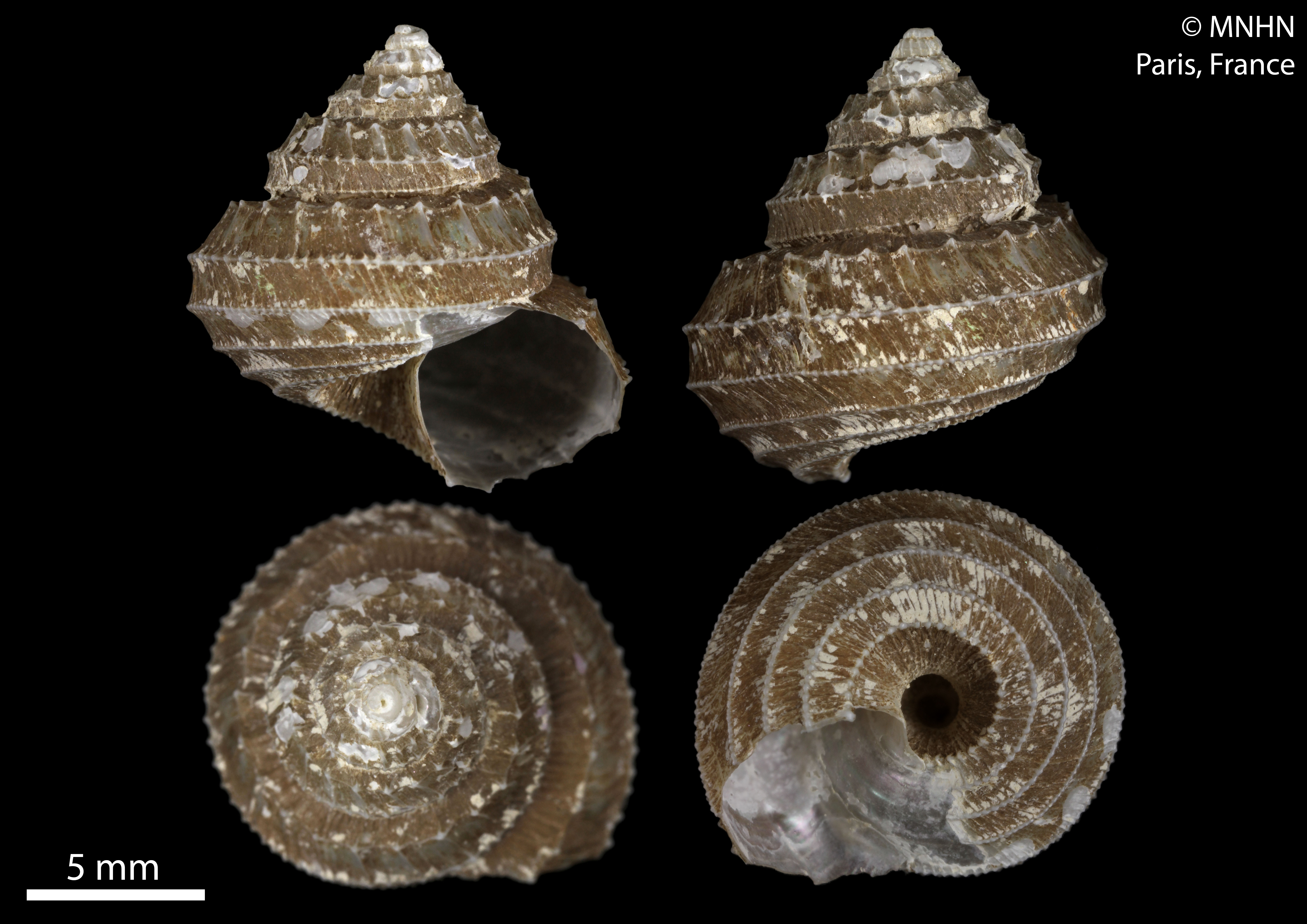
- Shell of Calliotropis infundibulum (specimen at MNHN, Paris)

Scientific classification
- Kingdom: Animalia
- Phylum: Mollusca
- Class: Gastropoda
- Subclass: Vetigastropoda
- Family: Calliotropidae
- Genus: Calliotropis
- Species: C. infundibulum

Binomial name
- Calliotropis infundibulum (Watson, 1879)

Synonyms
- Lischkeia infundibulum Watson, 1879; Margarita diomedeae A. E. Verrill, 1893; Margarita infundibulum; Margarita infundibulum var. diomedeae A.E. Verrill, 1893; Solariella diomedeae A. E. Verrill, 1893; Solariella infundibulum Watson, 1879; Trochus (Margarita) infundibulum Watson, 1879 (basionym)

= Calliotropis infundibulum =

Species of gastropod

Calliotropis infundibulum is a species of sea snail, a marine gastropod mollusk in the family Eucyclidae.

== Description ==
(Original description by Watson) The shell size varies between 6 mm and 18 mm. The shell has a conical shape with a tumid base. It is carinated and umbilicated. It is thin, translucent and pearly.

Sculpture: There are two spirals, on the upper whorls, on the body whorl 7–8,. These are pretty strong, but fine beaded threads. The first lies remote below the suture, and is sparsely ornamented by longitudinally produced, high and pointed, tubercles. It forms a shoulder on the whorl. The second projects strongly and sharply at the periphery and forms the carina. It and those below are delicately fretted with close-set small beads. The third, which meets the outer lip, lies within the contraction of the base. The last two are closer than the rest, which, however, are sometimes brought closer by the additional thread which appears among them. The oe which defines the umbilicus is more sharply beaded than the rest.

Longitudinals: Below the suture and near the umbilicus the surface is sharply but delicately puckered, and these puckerings, strong in the early whorls, are in the later faintly continued across the whorls as lines of growth.

The colour of the shell is yellowish white, with a brilliant nacreous sheen shining through the thin superficial calcareous layer, which becomes more opaque in drying.

The high spire is scalar. The apex is minute, flattened, with the minute bulbous embryonic 1¼ whorl projecting on one side. The 8 whorls increase rapidly in size. They are rounded, but angulated by the projection of the spirals, very tumid on the base. The suture is linear, but strongly defined by the contraction of the suprajacent whorl and the flat shoulder of the one below. The round aperture is very slightly oblique, but on the pillar flattened, and at the point of it angulated slightly. It is nacreous within. Across the body there is no pad, but the shell is eroded, which looks like a thin callus.

The outer lip is thin, not descending. The columellar lip is slightly patulous, bending flatly over the umbilicus, and then advancing in a straight line to the point of the columella, where it is slightly angulated just where the beaded umbilical spiral ends.

The umbilicus is funnel-shaped, rather open, but a good deal contracted within, sharply scored with the lines of growth. The operculum is yellow, horny, very thin, consists of 7 to 8 whorls.

The animal has a uniform light colour. The foot is broad, and bluntly pointed behind. There are 5, probably 6, large appendages, between which the membrane above them is edged with many small ones.

== Distribution ==
This species is distributed in European waters along the Faroes, the North West Atlantic Ocean from Nova Scotia to North Carolina, and in the Gulf of Mexico; also off New Caledonia. .
