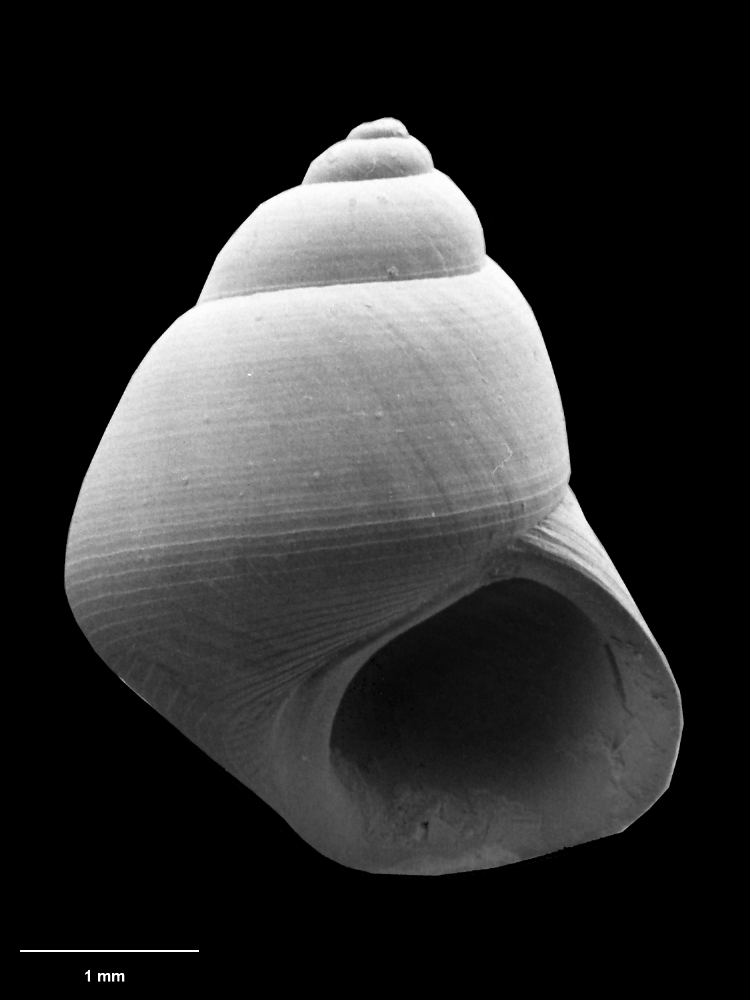
- Type specimen from Te Papa

Scientific classification
- Kingdom: Animalia
- Phylum: Mollusca
- Class: Gastropoda
- Subclass: Vetigastropoda
- Order: Trochida
- Superfamily: Trochoidea
- Family: Trochidae
- Genus: Cantharidus
- Species: C. festivus

Binomial name
- Cantharidus festivus (B. A. Marshall, 1998)

Synonyms
- Micrelenchus festivus Marshall, 1998

= Cantharidus festivus =

Species of gastropod

Cantharidus festivus is a species of sea snail, a marine gastropod mollusk in the family Trochidae, the top snails.

== Description ==
The length of the shell is usually 6.2 mm.

== Distribution ==
This marine species occurs off North Island, New Zealand in the Cape Reinga area, as well as in the reefs near the Three Kings Islands.
