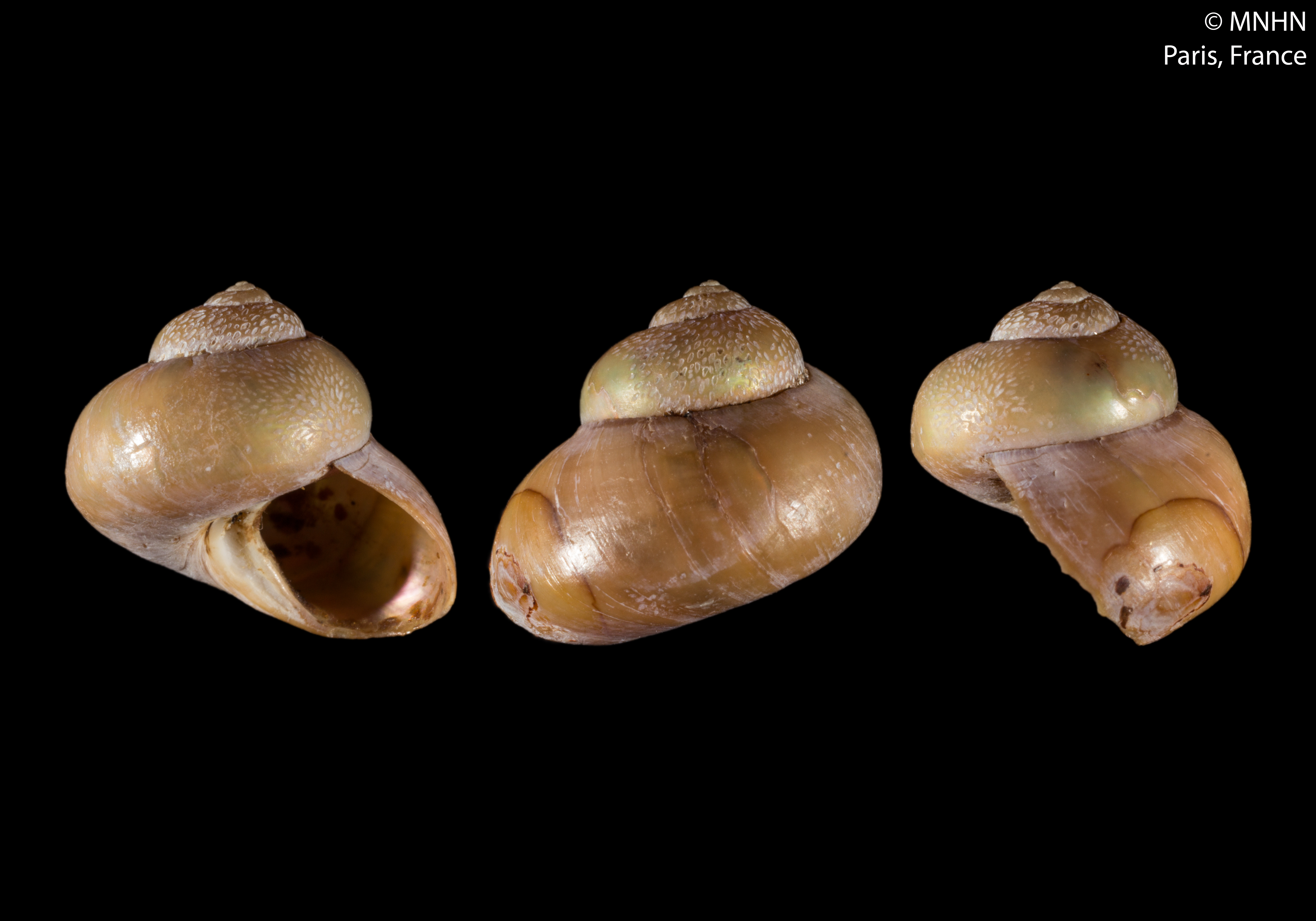
- Shell of Margarella pruinosa (syntype at MNHN, Paris)

Scientific classification
- Kingdom: Animalia
- Phylum: Mollusca
- Class: Gastropoda
- Subclass: Vetigastropoda
- Order: Trochida
- Superfamily: Trochoidea
- Family: Calliostomatidae
- Genus: Margarella
- Species: M. pruinosa

Binomial name
- Margarella pruinosa (Rochebrune & Mabille, 1885)

Synonyms
- Margarites pruinosa (Rochebrune & Mabille, 1885); Protinula pruinosa Rochebrune & Mabille, 1885 (original description)

= Margarella pruinosa =

Species of gastropod

Margarella pruinosa is a species of sea snail, a marine gastropod mollusk in the family Calliostomatidae.

== Description ==
The shell grows to a height of 14 mm. The imperforate shell has a subglobose-conical shape. It is a little thick and solid. Its color is violaceous. It is ornamented with irregular oblique striae and decussated with evanescent lines, only visible under a lens. The turbinate spire is prominent. The minute, shining apex is subacute. The 5-6 whorls are convex and regularly rapidly increasing. They are separated by impressed narrowly margined sutures. The large body whorl is above sloping, then rounded. It is subcarinated at the periphery and at the aperture scarcely descending. The oblique, shining aperture is lunate, transversely oblong, and obscurely lirate inside. The acute peristome is simple. Its, margins are subparallel, the outer subsinuous, the basal arcuate, the columellar incurved. The twisted columella is incurved, a little thick, callous, forming an obtuse angle at the base, and emitting a thick, white, shining, slightly dilated callous closing the umbilicus, and bipartite by a longitudinal sulcus.

== Distribution ==
This marine species occurs in the Magellanic Straits, Argentina.
