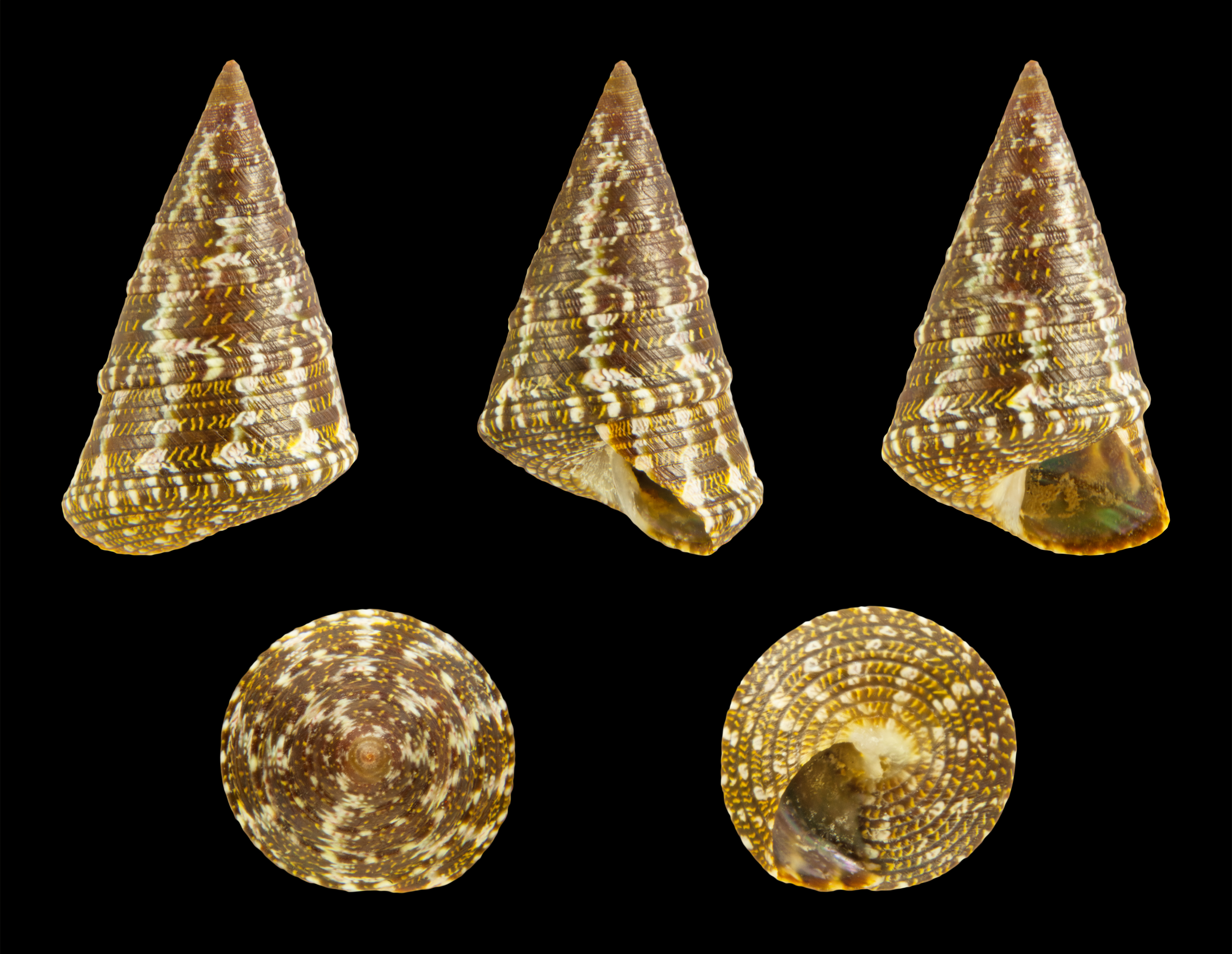

Scientific classification
- Kingdom: Animalia
- Phylum: Mollusca
- Class: Gastropoda
- Subclass: Vetigastropoda
- Order: Trochida
- Superfamily: Trochoidea
- Family: Trochidae
- Genus: Jujubinus
- Species: J. polychromus

Binomial name
- Jujubinus polychromus Thiele, 1930

Synonyms
- Calliostoma polychroma (A. Adams, 1853); Cantharidus polychroma (A. Adams, 1853); Cantharidus polychromus [sic] (misspelling); Cantharidus tristis Thiele, 1930; Jujubinus tristis (Thiele, 1930); Ziziphinus polychroma A. Adams, 1853 (original combination); Ziziphinus polychromus [sic] (misspelling)

= Jujubinus polychromus =

Species of mollusc

Jujubinus polychromus is a species of sea snail, a marine gastropod mollusk in the family Trochidae, the top snails.

== Distribution ==
This marine species is endemic to Southwest Australia
