= Margarella achilles =

Scientific classification
- Kingdom: Animalia
- Phylum: Mollusca
- Class: Gastropoda
- Subclass: Vetigastropoda
- Order: Trochida
- Superfamily: Trochoidea
- Family: Calliostomatidae
- Genus: Margarella
- Species: M. achilles

Binomial name
- Margarella achilles (Strebel, 1908)

Synonyms
- Photinula achilles Strebel, 1908 (basionym)

Species of gastropod

Margarella achilles is a species of sea snail, a marine gastropod mollusk in the family Calliostomatidae.

== Description ==
The shell grows to a height of 19 mm.

== Distribution ==
This subantarctic marine species is found off South Georgia at depths between 0 m and 53 m.
