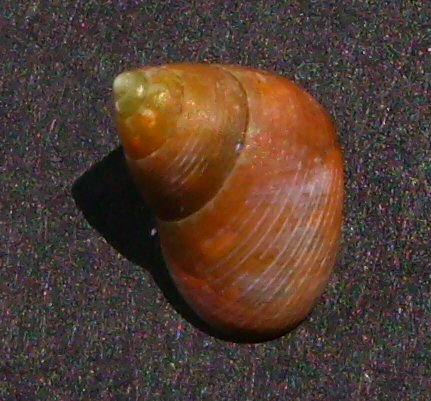
- A shell of Cantharidus dilatatus

Scientific classification
- Kingdom: Animalia
- Phylum: Mollusca
- Class: Gastropoda
- Subclass: Vetigastropoda
- Order: Trochida
- Superfamily: Trochoidea
- Family: Trochidae
- Genus: Cantharidus
- Species: C. dilatatus

Binomial name
- Cantharidus dilatatus (G.B. Sowerby II, 1870)

Synonyms
- Cantharidus simulatus Hutton; Chrysostoma simulata Hutton; Elenchus dilatatus Sowerby II, 1870; Gibbula simulata Hutton; Micrelenchus dilatus (G.B. Sowerby II, 1870)

= Cantharidus dilatatus =

Species of gastropod

Cantharidus dilatatus is a species of sea snail, a marine gastropod mollusk in the family Trochidae, the top snails.

== Description ==
The shell grows to a length of 8 mm, its diameter also 8 mm. The small, imperforate shell has a conical shape. It is spirally striated. Its sculpture consistis of numerous fine and inconspicuous spiral striae, more distinct and a little further apart on the base.

Its colour is cinereous, pink, or pinkish-brown, usually with white markings near the suture or tessellated with white. Sometimes a broad dark-brown band encircling the periphery of the whorls, and one on the centre of the base. White zigzag bands are sometimes adorning the last 2 or 3 whorls. The epidermis is thin, slightly shining, easily worn off.

The spire is conical, as high as the aperture and a little convex. The apex is acute. The protoconch is very small, consisting of 1½ smooth, slightly convex whorls. The six whorls are slightly convex. The body whorl is obtusely angled at the periphery, and considerably expanded. The base of the shell is flat. The sutures are linear, but little impressed. The aperture is subrotund, oblique, inside mostly highly bluish-reddish iridescent and finely lirate. The outer lip is strengthened by an inner white callosity. The concave columella is vertical. The inner lip is broadly expanded, covering the umbilicus, and spreading as a broad white callosity over the parietal wall.

== Distribution ==
This marine species is endemic to New Zealand and occurs off the North, South, Stewart and Chatham Islands.
