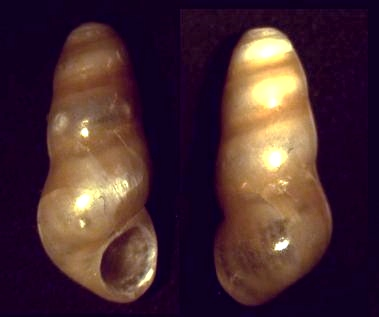
- Two views of a shell of Halistylus columna

Scientific classification
- Kingdom: Animalia
- Phylum: Mollusca
- Class: Gastropoda
- Subclass: Vetigastropoda
- Order: Trochida
- Superfamily: Trochoidea
- Family: Trochidae
- Genus: Halistylus
- Species: H. columna

Binomial name
- Halistylus columna (Dall, 1890)

Synonyms
- Cantharidus columna Dall, 1890

= Halistylus columna =

Species of gastropod

Halistylus columna is a species of small sea snail, a marine gastropod mollusk in the family Trochidae, the top snails.

== Description ==
The height of the shell attains 5.8 mm, its diameter 1.9 mm. The small, blunt-tipped, polished shell has a subcylindrical shape. it is yellow, brown, salmon-colored, bluish gray, or streaked or banded with these colors. The shell contains seven whorls. The apex is flattish. The small nucleus is not differentiated. The whorls, after the second, are nearly equal in diameter. The suture is much appressed. The whorl is somewhat constricted in front of it. The sculpture consists only of faint incremental lines. The base of the shell is rounded. The aperture is rounded ovate, slightly oblique. The outer lip is continuous with the columella, which is raised, arched in harmony with the lip, but not reflected. There is no umbilicus. The simple lip is hardly thickened. There is a little callus on the body and in the posterior angle between the lip and body;. The aperture is simple and very slightly pearly. The operculum is circular, externally shaggy, with many whorls.

The animal has long slender tentacles. The black eyes stand on separate rather long peduncles. The epipodial line is indicated by four or six short stout papillae. The foot is short and broad. The muzzle is rather large and long, a. little indented in the middle line. The median and admedian teethare simple, with narrow straight stems, and simple, wide, mushroom-like cusps. The uncini are numerous and filiform. The admedian teeth number four, the outer ones the larger. The stems and bases of the middle part of the radula are so small and thin as to be difficult to distinguish.

== Distribution ==
This species occurs in the Atlantic Ocean off Southern Brazil to Argentina at depths between 18 m and 108 m.
