= Calliotropis actinophora =

Scientific classification
- Kingdom: Animalia
- Phylum: Mollusca
- Class: Gastropoda
- Subclass: Vetigastropoda
- Family: Calliotropidae
- Genus: Calliotropis
- Species: C. actinophora

Binomial name
- Calliotropis actinophora (Dall, 1890)

Synonyms
- Margarita actinophora Dall, 1890 (original combination); Solariella actinophora Dall, 1880

Species of gastropod

Calliotropis actinophora is a species of sea snail, a marine gastropod mollusk in the family Eucyclidae.

== Description ==
The length of the shell measures 10 mm.

== Distribution ==
This marine species occurs in the Gulf of Mexico, in the Caribbean Sea, the Lesser Antilles, and in the Atlantic Ocean off Northern Brazil.
