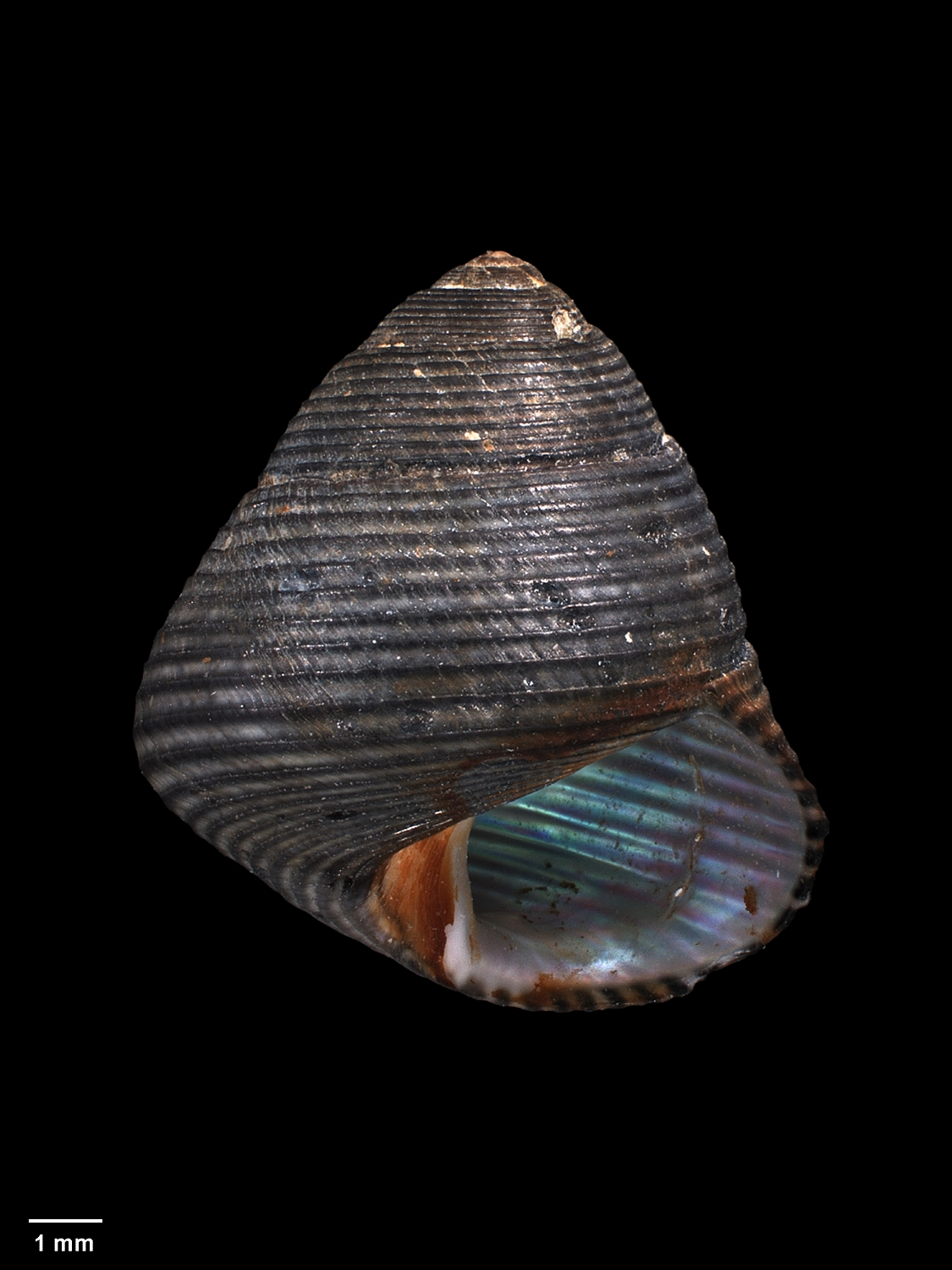

Scientific classification
- Kingdom: Animalia
- Phylum: Mollusca
- Class: Gastropoda
- Subclass: Vetigastropoda
- Order: Trochida
- Superfamily: Trochoidea
- Family: Trochidae
- Genus: Micrelenchus
- Species: M. huttonii

Binomial name
- Micrelenchus huttonii (E. A. Smith, 1876)

Synonyms
- Cantharidus huttonii (E.A. Smith, 1876); Gibbula plumbea Hutton, 1878; Micrelenchus (Micrelenchus) huttonii (E. A. Smith, 1876); Micrelenchus huttonii (E. A. Smith, 1876); Trochus (Cantharidus) huttonii E.A. Smith, 1876 (originanal combination)

= Micrelenchus huttonii =

Species of mollusc

Micrelenchus huttonii is a species of sea snail, a marine gastropod mollusk in the family Trochidae, the top snails.

== Description ==
The shell grows to a length of 14½ mm, its diameter 10½ mm. The covered perforate shell has a short-conical shape. It is bluish-black or purplishblack, the apex worn white. The 5 to 6 whorls are slightly convex. Their sculpture contains 7 to 8 spiral striae and incremental lines. The body whorl is obtusely angular at the periphery, rather convex beneath, slightly impressed in the region of the umbilicus. The lightly grooved aperture is subcircular-quadrate and iridescent within. The lip is within a trifle thickened. It is whitish and narrowly edged with black. The thickened columella is slightly arcuate and covers the perforation.

== Distribution ==
This marine species occurs off New Zealand.
