= Margarella macquariensis =

Scientific classification
- Kingdom: Animalia
- Phylum: Mollusca
- Class: Gastropoda
- Subclass: Vetigastropoda
- Order: Trochida
- Family: Calliostomatidae
- Genus: Margarella
- Species: M. macquariensis

Binomial name
- Margarella macquariensis Hedley, 1916

Synonyms
- Cantharidus macquariensis (Hedley, 1916)

Species of gastropod

Margarella macquariensis is a species of marine gastropod mollusc in the family Trochidae, the top shells.

== Description ==
The shell grows to a height of 11 mm; its diameter is also 11 mm.

== Distribution ==
This marine species has only been found off the Macquarie Islands.
