= Cantharidus puysegurensis =

Scientific classification
- Kingdom: Animalia
- Phylum: Mollusca
- Class: Gastropoda
- Subclass: Vetigastropoda
- Order: Trochida
- Family: Trochidae
- Genus: Cantharidus
- Species: C. puysegurensis

Binomial name
- Cantharidus puysegurensis Powell, 1939

Synonyms
- Cantharidus (Pseudomargarella) puysegurensis (Powell, 1939)· accepted, alternate representation; Cantharidus antipodum puysegurensis (Powell, 1939); Margarella antipoda puysegurensis Powell, 1939; Margarella puysegurensis Powell, 1939

Species of gastropod

Cantharidus antipoda puysegurensis is a subspecies of marine gastropod mollusc in the family Trochidae, the top shells.

== Distribution ==
This species is found at the South Island, New Zealand.
