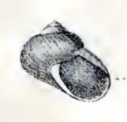
- Drawing of an apertural view of a shell of Margarella expansa

Scientific classification
- Kingdom: Animalia
- Phylum: Mollusca
- Class: Gastropoda
- Subclass: Vetigastropoda
- Order: Trochida
- Superfamily: Trochoidea
- Family: Calliostomatidae
- Genus: Margarella
- Species: M. expansa

Binomial name
- Margarella expansa (G.B. Sowerby I, 1838)

Synonyms
- Margarita expansa G.B. Sowerby I, 1838; Margarita (Photinula) expansa Von Martens & G. Pfeffer, 1885; Margarites expansa (Sowerby I, 1838); Photina expansa (Sowerby I, 1838); Photinula expansa (G.B. Sowerby I, 1838); Trochus expansa (Sowerby I, 1838); Trochus hillii Forbes, 1850; Trochus (Margarita) hillii Forbes, 1850; Trochus (Photinula) expansa E. A. Smith

= Margarella expansa =

Species of gastropod

Margarella expansa is a species of sea snail, a marine gastropod mollusk in the family Calliostomatidae.

== Description ==
The shell grows to a height of 14.1 mm. The thin, imperforate shell has a depressed-conoidal shape. It is shining, of a light olivaceous tint or somewhat tinged with pink. Its surface is smooth. The acute spire is conoidal. The sutures are slightly impressed. The shell contains about 42 rapidly widening whorls. The large body whorl is rounded at the periphery and a little impressed or margined below the suture. The large aperture is rounded and angular above, green and iridescent inside. The columellar margin is a little straightened. The umbilico-columellar tract is slightly excavated.

== Distribution ==
This marine species occurs off the Falkland Islands and in the Straits of Magellan at depths between 0 m and 150 m.
