= Monodont =

A monodont (< mono- 'single' + odont 'tooth') is an animal with one tooth.

== Sea snails ==
- Various sea snails of the family Trochidae
  - Genus Monodonta has multiple members
    - Monodonta canalifera, the canal monodont
  - Genus Phorcus
    - Phorcus punctulatus, the punctate monodont
    - Phorcus turbinatus, the turbinate monodont
  - Diloma aethiops, the scorched monodont
  - Clanculus undatus, the wavy Australian monodont

== Moth ==
- Monodonta (moth), a genus of moths
  - Monodonta passalis, the only species of the genus

== Whales ==
- Cetaceans of the family Monodontidae, the monodontids
  - Genus Monodon
    - The narwhal, Monodon monoceros
    - The beluga whale
