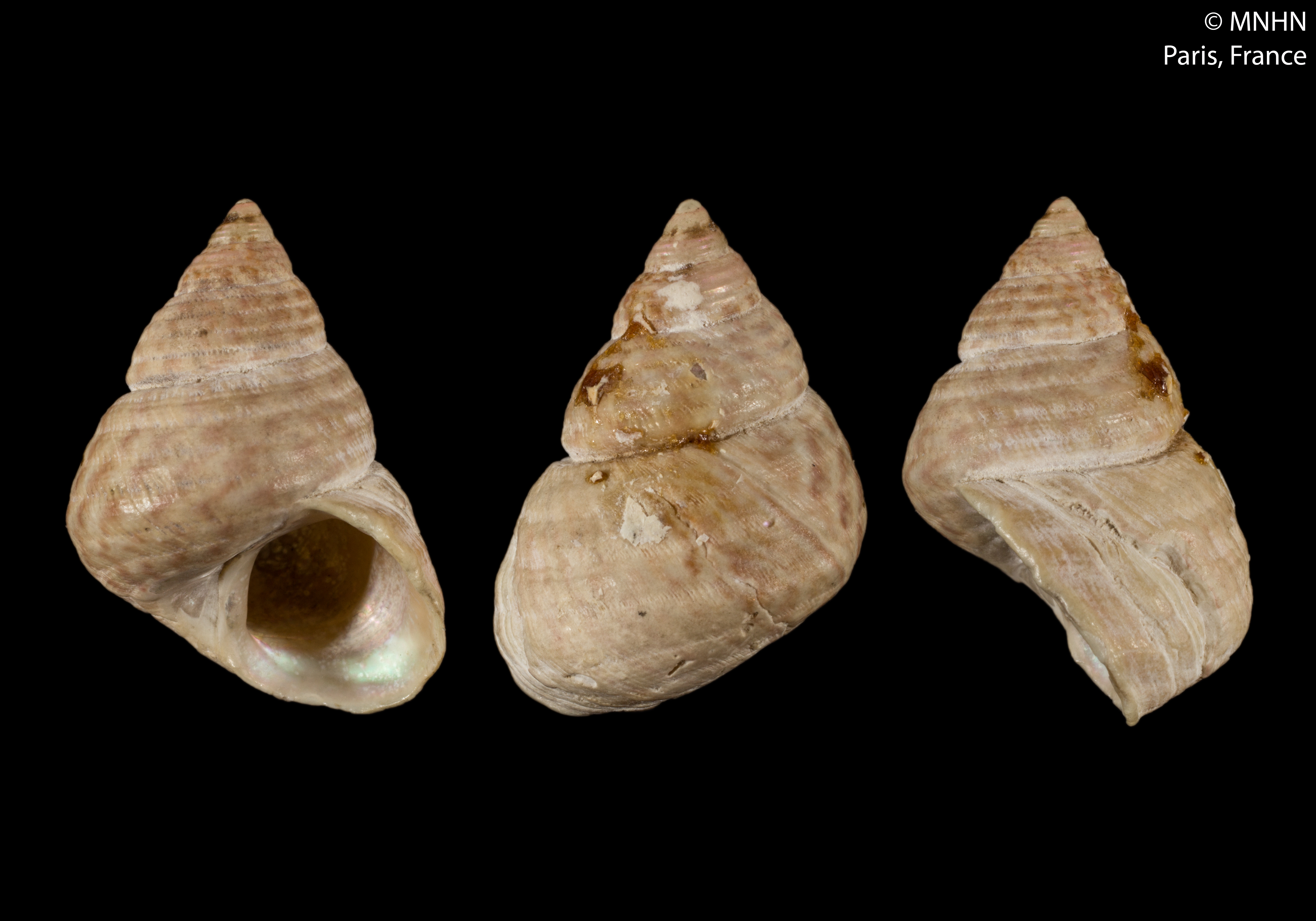
- Shell of Micrelenchus purpureus

Scientific classification
- Kingdom: Animalia
- Phylum: Mollusca
- Class: Gastropoda
- Subclass: Vetigastropoda
- Order: Trochida
- Superfamily: Trochoidea
- Family: Trochidae
- Genus: Micrelenchus; Finlay, 1926

Type species
- Trochus (Gibbium) sanguineus Gray, 1843

Synonyms
- Cantharidus (Mawhero) B. A. Marshall, 1998; Mawhero B. A. Marshall, 1998; Micrelenchus (Mawhero) B. A. Marshall, 1998· accepted, alternate representation; Micrelenchus (Micrelenchus) Finlay, 1926· accepted, alternate representation; Trochus (Gibbium) Gray, 1843 (invalid, junior homonym of Gibbium Scopoli, 1777)

= Micrelenchus =

Micrelenchus Temporal range: Miocene–Recent

Genus of gastropods

Micrelenchus is a genus of small sea snails that have shells with pearly interiors and an operculum. They are marine gastropod molluscs in the subfamily Cantharidinae of the family Trochidae, the top snails or top shells.

This genus is only known to occur in New Zealand.

== Species ==
Species and subspecies within the genus Micrelenchus include:

- Micrelenchus burchorum (B. A. Marshall, 1998)
- Micrelenchus huttonii (E. A. Smith, 1876)
- Micrelenchus purpureus (Gmelin, 1791)
- Micrelenchus sanguineus (Gray, 1843)
- Micrelenchus tenebrosus (A. Adams, 1853)
- Micrelenchus tesselatus (A. Adams, 1853)

Species brought into synonymy

- Micrelenchus artizona (A. Adams, 1853): synonym of Roseaplagis artizona (A. Adams, 1853)
- Micrelenchus caelatus (Hutton, 1884): synonym of Cantharidus caelatus Hutton, 1884
  - Micrelenchus caelatus archibenthicola Dell, 1956: synonym of Cantharidus caelatus mortenseni
  - Micrelenchus caelatus bakeri Fleming, 1948: synonym of Cantharidus artizona A. Adams, 1853 (Odhner, N.H.J., 1924)
  - Micrelenchus caelatus elongatus (Suter, 1897): synonym of Cantharidus caelatus elongatus (Suter, 1897)
  - Micrelenchus caelatus morioria Powell, 1933: synonym of Cantharidus caelatus mortenseni
  - Micrelenchus caelatus mortenseni (Odhner, 1924): synonym of Cantharidus mortenseni (Odhner, 1924)
- Micrelenchus capillaceus (Philippi, 1849): synonym of Cantharidus capillaceus (Philippi, 1849)
- Micrelenchus dilatatus (Sowerby, 1870): synonym of Cantharidus dilatatus (G.B. Sowerby II, 1870)
- Micrelenchus festivus Marshall, 1998: synonym of Cantharidus festivus (B. A. Marshall, 1998)
- Micrelenchus micans (Suter, 1897): synonym of Cantharidus artizona A. Adams, 1853
- Micrelenchus mortenseni (Odhner, 1924): synonym of Cantharidus mortenseni (Odhner, 1924) accepted as Roseaplagis mortenseni (Odhner, 1924)
- Micrelenchus oliveri (Iredale, 1915): synonym of Cantharidus sanguineus (Gray, 1843) synonym of Micrelenchus sanguineus (Gray, 1843)
- Micrelenchus parcipictus Powell, 1946: synonym of Cantharidus parcipictus (Powel, 1946)
- Micrelenchus rufozona (A. Adams, 1853): synonym of Cantharidus rufozona A. Adams, 1853: synonym of Roseaplagis rufozona (A. Adams, 1853)
