= Roseaplagis caelatus =

Scientific classification
- Kingdom: Animalia
- Phylum: Mollusca
- Class: Gastropoda
- Subclass: Vetigastropoda
- Order: Trochida
- Family: Trochidae
- Subfamily: Cantharidinae
- Genus: Roseaplagis
- Species: R. caelatus

Binomial name
- Roseaplagis caelatus (Hutton, 1884)

Synonyms
- Cantharidus caelatus (Hutton, 1884); Cantharidus sanguineus caelatus Hutton, 1884 (basionym); Micrelenchus caelatus (Hutton, 1884)

Species of gastropod

Roseaplagis caelatus is a species of small sea snail in the family Trochidae, the top shells.

== Description ==
It is smaller than Cantharidus sanguineus (height: 5.5 mm, diameter 4.5 mm) but it is more deeply ribbed and its grooves are wider. The imperforate shell is more deeply ribbed, and the ribs narrower. They number 5 to 7 on the penultimate whorl, 15 to 16 on the body whorl. Sometimes they are obsoletely granose through being crossed by growth lines. The columella shows a slight swelling in the middle.

== Distribution ==
This marine species is endemic to New Zealand and occurs off the Foveaux Straits; Port Pegasus, Stewart Island; Snares and Bounty Islands

== Subspecies ==
The former subspecies have been named:

- Micrelenchus caelatus archibenthicola Dell, 1956: synonym of Cantharidus caelatus mortenseni Powell, 1933; synonym of Roseaplagis mortenseni (Odhner, 1924)
- Micrelenchus caelatus bakeri Fleming, 1948: synonym of Roseaplagis artizona A. Adams, 1853 (Odhner, N.H.J., 1924)
- Micrelenchus caelatus elongatus (Suter, 1897): synonym of Cantharidus caelatus elongatus (Suter, 1897); synonym of Roseaplagis artizona A. Adams, 1853
- Micrelenchus caelatus morioria Powell, 1933: synonym of Cantharidus caelatus mortenseni Powell, 1933; synonym of Roseaplagis mortenseni (Odhner, 1924)
- Micrelenchus caelatus mortenseni (Odhner, 1924): synonym of Roseaplagis mortenseni (Odhner, 1924)
