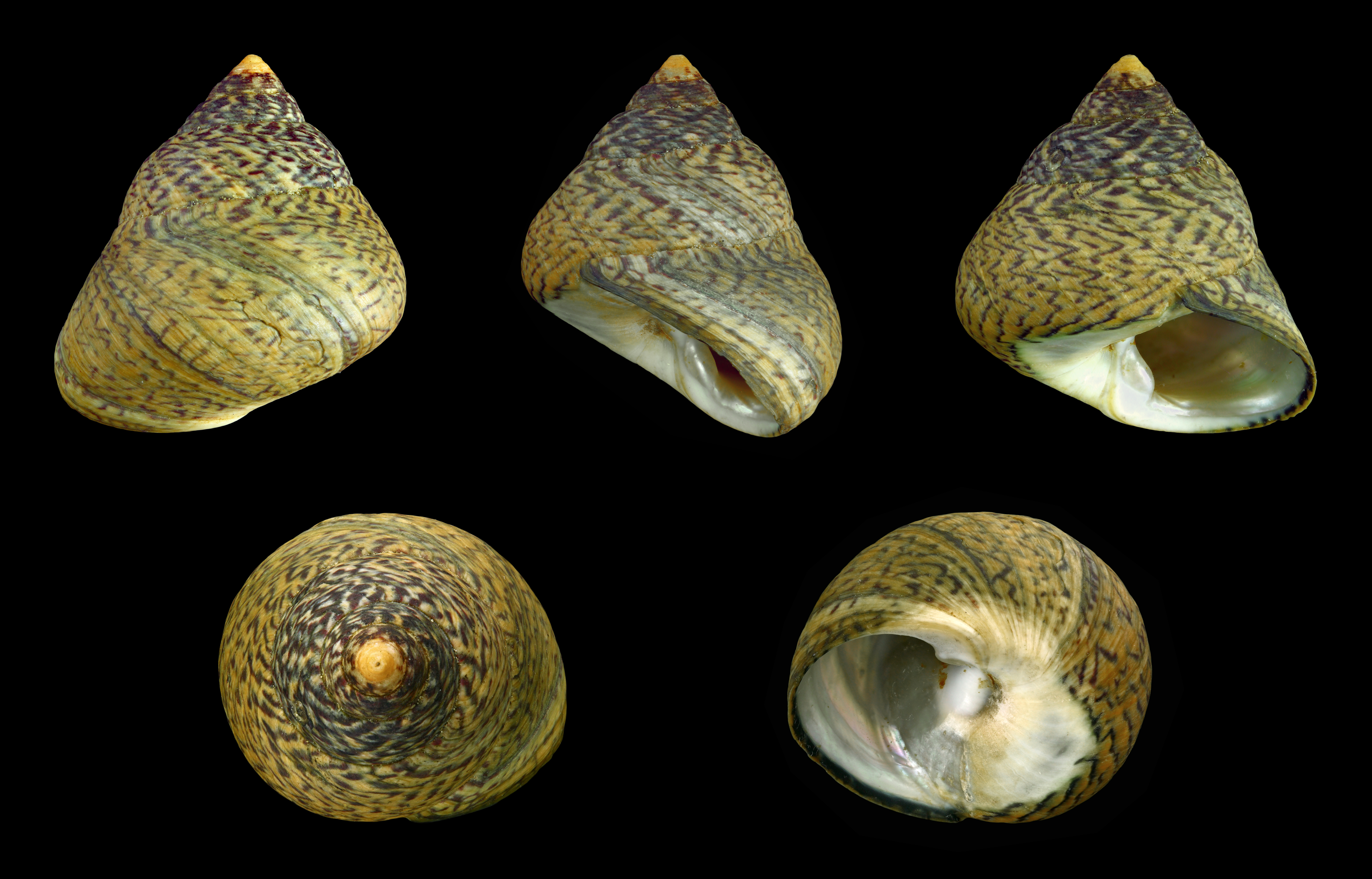
- A shell of Phorcus lineatus

Scientific classification
- Kingdom: Animalia
- Phylum: Mollusca
- Class: Gastropoda
- Subclass: Vetigastropoda
- Order: Trochida
- Family: Trochidae
- Subfamily: Cantharidinae
- Genus: Phorcus
- Species: P. lineatus

Binomial name
- Phorcus lineatus (da Costa, 1778)

Synonyms
- Monodonta crassa Montagu, 1803; Monodonta lineata da Costa, 1778; Monodonta lugubris Lamarck 1822; Osilinus lineatus (da Costa, 1778); Trochocochlea denudata Monterosato, 1888; Trochus crassus (Pulteney, 1799); Trochus lineatus da Costa, 1778 (original description)

= Phorcus lineatus =

Species of gastropod

Phorcus lineatus, common name the lined top shell, is a species of sea snail, a marine gastropod mollusk in the family Trochidae, the top snails. It is native to shores of the eastern North Atlantic Ocean.

== Description ==
The size of the shell varies between 10 mm and 35 mm. The very thick and solid imperforate shell is subperforate in the young. It has a globose-conic shape. It is dull grayish, densely marked all over with very numerous fine flexuous or zigzag braided purplish-black lines. The spire is conic. The 6 to 7 whorls are convex. The apex is usually eroded and orange-colored. The body whorl is flattened around the superior portion. The base of the shell is eroded in front of the aperture. The aperture is oblique. The columella is short, obtusely subdentate near the base, spreading at the insertion into a heavy callous, which covers the umbilicus.

This species is similar to Phorcus turbinatus in form, but usually has the outlines of the spire more convex. The columella projection or tooth is nearer the base than in the Phorcus turbinatus, and the diverse color patterns will serve to further distinguish the two species.

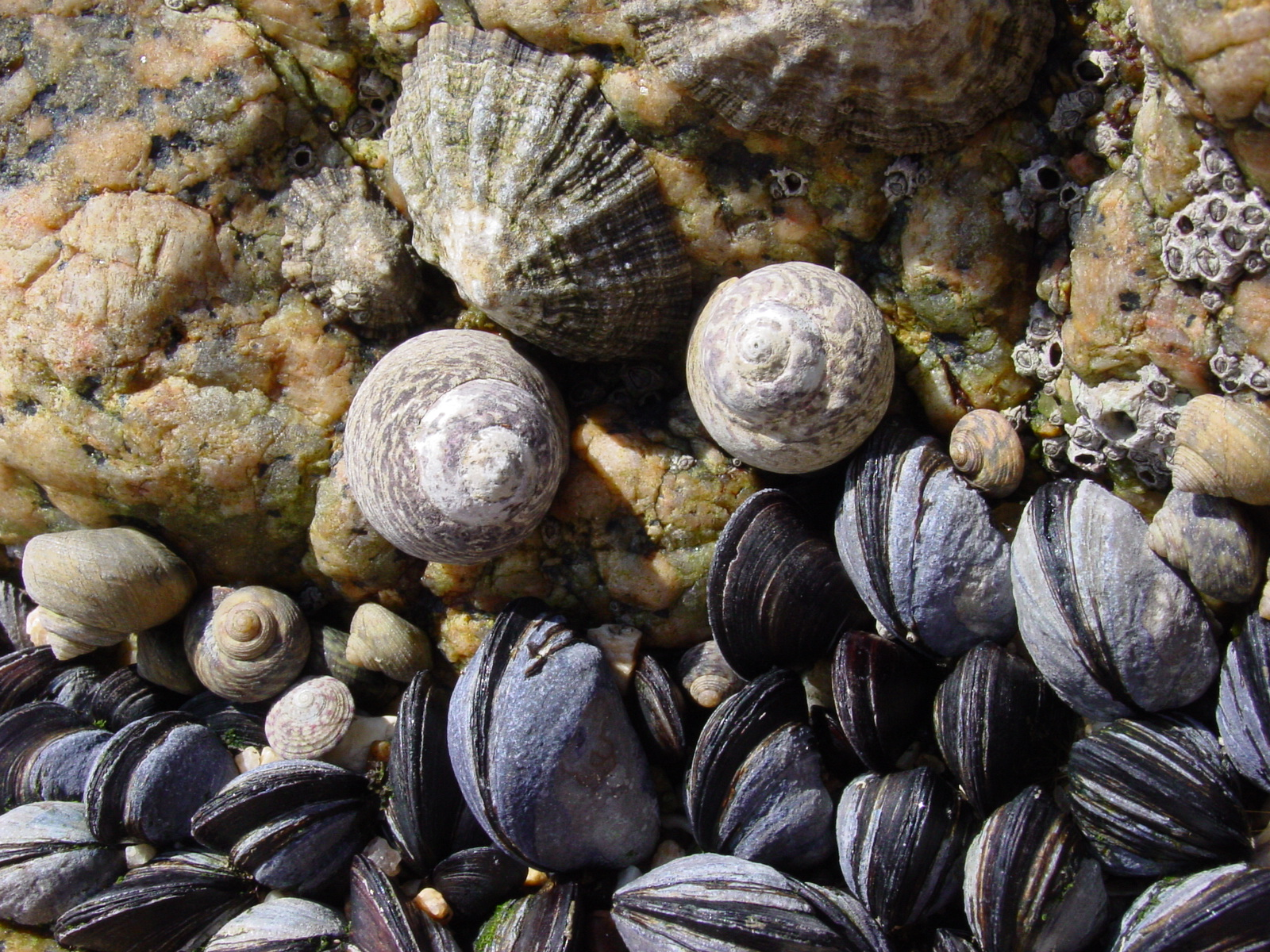
Two Phorcus lineatus in the centre of the photo

== Distribution ==
This species occurs in the following locations:

- European waters (ERMS scope)
- Portuguese Exclusive Economic Zone
- Spanish Exclusive Economic Zone
- United Kingdom Exclusive Economic Zone
- Wimereux
- Atlantic Ocean off Mauritania.
