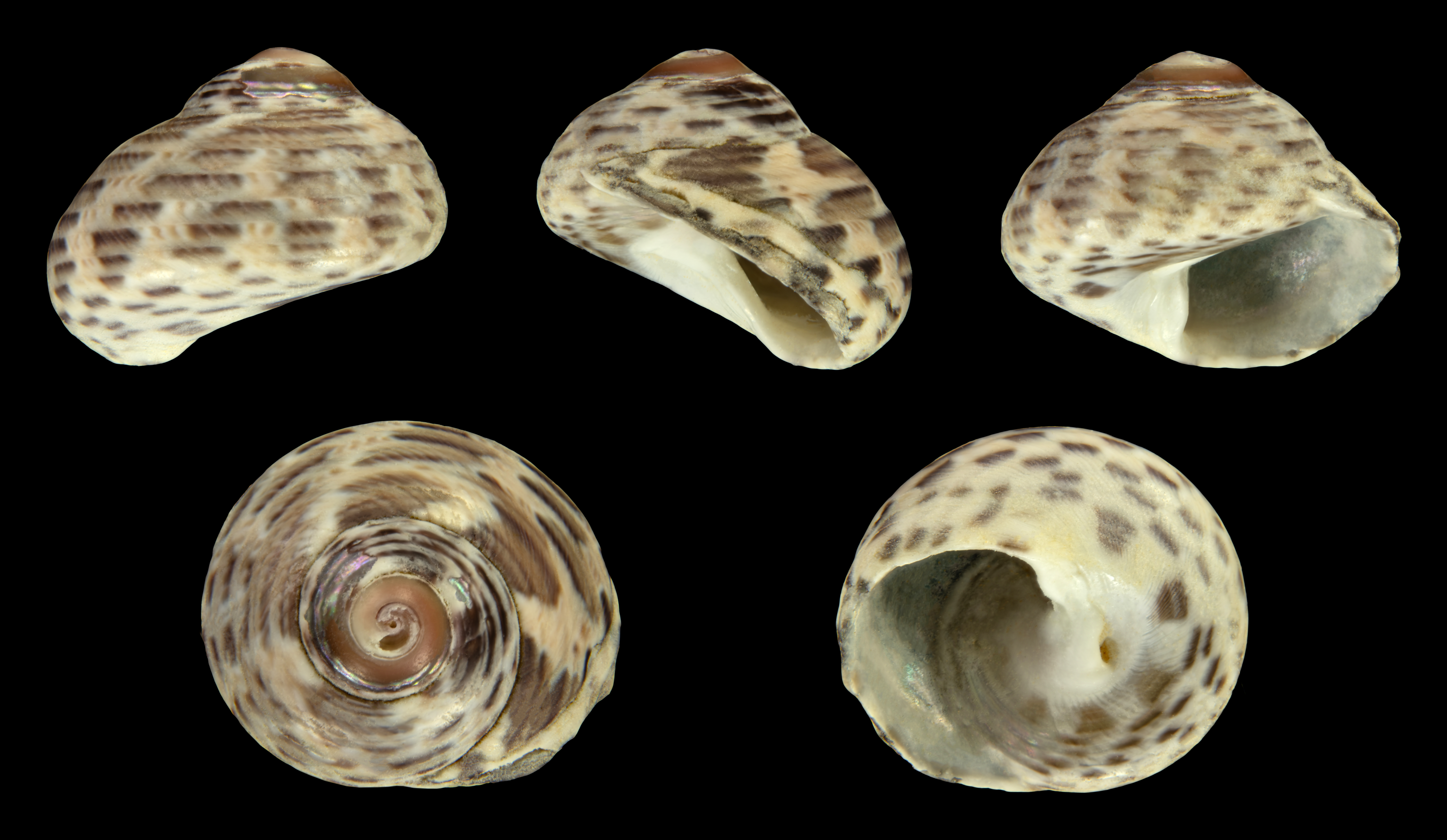
- Phorcus mutabilis

Scientific classification
- Kingdom: Animalia
- Phylum: Mollusca
- Class: Gastropoda
- Subclass: Vetigastropoda
- Order: Trochida
- Family: Trochidae
- Subfamily: Cantharidinae
- Genus: Phorcus
- Species: P. mutabilis

Binomial name
- Phorcus mutabilis (Philippi, 1846)

Synonyms
- Monodonta mutabilis (Philippi, 1846); Osilinus mutabilis (Philippi, 1846); Osilinus mutabilis divaricatoides Nordsieck, 1974; Osilinus mutabilis farolito Nordsieck, 1974; Trochus intermedius Monterosato, 1872; Trochus mongenii Monterosato, 1872; Trochus mutabilis Philippi, 1846 (original description)

= Phorcus mutabilis =

Species of gastropod

Phorcus mutabilis is a species of sea snail, a marine gastropod mollusk in the family Trochidae, the top snails.

== Description ==
The size of the shell varies between 12 mm and 24 mm. The solid, globose-conoid shell is umbilicate or subimperforate. It resembles a young Phorcus articulatus. Its color is usually grayish-yellow, yellow or flesh-tinted, more or less obviously marked with obliquely radiating lines or maculations of dull crimson, sometimes broken into tessellations, sometimes faintly, minutely articulated with reddish, appearing nearly unicolored. The short spire is conoid. The suture is impressed. The 5 to 6 whorls are slightly convex and spirally finely grooved. The body whorl is somewhat flattened around the upper part. The large aperture is very oblique. The lip forms half of a circle. It is not so much thickened nor beveled within as in Phorcus articulatus. The columella is more flattened than that of Phorcus articulatus. It is scarcely edged with pearl, the tooth or lobe less heavy, more acute than that species. The umbilical region is always more excavated than Phorcus articulatus. The umbilicus is open, or nearly closed by the callus at the insertion of the columella.

== Distribution ==
This species occurs in the Mediterranean Sea, the Adriatic Sea and in the Atlantic Ocean off Portugal.
