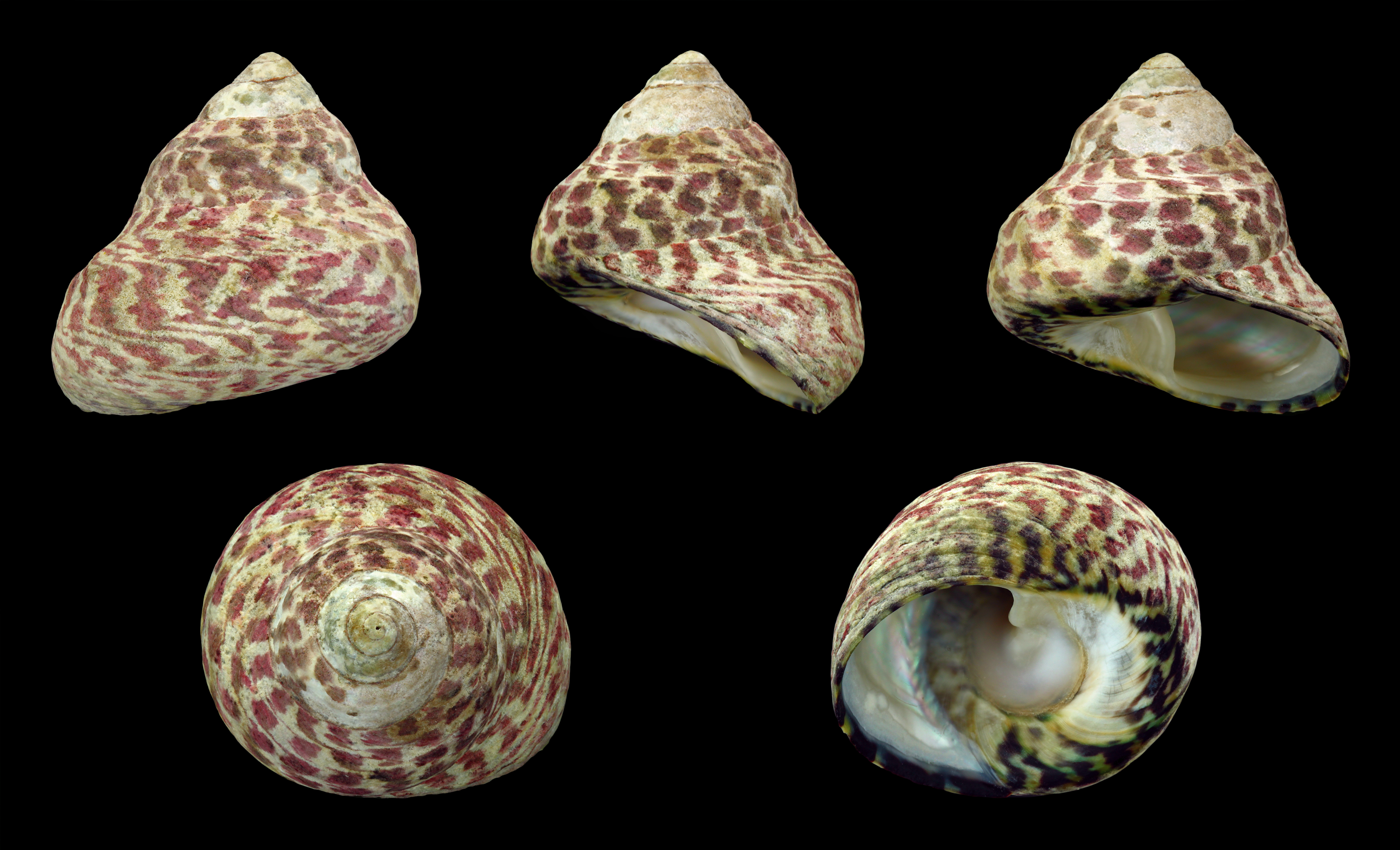
- A shell of Phorcus sauciatus

Scientific classification
- Kingdom: Animalia
- Phylum: Mollusca
- Class: Gastropoda
- Subclass: Vetigastropoda
- Order: Trochida
- Family: Trochidae
- Subfamily: Cantharidinae
- Genus: Phorcus
- Species: P. sauciatus

Binomial name
- Phorcus sauciatus (Koch, 1845)

Synonyms
- Monodonta edulis sauciata (Koch, 1845); Osilinus sauciatus (Koch, 1845); Trochocochlea sagittifera (Lamarck, 1822) sensu Pallary, 1920; Trochocochlea sagittifera var. angulosa Pallary, 1920; Trochocochlea sagittifera var. elevata Pallary, 1920; Trochocochlea sagittifera var. similigibbula Pallary, 1920; Trochus colubrinus Gould, 1849; Trochus sagittiferus Lamarck, 1822 (dubious synonym); Trochus sauciatus Koch, 1845 (original description); Trochus saulcyi d'Orbigny, 1840

= Phorcus sauciatus =

Species of gastropod

Phorcus sauciatus is a species of sea snail, a marine gastropod mollusk in the family Trochidae, the top snails. It is native to the Eastern North Atlantic Ocean off the coast of Macaronesia and the Iberian Peninsula.

== Description ==
The size of the shell varies between 11 mm and 27 mm. The imperforate, rather thin shell has a low conical shape. The coloration is excessively mutable, as well as the general form. Its ground color is greenish, especially on the body whorl, usually purplish on the spire, and either:

- spirally encircled by bands of dark green, black, or red oblong spots articulated with a lighter color
- or obscurely mottled with reddish, the ground color covered with fine oblique or zigzag lines.

The pattern is sometimes so obscurely mottled, spirally and obliquely streaked, that it appears nearly uniform olivaceous, especially on the body whorl. The conic spire is more or less elevated. The minute apex is acute, reddish, when not eroded. The sutures are well impressed. The shell contains six whorls that are spirally more or less obviously, finely, irregularly striate or lirate. The body whorl is rounded or subcarinated at the periphery. The base of the shell is somewhat convex, more or less impressed around the axis, sometimes eroded in front of the aperture. The large aperture is very oblique. The outer lip contains a black-spotted green edge, which is generally followed by a broad thin opaque-white band, within which it is nacreous and iridescent. The oblique columella is thin-edged, the edge convex in the middle. The columellar area is white and more or less eroded. The umbilical tract is covered by a thick pad of enamel.

== Distribution ==
This species occurs in the Eastern North Atlantic off the coast of the Iberian Peninsula (in mainland Portugal and Galicia) and in the Atlantic archipelagos of the Canary Islands, Madeira and eastern Azores.
