= Phorcus mariae =

Scientific classification
- Kingdom: Animalia
- Phylum: Mollusca
- Class: Gastropoda
- Subclass: Vetigastropoda
- Order: Trochida
- Family: Trochidae
- Subfamily: Cantharidinae
- Genus: Phorcus
- Species: P. mariae

Binomial name
- Phorcus mariae Templado & Rolán, 2012

Species of gastropod

Phorcus mariae is a species of sea snail, a marine gastropod mollusk in the family Trochidae, the top snails.

== Distribution ==
This species occurs in the Atlantic Ocean off the Cape Verde Islands.
