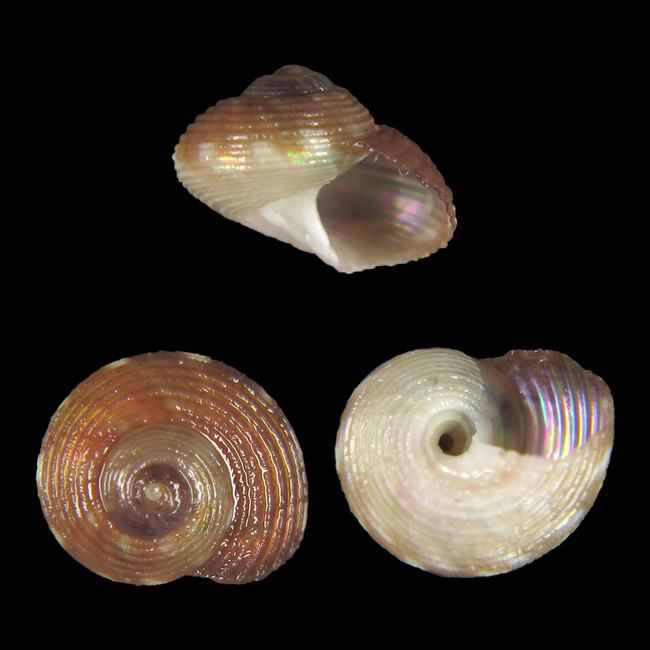

Scientific classification
- Kingdom: Animalia
- Phylum: Mollusca
- Class: Gastropoda
- Subclass: Vetigastropoda
- Order: Trochida
- Family: Trochidae
- Subfamily: Cantharidinae
- Genus: Pseudotalopia
- Species: P. rainesi

Binomial name
- Pseudotalopia rainesi Poppe, Tagaro & Goto, 2018

= Pseudotalopia rainesi =

Species of gastropod

Pseudotalopia rainesi is a species of sea snail, a marine gastropod mollusc in the family Trochidae.

== Original description ==
- Poppe G.T., Tagaro S.P. & Dekker H. (2006) The Seguenziidae, Chilodontidae, Trochidae, Calliostomatidae and Solariellidae of the Philippine Islands. Visaya Supplement 2: 1-228.
