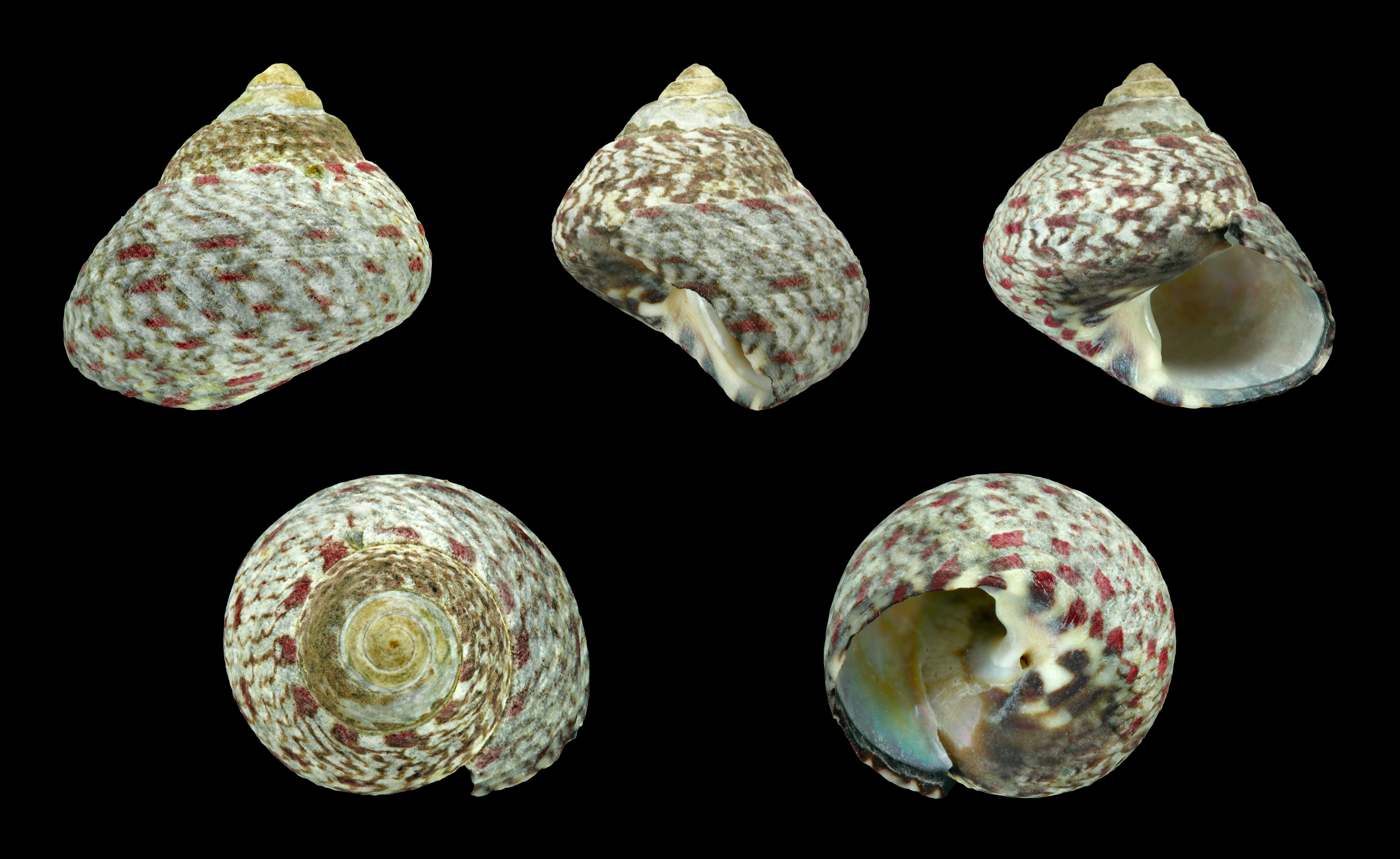
- A shell of Phorcus articulatus

Scientific classification
- Kingdom: Animalia
- Phylum: Mollusca
- Class: Gastropoda
- Subclass: Vetigastropoda
- Order: Trochida
- Family: Trochidae
- Subfamily: Cantharidinae
- Genus: Phorcus
- Species: P. articulatus

Binomial name
- Phorcus articulatus (Lamarck, 1822)

Synonyms
- Monodonta articulata Lamarck, 1822 (original combination); Monodonta draparnaudii Payraudeau, 1826; Monodonta ulvae Risso, 1826; Osilinus articulatus (Lamarck, 1822); Osilinus articulatus flammoides Nordsieck, 1974; Trochocochlea arenosa Monterosato, 1917; Trochocochlea articulata (Lamarck, 1822); Trochocochlea articulata var. constricta Monterosato, 1888; Trochocochlea articulata var. depauperata Monterosato, 1888; Trochocochlea articulata var. fulminea Monterosato, 1888; Trochocochlea articulata var. minor Monterosato, 1888; Trochocochlea articulata var. trivialis Monterosato, 1888; Trochocochlea articulata var. undata Monterosato, 1888; Trochocochlea blainvillei Pallary, 1902; Trochocochlea turbiformis (von Salis, 1793); Trochocochlea turbiformis var. minor Pallary, 1900; Trochocochlea turbiformis var. undata Pallary, 1938; Trochus (Monodonta) sitis Récluz, 1843; Trochus articulatus (Lamarck, 1822); Trochus articulatus var. lineolata Bucquoy, Dautzenberg & Dollfus, 1884; Trochus articulatus var. major Bucquoy, Dautzenberg & Dollfus, 1884; Trochus corcyrensis Stossich, 1865; Trochus turbiformis Salis Marschlins, 1793

= Phorcus articulatus =

Species of gastropod

Phorcus articulatus is a species of sea snail, a marine gastropod mollusk in the family Trochidae, the top snails.

== Description ==
The height of the shell varies between 15 mm and 28 mm, its diameter between 21 mm and 24 mm. The shell is imperforate in the adult, generally perforate when immature. It is heavy and thick and has an elongate-conical shape. Its color is cinereous greenish or whitish, spirally traversed by bands composed of alternating white and black purplish or red squarish spots. The intervals between the bands are longitudinally closely lineolate with blackish. The spire is elevated. The shell contains about 6 whorls. The upper ones are slightly convex, the last generally constricted and concave below the suture, then convex. The spiral impressed grooves or lines are like those of Phorcus turbinatus in the young, but become generally obsolete in adult specimens. The aperture has the same shape as in Phorcus turbinatus, but is smaller and less oblique.

== Distribution ==
This species occurs in the following locations:

- European waters (ERMS scope)
- Greek Exclusive Economic Zone
- Portuguese Exclusive Economic Zone
- Spanish Exclusive Economic Zone
