= Pseudotalopia taiwanensis =

Scientific classification
- Kingdom: Animalia
- Phylum: Mollusca
- Class: Gastropoda
- Subclass: Vetigastropoda
- Order: Trochida
- Family: Trochidae
- Subfamily: Cantharidinae
- Genus: Pseudotalopia
- Species: P. taiwanensis

Binomial name
- Pseudotalopia taiwanensis (Chen, 2006)

Synonyms
- Gibbula taiwanensis Chen, 2006 (original combination)

Species of gastropod

Pseudotalopia taiwanensis is a species of sea snail, a marine gastropod mollusk in the family Trochidae, the top snails.
