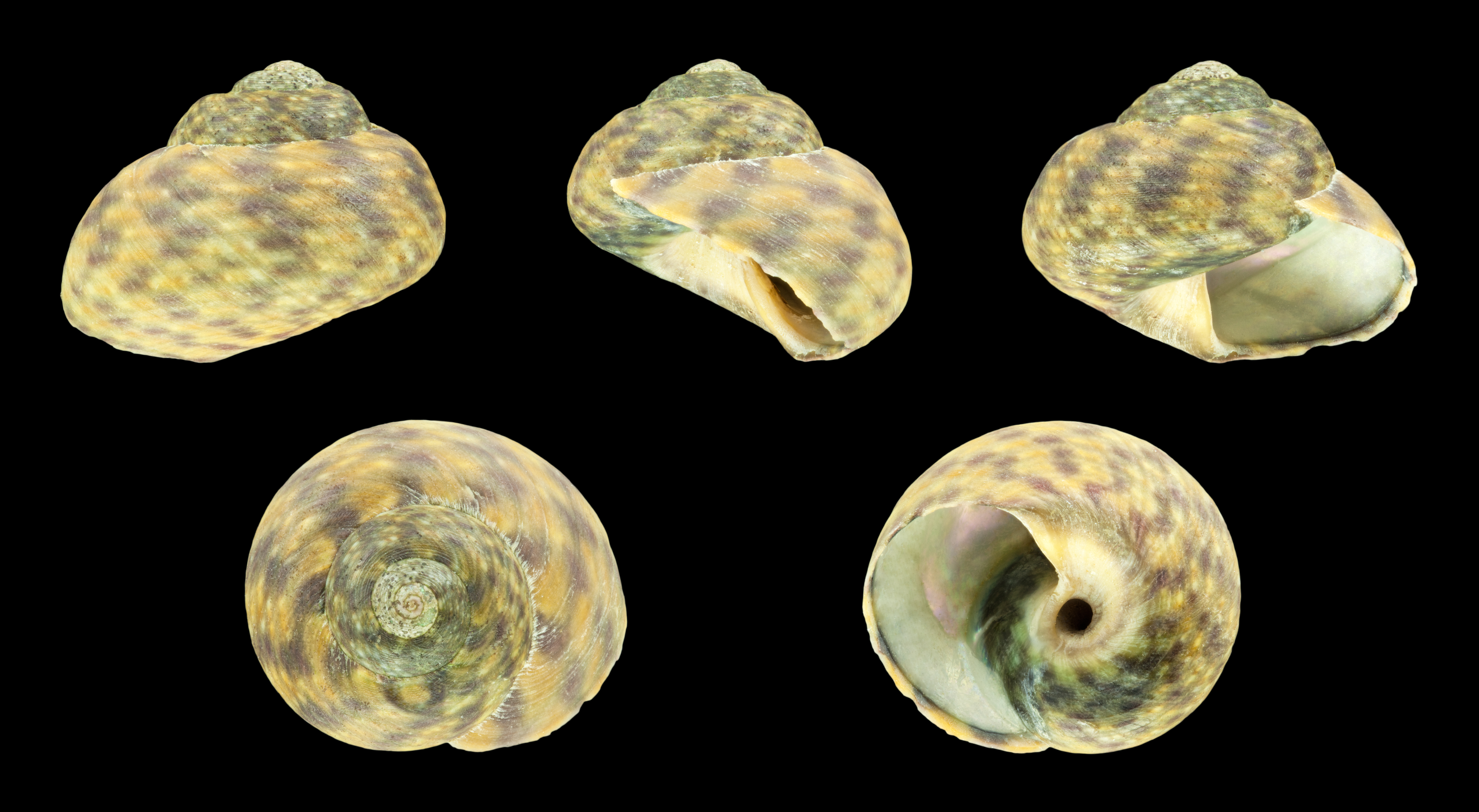
- Five views of a shell of Phorcus richardi

Scientific classification
- Kingdom: Animalia
- Phylum: Mollusca
- Class: Gastropoda
- Subclass: Vetigastropoda
- Order: Trochida
- Family: Trochidae
- Subfamily: Cantharidinae
- Genus: Phorcus
- Species: P. richardi

Binomial name
- Phorcus richardi (Payraudeau, 1826)

Synonyms
- Gibbula richardi Payraudeau, 1826; Gibbula richardi var. minima Pallary 1912; Monodonta richardi Payraudeau, 1826 (basionym); Phorcus richardi (Payraudeau, 1826); Trochus margaritaceus Risso, A., 1826; Trochus radiatus Anton, 1839; Trochus richardi (Payraudeau, 1826); Trochus richardi var. major Bucquoy, Dautzenberg & Dollfus, 1884; Trochus richardi var. pallida Bucquoy, Dautzenberg & Dollfus, 1884; Trochus richardi var. zigzag Bucquoy, Dautzenberg & Dollfus, 1884

= Phorcus richardi =

Species of gastropod

Phorcus richardi is a species of sea snail, a marine gastropod mollusk in the family Trochidae, the top snails.

== Description ==
The length of the shell varies between 10 mm and 23 mm. The umbilicate, conoidal shell is olivaceous or yellowish. It is ornamented with obliquely longitudinal tawny stripes. The entire surface is smooth. The conical spire is short. The sutures are deeply impressed. The five whorls are convex, the last one flattened and sloping around the upper part, and very obtusely subangular around the periphery. The large aperture is very oblique. The outer lip is thin, acute, and very narrowly margined with yellow, succeeded by a line of black, within which lies a band (about 2 mm wide) of opaque white. The columella is arcuate above, partly surrounding the umbilicus with a white callus. It is straightened in the middle. The umbilical tract lis arge, white, funnel-shaped, and bounded by a carina.

== Distribution ==
This species occurs in the Mediterranean Sea and the Adriatic Sea.
