= Pseudotalopia sakuraii =

Scientific classification
- Kingdom: Animalia
- Phylum: Mollusca
- Class: Gastropoda
- Subclass: Vetigastropoda
- Order: Trochida
- Family: Trochidae
- Subfamily: Cantharidinae
- Genus: Pseudotalopia
- Species: P. sakuraii

Binomial name
- Pseudotalopia sakuraii Habe, 1961

Species of gastropod

Pseudotalopia sakuraii is a species of sea snail, a marine gastropod mollusk in the family Trochidae, the top snails.

== Description ==
The size of the shell varies between 10 mm and 25 mm.

== Distribution ==
This marine species occurs off Japan and the Philippines.
