= Pagodatrochus variabilis =

Scientific classification
- Kingdom: Animalia
- Phylum: Mollusca
- Class: Gastropoda
- Subclass: Vetigastropoda
- Order: Trochida
- Superfamily: Trochoidea
- Family: Trochidae
- Subfamily: Cantharidinae
- Genus: Pagodatrochus
- Species: P. variabilis

Binomial name
- Pagodatrochus variabilis (H. Adams, 1873)

Synonyms
- Minolia eutyches Melvill, 1918; Minolia (Conotrochus) eutyches Melvill, 1918; Minolia variabilis H. Adams, 1873; Trochus (Gibbula) mariei Fischer, 1886; Trochus mariei Fischer, 1886

Species of gastropod

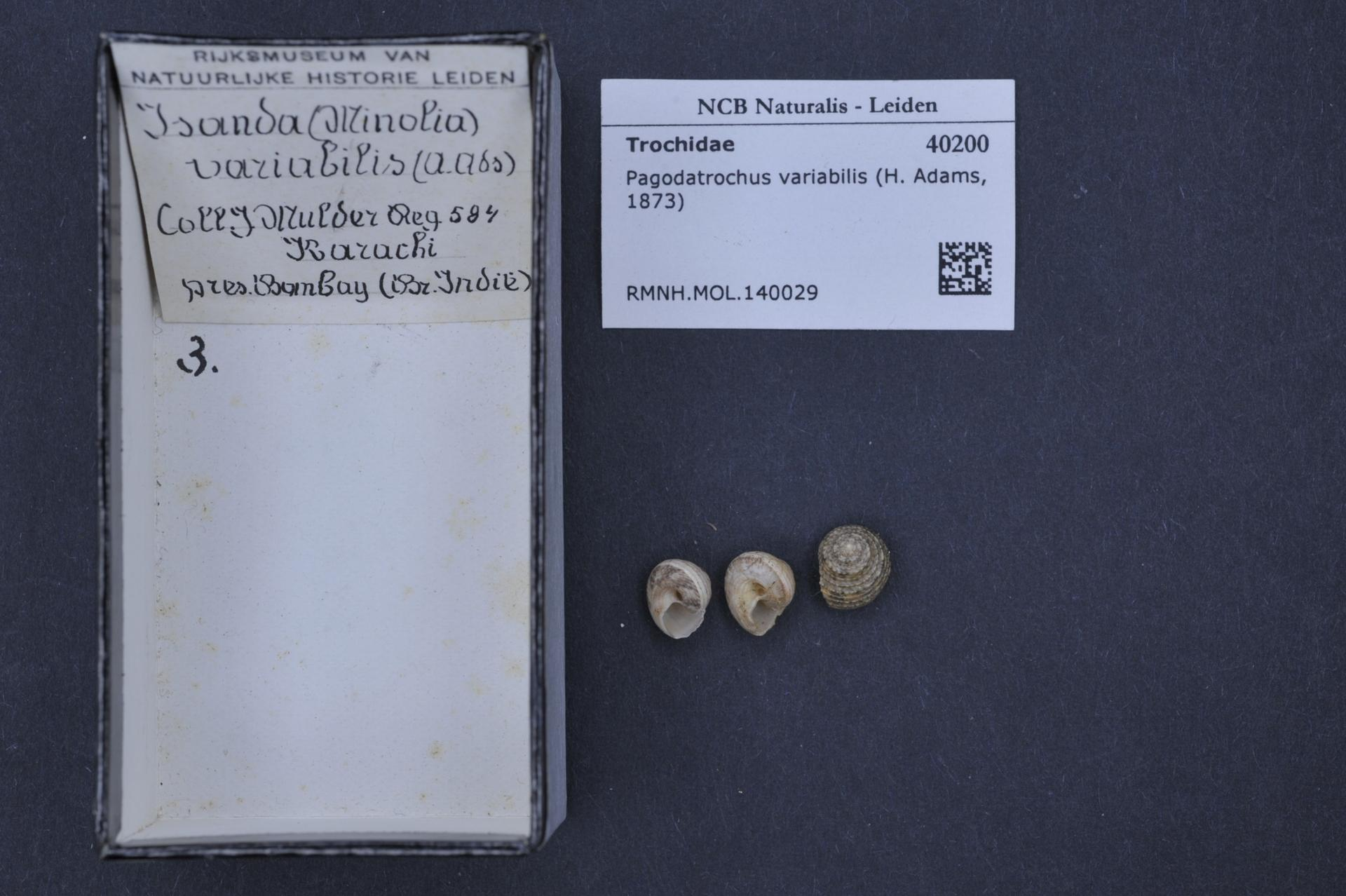
Pagodatrochus variabilis

Pagodatrochus variabilis is a species of sea snail, a marine gastropod mollusk in the family Trochidae.

== Description ==
The size of the shell varies between 3 mm and 7 mm.

== Distribution ==
This species occurs in the Red Sea and in the western Indian Ocean.
