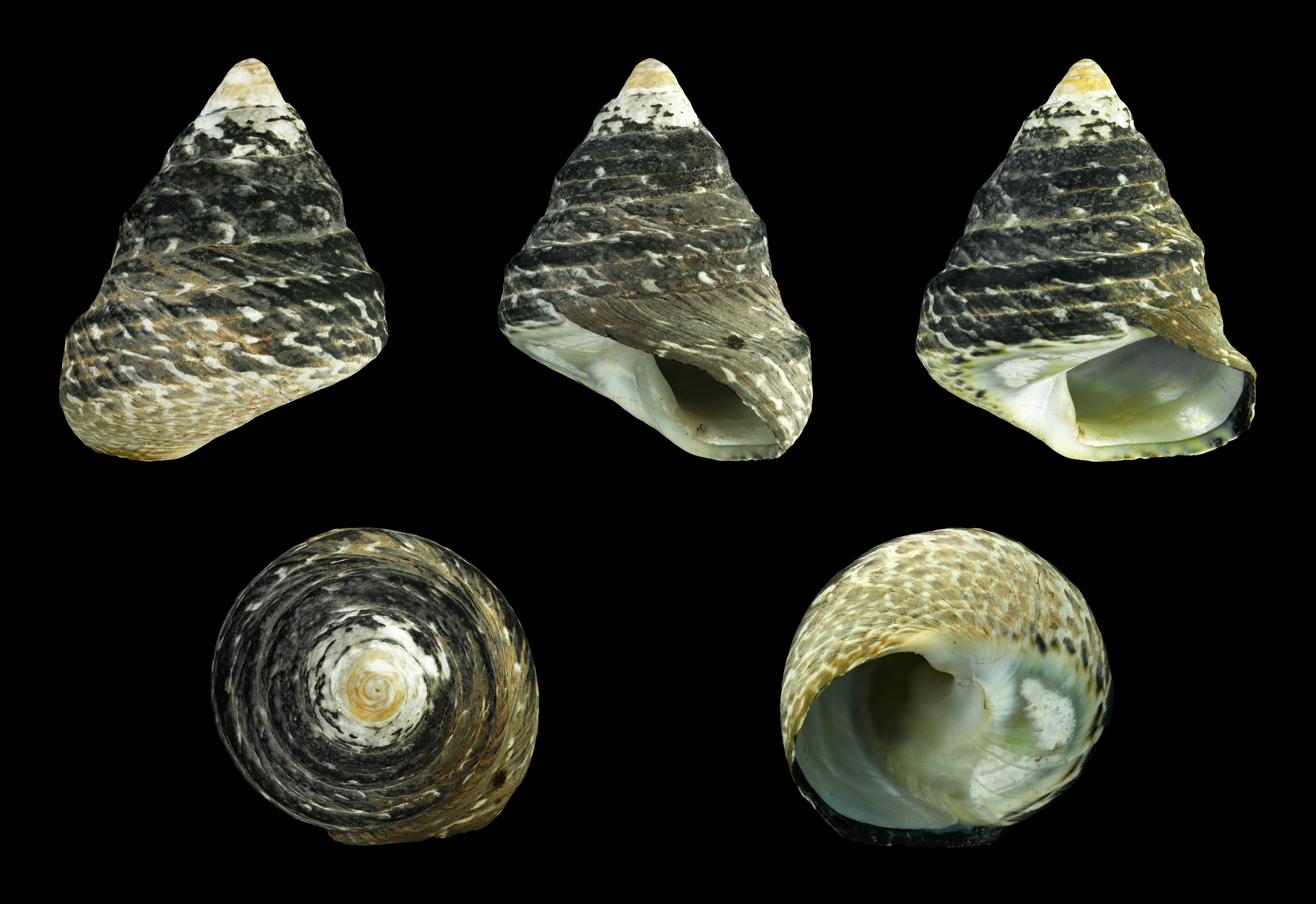
- A shell of Phorcus atratus

Scientific classification
- Kingdom: Animalia
- Phylum: Mollusca
- Class: Gastropoda
- Subclass: Vetigastropoda
- Order: Trochida
- Family: Trochidae
- Subfamily: Cantharidinae
- Genus: Phorcus
- Species: P. atratus

Binomial name
- Phorcus atratus (Wood, 1828)

Synonyms
- Monodonta colubrina Gould, A.A., 1849; Monodonta tamsi Dunker; Monodonta tesselata Deshayes, G.P.; Osilinus atratus (Wood, 1828); Osilinus atratus selvagensis Talavera 1978; Osilinus atratus trappei Nordsieck, 1974; Trochus atratus Wood W., 1828 (original description); Trochus tamsii Dunker in Philippi, 1845

= Phorcus atratus =

Species of gastropod

Phorcus atratus is a species of sea snail, a marine gastropod mollusk in the family Trochidae, the top snails.

== Description ==
The height of the shell varies between 17 mm and 24 mm, its diameter between 16 mm and 19 mm. The solid, imperforate shell has a conical shape. The spire is conical. The apical whorls are eroded, the following dull cinereous or purplish-black, marked with several spiral rows of white spots, or with longitudinal zigzag white stripes. The base of the shell is generally tessellated or striped with white. The shell contains 5 to 6 whorls. The upper ones are marked with spiral impressed lines in young specimens, and two carinae, the latter giving the body whorl a squarish form. The aperture is oblique. The lip is not much thickened within. The short columella is obsoletely subdentate at its base. Above at the insertion it shows a heavy white callous spread upon the base, invading the umbilicus, and wholly closing it, or leaving only a narrow pit.

This species is quite variable in coloration, the white appearing either in oblique zigzags or in spots. The young are perforate.

== Distribution ==
This marine species occurs in the following locations:

- Cape Verdes
- Canary Islands
- European waters (ERMS scope)
- Senegal
