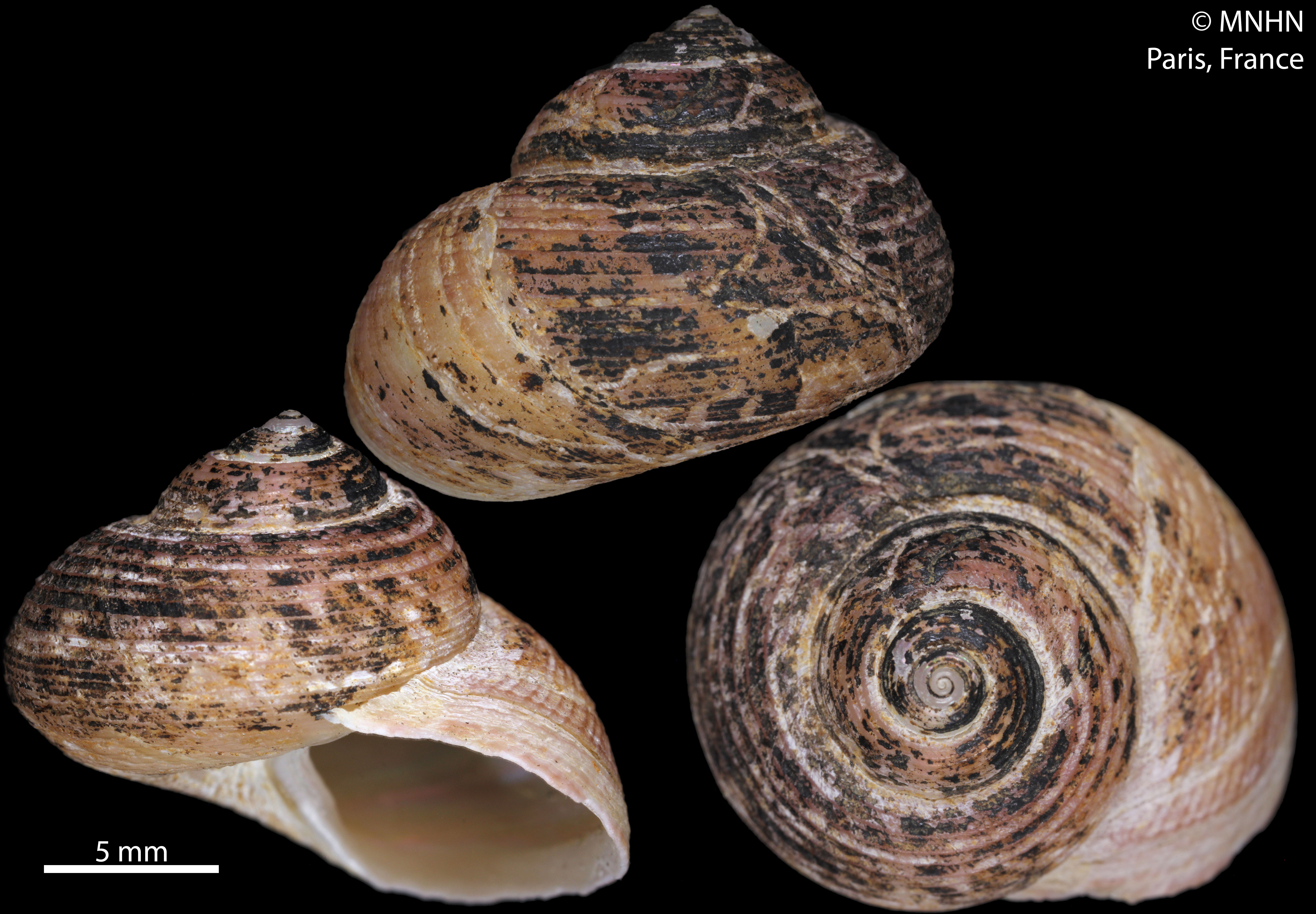
- Shell of Pseudotalopia fernandrikae (paratype at MNHN, Paris)

Scientific classification
- Kingdom: Animalia
- Phylum: Mollusca
- Class: Gastropoda
- Subclass: Vetigastropoda
- Order: Trochida
- Family: Trochidae
- Subfamily: Cantharidinae
- Genus: Pseudotalopia
- Species: P. fernandrikae

Binomial name
- Pseudotalopia fernandrikae Vilvens, 2005

= Pseudotalopia fernandrikae =

Species of gastropod

Pseudotalopia fernandrikae is a species of sea snail, a marine gastropod mollusk in the family Trochidae, the top snails.

== Description ==
The size of the shell varies between 8 mm and 18 mm.

== Distribution ==
This marine species occurs off the Philippines.
