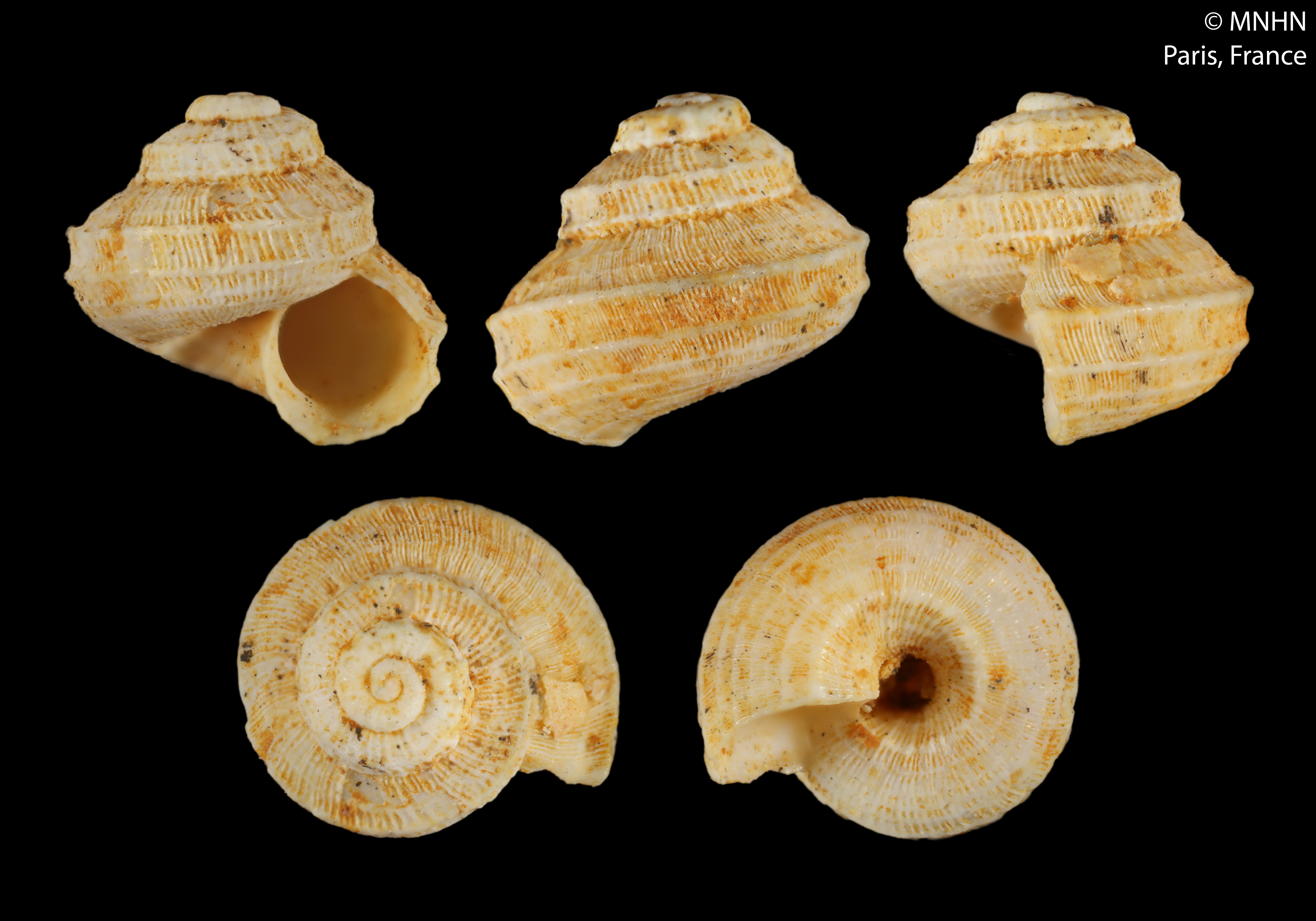
- Shell of Pagodatrochus antistitaensis (holotype at MNHN, Paris)

Scientific classification
- Kingdom: Animalia
- Phylum: Mollusca
- Class: Gastropoda
- Subclass: Vetigastropoda
- Order: Trochida
- Superfamily: Trochoidea
- Family: Trochidae
- Subfamily: Cantharidinae
- Genus: Pagodatrochus; Herbert, 1989

Type species
- Minolia variabilis H. Adams, 1873

Synonyms
- Conotrochus Pilsbry, 1889 (junior primary homonym of Conotrochus Seguenza, 1864 (Cnidaria)); Gibbula (Conotrochus) Pilsbry, 1889 (junior primary homonym of Conotrochus Seguenza, 1864 (Cnidaria)); Minolia (Conotrochus) Pilsbry, 1889; Solariella (Conotrochus) Pilsbry, 1889 (junior primary homonym of Conotrochus Seguenza, 1864 (Cnidaria))

= Pagodatrochus =

Genus of gastropods

Pagodatrochus is a genus of mostly small deep water sea snails, marine gastropod mollusks in the subfamily Cantharidinae of the family Trochidae.

== Species ==
Species within the genus Pagodatrochus include:

- †Pagodatrochus antistitensis Lozouet, 1998
- † Pagodatrochus sandbergeri (Füchs, 1869)
- Pagodatrochus variabilis (H. Adams, 1873)
