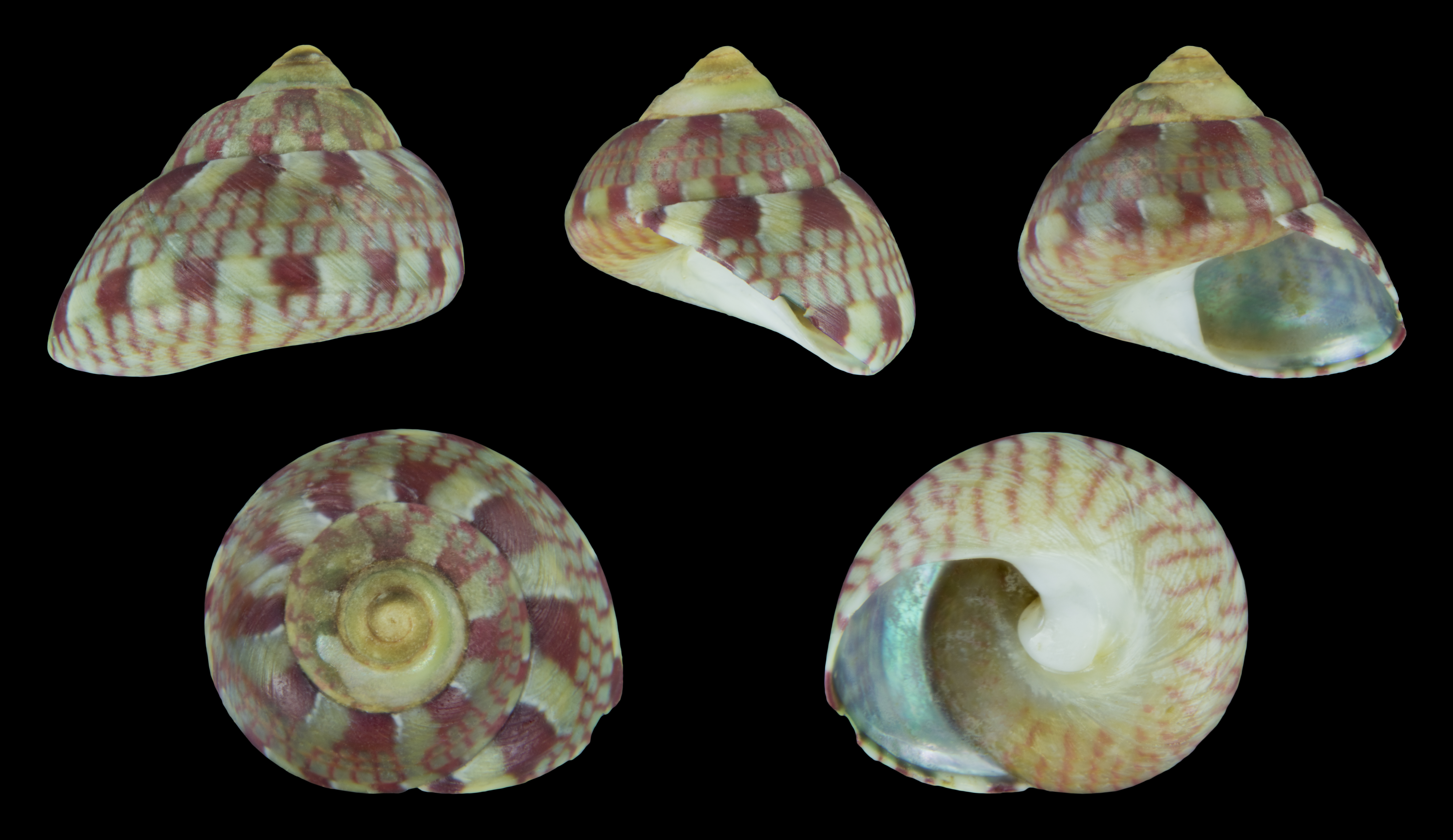
- A shell of Pictodiloma suavis

Scientific classification
- Kingdom: Animalia
- Phylum: Mollusca
- Class: Gastropoda
- Subclass: Vetigastropoda
- Order: Trochida
- Superfamily: Trochoidea
- Family: Trochidae
- Genus: Pictodiloma
- Species: P. suavis

Binomial name
- Pictodiloma suavis (Philippi, 1850)

Synonyms
- Diloma suavis (Philippi, 1850); Monodonta suavis Philippi, 1850; Oxystele koeneni Dunker, 1882; Trochus suavis Philippi, 1850

= Pictodiloma suavis =

Species of gastropod

Pictodiloma suavis is a species of sea snail, a marine gastropod mollusk in the family Trochidae, the top snails.

== Description ==
The shell grows to a length of 10 mm. The small, conical shell is imperforate, and rather solid but thin. It is pale olive or yellowish, with a broad spiral band of alternating crimson and white or greenish square blotches below the suture and another just above the periphery. The space between them occupied by several spiral bands of white or greenish, broken into squares by short vertical red lines, the base radiately marked with red lines. The spire is conical. The apex is acute, olive-colored when eroded through the white layer. The sutures are impressed. The spire contains five whorls, the last one flattened beneath. They are smooth except on the base, where fine concentric lines are visible under a lens. The aperture is oblique. The lip is thin, acute, brilliantly iridescent within with green predominating. The thin columella is arcuate, obviously toothed near its junction with the axis above, and covering the place of the umbilicus with a white pad of callus. The base of the shell is concave around the axis.

== Distribution ==
This marine species occurs off southern Japan and New Caledonia.
