= Komaitrochus pulcher =

Scientific classification
- Kingdom: Animalia
- Phylum: Mollusca
- Class: Gastropoda
- Subclass: Vetigastropoda
- Order: Trochida
- Superfamily: Trochoidea
- Family: Trochidae
- Genus: Komaitrochus
- Species: K. pulcher

Binomial name
- Komaitrochus pulcher Kuroda, T. & I. Taki in Kuroda, T., 1958

Species of gastropod

Komaitrochus pulcher is a species of sea snail, a marine gastropod mollusk in the family Trochidae, the top snails

== Description ==
The size of the adult shell of this species varies between 6 mm and 18 mm.

== Distribution ==
This marine species occurs off Taiwan.
