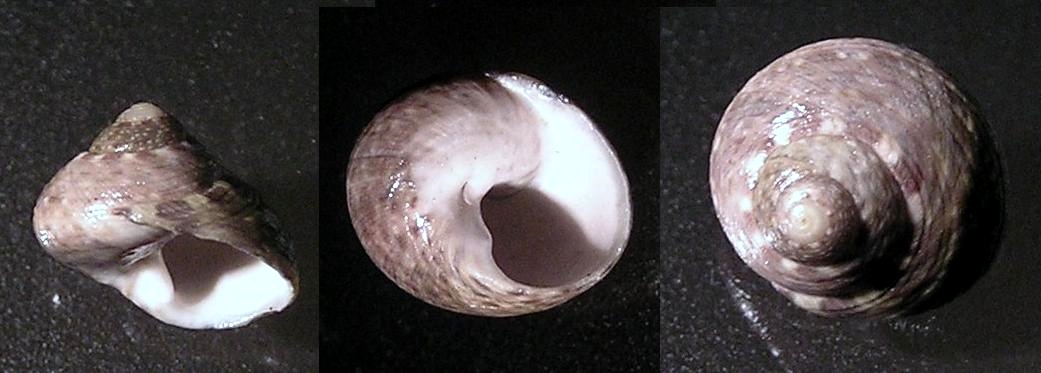
- Phorcus mutabilis

Scientific classification
- Kingdom: Animalia
- Phylum: Mollusca
- Class: Gastropoda
- Subclass: Vetigastropoda
- Order: Trochida
- Family: Trochidae
- Subfamily: Cantharidinae
- Genus: Phorcus; Risso, 1826

Type species
- Trochus margaritaceus Risso, A., 1826

Synonyms
- Caragolus Monterosato, 1884; Monodonta (Osilinus) Philippi, 1847; Neptheusa Leach, 1852; Osilinus Philippi, 1847; Osilinus (Mutilastra) F. Nordsieck, 1974; Osilinus (Pseudosilinus) F. Nordsieck, 1974; Trochocochlea Mörch, 1852; Trochus (Phorcus) Risso, 1826

= Phorcus =

Genus of gastropods

Phorcus is a genus of sea snails, marine gastropod mollusks in the subfamily Cantharidinae of the family Trochidae, the top snails.

== Distribution ==
These marine species are algal grazers in the northeastern Atlantic Ocean and Mediterranean Sea.

== Species ==
Species within the genus Phorcus include:

- Phorcus articulatus (Lamarck, 1822)
- Phorcus atratus (Wood, 1828)
- † Phorcus burgadoi Martín-González, 2018
- † Phorcus gallicophorcus Landau, Van Dingenen & Ceulemans, 2017
- Phorcus lineatus (da Costa, 1778)
- Phorcus mariae Templado & Rolán, 2012
- Phorcus mutabilis (Philippi, 1846)
- Phorcus punctulatus (Lamarck, 1822)
- Phorcus richardi (Payraudeau, 1826)
- Phorcus sauciatus (Koch, 1845)
- Phorcus turbinatus (Born, 1780)

Species brought into synonymy

- Phorcus margaritaceus Risso, 1826: synonym of Phorcus richardi (Payraudeau, 1826)
- Phorcus semigranosus A. Adams, 1851: synonym of Chlorostoma semigranosum A. Adams, 1851
