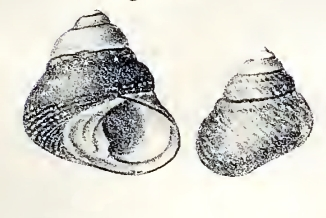
- Drawing with two views of a shell of Phorcus punctulatus

Scientific classification
- Kingdom: Animalia
- Phylum: Mollusca
- Class: Gastropoda
- Subclass: Vetigastropoda
- Order: Trochida
- Family: Trochidae
- Subfamily: Cantharidinae
- Genus: Phorcus
- Species: P. punctulatus

Binomial name
- Phorcus punctulatus (Lamarck, 1822)

Synonyms
- Monodonta osilin Deshayes in Lamarck; Monodonta punctulata Lamarck, 1822 (original description); Osilinus punctulatus (Lamarck, 1822); Trochus punctulatus Philippi

= Phorcus punctulatus =

Species of gastropod

Phorcus punctulatus, common name the punctate monodont, is a species of sea snail, a marine gastropod mollusk in the family Trochidae, the top snails.

== Description ==
The size of the shell varies between 15 mm and 20 mm. The solid, imperforate shell has a conical shape. It is, deep purplish-brown or blackish, dotted with white, the dots sometimes forming spiral series, and always elongated in the direction of the spiral. The surface is nearly smooth, sometimes showing traces of spiral grooves, which are always visible on the young. The spire is conoid. The apex is generally eroded and orange-colored. The 6 whorls are convex. The body whorl is somewhat flattened or subconcave around the upper part. The base of the shell is convex, eroded and white in front of the aperture. The aperture is half-circular. The outer lip is not much thickened, edged with black, beautifully iridescent within, with amethystine tints. The columella is short, obtusely subdentate at the base, expanding above into a callus, which covers the axis and the umbilicus, or leaves a slight excavation or groove.

== Distribution ==
This species occurs in the Atlantic Ocean off Senegal and Gambia.
