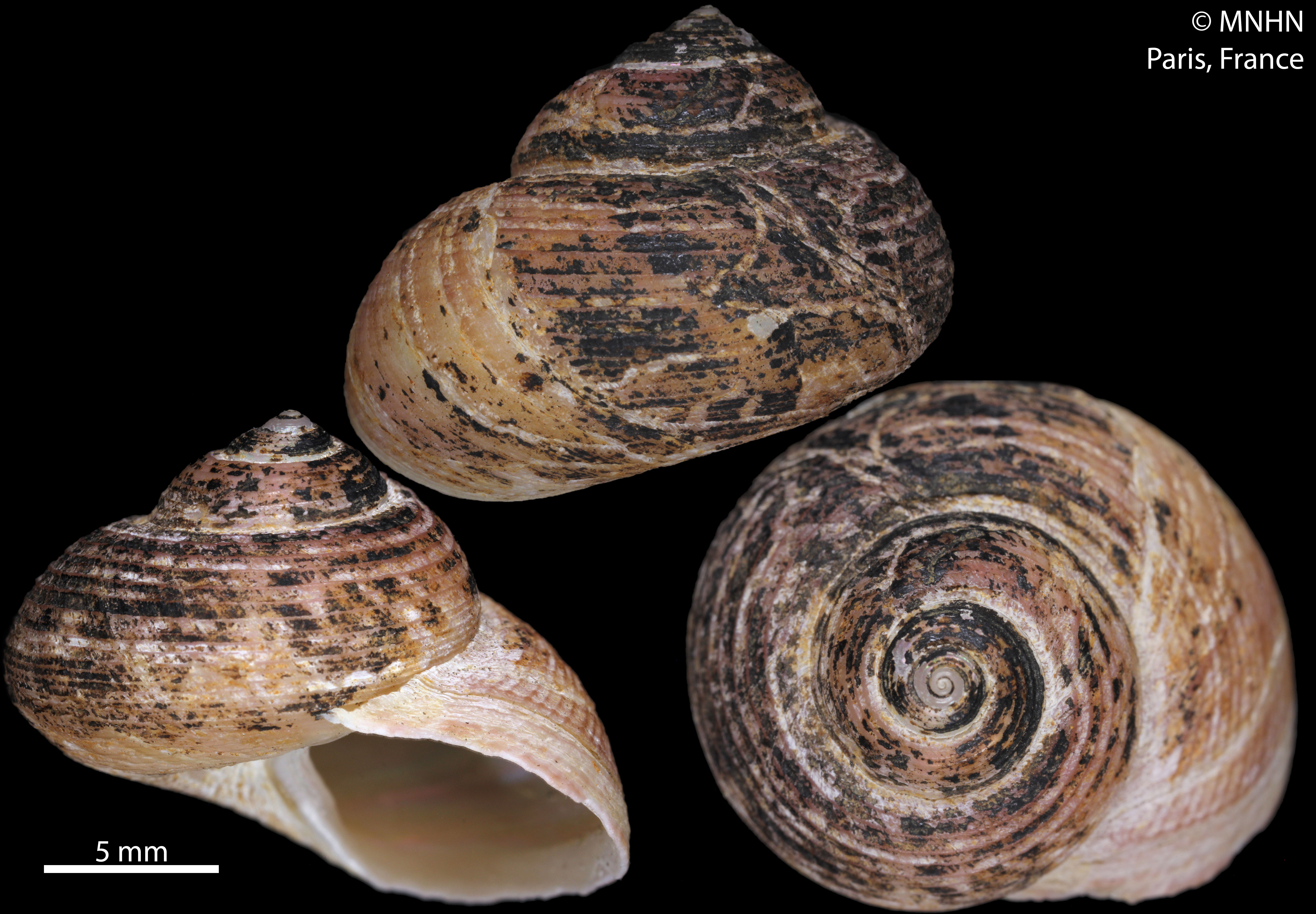
- Pseudotalopia fernandrikae

Scientific classification
- Kingdom: Animalia
- Phylum: Mollusca
- Class: Gastropoda
- Subclass: Vetigastropoda
- Order: Trochida
- Superfamily: Trochoidea
- Family: Trochidae
- Subfamily: Cantharidinae
- Genus: Pseudotalopia; Habe, 1961

Type species
- Pseudotalopia sakuraii Habe, 1961

= Pseudotalopia =

Genus of gastropods

Pseudotalopia is a genus of sea snails, marine gastropod mollusks in the subfamily Cantharidinae of the family Trochidae, the top snails.

== Species ==
Species within the genus Pseudotalopia include:

- Pseudotalopia fernandrikae Vilvens, 2005
- Pseudotalopia rainesi Poppe, Tagaro & Goto, 2018
- Pseudotalopia sakuraii Habe, 1961
- Pseudotalopia taiwanensis (Chen, 2006)
