= Roseaplagis =

Scientific classification
- Kingdom: Animalia
- Phylum: Mollusca
- Class: Gastropoda
- Subclass: Vetigastropoda
- Order: Trochida
- Superfamily: Trochoidea
- Family: Trochidae
- Subfamily: Cantharidinae
- Genus: Roseaplagis; K. M. Donald & Spencer, 2016

Type species
- Canthiridus rufozona A. Adams, 1853

Genus of snails

Roseaplagis is a small genus of sea snails in the family Trochidae, the top snails.

== Species ==
There are four species in the genus Roseaplagis:

- Roseaplagis artizona (A. Adams, 1853)
- Roseaplagis caelatus (Hutton, 1884)
- Roseaplagis mortenseni (Odhner, 1924)
- Roseaplagis rufozona (A. Adams, 1853)
