= Micrelenchus sanguineus =

- Drawing of a shell of Micrelenchus sanguineus

Scientific classification
- Kingdom: Animalia
- Phylum: Mollusca
- Class: Gastropoda
- Subclass: Vetigastropoda
- Order: Trochida
- Superfamily: Trochoidea
- Family: Trochidae
- Genus: Micrelenchus
- Species: M. sanguineus

Binomial name
- Micrelenchus sanguineus (Gray in Dieffenbach, 1843)

Synonyms
- Cantharidus oliveri Iredale, 1915; Cantharidus pupillus Suter, 1913; Cantharidus sanguineus (Gray, 1843); Micrelenchus sanguineus (Gray): Suter, 1913; Micrelenchus oliveri (Iredale): Finlay, 1926; Micrelenchus oliver cryptus (Iredale): Powell, 1946; Plumbelenchus cryptus Powell, A.W.B., 1946; Trochus sanguineus Gray, 1843; Trochus (Gibbiun) sanguineus Gray, J.E. in Dieffenbach, 1843 (original description)

Species of gastropod

Micrelenchus sanguineus is a species of small sea snail, a marine gastropod mollusc in the family Trochidae, the top shells.

Subspecies

- Cantharidus sanguineus bakeri Fleming, 1948: synonym of Roseaplagis artizona A. Adams, 1853
- Cantharidus sanguineus var. elongatus Suter, 1897:synonym of Roseaplagis artizona A. Adams, 1853
- Cantharidus sanguineus cryptus (Powell, 1946): synonym of Micrelenchus sanguineus (Gray in Dieffenbach, 1843)

== Description ==
The shell grows to a length of 9 mm, its diameter 7 mm. The small, imperforate shell has a conical shape. It is greenish or whitish with bloodred spots. Its sculpture consists of spiral cinguli with very narrow grooves between them, 5 to 6 on the penultimate and 10 to 14 on the body whorl. Sometimes these are slightly moniliform. The base contains about 5 cinguli. The colour of the shell is green, with oblique longitudinal rows of blood-red spots on the cinguli. The first three whorls are sometimes reddish or brownish with radiate white streaks, below the suture very often tessellated with white, brown, and red.

The acute spire is elevated conical, with sides slightly convex. The protoconch is conic with 1½ strongly convex smooth whorls, which are mostly pearly. The six whorls of the spire are flatly convex, the last angled at the periphery. The base of the shell is slightly convex. The sutures are impressed. The oblique aperture is iridescent and lirate within. The outer lip is solid, often strengthened within by a white callosity. The arcuate columella is nearly vertical. The inner lip spreads a little over the umbilical tract, which is impressed and concave. The parietal wall contains a more or less thick callus.

== Distribution ==
This marine species is endemic to New Zealand and occurs off the coasts of North, South and Stewart Island.
