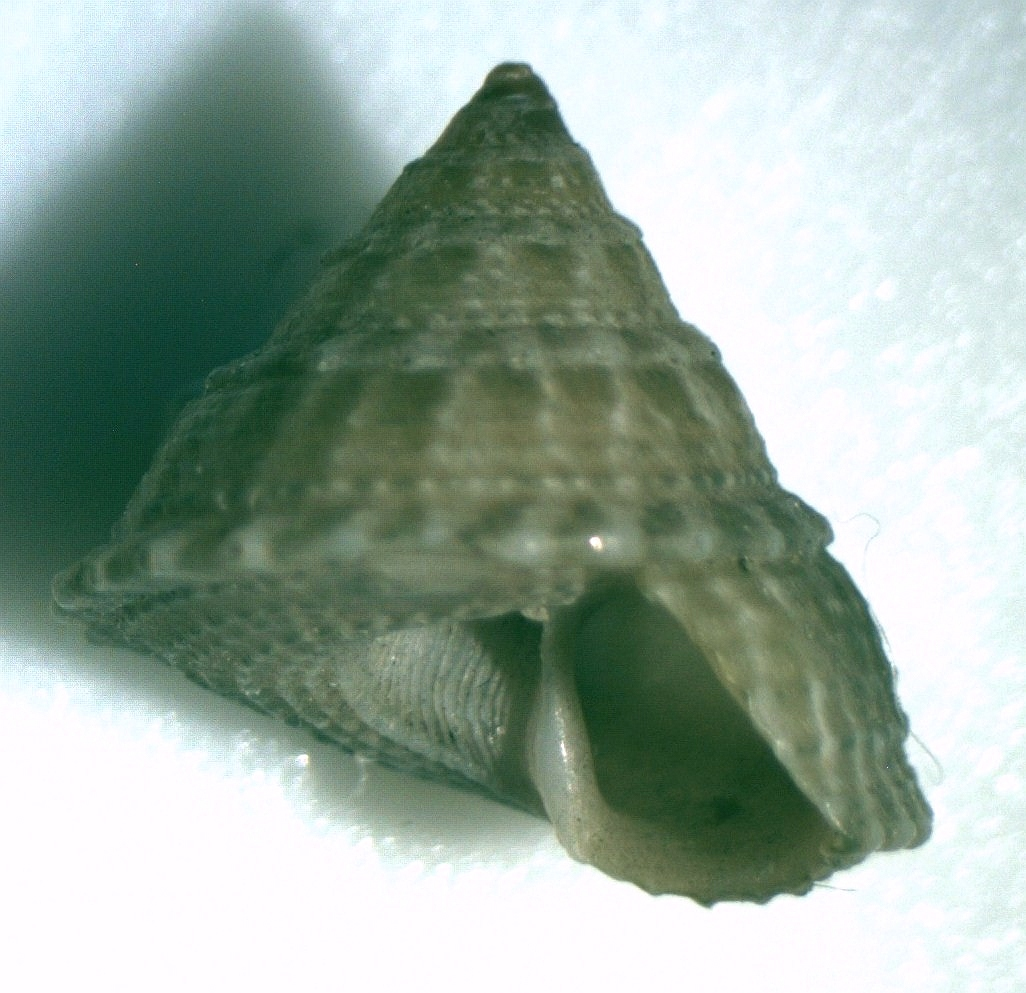
- Apertural view of a shell of Agagus agagus

Scientific classification
- Kingdom: Animalia
- Phylum: Mollusca
- Class: Gastropoda
- Subclass: Vetigastropoda
- Order: Trochida
- Superfamily: Trochoidea
- Family: Trochidae
- Genus: Agagus
- Species: A. agagus

Binomial name
- Agagus agagus Jousseaume, 1894

Synonyms
- Gibbula (Enida) townsendi G.B. Sowerby III, 1895; Gibbula perspectiva G.B. Sowerby III, 1900; Gibbula townsendi Sowerby III, 1895; Notogibbula townsendi (Sowerby III, 1895)

= Agagus agagus =

Species of gastropod

Agagus agagus is a species of sea snail, a marine gastropod mollusk in the family Trochidae, the top snails.

== Description ==
The shell grows to a length of 9 mm, its diameter 10 mm. The umbilicate shell has a depressed conical shape with a swollen base. Its color is a vivid white with green spots. It contains 6½ sharp declining whorls with longitudinal oblique striae and spiral ribs. The aperture is subquadrangular. The outer lip is sharp.

== Distribution ==
This species occurs in the Red Sea and in the Indian Ocean off Tanzania and South Africa.
