= Roseaplagis rufozona =

Scientific classification
- Kingdom: Animalia
- Phylum: Mollusca
- Class: Gastropoda
- Subclass: Vetigastropoda
- Order: Trochida
- Family: Trochidae
- Subfamily: Cantharidinae
- Genus: Roseaplagis
- Species: R. rufozona

Binomial name
- Roseaplagis rufozona (A. Adams, 1853)

Synonyms
- Cantharidus rufozona A. Adams, 1853 (original combination); Canthiridus rufozona A. Adams, 1853; Micrelenchus rufozonus (A. Adams, 1853); Micrelenchus (Plumbelenchus) rufozona (A. Adams, 1853)

Species of gastropod

Roseaplagis rufozona is a species of sea snail in the family Trochidae, the top snails.

== Description ==
The length of the shell varies between 4 mm and 8 mm. The small, rather thin, imperforate shell has a globosely conoidal shape. Its sculpture consists of distant rounded spiral cinguli, 5 on the penultimate, 13 on the body whorl with smooth interstices. Its colour is white or cinereous. The spiral riblets are rufous or pinkish brown.

The spire is conoidal with an acute apex. The sides are slightly convex. The small protoconch is conic with about 2 whorls. These are convex and spirally lirate, mostly eroded. The spire contains about 5 whorls, the body whorl rather large, and rounded at the periphery The base of the shell is convex. The suture is impressed. The subquadrangular aperture is iridescent and lirate within. The outer lip slightly indented, sharp, articulated with pinkish-brown, with an inner opaque white band. The white columella is vertical, with a slight tubercle in the middle, often obsolete. The inner lip has a small expansion beyond the columella, but perfectly filling up the perforation. There is a thin white callus on the parietal wall.

== Distribution ==
This marine species is endemic to and occurs off North Island, New Zealand.
