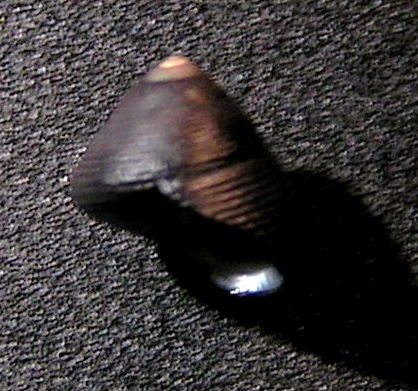
- Apertural view of a shell of Micrelenchus tenebrosus

Scientific classification
- Kingdom: Animalia
- Phylum: Mollusca
- Class: Gastropoda
- Subclass: Vetigastropoda
- Order: Trochida
- Superfamily: Trochoidea
- Family: Trochidae
- Genus: Micrelenchus
- Species: M. tenebrosus

Binomial name
- Micrelenchus tenebrosus (A. Adams, 1853)

Synonyms
- Cantharidus parcipictus Powell, 1946; Cantharidus tenebrosus A. Adams, 1853 (original combination); Gibbula dolorosa Tenison Woods, 1877; Micrelenchus (Micrelenchus) tenebrosus (A. Adams, 1853); Micrelenchus parcipictus Powell, 1946; Micrelenchus tenebrosus (A. Adams, 1853)

= Micrelenchus tenebrosus =

Species of gastropod

Micrelenchus tenebrosus is a species of sea snail, a marine gastropod mollusk in the family Trochidae, the top snails.

== Description ==
The shell grows to a length of 6 mm . The solid, conical shell is elevated, imperforate, and rather thick. Its color is dark bluish-black, or with a purple shade. The spire is conoidal. The sutures are slightly impressed. The apex is somewhat obtuse, a trifle eroded and whitish at the tip. The six whorls are very slightly convex, those of the spire encircled by about seven lirae of about the same width as their interstices. The body whorl is very bluntly subangular at the periphery, with about 20 spiral lirae, and fine delicate growth lines. The aperture is rounded-quadrate, oblique, less than ½ the total length of the shell. The outer lip is very narrowly black-edged. It isbordered by a series of short fine sulcations, beyond which there is a porcellaneous thickening. The throat is nacreous, iridescent, the reflections mainly green. The columella is subvertical, a trifle arcuate, rounded and pillar-like, covering the umbilicus above. The parietal wall has a thin whitish callus. The upper angle of the aperture is angular and slightly channeled.

== Distribution ==
This marine species is endemic to New Zealand and occurs off North Island, South and Stewart Island
