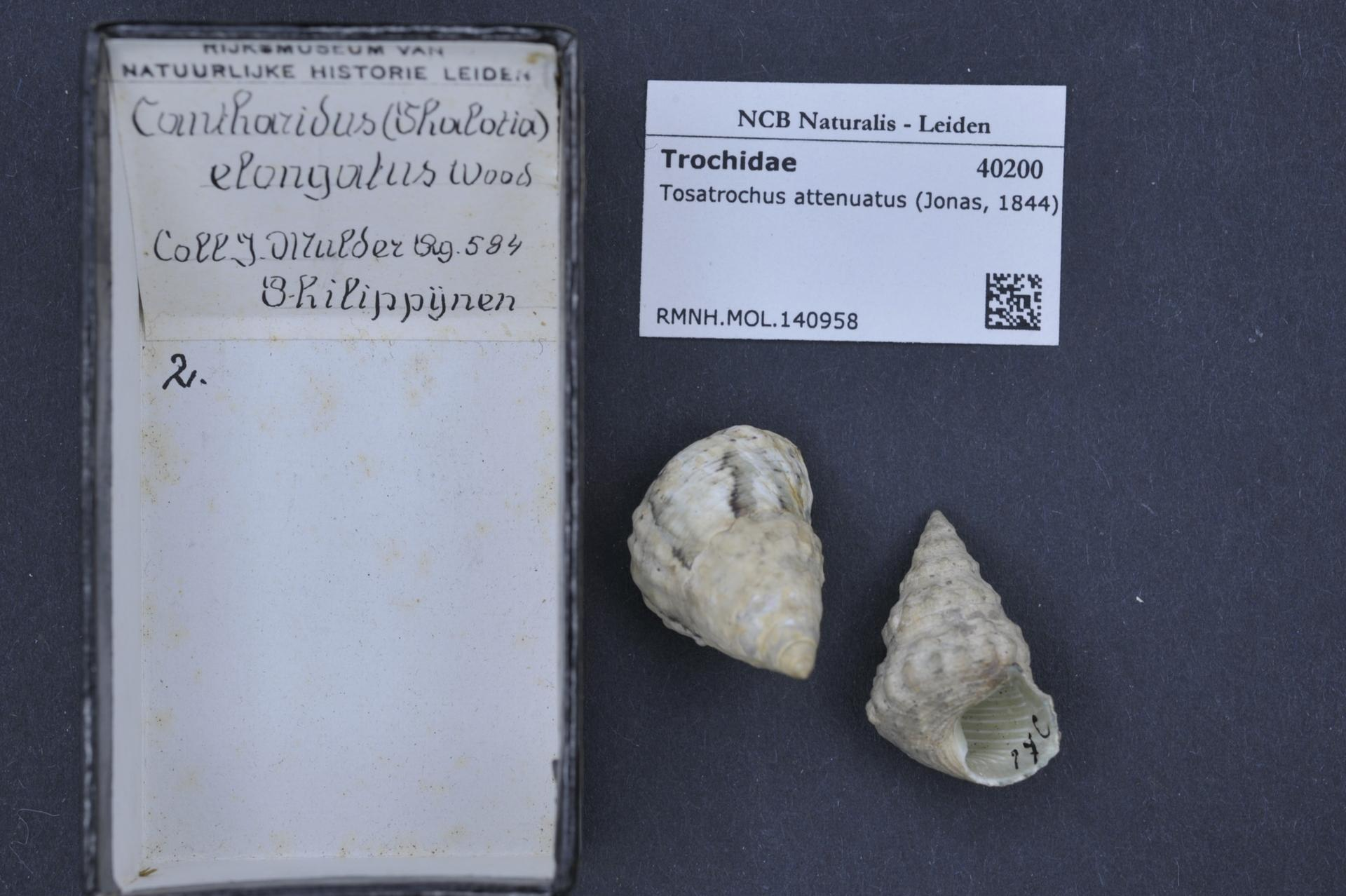
- Shells

Scientific classification
- Kingdom: Animalia
- Phylum: Mollusca
- Class: Gastropoda
- Subclass: Vetigastropoda
- Order: Trochida
- Superfamily: Trochoidea
- Family: Trochidae
- Genus: Tosatrochus; MacNeil, 1961
- Species: T. attenuatus

Binomial name
- Tosatrochus attenuatus (Jonas, 1844)

Synonyms
- Thalotia aspera Kuroda & Habe, 1952; Thalotia elongatus Wood, W., 1828; Tosatrochus asperus Kuroda, T. & T. Habe, 1952; Trochus attenuatus Jonas, 1844; Trochus elongatus Wood, 1828

= Tosatrochus =

Genus of molluscs

Tosatrochus attenuatus is a species of sea snail in the subfamily Cantharidinae of the family Trochidae, the top snails. It is the only species in the genus Tosatrochus.

== Description ==
The length of the shell varies between 20 mm and 25 mm. The thick, imperforate or very narrowly perforate shell has a conic-elongated shape. It is whitish, ornamented with radiating livid-brown flammules, brown punctulate. The 9 whorls are convex, spirally lirate (the lirae unequal) and longitudinally nodose-costate, the nodules more prominent below. The sutures are impressed. The angulated body whorl is depressed beneath the sutures and nodulous at the periphery. It is very convex and with about 8 concentric lirae beneath, the interstices with intercalated lirulae. The aperture is subquadrate and canaliculate within. The basal margin is arcuate and plicate. The columella is subangular, concave, strongly truncate at base, with a short callus over the umbilicus.

== Distribution ==
This species occurs in the Indo-West Pacific and off the Philippines and South Australia.
