= Micrelenchus burchorum =

Conservation status
- Naturally Uncommon (NZ TCS)

Scientific classification
- Kingdom: Animalia
- Phylum: Mollusca
- Class: Gastropoda
- Subclass: Vetigastropoda
- Order: Trochida
- Superfamily: Trochoidea
- Family: Trochidae
- Genus: Micrelenchus
- Species: M. burchorum

Binomial name
- Micrelenchus burchorum (Marshall, 1998)

Synonyms
- Cantharidus burchorum B. A. Marshall, 1998; Micrelenchus (Mawhero) burchorum (B. A. Marshall, 1998)· accepted, alternate representation

Species of gastropod

Micrelenchus burchorum is a species of sea snail, a marine gastropod mollusc in the family Trochidae, the top snails.

== Description ==
The height of the shell attains 26 mm, its diameter 16 mm.

== Distribution ==
This marine species is endemic to New Zealand and occurs off Three Kings Islands.
