= Micrelenchus tessellatus =

Scientific classification
- Kingdom: Animalia
- Phylum: Mollusca
- Class: Gastropoda
- Subclass: Vetigastropoda
- Order: Trochida
- Superfamily: Trochoidea
- Family: Trochidae
- Genus: Micrelenchus
- Species: M. tessellatus

Binomial name
- Micrelenchus tessellatus (A. Adams, 1853)

Synonyms
- Cantharidella tesselata (A. Adams, 1853) (unaccepted lisspelling); Cantharidus tesselatus (sic) (misspelling); Chrysostoma inconspicua Hutton, 1873; Gibbula nitida A. Adams & Angas, 1864; Margarita tesselata (sic) (misspelling dating from Finlay, 1926); Margarita tessellata A. Adams, 1853 (superseded combination); Micrelenchus (Micrelenchus) tesselatus (A. Adams, 1853)· accepted, alternate representation; Talopena sublaevis Finlay, 1924

Species of gastropod

Micrelenchus tessellatus is a species of sea snail, a marine gastropod mollusk in the family Trochidae, the top snails.

== Description ==
The shell grows to a length of 5 mm.

== Distribution ==
This marine species is endemic to New Zealand and occurs off North, South and Stewart Island.
