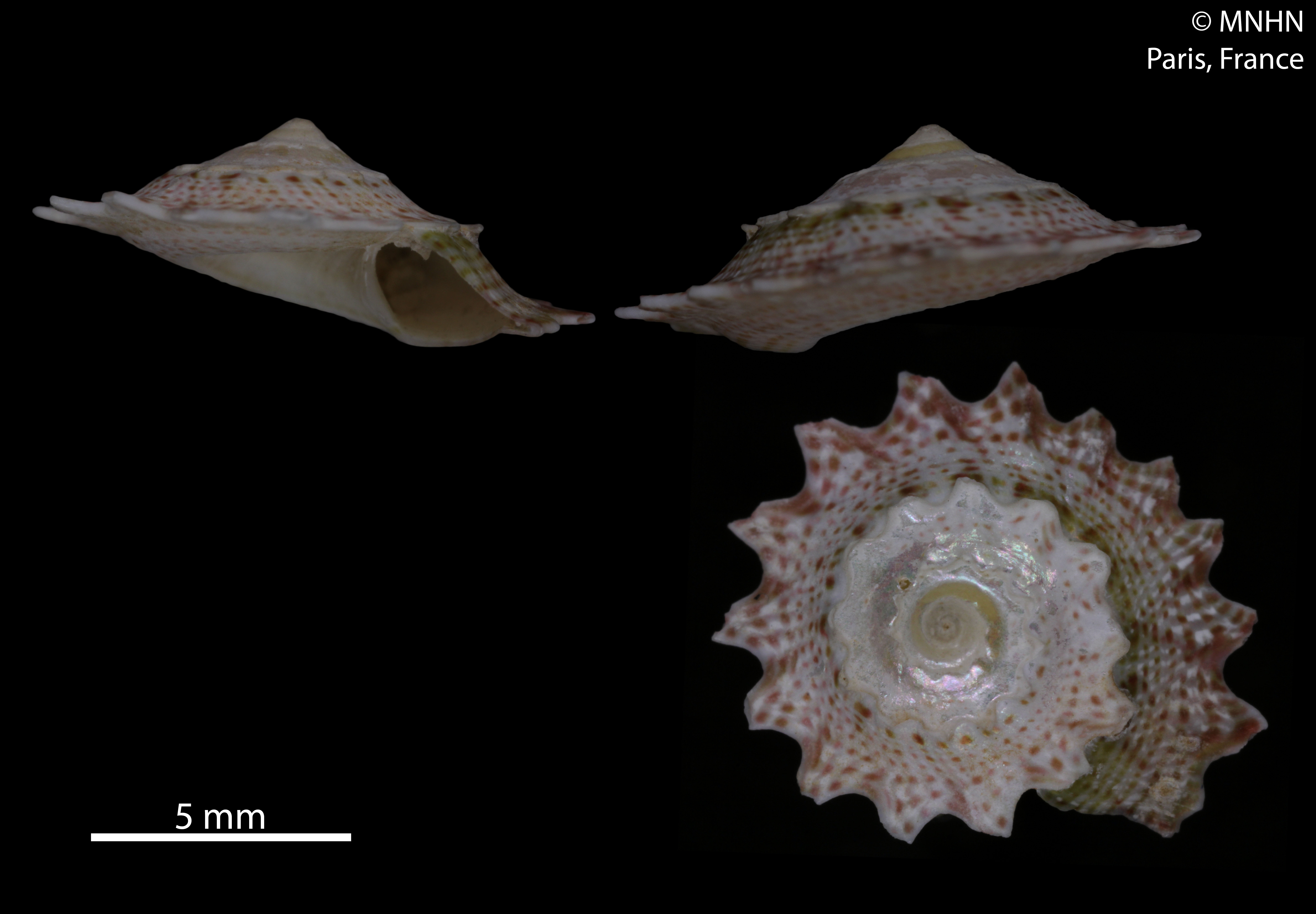
- Shell of Agagus stellamaris (paratype at MNHN, Paris)

Scientific classification
- Kingdom: Animalia
- Phylum: Mollusca
- Class: Gastropoda
- Subclass: Vetigastropoda
- Order: Trochida
- Superfamily: Trochoidea
- Family: Trochidae
- Genus: Agagus
- Species: A. stellamaris

Binomial name
- Agagus stellamaris Herbert, 1991

= Agagus stellamaris =

Species of gastropod

Agagus stellamaris is a species of sea snail, a marine gastropod mollusk in the family Trochidae, the top snails.

== Description ==
The shell grows to a length of 10 mm.

== Distribution ==
This marine species occurs off KwaZulu-Natal, South Africa and off East Africa.
