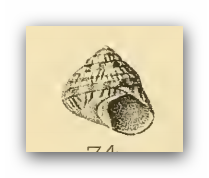
- Pictodiloma suavis(Philippi, 1850); family Trochidae; Japan

Scientific classification
- Kingdom: Animalia
- Phylum: Mollusca
- Class: Gastropoda
- Subclass: Vetigastropoda
- Order: Trochida
- Superfamily: Trochoidea
- Family: Trochidae
- Genus: Pictodiloma; Habe, 1946

= Pictodiloma =

Genus of gastropods

Pictodiloma is a genus of sea snails, marine gastropod mollusks in the family Trochidae, the top snails.

== Species ==
Species within the genus Pictodiloma include:

- Pictodiloma suavis (Philippi, 1850)
