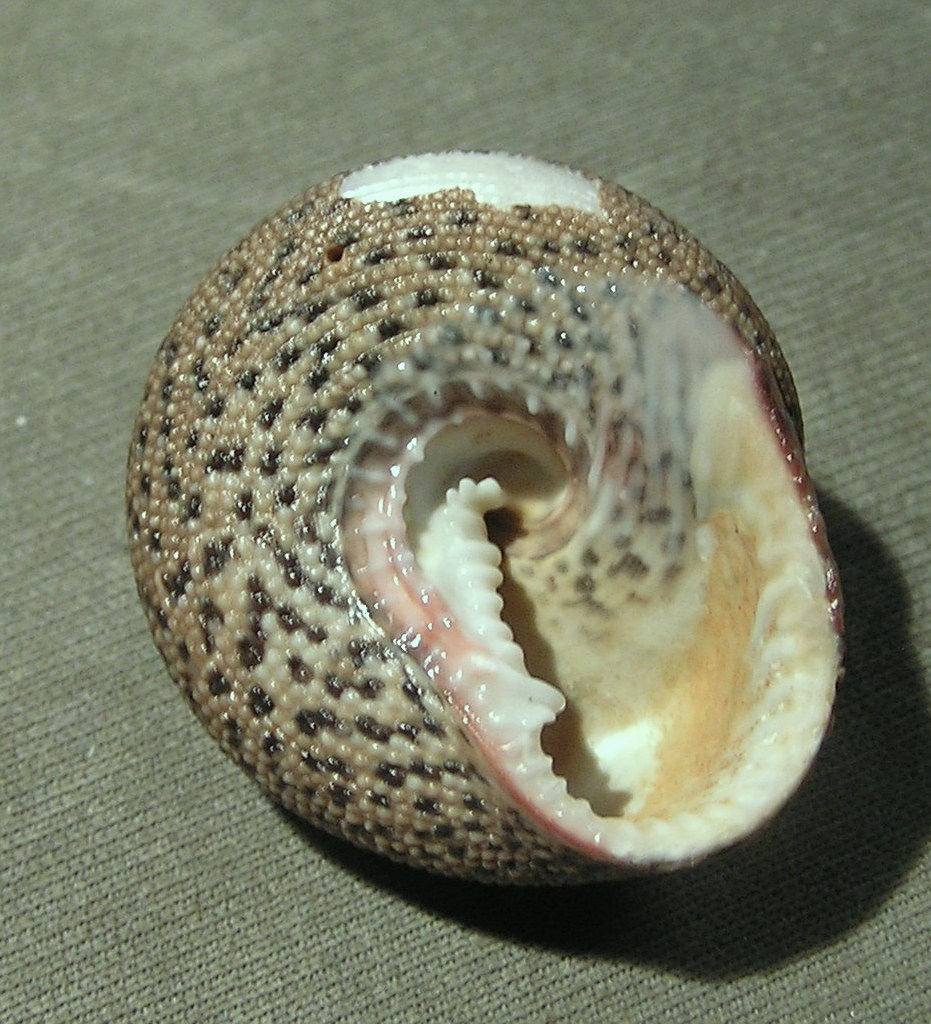
- Apertural view of a shell of Clanculus undatus

Scientific classification
- Kingdom: Animalia
- Phylum: Mollusca
- Class: Gastropoda
- Subclass: Vetigastropoda
- Order: Trochida
- Superfamily: Trochoidea
- Family: Trochidae
- Genus: Clanculus
- Species: C. undatus

Binomial name
- Clanculus undatus Lamarck, 1816

Synonyms
- Clanculus (Macroclanculus) undatus (Lamarck, J.B.P.A. de, 1816); Macroclanculus occiduus Cotton & Godfrey, 1934; Monodonta undata Lamarck; Trochus smithi Wood, 1828; Trochus undatus Lamarck, 1816 (original description)

= Clanculus undatus =

Species of gastropod

Clanculus undatus, common name the wavy Australian monodont, is a species of sea snail, a marine gastropod mollusk in the family Trochidae, the top snails.

== Description ==
The size of the shell varies between 20 mm and 40 mm. It is one of the largest species of Clanculus. The large shell has a depressed conoid shape. It is excavated and false-umbilicate in the center beneath. It is cinereous or rose colored, radiately striped with brown or black. The stripes are sometimes broken into irregular maculations, especially on the base. The about 6 whorls are convex around the upper part, then flattened, obtusely angulate at the periphery. The base of the shell is flattened and concave toward the center. The sutures are subcanaliculate. The acute apex is eroded. The following whorls are finely granose in spiral series, of which there are 10 to 12 on each whorl. The body whorl is somewhat deflected anteriorly, bearing about 30 spiral granose ridges, very close and fine upon and below the periphery, coarser above and around the umbilicus, the interstices obliquely striate. The oblique aperture is tetragonal. The outer and basal lips are thickened and plicate within. The oblique columella is inserted nearly in the bottom of the broad umbilical excavation, its edge reflexed and bearing about 10 denticles, twisted near the insertion, terminating below in a simple tooth. The parietal tract is wrinkled. The umbilicus has a plicate border, and in the middle a strong, sometimes crenulate, spiral funicle.

== Distribution ==
This marine species is endemic to Australia and occurs off New South Wales, South Australia, Tasmania, Victoria and Western Australia.
