= Komaitrochus =

Scientific classification
- Kingdom: Animalia
- Phylum: Mollusca
- Class: Gastropoda
- Subclass: Vetigastropoda
- Order: Trochida
- Superfamily: Trochoidea
- Family: Trochidae
- Genus: Komaitrochus; Kuroda & Iw. Taki, 1958

Type species
- Komaitrochus pulcher Kuroda, T. & I. Taki in Kuroda, T., 1958

Genus of gastropods

Komaitrochus is a genus of sea snails, marine gastropod mollusks in the family Trochidae, the top snails.

== Species ==
- Komaitrochus pulcher Kuroda, T. & I. Taki in Kuroda, T., 1958
