= Iwakawatrochus =

Scientific classification
- Kingdom: Animalia
- Phylum: Mollusca
- Class: Gastropoda
- Subclass: Vetigastropoda
- Order: Trochida
- Family: Trochidae
- Genus: Iwakawatrochus; Kuroda & Habe, 1954
- Species: I. urbanus

Binomial name
- Iwakawatrochus urbanus (Gould, 1861)

Synonyms
- Cantharidus (Iwakawatrochus) urbanus (Gould, 1861); Cantharidus urbanus (Gould, 1861); Gibbula eucosmia Pilsbry, 1895; Ziziphinus urbanus Gould, 1861 (original combination)

Genus of molluscs

Iwakawatrochus urbanus is a species of sea snail in the family Trochidae, the top snails. It is the only species in the genus Iwakawatrochus.

== Description ==
The size of the shell varies between 4 mm and 10 mm.

== Distribution ==
This marine species occurs off Korea and the Philippines.
