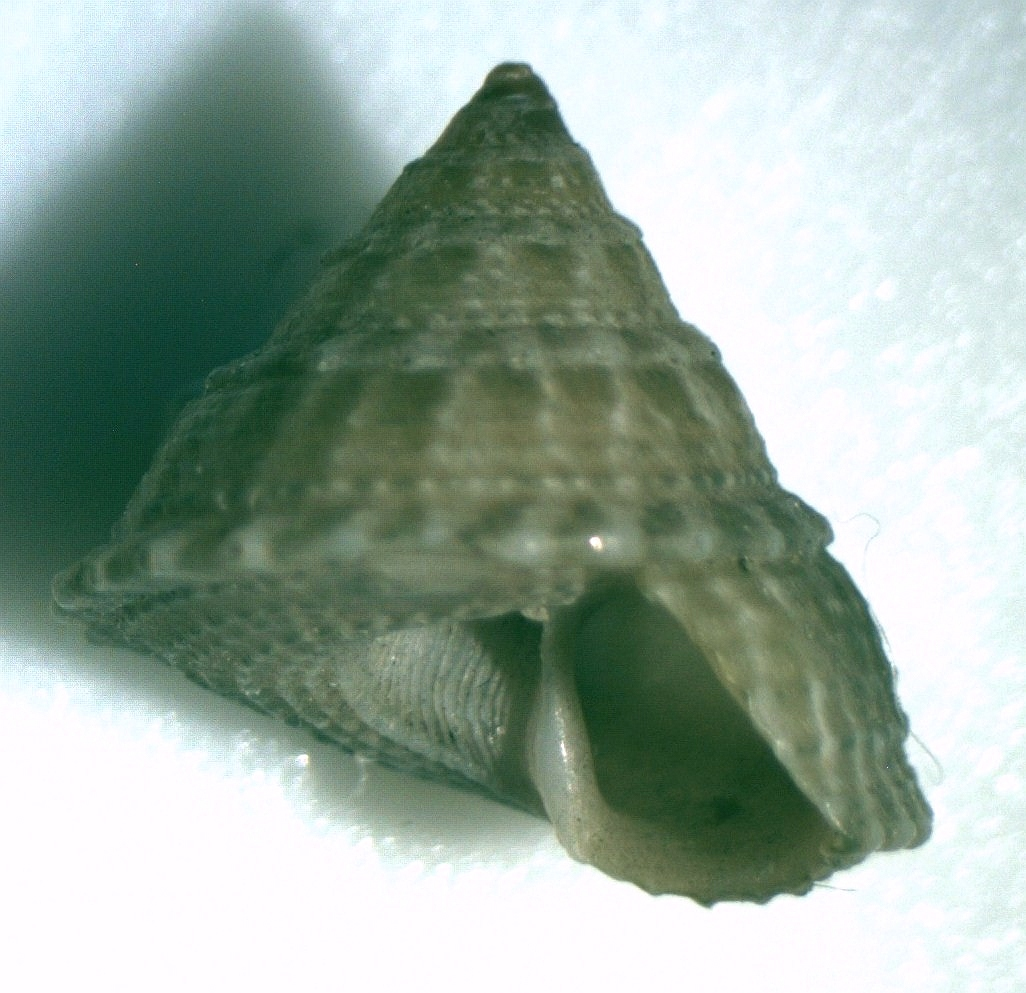
- Agagus agagus shell

Scientific classification
- Kingdom: Animalia
- Phylum: Mollusca
- Class: Gastropoda
- Subclass: Vetigastropoda
- Order: Trochida
- Superfamily: Trochoidea
- Family: Trochidae
- Genus: Agagus; Jousseaume, 1894

Type species
- Agagus agagus Jousseaume, 1894

= Agagus =

Genus of gastropods

Agagus is a genus of sea snails, marine gastropod molluscs in the family Trochidae, the top snails.

== Species ==
Species within the genus Agagus include:

- Agagus agagus Jousseaume, 1894
- Agagus stellamaris Herbert, 1991

Martin Zuschin, Ronald Janssen and Christian Baal (2009) also mention an Agagus n.sp found in the Red Sea, that differs from A. agagus by its smooth base and from A. stellamaris (found in the Indian Ocean) by its higher conical shape.
