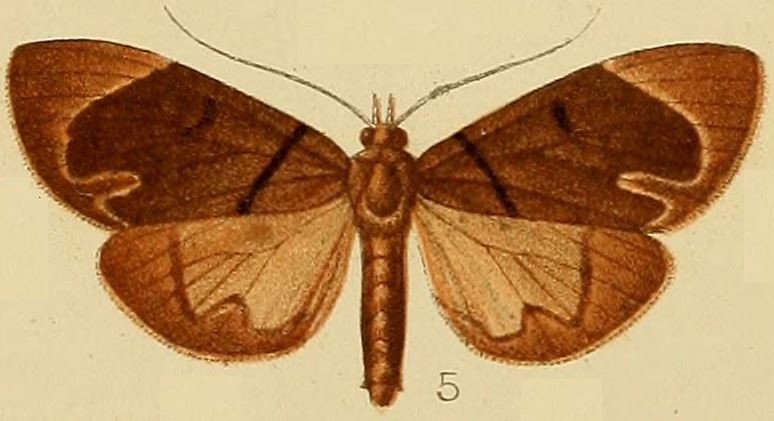

Scientific classification
- Kingdom: Animalia
- Phylum: Arthropoda
- Class: Insecta
- Order: Lepidoptera
- Family: Crambidae
- Subfamily: Pyraustinae
- Genus: Monodonta; Kenrick, 1907
- Species: M. passalis

Binomial name
- Monodonta passalis Kenrick, 1907

= Monodonta passalis =

Genus of moths

Monodonta is a genus of moths of the family Crambidae. It contains only one species, Monodonta passalis, which is described from Mount Kebea in New Guinea. The genus name is a junior homonym of Monodonta Lamarck, 1799 but no replacement name is currently available.
