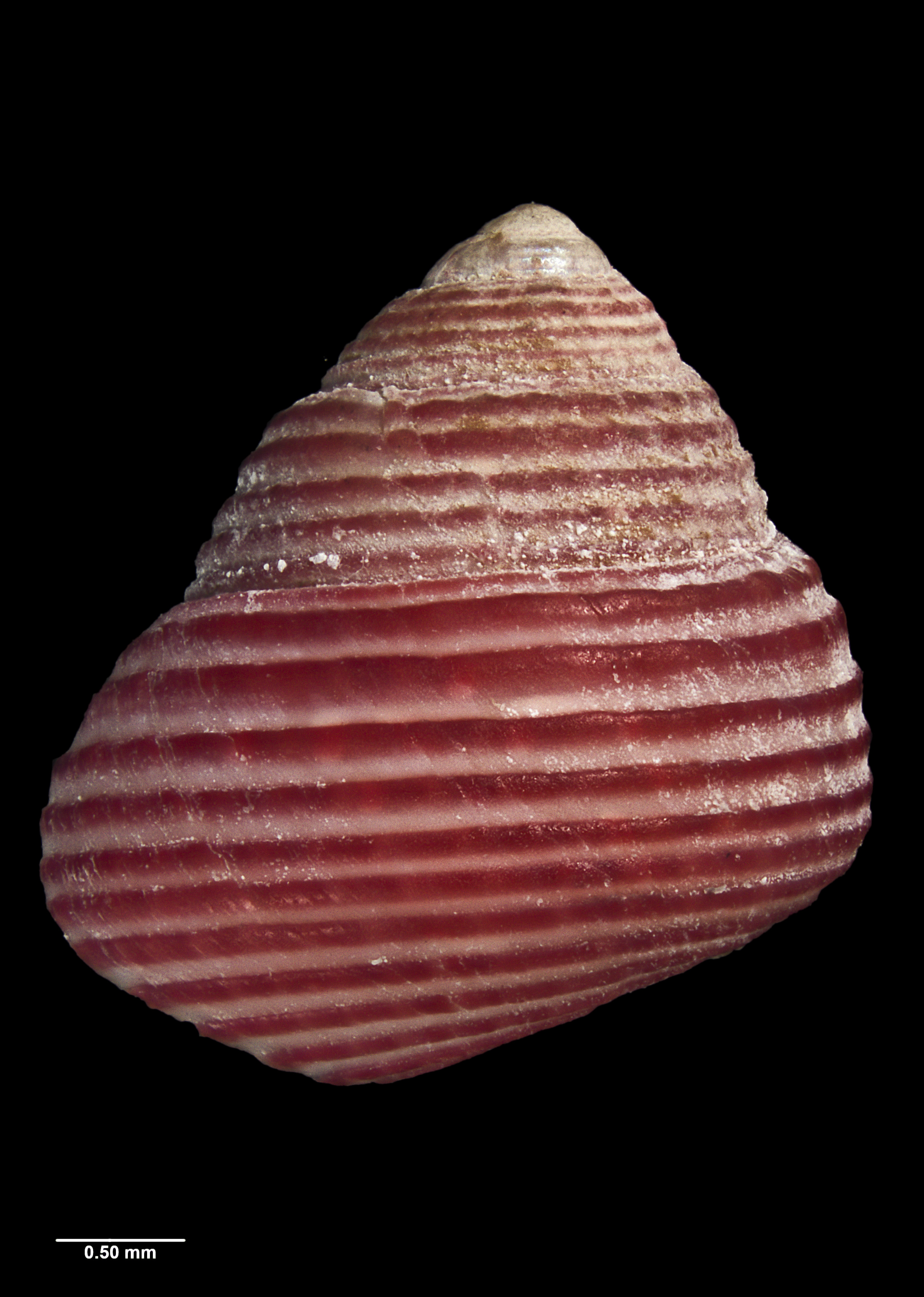

Conservation status
- Not Threatened (NZ TCS)

Scientific classification
- Kingdom: Animalia
- Phylum: Mollusca
- Class: Gastropoda
- Subclass: Vetigastropoda
- Order: Trochida
- Family: Trochidae
- Subfamily: Cantharidinae
- Genus: Roseaplagis
- Species: R. mortenseni

Binomial name
- Roseaplagis mortenseni (Odhner, 1924)

Synonyms
- Cantharidus caelatus mortenseni (Odhner, 1924); Cantharidus mortenseni (Odhner, 1924); Gibbula mortenseni Odhner, 1924 (basionym); Micrelenchus (Plumbelenchus) mortenseni (Odhner, 1924); Micrelenchus archibenthicola Dell, 1956; Micrelenchus caelatus morioria Powell, 1933; Micrelenchus caelatus mortenseni Odhner, 1924; Micrelenchus morioria Powell, 1933; Micrelenchus sanguineus morioria Powell, 1933

= Roseaplagis mortenseni =

Species of gastropod

Roseaplagis mortenseni is a species of sea snail in the family Trochidae, the top snails. The shell grows to a length of 7 mm. This marine species occurs off New Zealand, the Antipodes Islands and the Bounty Islands.
