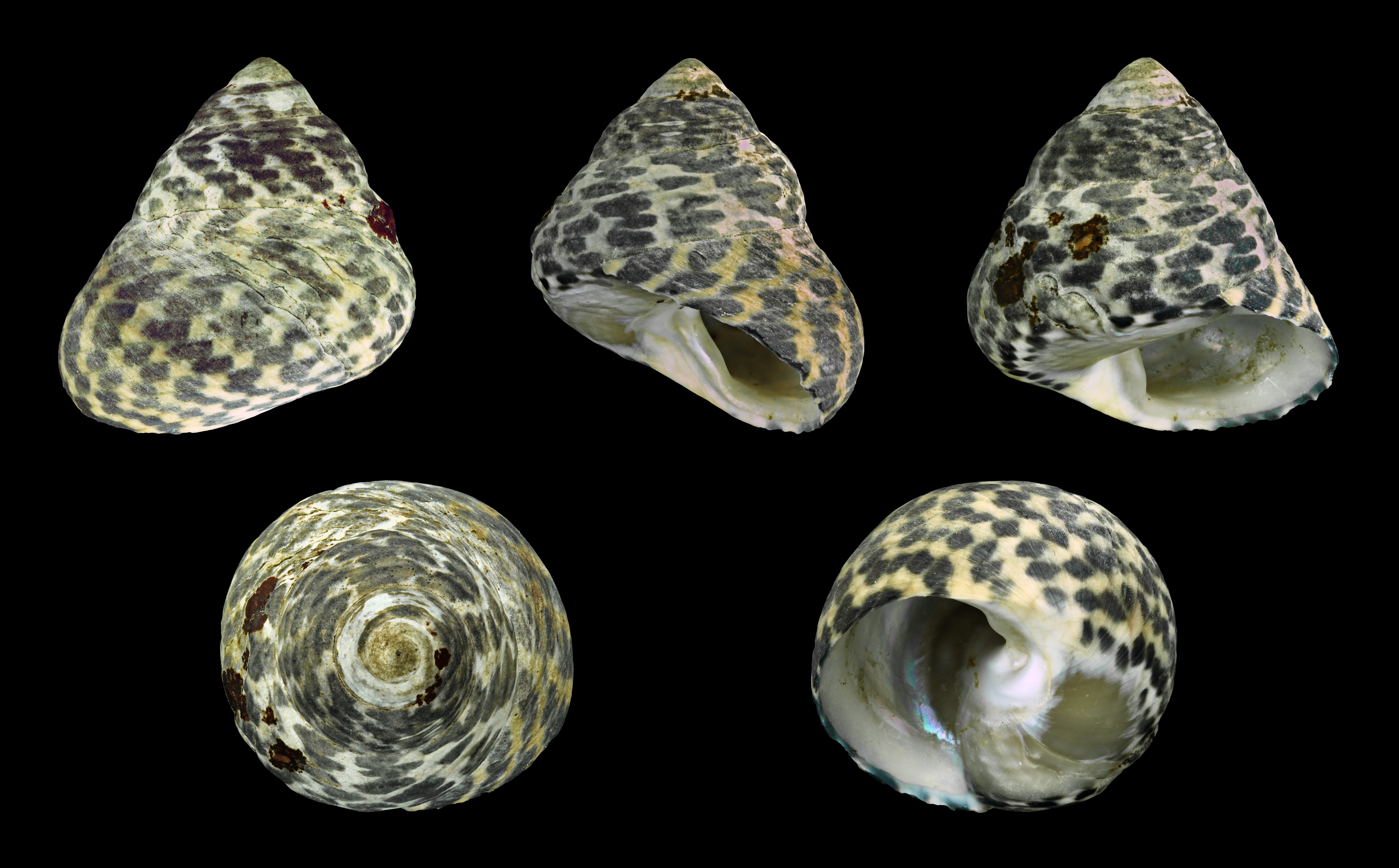
- Five views of a shell of Phorcus turbinatus

Scientific classification
- Kingdom: Animalia
- Phylum: Mollusca
- Class: Gastropoda
- Subclass: Vetigastropoda
- Order: Trochida
- Family: Trochidae
- Subfamily: Cantharidinae
- Genus: Phorcus
- Species: P. turbinatus

Binomial name
- Phorcus turbinatus (Born, 1780)

Synonyms
- Gibbula serpa Nordsieck, 1982; Monodonta fragaroides Lamarck, 1822; Monodonta olivieri Payraudeau, 1826; Monodonta turbinata (Born, 1780); Osilinus turbinatus (Born, 1778); Osilinus turbinatus orientalis Nordsieck, 1974; Trochocochlea turbinata (Born, 1778); Trochocochlea turbinata var. concava Monterosato, 1888; Trochocochlea turbinata var. conspicua Monterosato, 1888; Trochocochlea turbinata var. dilatata Monterosato, 1888; Trochocochlea turbinata var. elevata Monterosato, 1888; Trochocochlea turbinata var. interrupta Pallary, 1912; Trochocochlea turbinata var. lapillus Monterosato, 1888; Trochocochlea turbinata var. maxima Monterosato, 1889; Trochocochlea turbinata var. pinguis Monterosato, 1888; Trochocochlea turbinata var. ponderosa Monterosato, 1888; Trochocochlea turbinata var. zebra Bucquoy, Dautzenberg & Dollfus, 1885; Trochus fragaroides Lamarck, J.B.P.A. de, 1822; Trochus olivieri Payraudeau, B.-C., 1826; Trochus tessulatus Born, 1778; Trochus turbinatus Born, 1778 (original combination); Trochus turbinatus var. elongata Bucquoy, Dautzenberg & Dollfus, 1884; Trochus turbinatus var. globosa Bucquoy, Dautzenberg & Dollfus, 1884; Trochus turbinatus var. major Bucquoy, Dautzenberg & Dollfus, 1884; Trochus zonatus Jeffreys, 1856

= Phorcus turbinatus =

Species of gastropod

Phorcus turbinatus, common name the turbinate monodont, is a species of sea snail, a marine gastropod mollusk in the family Trochidae, the top snails.

== Description ==
The size of the shell varies between 15 mm and 43 mm. The very solid and thick, imperforate shell has a conical shape. It is whitish, tinged with gray, yellowish or greenish, tessellated with numerous spiral series of reddish, purple or chocolate sub-quadrangular blotches. The conoid spire is more or less elevated. The apex is eroded. The about 6 whorls are slightly convex, with impressed spiral lines between the series of blotches, the last generally descending anteriorly. The base of the shell is eroded in front of the aperture. The aperture is very oblique. The thick, smooth outer lip is beveled to an edge. It is pearly and iridescent within. The columella is flattened on the face, bluntly lobed within, pearly, backed by an opaque white layer.

== Distribution ==
This marine species occurs in the following locations:

- Mediterranean Sea
- Greek Exclusive Economic Zone
- Portuguese Exclusive Economic Zone
- Spanish Exclusive Economic Zone (Spain, Canary Islands)

== Bibliography ==
- Lamarck ([J.-B. M.] de), 1815-1822: Histoire naturelle des animaux sans vertèbres; Paris
- Payraudeau B. C., 1826: Catalogue descriptif et méthodique des Annelides et des Mollusques de l'île de Corse; Paris pp. 218 + 8 pl.
- Jeffreys J. G., 1856: On the marine Testacea of the Piedmontese coast; Annals and Magazine of Natural History (2) 17: 155-188
- Bucquoy E., Dautzenberg P. & Dollfus G., 1882-1886: Les mollusques marins du Roussillon. Tome Ier. Gastropodes.; Paris, J.B. Baillière & fils 570 p., 66 pl.
- Monterosato T. A. (di), 1888-1889: Molluschi del Porto di Palermo. Specie e varietà; Bullettino della Società Malacologica Italiana, Pisa 13 (1888[1889?]): 161-180 14 (1889): 75-81
- Pallary P., 1912: Catalogue des mollusques du littoral méditerranéen de l'Egypte; Mémoires de l'Institut d'Egypte 7: 69-207, pl. 15-18
- Nordsieck F., 1974: Il genere Osilinus Philippi, 1847 nei mari europei; La Conchiglia 9-10 (67-68): 21-23
- Nordsieck F., 1982: Die europäischen Meeres-Gehäuseschnecken. 2. Auflage.; Gustav Fischer, Stuttgart 539 pp., 38 pl
