= Roseaplagis artizona =

Scientific classification
- Kingdom: Animalia
- Phylum: Mollusca
- Class: Gastropoda
- Subclass: Vetigastropoda
- Order: Trochida
- Family: Trochidae
- Subfamily: Cantharidinae
- Genus: Roseaplagis
- Species: R. artizona

Binomial name
- Roseaplagis artizona (A. Adams, 1853)

Synonyms
- Cantharidus artizona A. Adams, 1853 (original combination); Cantharidus sanguineus bakeri (C. A. Fleming, 1948); Cantharidus caelatus elongatus (Suter, 1897); Cantharidus sanguineus bakeri Fleming, 1948; Cantharidus sanguineus var. elongata Suter, 1897; Gibbula micans Suter, 1897; Micrelenchus (Plumbelenchus) artizona (A. Adams, 1853); Micrelenchus artizona (A. Adams, 1853); Micrelenchus sanguineus bakeri C. A. Fleming, 1948

Species of gastropod

Roseaplagis artizona is a species of sea snail in the family Trochidae, the top snails.

== Description ==
The height of the shell attains 3.5 mm, its diameter 4 mm. The very small shell is subperforate or imperforate. It has a conical shape. It is slightly iridescent and shining. The sculpture consists of fine spiral lirae, about 15 on the penultimate whorl. The growth lines are inconspicuous. It has a light yellow colour with radiate oblique broad streaks of dark brown. The intervals are filled with a few light brown dots. The base of the shell is tessellated with yellowish and brown. The epidermis is very thin, the pearly inner layer shining partly through it.

The spire is conic with its height greater than that of the aperture. The sides are very slightly convex. The protoconch is small, acute, and consists of two convex, light-brown, and finely spirally striate whorls. The six whorls are flatly convex. The body whorl is keeled at the periphery. The base of the shell is convex. The sutures are very little impressed. The slightly oblique aperture is subquadrangular. The interior is silvery and finely lirate. The outer and basal lip are sharp, angled where they meet, margined with a white bead. The columella is subvertical, slightly arched, with a slight swelling in the middle. The umbilicus is partly or completely covered by the columella expansion. The white umbilical tract is slightly impressed.

== Distribution ==
This marine species is endemic to New Zealand.
