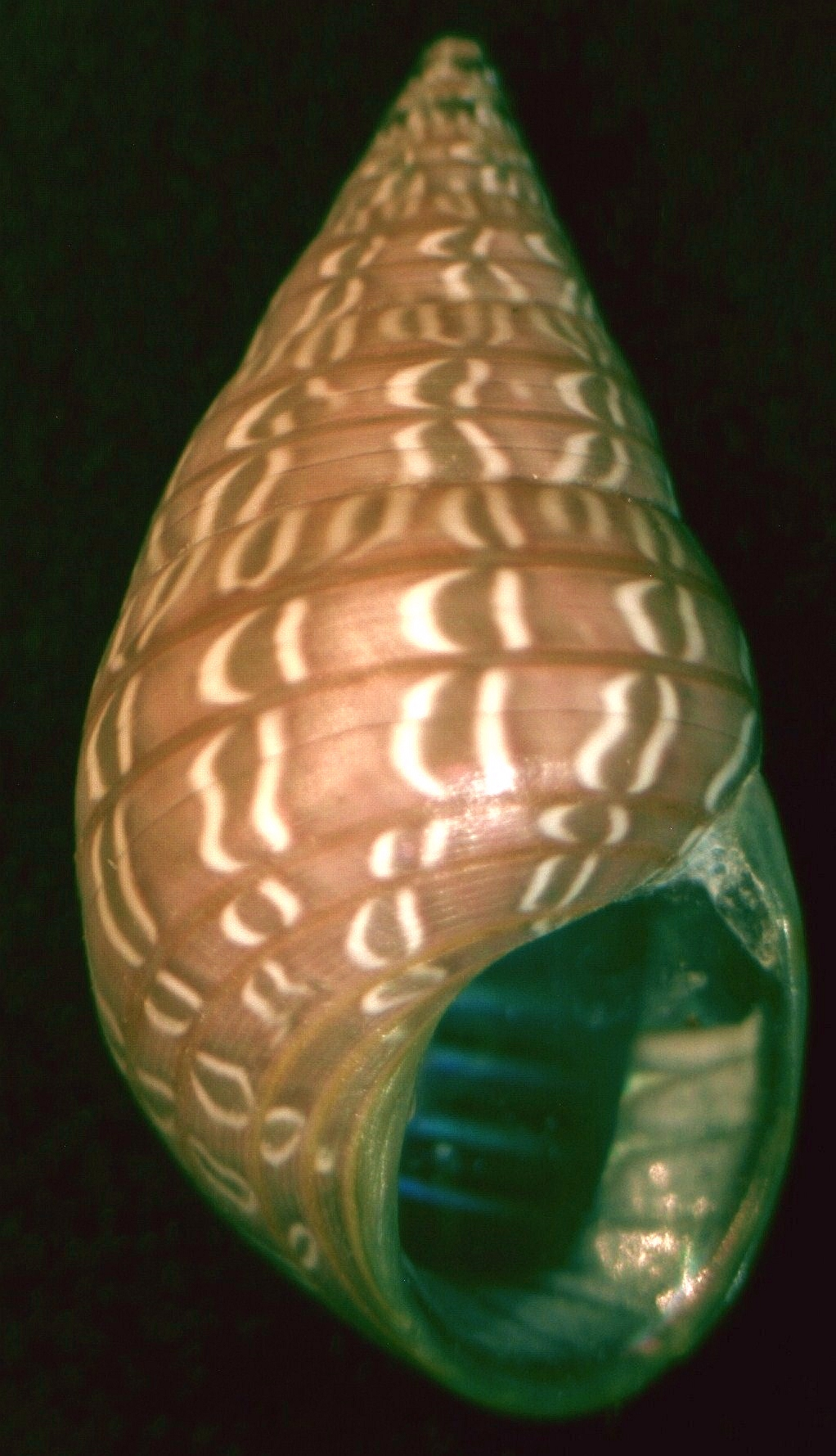
- Phasianotrochus bellulus

Scientific classification
- Kingdom: Animalia
- Phylum: Mollusca
- Class: Gastropoda
- Subclass: Vetigastropoda
- Order: Trochida
- Superfamily: Trochoidea
- Family: Trochidae
- Subfamily: Cantharidinae; Gray, 1857

Synonyms
- Gibbulinae Stoliczka, 1868; Pagodatrochidae Bandel, 2010 ·

= Cantharidinae =

Subfamily of gastropods

The Cantharidinae are a taxonomic subfamily of very small to large sea snails, marine gastropod molluscs in the family Trochidae, common name top snails.

Originally it was ranked as tribe of the Trochinae, according to the taxonomy of the Gastropoda by Bouchet & Rocroi from 2005, but was elevated to the rank of subfamily following Williams et al.

== General characteristics ==
(Originally described in Latin) The shell is subturreted, smooth, and polished; the aperture is sub-ovate and rather elongate; the whorls are laterally compressed; the pearly layer (nacreous coat) is greenish; and the axis is imperforate.

== Genera ==
- Agagus Jousseaume, 1894
- † Amonilea Cossmann, 1920
- † Anceps Kolesnikov, 1939
- Calthalotia Iredale, 1929
- Cantharidoscops Galkin, 1955
- Cantharidus Montfort, 1810
- Clelandella Winckworth, 1932
- Gibbula Risso, 1826
- † Gibbuliculus Harzhauser, 2021
- Iwakawatrochus Kuroda & Habe, 1954
- Jujubinus Monterosato, 1884
- Kanekotrochus Habe, 1958
- † Kishinewia Kolesnikov, 1935
- Komaitrochus Kuroda & Iw. Taki, 1958
- † Lesperonia Tournouër, 1874
- Micrelenchus Finlay, 1926
- Nanula Thiele, 1924
- Odontotrochus P. Fischer, 1880
- Oxystele Philippi, 1847
- Pagodatrochus Herbert, 1989
- † Paroxystele O. Schultz, 1970
- Phasianotrochus P. Fischer, 1885
- † Phorculus Cossmann, 1888
- Phorcus Risso, 1826
- Pictodiloma Habe, 1946
- Priotrochus P. Fischer, 1879
- Prothalotia Thiele, 1930
- Pseudotalopia Habe, 1961
- † Rollandiana Kolesnikov, 1939
- Roseaplagis K. M. Donald & Spencer, 2016
- † Sarmatigibbula Sladkovskaya, 2017
- † Sinzowia Kolesnikov, 1935 †
- Steromphala Gray, 1847
- Thalotia Gray, 1847
- † Timisia Jekelius, 1944
- Tosatrochus MacNeil, 1961

Genera brought into synonymy

- Aphanotrochus Martens, 1880: synonym of Priotrochus P. Fischer, 1879
- Elenchus Swainson, 1840: synonym of Cantharidus Montfort, 1810
- Korenia Friele, 1877: synonym of Gibbula Risso, 1826
- Limax Martyn, 1784: synonym of Cantharidus Montfort, 1810
- Mawhero Marshall, 1998 synonym of Cantharidus Montfort, 1810
- Osilinus Philippi, 1847: synonym of Phorcus Risso, 1826
- Plumbelenchus Finlay, 1926: synonym of Cantharidus Montfort, 1810
- Scrobiculinus Monterosato, 1889: synonym of Gibbula Risso, 1826
- Steromphala Gray, 1847: synonym of Gibbula Risso, 1826
- Strigosella Sacco, 1896: synonym of Scrobiculinus Monterosato, 1889
- Trochinella Iredale, 1937: synonym of Calliotrochus P. Fischer, 1879
- Trochocochlea Mörch, 1852: synonym of Phorcus Risso, 1826
