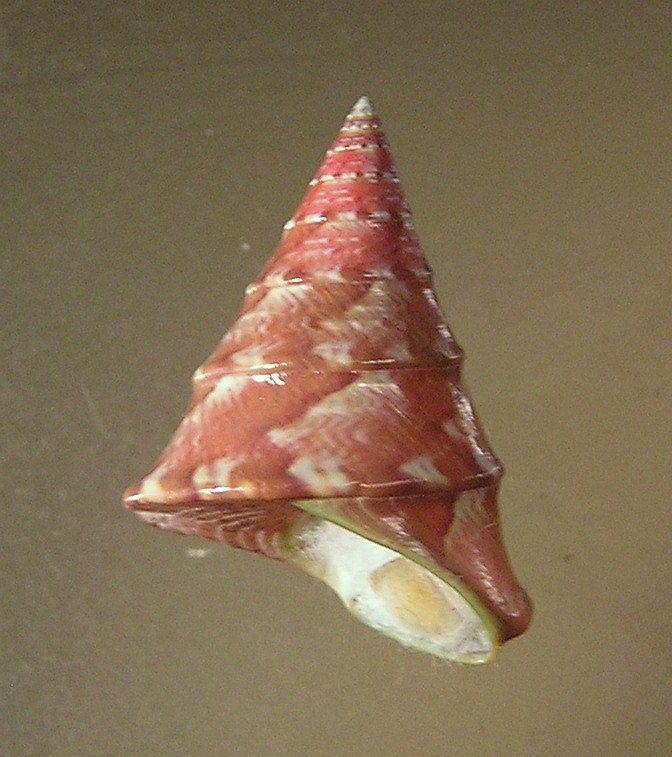
- Apertural view of a shell of Thalotia chlorostoma

Scientific classification
- Kingdom: Animalia
- Phylum: Mollusca
- Class: Gastropoda
- Subclass: Vetigastropoda
- Order: Trochida
- Superfamily: Trochoidea
- Family: Trochidae
- Genus: Thalotia; Gray, 1847

Type species
- Trochus pictus Wood, 1828

Synonyms
- Thalotia (Thalotia) Gray, 1840

= Thalotia =

Genus of gastropods

Thalotia is a genus of sea snails, marine gastropod mollusks in the family Trochidae, the top snails.

== Description ==
The thick, solid shell is imperforate, elevated-conical, granulated or spirally ribbed. The periphery is rounded or obtusely angular. The small aperture is ovate. The outer lip is thick and crenulated within. The columella is toothed at the base and subtruncated.

== Species ==
Species within the genus Thalotia include:

- Thalotia beluchistana Melvill, J.C., 1897
- Thalotia conica (Gray, 1827)
- Thalotia khlimax Vilvens, 2012
- Thalotia polysarchosa Vilvens, 2012
- Thalotia tiaraeides Vilvens, 2012

The following species were brought into synonymy:

- Thalotia aspera Kuroda & Habe, 1952: synonym of Tosatrochus attenuatus (Jonas, 1844)
- Thalotia attenuata (Jonas, 1845): synonym of Tosatrochus attenuatus (Jonas, 1844)
- Thalotia chlorostoma (Menke, 1843): synonym of Odontotrochus chlorostomus (Menke, 1843)
- Thalotia comtessei Iredale, 1931: synonym of Calthalotia fragum (Philippi, 1848)
- Thalotia crenellifera Adams, 1853: synonym of Cantharidus crenelliferus (A. Adams, 1853)
- Thalotia dubia Tenison-Woods, J.E., 1878: synonym of Thalotia conica (Gray, 1827)
- Thalotia elongata Sowerby, G.B. I, 1818: synonym of Tosatrochus attenuatus (Jonas, 1844)
- Thalotia kotschyi (Philippi, 1849): synonym of Osilinus kotschyi (Philippi, 1849); synonym of Priotrochus kotschyi (Philippi, 1849)
- Thalotia maculata Brazier, 1877: synonym of Turcica maculata (Brazier, 1877) (original combination)
- Thalotia maldivensis Smith, 1903: synonym of Jujubinus maldivensis (E. A. Smith, 1903) (original combination)
- Thalotia mariae Tenison-Woods, 1877: synonym of Cantharidus pulcherrimus W. Wood, 1828
- Thalotia mundula A. Adams & Angas, 1864: synonym of Prothalotia strigata (Adams, 1853)
- Thalotia neglecta Tate, 1893: synonym of Odontotrochus chlorostomus (Menke, K.T., 1843)
- Thalotia ocellata (A. Adams, 1861): synonym of Alcyna ocellata A. Adams, 1860
- Thalotia rariguttata (Sowerby, G.B. III, 1916): synonym of Cantharidus rariguttatus G. B. Sowerby III, 1916
- Thalotia picta Angas, 1865: synonym of Prothalotia lesueuri (P. Fischer, 1880)
- Thalotia pictus Wood, 1828: synonym of Thalotia conica (Gray, 1827)
- Thalotia strigata Adams, 1853: synonym of Prothalotia strigata (Adams, 1853)
- Thalotia subangulata (Pease, 1861): synonym of Alcyna subangulata Pease, 1861
- Thalotia suturalis A. Adams, 1853: synonym of Prothalotia suturalis (A. Adams, 1853)
- Thalotia torresi E.A. Smith, 1884: synonym of Calthalotia arruensis (Watson, 1880)
- Thalotia woodsiana Angas, 1872: synonym of Thalotia conica (Gray, 1827)
- Thalotia yokohamaensis Donald, K.M., 1878: synonym of Kanekotrochus infuscatus Gould, A.A., 1861
- Thalotia zebrides A. Adams, 1851: synonym of Prothalotia pyrgos Philippi, 1849
