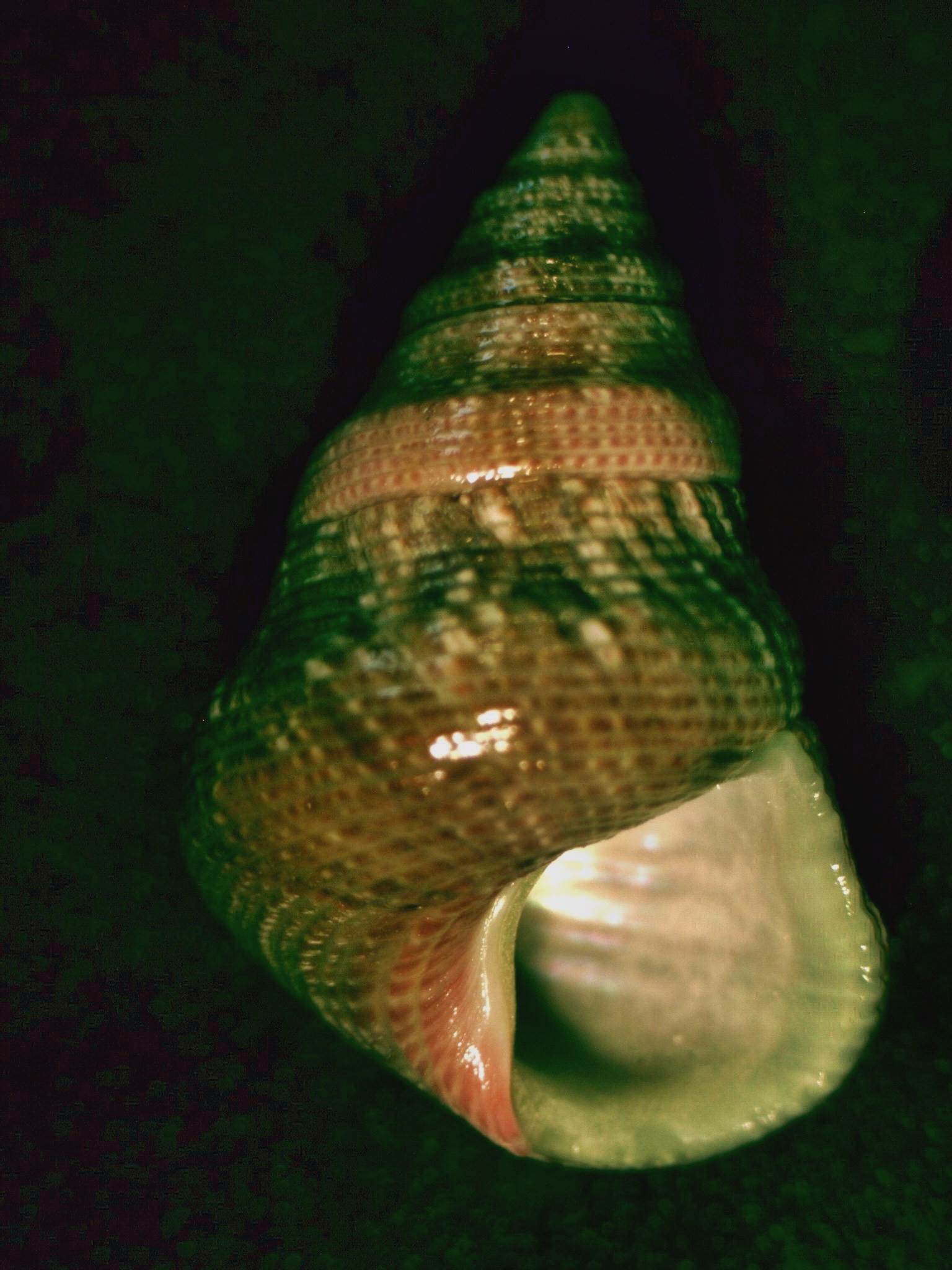
- Prothalotia ramburi

Scientific classification
- Kingdom: Animalia
- Phylum: Mollusca
- Class: Gastropoda
- Subclass: Vetigastropoda
- Order: Trochida
- Superfamily: Trochoidea
- Family: Trochidae
- Subfamily: Cantharidinae
- Genus: Prothalotia; Thiele, 1930

Type species
- Trochus flindersi P. Fischer, 1878

Synonyms
- Cantharidus (Prothalotia) Thiele, 1930 (original rank)

= Prothalotia =

Genus of gastropods

Prothalotia is a genus of sea snails, marine gastropod mollusks in the subfamily Cantharidinae of the family Trochidae, the top snails.

== Distribution ==
The species in this genus occurs off Japan and Australia.

== Species ==
Species within the genus Prothalotia include:

- Prothalotia chlorites (Philippi, 1846)
- Prothalotia flindersi (Fischer, 1878)
- Prothalotia lehmanni (Menke, 1843)
- Prothalotia lesueuri Fischer, 1880
- Prothalotia porteri (Iredale, 1940)
- Prothalotia pulcherrima (W. Wood, 1828)
- Prothalotia ramburi (Crosse, 1864)
- Prothalotia suturalis (Adams, 1853)

The Indo-Pacific Molluscan Database also includes the following species with names in current use :

- Prothalotia pyrgos Philippi, 1849
- Prothalotia serpentina (Quoy in Kiener, 1859)

Species brought into synonymy

- Prothalotia baudini (Fischer, 1878): synonym of Calthalotia baudini (P. Fischer, 1878)
- Prothalotia boninensis Okutani, 2001: synonym of Kanekotrochus boninensis (Okutani, 2001)
- Prothalotia comtessi Iredale, 1931: synonym of Calthalotia comtessi (Iredale, 1931)
- Prothalotia nitens Kiener, L.C., 1859: synonym of Prothalotia lehmanni (Menke, 1843)
- Prothalotia pulcherrimus (Wood, 1828): synonym of Cantharidus pulcherrimus (Wood, 1828)
- Prothalotia strigata (Adams, 1853): synonym of Calthalotia strigata (A. Adams, 1853)
- Prothalotia sulcosa Adams, A., 1851: synonym of Prothalotia lehmanni (Menke, 1843)
