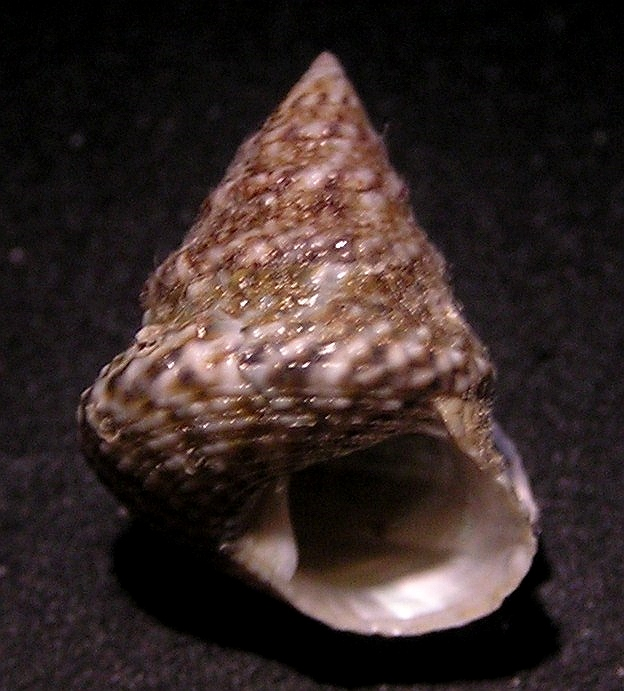
- A shell of Calthalotia arruensis

Scientific classification
- Kingdom: Animalia
- Phylum: Mollusca
- Class: Gastropoda
- Subclass: Vetigastropoda
- Order: Trochida
- Superfamily: Trochoidea
- Family: Trochidae
- Genus: Calthalotia; Iredale, 1929

Type species
- Calliostoma arruense Watson, 1880

= Calthalotia =

Genus of gastropods

Calthalotia is an Australian genus of sea snails, marine gastropod molluscs in the family Trochidae, the top shells.

== Species ==
Species with names in current use within the genus Calthalotia include:

- Calthalotia arruensis (Watson, 1880)
- Calthalotia baudini (Fischer, 1878)
- Calthalotia fragum (Philippi, 1848)
- Calthalotia modesta (Thiele, 1930)
- Calthalotia mundula (Adams & Angas, 1864)
- Calthalotia strigata (Adams, 1853)

Species brought into synonymy

- Calthalotia comtessi (Iredale, 1931): synonym of Calthalotia fragum (Philippi, 1848)
- Calthalotia indistincta (Wood, 1828): synonym of Calthalotia comtessi (Iredale, 193)1 - C. indistincta has priority over C. comtessi, according to Jansen (1993).
- Calthalotia marginata (Tenison-Woods, J.E., 1880): synonym of Calthalotia arruensis (Watson, 1880)
- Calthalotia nitidissima Ludbrook, N.H. 1941: synonym of Calthalotia arruensis (Watson, 1880)
- Calthalotia porteri Iredale, 1940: synonym of Prothalotia porteri (Iredale, 1940)
