= A. exigua =

A. exigua may refer to:

- Acaena exigua, a rose endemic to Hawaii
- Acrolophus exigua, a South American moth
- Acrotona exigua, a rove beetle
- Aglaia exigua, a New Guinean mahogany
- Agrostis exigua, a North American bunchgrass
- Agyneta exigua, an African spider
- Alcadia exigua, a land snail
- Alcyna exigua, a sea snail
- Aleuria exigua, a cup fungus
- Anaxipha exigua, a sword-tail cricket
- Ancilla exigua, a sea snail
- Andrena exigua, a nonparasitic bee
- Antoniettella exigua, a colonial invertebrate
- Anxietas exigua, a sea snail
- Asterias exigua, a starfish native to the northeastern Atlantic Ocean and the Mediterranean Sea
- Attalea exigua, a New World palm
