= Calthalotia modesta =

Scientific classification
- Kingdom: Animalia
- Phylum: Mollusca
- Class: Gastropoda
- Subclass: Vetigastropoda
- Order: Trochida
- Superfamily: Trochoidea
- Family: Trochidae
- Genus: Calthalotia
- Species: C. modesta

Binomial name
- Calthalotia modesta (Thiele, 1930)

Synonyms
- Calliostoma modestum Thiele, J. 1930

Species of gastropod

Calthalotia modesta is a species of sea snail, a marine gastropod mollusk in the family Trochidae, the top snails.

== Distribution ==
This marine species is endemic to Australia and occurs off Western Australia.
