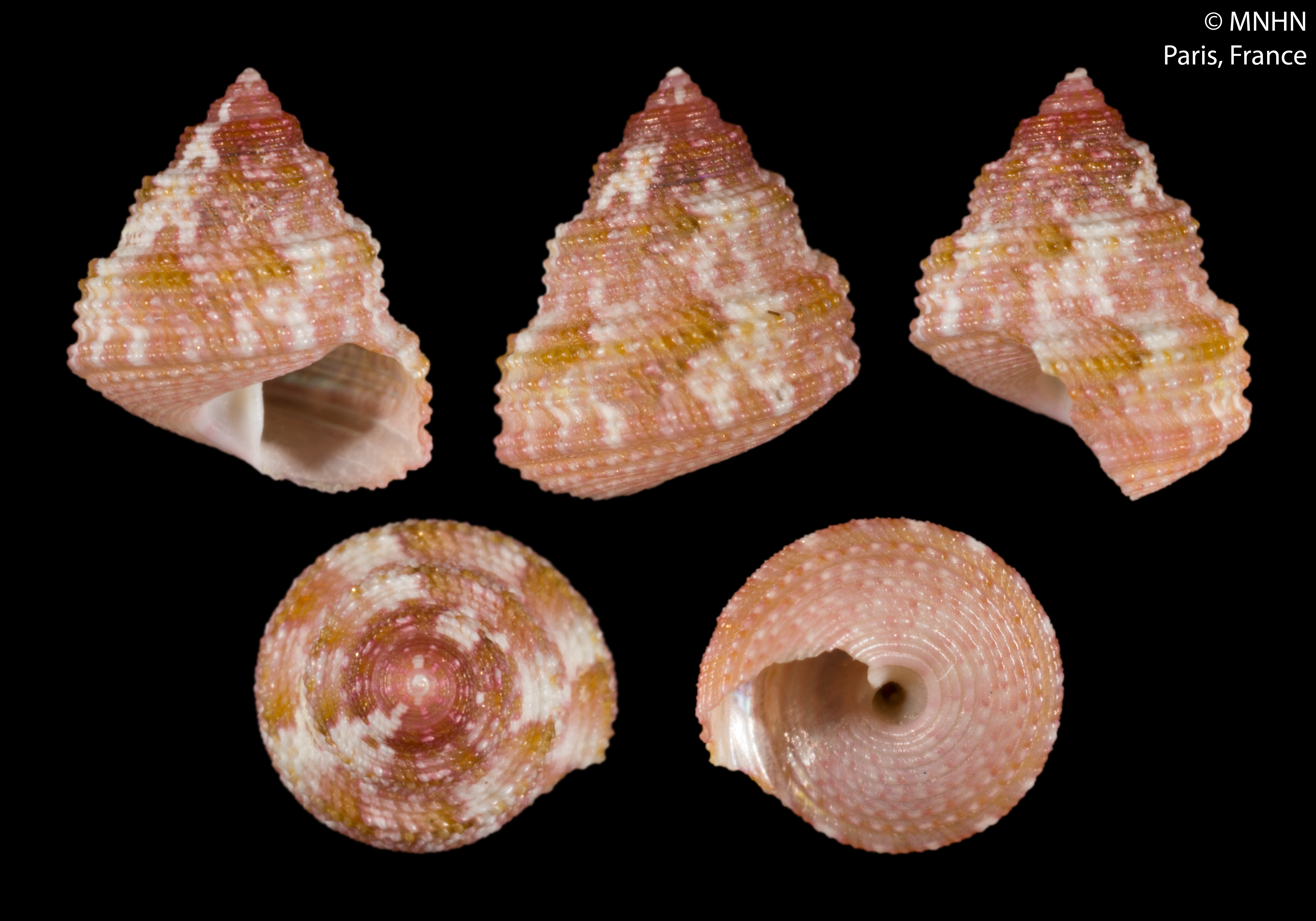
- Shell of Thalotia khlimax (holotype at MNHN, Paris)

Scientific classification
- Kingdom: Animalia
- Phylum: Mollusca
- Class: Gastropoda
- Subclass: Vetigastropoda
- Order: Trochida
- Superfamily: Trochoidea
- Family: Trochidae
- Genus: Thalotia
- Species: T. khlimax

Binomial name
- Thalotia khlimax Vilvens, 2012

= Thalotia khlimax =

Species of gastropod

Thalotia khlimax is a species of sea snail, a marine gastropod mollusk in the family Trochidae, the top snails.

== Description ==
The shell has a spiralling shape with the aperture typically situated at the bottom. The height of an adult shell attains 6 mm.

== Distribution ==
This marine species occurs off the Austral Islands and French Polynesia.
