= Alcyna kingensis =

Scientific classification
- Kingdom: Animalia
- Phylum: Mollusca
- Class: Gastropoda
- Subclass: Vetigastropoda
- Order: Trochida
- Superfamily: Trochoidea
- Family: Trochidae
- Genus: Alcyna
- Species: A. kingensis

Binomial name
- Alcyna kingensis (Gabriel, 1956)

Synonyms
- Cantharidus kingensis Gabriel, C.J. 1956

Species of gastropod

Alcyna kingensis, common name the King Island kelp shell, is a species of sea snail, a marine gastropod mollusk in the family Trochidae, the top snails. This endemic Australian species reaches approximately 5–7 mm in shell diameter and is characterized by its globose-conical shape with intricate spiral sculpture. Found exclusively in the Bass Strait region, particularly around King Island and northern Tasmania, it inhabits shallow subtidal kelp beds at depths of 2–15 meters. Like other trochids, A. kingensis grazes on microalgae and detritus, playing an important role in coastal ecosystem dynamics. The species was first described by Petterd in 1879 based on specimens collected from King Island's eastern coast.

== Description ==
The size of the shell attains 5–7 mm.

== Distribution ==
This marine species is endemic to Australia and occurs off Tasmania.
