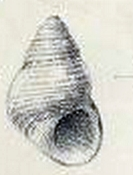
- Drawing of a shell of Alcyna lifuensis

Scientific classification
- Kingdom: Animalia
- Phylum: Mollusca
- Class: Gastropoda
- Subclass: Vetigastropoda
- Order: Trochida
- Superfamily: Trochoidea
- Family: Trochidae
- Genus: Alcyna; A. Adams, 1860

Type species
- Alcyna ocellata Adams, A., 1860

Synonyms
- Euchelus (Nevillia) H. Adams, 1868; Nevillia H. Adams, 1868

= Alcyna =

Genus of gastropods

Alcyna is a genus of sea snails, marine gastropod mollusks in the family Trochidae, the top snails.

This genus was previously included in the family Phasianellidae.

== Description ==
The minute shell is similar in form to Phasianella. The aperture is ovate. The columella has a heavy callus, bearing near the base a strong curved denticle projecting into the aperture. The outer lip is simple.

The imperforate shell is acutely ovate. The convex whorls are spirally lirate and longitudinally striate. The columella is callous, and toothed below. The outer lip is smooth or toothed within, and varicose exteriorly.

== Species ==
Species within the genus Alcyna include:

- Alcyna acia Cotton, 1948
- Alcyna australis Hedley, 1907
- Alcyna exigua (Gould, A.A., 1861)
- Alcyna kingensis (Gabriel, 1956)
- Alcyna lifuensis Melvill & Standen, 1896
- Alcyna lucida (H. Adams, 1868)
- Alcyna ocellata A. Adams, 1860
- Alcyna subangulata Pease, 1861

The following species were brought into synonymy:

- Alcyna flammulata Pilsbry, 1917: synonym of Alcyna subangulata Pease, 1861
- Alcyna kapiolaniae Pilsbry, 1917: synonym of Alcyna ocellata A. Adams, 1860
- Alcyna kuhnsi Pilsbry, 1917: synonym of Alcyna ocellata A. Adams, 1860
- Alcyna lepida A. Adams, 1860: synonym of Alcyna ocellata A. Adams, 1860
- Alcyna lineata Pease, 1869: synonym of Alcyna subangulata Pease, 1861
- Alcyna rubra Pease, 1861: synonym of Alcyna ocellata A. Adams, 1860
- Alcyna striata Pease, 1869: synonym of Alcyna subangulata Pease, 1861
- Alcyna subangulata flammulata Pilsbry, 1917: synonym of Alcyna subangulata Pease, 1861
- Alcyna subangulata virgata Pilsbry, 1917: synonym of Alcyna subangulata Pease, 1861
- Alcyna virgata Pilsbry, 1917: synonym of Alcyna subangulata Pease, 1861
