= Calthalotia mundula =

Scientific classification
- Kingdom: Animalia
- Phylum: Mollusca
- Class: Gastropoda
- Subclass: Vetigastropoda
- Order: Trochida
- Superfamily: Trochoidea
- Family: Trochidae
- Genus: Calthalotia
- Species: C. mundula

Binomial name
- Calthalotia mundula (A. Adams & Angas, 1864)

Synonyms
- Cantharidus mundula (A. Adams & Angas, 1864); Thalotia mundula A. Adams & Angas, 1864

Species of gastropod

Calthalotia mundula is a species of sea snail, a marine gastropod mollusk in the family Trochidae, the top snails.

== Description ==
The size of the shell attains 20 mm. The subperforate shell has an elevated-conical shape. It is whitish, obsoletely painted with longitudinal purplish flammules. The plane whorls are concave in the middle. At the sutures they show a prominent rounded ridge, transversely lirate. The lirae are equal and subgranulose. The base of the shell is concentrically lirate, with radiating striae in the interstices. The aperture is subquadrate. The arcuate lip ends anteriorly in an obtuse tooth. The lip is obsoletely sulcate within.

== Distribution ==
This marine species is endemic to Australia and occurs off Western Australia.
