= Alcyna acia =

Scientific classification
- Kingdom: Animalia
- Phylum: Mollusca
- Class: Gastropoda
- Subclass: Vetigastropoda
- Order: Trochida
- Superfamily: Trochoidea
- Family: Trochidae
- Genus: Alcyna
- Species: A. acia

Binomial name
- Alcyna acia Cotton, 1948

Species of gastropod

Alcyna acia is a species of small sea snail, a marine gastropod mollusk or micromollusk in the family Trochidae, the top snails.

== Description ==
The size of the shell attains 3 mm.

== Distribution ==
This marine species is endemic to Australia and occurs off Southern Australia and West Australia.

== Environmental Conditions ==
This marine species tends to live in places with a sea surface temperature of 15–25 °C (59–77 °F).
