= Thalotia beluchistana =

Scientific classification
- Kingdom: Animalia
- Phylum: Mollusca
- Class: Gastropoda
- Subclass: Vetigastropoda
- Order: Trochida
- Superfamily: Trochoidea
- Family: Trochidae
- Genus: Thalotia
- Species: T. beluchistana

Binomial name
- Thalotia beluchistana Melvill, J.C., 1897

Species of gastropod

Thalotia beluchistana is a species of sea snail, a marine gastropod mollusk in the family Trochidae, the top snails.

In 1901, Melvill expressed the opinion that some malacologists might consider this species to belong in the genus Calliostoma.

== Description ==
The length of the shell attains 10 mm, its diameter 9 mm.

(Original description in Latin) The shell is pyramidal in shape, narrowly umbilicated, and relatively solid in structure. It consists of nine whorls, the first three of which are apical, slightly ventricose, finely striated, and tinged with a pinkish-red hue. The remaining whorls are encircled at the sutures—and the body whorl at the periphery—by a raised, thread-like spiral carina of a deep reddish-pink color. These whorls are further adorned with very oblique longitudinal striae.

The general surface of the whorls is marked by regular transverse ridges and very oblique longitudinal striae, presenting an ash-gray color. At the periphery of the body whorl, the shell is sharply carinated. The base is elegant and flattened, featuring ten concentric, thread-like ridges that are regularly marked with minute red dots. The aperture is square in shape, and the peristome is thin, with the columellar margin being slightly reflected so as to partially cover the umbilicus.

== Distribution ==
This marine species occurs in the Gulf of Oman, the Persian Gulf and in the Arabian Sea.
