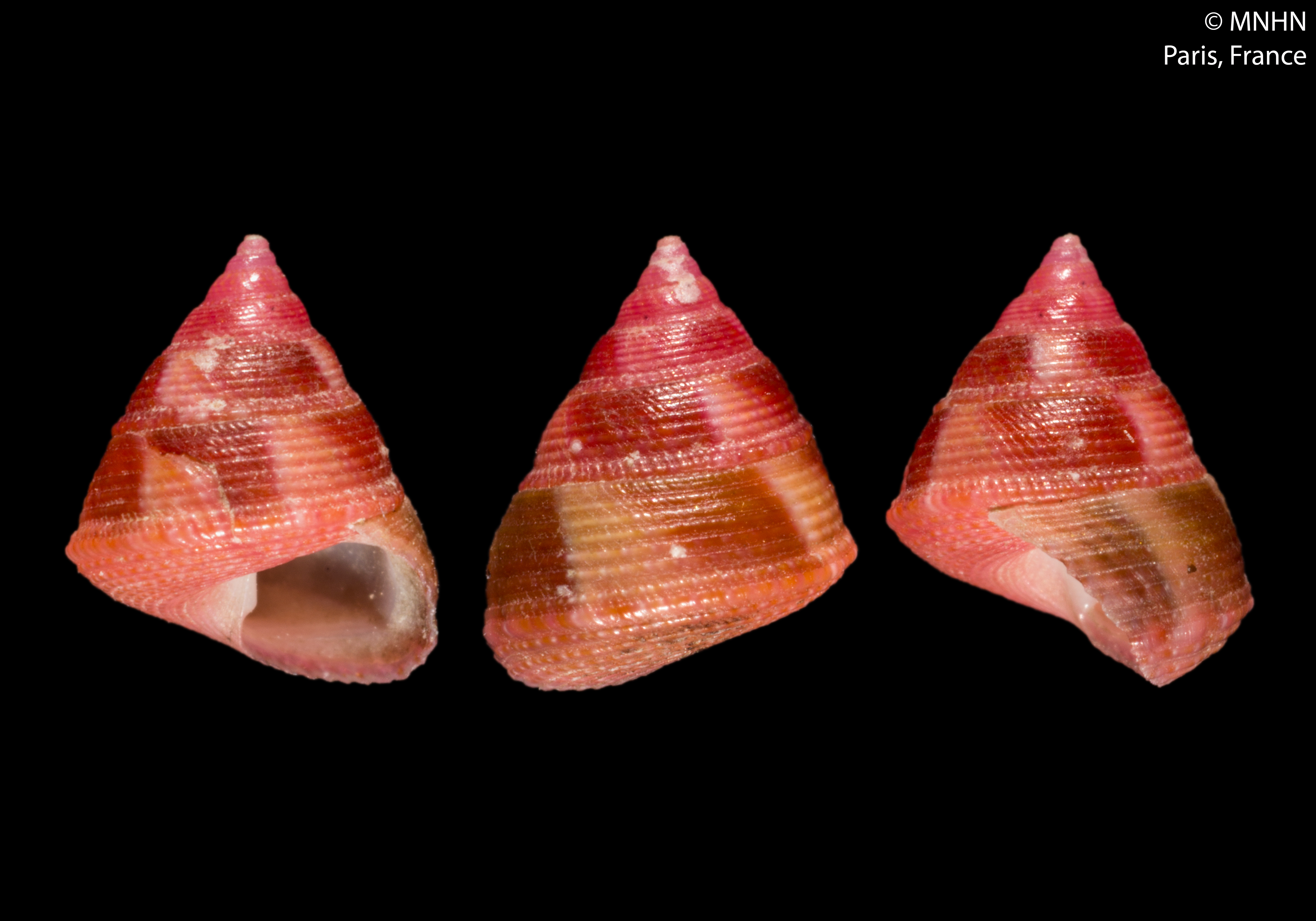
- Shell of Thalotia polysarchosa (holotype at MNHN, Paris)

Scientific classification
- Kingdom: Animalia
- Phylum: Mollusca
- Class: Gastropoda
- Subclass: Vetigastropoda
- Order: Trochida
- Superfamily: Trochoidea
- Family: Trochidae
- Genus: Thalotia
- Species: T. polysarchosa

Binomial name
- Thalotia polysarchosa Vilvens, 2012

= Thalotia polysarchosa =

Species of gastropod

Thalotia polysarchosa is a species of sea snail, a marine gastropod mollusc in the family Trochidae, the top snails.

== Description ==
The height of an adult shell attains 4.5 mm.

== Distribution ==
This marine species occurs off the Austral Islands and French Polynesia.
