= Kanekotrochus =

Scientific classification
- Kingdom: Animalia
- Phylum: Mollusca
- Class: Gastropoda
- Subclass: Vetigastropoda
- Order: Trochida
- Family: Trochidae
- Genus: Kanekotrochus; Habe, 1958

Type species
- Trochus yokohamensis Bock, 1878

Genus of gastropods

Kanekotrochus is a genus of sea snails, marine gastropod mollusks in the family Trochidae, the top snails.

== Species ==
Species within the genus Kanekotrochus include:

- Kanekotrochus boninensis (Okutani, 2001)
- Kanekotrochus infuscatus Gould, A.A., 1861
- Kanekotrochus vietnamensis Dekker, 2006

Species brought into synonymy

- Kanekotrochus yokohamensis (Bock, 1878): synonym of Kanekotrochus infuscatus (Gould, 1861)
