= Alcyna australis =

Scientific classification
- Kingdom: Animalia
- Phylum: Mollusca
- Class: Gastropoda
- Subclass: Vetigastropoda
- Order: Trochida
- Superfamily: Trochoidea
- Family: Trochidae
- Genus: Alcyna
- Species: A. australis

Binomial name
- Alcyna australis Hedley, 1907

Species of gastropod

Alcyna australis is a species of sea snail, a marine gastropod mollusk in the family Trochidae, the top snails.

== Description ==
The size of the shell varies between 1.8 mm and 2.5 mm. The small shell has a broadly conical shape. The 4½ whorls are rounded and increase rapidly in size.

Colour: adult whorls dull white, protoconch dark purple.

Sculpture: the base is ornamented with spaced spiral grooves. These occur, but fainter, on the penultimate whorl. The protoconch, embracing 2½ whorls, is more strongly spirally furrowed. The large aperture is round. Into it projects from the columella a prominent tooth-like tubercle. The contrast in colour and sculpture between the apical and succeeding whorls distinguishes this species.

== Distribution ==
This marine species is endemic to Australia and occurs off Queensland, Western Australia, Tasmania and in the Timor Sea.
