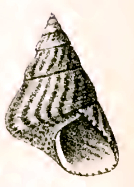
- Drawing of a shell of Prothalotia lehmanni

Scientific classification
- Kingdom: Animalia
- Phylum: Mollusca
- Class: Gastropoda
- Subclass: Vetigastropoda
- Order: Trochida
- Family: Trochidae
- Subfamily: Cantharidinae
- Genus: Prothalotia
- Species: P. lehmanni

Binomial name
- Prothalotia lehmanni (Menke, 1843)

Synonyms
- Cantharidus lehmanni (Menke, 1843); Notogibbula sulcosa A. Adams, 1851; Phasianella elegans Lamarck, J.B. 1822; Trochus lehmanni Menke, 1843 (original combination); Trochus nitens Kiener, L.C. 1859

= Prothalotia lehmanni =

Species of gastropod

Prothalotia lehmanni, common name Lehmann's top shell, is a species of sea snail, a marine gastropod mollusk in the family Trochidae, the top snails.

== Description ==
The Prothalotia lehmanni shares the corneous operculum shell specific to the Trochidae family, and has the common nacreous interior. On the small side, Lehmann's top snail ranges from 10mm to 17mm in size.

== Distribution ==
This marine species is endemic to Australia and occurs off South Australia and Western Australia.
