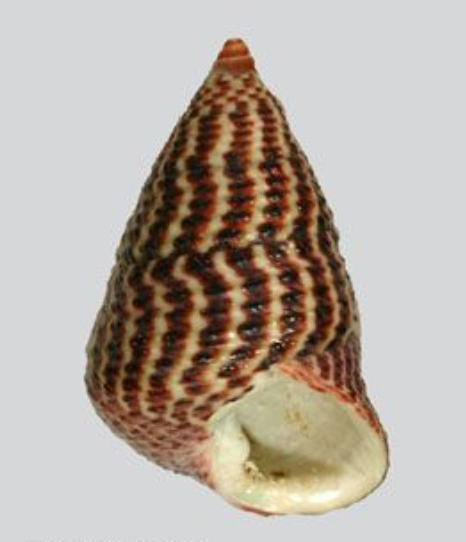
- Shell of Thalotia conica (specimen at the Natural History Museum Rotterdam)

Scientific classification
- Kingdom: Animalia
- Phylum: Mollusca
- Class: Gastropoda
- Subclass: Vetigastropoda
- Order: Trochida
- Superfamily: Trochoidea
- Family: Trochidae
- Genus: Thalotia
- Species: T. conica

Binomial name
- Thalotia conica (Gray, 1827)

Synonyms
- Monodonta conica Gray, 1827 (basionym); Monodonta turrita Menke, 1843; Trochus abnormis Crosse, 1864; Trochus lehmanni Kiener, 1875; Thalotia dubia Tenison-Woods, 1878; Thalotia pictus Wood, 1828; Trochus pictus W. Wood, 1828; Trochus troschelli Philippi, 1850

= Thalotia conica =

Species of gastropod

Thalotia conica, common name the conical top shell, is a species of sea snail, a marine gastropod mollusk in the family Trochidae, the top snails.

== Description ==
The solid shell is imperforate and elevated conical. The length of the shell varies between 13 mm and 23 mm. The spire is pinkish or grayish white with a crimson apex and numerous close longitudinal dark reddish-brown stripes, often cut into tessellations by the spiral grooves of the surface. The body whorl is dark-purple, with oblique, more or less zig-zag pale lines. The spire is straightly conical. The apex is acute. The sutures are linear. The seven whorls are nearly planulate, the last one obtusely subangular at the periphery. The whorls of the spire are encircled by 5 or 6 more or less granose lirae, spiral moniliform lines; the body whorl with about 13 or 14 in front of the aperture.. The wrinkles of increment are more or less prominent. The aperture is rhomboidal. The outer lip is thickened and crenulated within. The thick peristome is plicate within. The straight columella is denticulate, ending abruptly in a strong basal truncation. The operculum is multispiral. This species is rather variable in sculpture; the spaces between the spiral ribs are often occupied by lirulae

== Distribution ==
This marine shell occurs off Southwest Australia to New South Wales and off Tasmania
