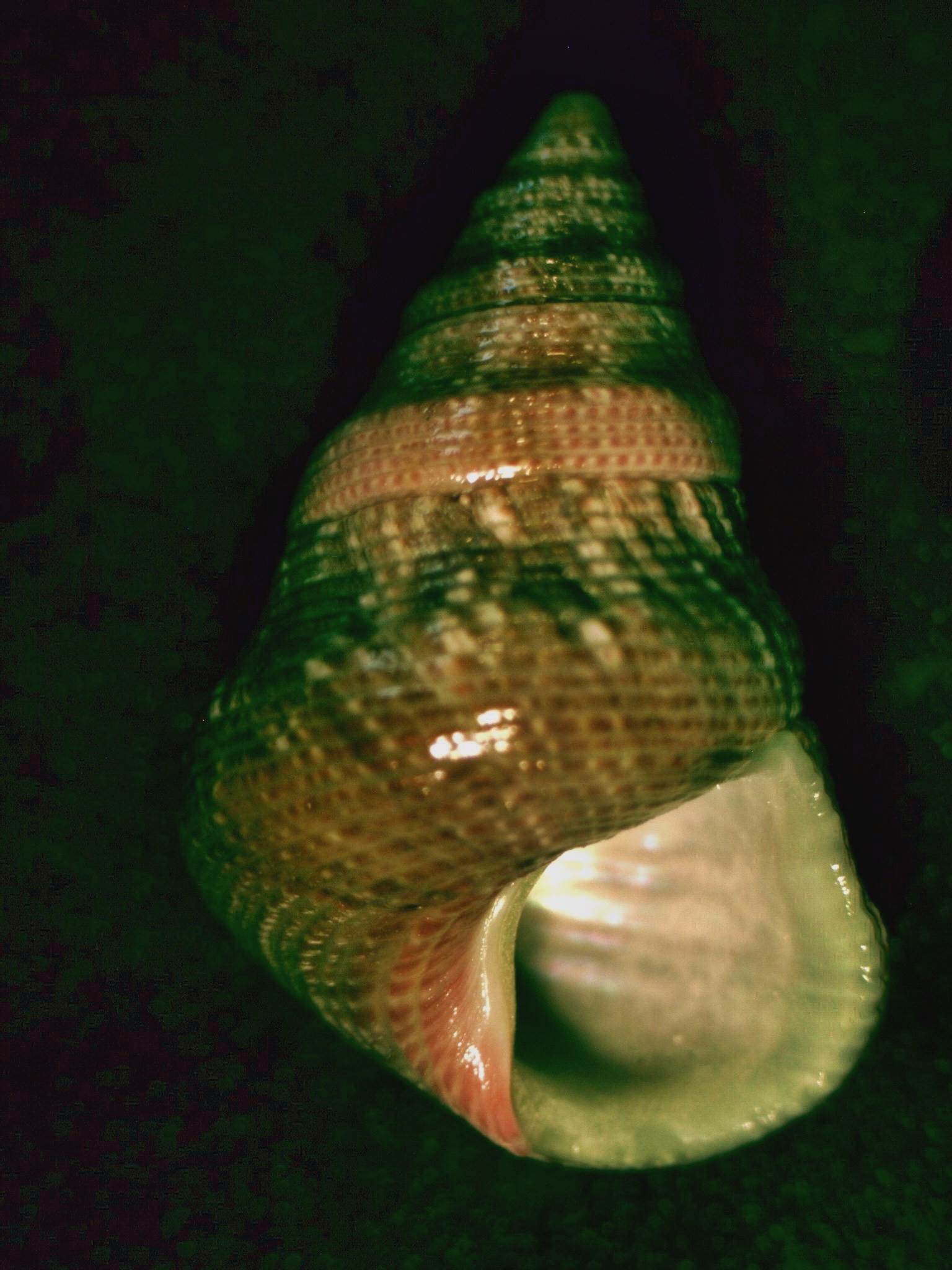
- Apertural view of a shell of Prothalotia ramburi

Scientific classification
- Kingdom: Animalia
- Phylum: Mollusca
- Class: Gastropoda
- Subclass: Vetigastropoda
- Order: Trochida
- Family: Trochidae
- Subfamily: Cantharidinae
- Genus: Prothalotia
- Species: P. ramburi

Binomial name
- Prothalotia ramburi (Crosse, 1864)

Synonyms
- Cantharidus lesueuri var. ramburi (Crosse, 1864); Trochus ramburi Crosse, 1864

= Prothalotia ramburi =

Species of gastropod

Prothalotia ramburi, common name Rambur's jewel top shell, is a species of sea snail, a marine gastropod mollusk in the family Trochidae, the top snails.

== Description ==
The size of the shell varies between 7 mm and 20 mm. The solid, imperforate shell has a pointed conical shape. It is crimson with narrow radiating whitish flames on the upper surface, usually extending to the periphery, and an umbilical tract of red and white tessellated. This shell has typically a coral-red or crimson color, flammulated above with whitish. Fully adult examples often show the light flames only upon the upper whorls. The spire is lengthened. The apex is subacute. The sutures are subimpressed. The about 7 whorls are concave below the sutures, convex and swollen at the periphery and on the lower edge of each whorl of the spire. The whole surface is finely spirally lirate, the lirae about as wide as the interstices, which are delicately obliquely striate. The aperture is oval-quadrate, iridescent within and measures less than half the length of shell. The peristome is edged by a row of crimson dots, with a porcellaneous internal thickening which is finely crenulate. The vertical columella is slightly arcuate and is pearly.

== Distribution ==
This marine species is endemic to Australia and occurs off South Australia.
