= Odontotrochus poppei =

Scientific classification
- Kingdom: Animalia
- Phylum: Mollusca
- Class: Gastropoda
- Subclass: Vetigastropoda
- Order: Trochida
- Family: Trochidae
- Subfamily: Cantharidinae
- Genus: Odontotrochus
- Species: O. poppei

Binomial name
- Odontotrochus poppei Lan, 1991

Species of gastropod

Odontotrochus chlorostomus is a species of sea snail, a marine gastropod mollusk in the family Trochidae, the top snails.
