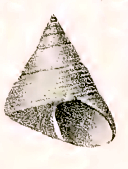
- Drawing of a shell of Prothalotia chlorites

Scientific classification
- Kingdom: Animalia
- Phylum: Mollusca
- Class: Gastropoda
- Subclass: Vetigastropoda
- Order: Trochida
- Family: Trochidae
- Subfamily: Cantharidinae
- Genus: Prothalotia
- Species: P. chlorites

Binomial name
- Prothalotia chlorites (Philippi, 1846)

Synonyms
- Cantharidus chlorites (Philippi, 1846); Trochus chlorites Philippi, 1846 (original description); Trochus viridulus Menke, 1843

= Prothalotia chlorites =

Species of gastropod

Prothalotia chlorites is a species of sea snail, a marine gastropod mollusk in the family Trochidae, the top snails.

== Description ==
The height of the shell attains 7 mm, its diameter 6 mm. The imperforate shell has an obliquely pyramidal shape. Its color is yellowish-green without spots. The whorls are entirely flat and are transversely sulcate-striate, marginate. Each whorl has 5 elevated transverse lines. The angle of the body whorl is rounded. The base of the shell is slightly convex and contains numerous transverse lines, mostly punctate. The suture is profound. The aperture is subquadrangular. The lip is smooth within. The columella is pretty vertical.

== Distribution ==
This marine species is endemic to Australia and occurs off Western Australia.
