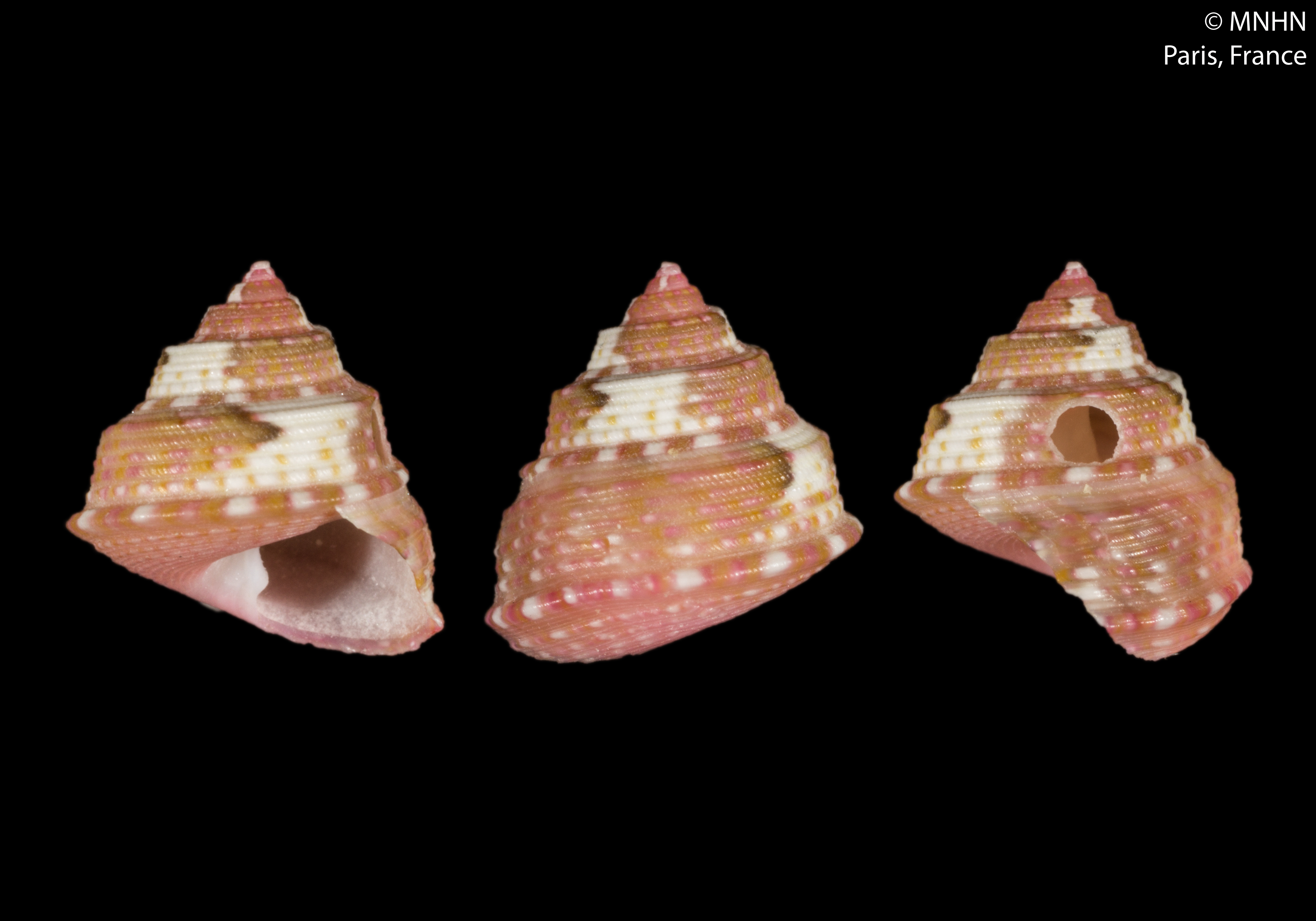
- Shell of Thalotia tiaraeides (holotype at MNHN, Paris)

Scientific classification
- Kingdom: Animalia
- Phylum: Mollusca
- Class: Gastropoda
- Subclass: Vetigastropoda
- Order: Trochida
- Superfamily: Trochoidea
- Family: Trochidae
- Genus: Thalotia
- Species: T. tiaraeides

Binomial name
- Thalotia tiaraeides Vilvens, 2012

= Thalotia tiaraeides =

Species of gastropod

Thalotia tiaraeides is a species of sea snail, a marine gastropod mollusk in the family Trochidae, the top snails. The name etymology is derived from the neutral Greek nouns of tiara (τιάρα) and species (είδηζ), referencing the gastropod's shape reminiscent of an ancient tiara.

== Description ==
Thalotia tiaraeides is a small white top snail of the Cantharidinae subfamily. The smooth polished shell has a moderately elevated spire with partly-sutured angulated keel making up the gastropod shell. 6 main granular spiral cords rest on the last whorl along with a thick peripheral keel. Up to 10 low, narrow spinal cords lies on the slight convex base of the shell, with a columellar expansion partially covering the deep umbilicus.

The adult shell size is considered small for its genus -- with a height up to 6.6 mm and a width of 6.4mm.

== Distribution ==
This marine species occurs off the Austral Islands and French Polynesia.
