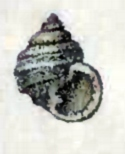
- Drawing with an apertural view of a shell of Alcyna lucida

Scientific classification
- Kingdom: Animalia
- Phylum: Mollusca
- Class: Gastropoda
- Subclass: Vetigastropoda
- Order: Trochida
- Superfamily: Trochoidea
- Family: Trochidae
- Genus: Alcyna
- Species: A. lucida

Binomial name
- Alcyna lucida (H. Adams, 1868)

Synonyms
- Nevillia lucida H. Adams, 1868; Rissoia lucida H. Adams, 1868

= Alcyna lucida =

Species of gastropod

Alcyna lucida, a species of sea snail, a marine gastropod mollusk in the family Trochidae.

== Description ==
The rather solid, imperforate. subpellucid shell is white, with subdistant spiral riblets, and very minute longitudinal striae. The five, convex whorls show an impressed suture. The columellar tooth and external varix are strong.

== Distribution ==
This species occurs in the Indian Ocean off Mauritius.
