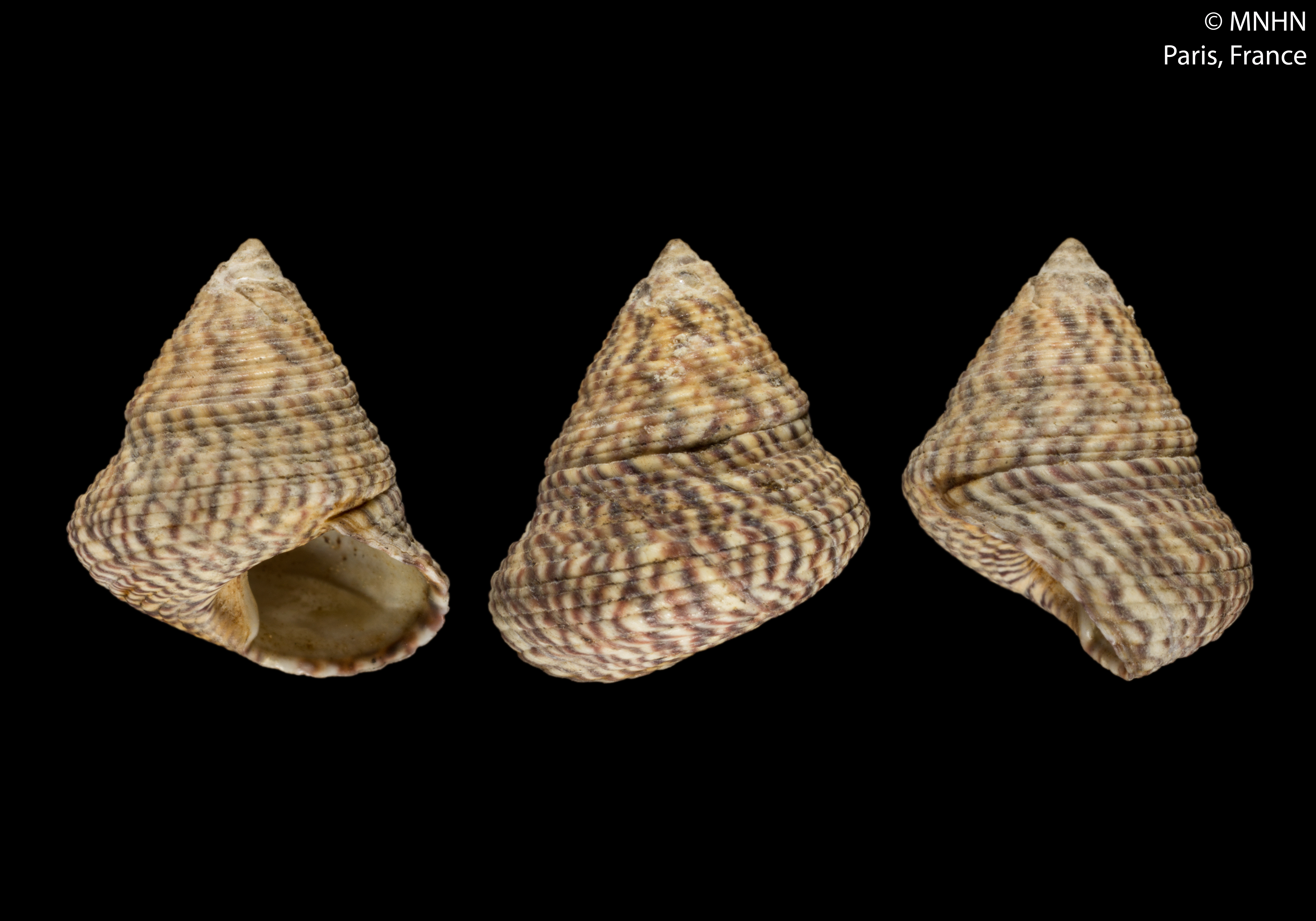
- Shell of Prothalotia flindersi (syntype at MNHN, Paris)

Scientific classification
- Kingdom: Animalia
- Phylum: Mollusca
- Class: Gastropoda
- Subclass: Vetigastropoda
- Order: Trochida
- Family: Trochidae
- Subfamily: Cantharidinae
- Genus: Prothalotia
- Species: P. flindersi

Binomial name
- Prothalotia flindersi (P. Fischer, 1878)

Synonyms
- Cantharidus (Prothalotia) flindersi (Fischer, 1878); Trochus flindersi Fischer, P. 1878

= Prothalotia flindersi =

Species of gastropod

Prothalotia flindersi, common name the Flinders top shell, is a species of sea snail, a marine gastropod mollusk in the family Trochidae, the top snails.

== Description ==
The height of the shell attains 16 mm, its diameter 13 mm. The rather thick, very narrowly perforate shell has a conical shape. It contains 7 to 8 planulate whorls. The first one is eroded, the succeeding are whitish-ashen, radiated with narrow, close and flexuose blackish and violaceous lines. They are spirally cingulate, with 6 lirae on penultimate whorl. The body whorl is subangular, a little depressed above, dilated in the middle. The base of the shell is convex and ornamented with about 8 lirae. The aperture is rhomboidal. The lip is simple. The truncate columella is truncate below.

== Distribution ==
This marine species is endemic to Australia and occurs off South Australia and Western Australia.
