= Kanekotrochus vietnamensis =

Scientific classification
- Kingdom: Animalia
- Phylum: Mollusca
- Class: Gastropoda
- Subclass: Vetigastropoda
- Order: Trochida
- Superfamily: Trochoidea
- Family: Trochidae
- Genus: Kanekotrochus
- Species: K. vietnamensis

Binomial name
- Kanekotrochus vietnamensis Dekker, 2006

Species of gastropod

Kanekotrochus vietnamensis is a species of sea snail, a marine gastropod mollusk in the family Trochidae, the top snails.

== Description ==
The size of the shell varies between 12 mm and 20 mm.

== Distribution ==
This marine species occurs off Vietnam.
