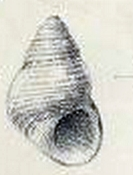
- Original drawing of a shell of Alcyna lifuensis

Scientific classification
- Kingdom: Animalia
- Phylum: Mollusca
- Class: Gastropoda
- Subclass: Vetigastropoda
- Order: Trochida
- Superfamily: Trochoidea
- Family: Trochidae
- Genus: Alcyna
- Species: A. lifuensis

Binomial name
- Alcyna lifuensis Melvill & Standen, 1896

= Alcyna lifuensis =

Species of gastropod

Alcyna lifuensis is a species of sea snail, a marine gastropod mollusk in the family Trochidae, the top snails.

== Description ==
The height of the shell attains 1.75 mm, its diameter 1 mm. It is a brightly colored small, imperforate shell with five slightly swollen whorls. These are white with transverse interrupted red lines encircling it spirally. Around the periphery these lines are regularly interrupted, leaving equal white spaces. Below the suture on the body whorl there are square white spaces left bare. The aperture is round. The outer lip is plain and slightly effuse. The columella has a very strong tooth near the base.

== Distribution ==
This species occurs in the Pacific Ocean off the Loyalty Islands.
