= Cantharidus rariguttatus =

Scientific classification
- Kingdom: Animalia
- Phylum: Mollusca
- Class: Gastropoda
- Subclass: Vetigastropoda
- Order: Trochida
- Superfamily: Trochoidea
- Family: Trochidae
- Genus: Cantharidus
- Species: C. rariguttatus

Binomial name
- Cantharidus rariguttatus Sowerby, G.B. III, 1916

Synonyms
- Thallotia rariguttata (G.B. Sowerby III, 1916)

Species of gastropod

Cantharidus rariguttatus is a species of sea snail, a marine gastropod mollusk in the family Trochidae, the top snails.

This is a taxon inquirendum.

== Description ==
The height of an adult shell attains 10 mm.

== Distribution ==
This marine species occurs off the Philippines.
