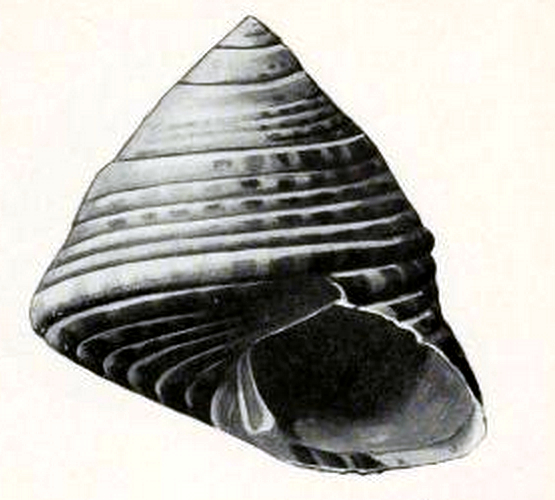
- Drawing with an apertural view of a shell of Prothalotia suturalis

Scientific classification
- Kingdom: Animalia
- Phylum: Mollusca
- Class: Gastropoda
- Subclass: Vetigastropoda
- Order: Trochida
- Family: Trochidae
- Subfamily: Cantharidinae
- Genus: Prothalotia
- Species: P. suturalis

Binomial name
- Prothalotia suturalis (A. Adams, 1853)

Synonyms
- Cantharidus suturalis (A. Adams, 1853); Jujubinus suturalis (A. Adams, 1853); Thalotia suturalis A. Adams, 1853

= Prothalotia suturalis =

Species of gastropod

Prothalotia suturalis is a species of sea snail, a marine gastropod mollusk in the family Trochidae, the top snails.

== Description ==
The height of the shell attains 8 mm, its diameter also 8 mm. The small, solid, imperforate shell has a pyramidal shape. The apex is eroded, but the whorls apparently number six. They are flattened, slightly gradated, the body whorl descending a little at the aperture. The colour is pale yellow, tessellated with small, longitudinal undulating purple spots. The sculpture: low, flat-topped spiral ribs equal to the intervening spaces, on the body whorl twelve, of which half are basal. The aperture is subquadrate. The columella is short and terminates below in a blunt tubercle. The sutures are impressed. The base of the shell is flat. The inner lip is turned inwards and is greenish.

== Distribution ==
This marine species is endemic to Australia and occurs off Northern Queensland and in the Gulf of Carpentaria.
