= Prothalotia porteri =

Scientific classification
- Kingdom: Animalia
- Phylum: Mollusca
- Class: Gastropoda
- Subclass: Vetigastropoda
- Order: Trochida
- Family: Trochidae
- Subfamily: Cantharidinae
- Genus: Prothalotia
- Species: P. porteri

Binomial name
- Prothalotia porteri (Iredale, 1940)

Synonyms
- Calthalotia porteri Iredale, 1940

Species of gastropod

Prothalotia porteri is a species of sea snail, a marine gastropod mollusk in the family Trochidae, the top snails.

== Distribution ==
This marine species is endemic to Australia and occurs off Lord Howe Island.
