= Kanekotrochus boninensis =

Scientific classification
- Kingdom: Animalia
- Phylum: Mollusca
- Class: Gastropoda
- Subclass: Vetigastropoda
- Order: Trochida
- Superfamily: Trochoidea
- Family: Trochidae
- Genus: Kanekotrochus
- Species: K. boninensis

Binomial name
- Kanekotrochus boninensis (Okutani, 2001)

Synonyms
- Prothalotia boninensis Okutani, 2001 (original combination)

Species of gastropod

Kanekotrochus boninensis is a species of sea snail, a marine gastropod mollusk in the family Trochidae, the top snails.

== Distribution ==
This marine species occurs off Japan.
