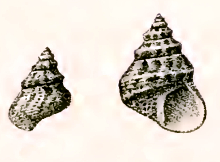
- Drawing with two views of a shell of Prothalotia lesueuri

Scientific classification
- Kingdom: Animalia
- Phylum: Mollusca
- Class: Gastropoda
- Subclass: Vetigastropoda
- Order: Trochida
- Family: Trochidae
- Subfamily: Cantharidinae
- Genus: Prothalotia
- Species: P. lesueuri

Binomial name
- Prothalotia lesueuri (P. Fischer, 1880)

Synonyms
- Cantharidus lesueuri (Fischer, 1880); Thalotia picta Angas, 1865; Trochus lesueuri Fischer, 1880

= Prothalotia lesueuri =

Species of gastropod

Prothalotia lesueuri, common name Lesueur's top shell, is a species of sea snail, a marine gastropod mollusk in the family Trochidae, the top snails.

== Description ==
The height of the shell varies between 13 mm and 19 mm, its diameter between 10 mm and 11 mm. The somewhat solid, imperforate shell has an elongated conical shape. It is whitish or a little tinged with olive, painted with numerous rather narrow longitudinal olive-brown or reddish-brown stripes generally broken into tessellations on the base. The spire is long. The whitish apex is subacute. The sutures are moderately impressed. The about 7 whorls are flat or concave below the sutures, convex and swollen at the periphery and above each suture. They are encircled by numerous fine lirae. The body whorl is a trifle deflexed at the aperture and is often subangular at the periphery. The rhomboidal aperture measures less than half the total length of shell. The acute peristome is rather thin, and edged by a row of red dots, thickened a little distance within, the thickening finely crenulated. The vertical columella is marked with crimson at the outer base.

== Description ==
This marine species is endemic to Australia and occurs off South Australia and Tasmania.
