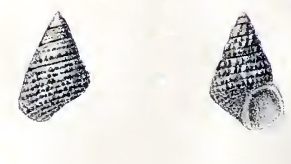
- Drawing with two views of a shell of Prothalotia pulcherrima

Scientific classification
- Kingdom: Animalia
- Phylum: Mollusca
- Class: Gastropoda
- Subclass: Vetigastropoda
- Order: Trochida
- Family: Trochidae
- Subfamily: Cantharidinae
- Genus: Prothalotia
- Species: P. pulcherrima

Binomial name
- Prothalotia pulcherrima (W. Wood, 1828)

Synonyms
- Cantharidus pulcherrimus (Wood, 1828); Thalotia mariae Tenison-Woods, 1877; Trochus preissii Menke, 1843; Trochus pulcherrimus Wood, 1828 (original combination)

= Prothalotia pulcherrima =

Species of gastropod

Prothalotia pulcherrima, common name the beautiful jewel top shell, is a species of sea snail, a marine gastropod mollusk in the family Trochidae, the top snails.

== Description ==
The length of the shell varies between 12 mm and 20 mm. The elongated, thick and solid shell is imperforate and has an acutely conical shape. The spire is straightly conical. The apex is subacute. The sutures are linear. The about 6 whorls are nearly flat. The penultimate has four or five broad flat spiral ribs, often unequal in width, separated by narrow impressed grooves. The subangular body whorl has four or five broad fiat low ribs above the periphery and more numerous narrower ones on the base. The ribs are usually purplish-crimson articulated with narrow white marks. The small aperture is less than one-half the length of shell. It is oblique, oval, brilliantly iridescent and somewhat sulcated inside. The peristome is edged with a line of intense crimson, bordered with greenish inside. The vertical columella is slightly arcuate but straight in the middle. The parietal wall is covered by a light callus.

== Distribution ==
This marine species is endemic to Australia and occurs off Victoria to Western Australia and off Northern Tasmania.
