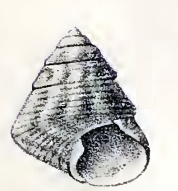
- Drawing of a shell of Calthalotia baudini

Scientific classification
- Kingdom: Animalia
- Phylum: Mollusca
- Class: Gastropoda
- Subclass: Vetigastropoda
- Order: Trochida
- Superfamily: Trochoidea
- Family: Trochidae
- Genus: Calthalotia
- Species: C. baudini

Binomial name
- Calthalotia baudini (P. Fischer, 1878)

Synonyms
- Cantharidus baudini (Fischer, 1878); Prothalotia baudini (P. Fischer, 1878); Trochus baudini Fischer, 1878 (original description)

= Calthalotia baudini =

Species of gastropod

Calthalotia baudini is a species of sea snail, a marine gastropod mollusk in the family Trochidae, the top snails.

== Description ==
The size of the shell attains 15 mm. The rather thick, imperforate shell has a conic-elongate shape. The 6 to 7 whorls are planulate, the first buff, eroded, the following whitish, ornamented with sparse rosy points and angular chestnut streaks. The shell is spirally lirate, with about 8 lirae on the penultimate whorl. The subangular body whorl is depressed above. The base of the shell is convex, with about 8 concentric lirae. Tnere is no umbilical perforation. The aperture is rhomboidal. The lip is simple. The short columella is subnodose-truncate below.

== Distribution ==
This marine species is endemic to Australia and occurs off Western Australia and King Island, South Australia.
