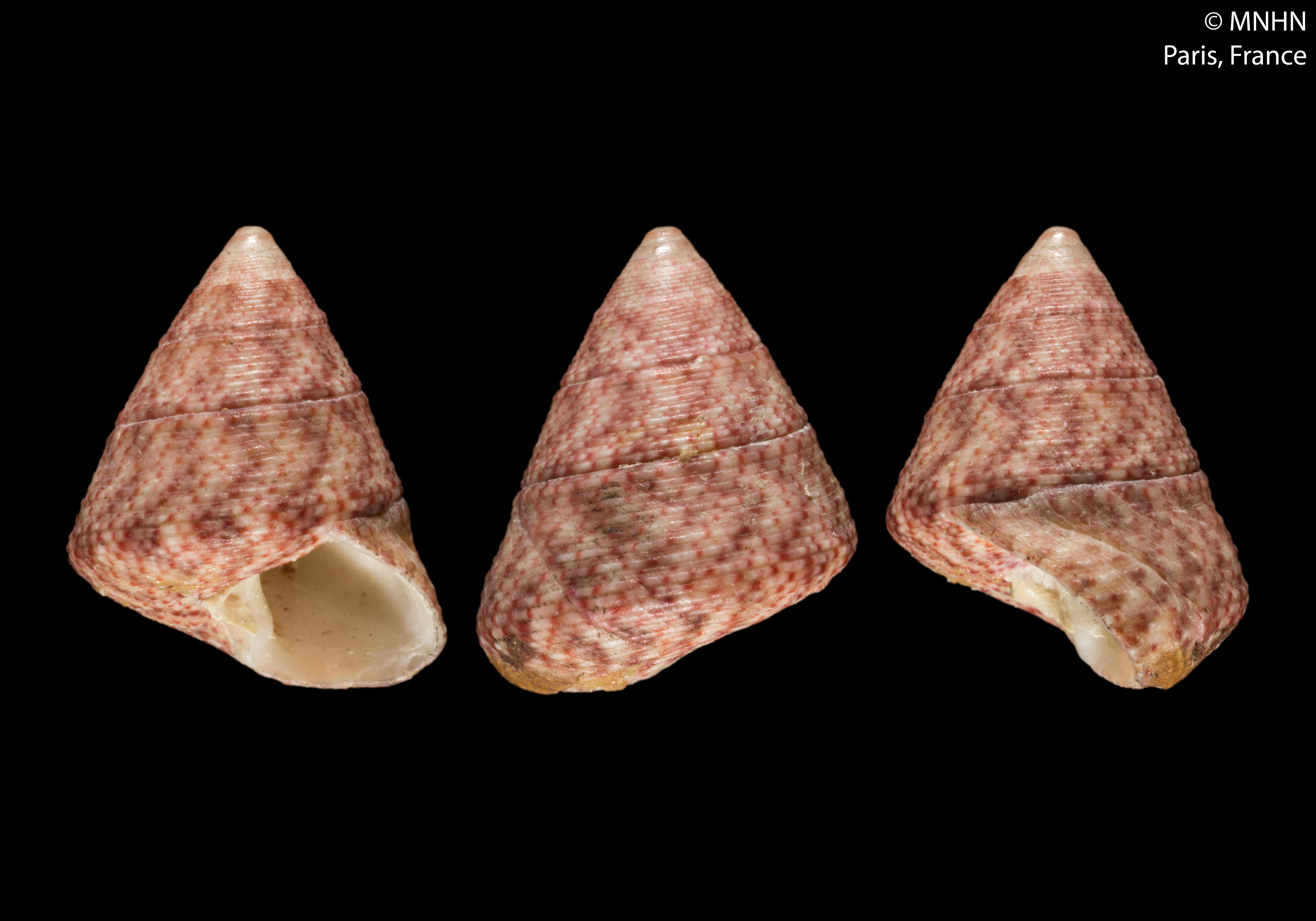
- Shell of Odontotrochus chlorostomus (syntype at MNHN, Paris)

Scientific classification
- Kingdom: Animalia
- Phylum: Mollusca
- Class: Gastropoda
- Subclass: Vetigastropoda
- Order: Trochida
- Family: Trochidae
- Subfamily: Cantharidinae
- Genus: Odontotrochus
- Species: O. chlorostomus

Binomial name
- Odontotrochus chlorostomus (Menke, K.T., 1843)

Synonyms
- Cantharidus blandianus Pilsbry, H.A. 1889; Cantharidus chlorostomus Pilsbry, H.A. 1889; Cantharidus freycineti Pilsbry, H.A. 1889; Cantharidus neglectus Hedley, C. 1916; Thalotia chlorostoma (Menke, 1843); Thalotia neglectus Tate, 1893; Trochus blandianus Crosse, 1864; Trochus chlorostomus Menke, 1843 (original description); Trochus freycineti Fischer, 1878; Zizipphinus blandianus Angas, G.F. 1865; Ziziphinus chlorostomus Angas, G.F. 1865

= Odontotrochus chlorostomus =

Species of gastropod

Odontotrochus chlorostomus is a species of sea snail, a marine gastropod mollusk in the family Trochidae, the top snails

This species has several common names: Bland's top shell, floral top shell, Freycinet's top shell, red kelp shell and Tate's top shell.

== Description ==
The size of the adult shell of this species varies between 20 mm and 30 mm. The solid, imperforate shell has a conical shape and is elevated-trochiform,. The first whorls are red, the following reddish-brown, more or less tinged with puff, and in places with olive-green, and sparsely maculate with whitish. The spiral ribs are more or less articulated minutely with whitish. The 8 to 9 whorls are flat or a trifle concave They are acutely carinated with the carina a trifle projecting above the sutures. The upper surface of each whorl is encircled by 10 to 12 spiral lirae. These are only slightly elevated, and show strong, regular oblique striae of increment in the interliral interstices. The base of the shell is flat, with about 10 concentric narrow lirae. These are strongly, regularly radiately striate. The rhomboidal aperture is very oblique, iridescent and sulcate within. The outer and basal lips are edged with green and are plicate-denticulate within. The green columella is curved, ending in a strong tooth at its base.

== Distribution ==
This marine species is endemic to Australia and occurs off South Australia and Western Australia.
