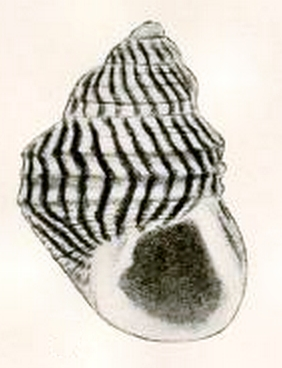
- Drawing of a variety of a shell of Alcyna subangulata

Scientific classification
- Kingdom: Animalia
- Phylum: Mollusca
- Class: Gastropoda
- Subclass: Vetigastropoda
- Order: Trochida
- Superfamily: Trochoidea
- Family: Trochidae
- Genus: Alcyna
- Species: A. subangulata

Binomial name
- Alcyna subangulata Pease, 1861

Synonyms
- Alcyna flammulata Pilsbry, 1917; Alcyna lineata Pease, 1869; Alcyna striata Pease, 1869; Alcyna subangulata flammulata Pilsbry, 1917; Alcyna subangulata virgata Pilsbry, 1917; Alcyna virgata Pilsbry, 1917; Nevillia picta H. Adams, 1868; Rissoia picta H. Adams, 1868; Thalotia subangulata (Pease, W.H., 1861)

= Alcyna subangulata =

Species of gastropod

Alcyna subangulata is a species of sea snail, a marine gastropod mollusk in the family Trochidae, the top snails.

== Description ==
The height of the shell attains 2½ mm, its diameter 1½ mm. The minute, rather solid, narrowly perforate shell has an ovate-turbinate shape. It is ornamented with raised spiral striae. The four whorls are depressed somewhat in the center. The body whorl is obtusely biangular with about four low spiral cords above the upper angle, two and a very weak third between the angles. The base of the shell contains numerous spirals. The outer lip is thickened externally with a swelling or varix. The umbilicus is rather large. The aperture is circular. The columella ends in a prominent tooth. The color is deep red, wtth oblique light red flames radiating from the suture.

== Distribution ==
This marine species occurs off the Seychelles, Mauritius, Réunion and Hawaii.
