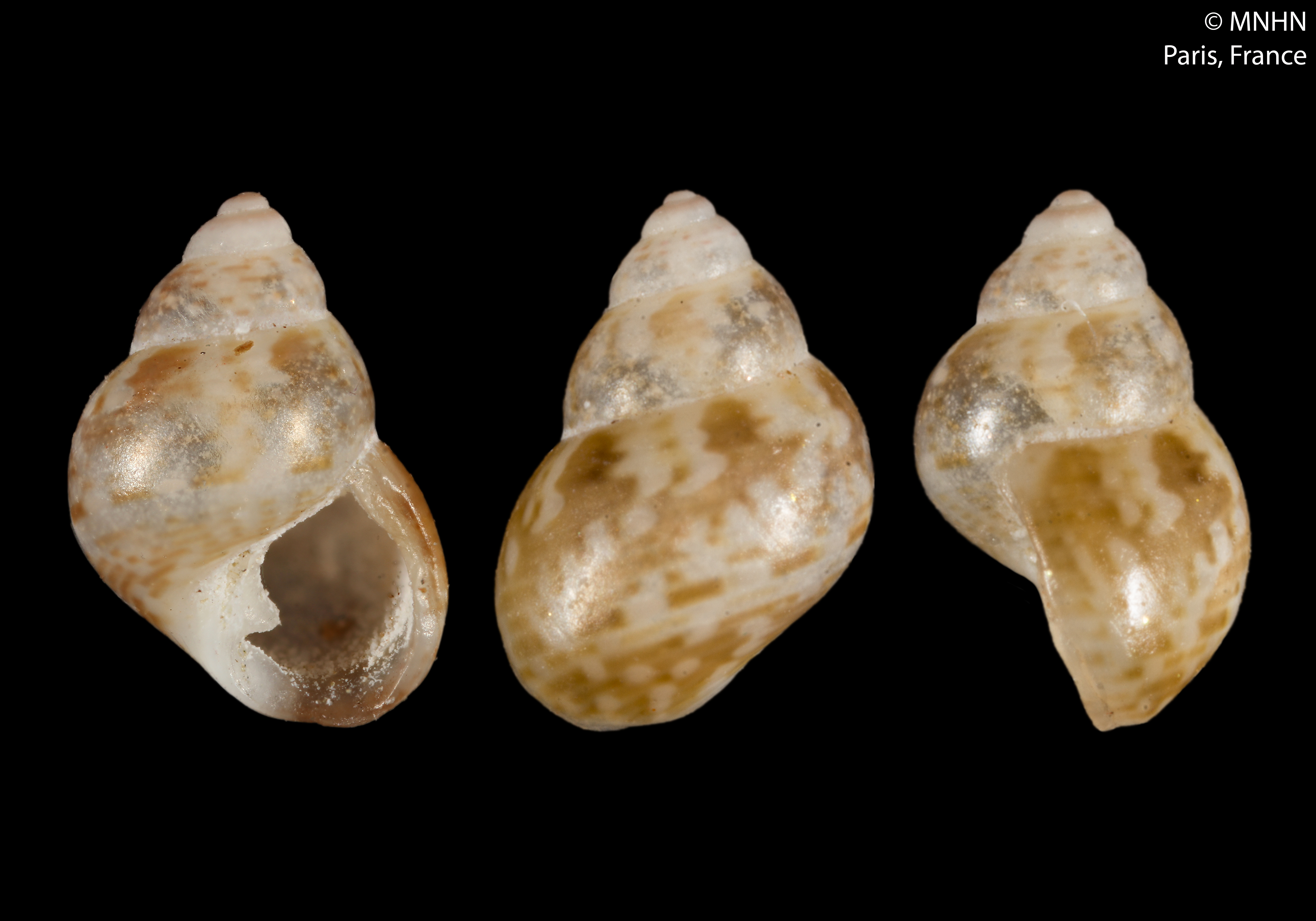
- Shell of Alcyna ocellata (syntype at MNHN, paris)

Scientific classification
- Kingdom: Animalia
- Phylum: Mollusca
- Class: Gastropoda
- Subclass: Vetigastropoda
- Order: Trochida
- Superfamily: Trochoidea
- Family: Trochidae
- Genus: Alcyna
- Species: A. ocellata

Binomial name
- Alcyna ocellata A. Adams, 1860

Synonyms
- Alcyna kapiolantae Pilsbry, 1917; Alcyna kuhnsi Pilsbry, 1917; Alcyna kuhnsi humerosa Pilsbry, 1917; Alcyna kuhnsi kuhnsi Pilsbry, H.A., 1917; Alcyna lepida A. Adams, 1860; Alcyna rubra Pease, 1861; Thalotia ocellata (A. Adams, 1860)

= Alcyna ocellata =

Species of gastropod

Alcyna ocellata is a species of sea snail, a marine gastropod mollusk in the family Trochidae, the top snails.

== Description ==
The shell grows to a length of 2 mm. The shell is smooth and imperforate. The whorls are slightly convex. They are pale crimson, the last encircled by ocellated spots. The columella terminates in a prominent acute denticle. The operculum is non-calcareous.

== Distribution ==
This marine shell occurs off Japan, New Caledonia and Hawaii.
