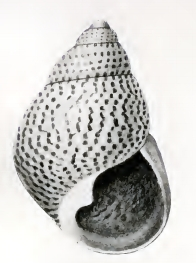
- Drawing of a shell of Alcyna exigua

Scientific classification
- Kingdom: Animalia
- Phylum: Mollusca
- Class: Gastropoda
- Subclass: Vetigastropoda
- Order: Trochida
- Superfamily: Trochoidea
- Family: Trochidae
- Genus: Alcyna
- Species: A. exigua

Binomial name
- Alcyna exigua (Gould, 1861)

Synonyms
- Elenchus exiguus Gould, 1861

= Alcyna exigua =

Species of gastropod

Alcyna exigua is a species of sea snail, a marine gastropod mollusk in the family Trochidae, the top snails.

== Distribution ==
This species occurs in the East China Sea
