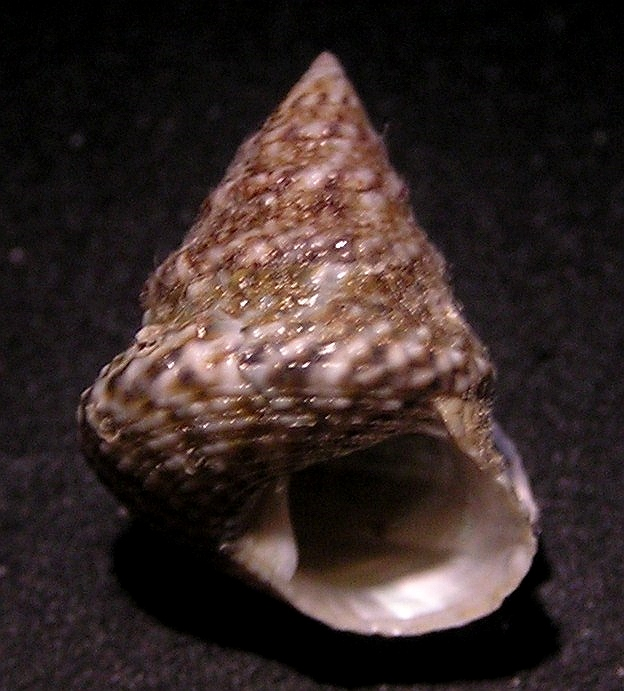
- Apertural view of a shell of Calthalotia arruensis

Scientific classification
- Kingdom: Animalia
- Phylum: Mollusca
- Class: Gastropoda
- Subclass: Vetigastropoda
- Order: Trochida
- Superfamily: Trochoidea
- Family: Trochidae
- Genus: Calthalotia
- Species: C. arruensis

Binomial name
- Calthalotia arruensis (Watson, 1880)

Synonyms
- Calliostoma arruense Watson, 1880 (original combination); Calthalotia marginata (Tenison-Woods, J.E., 1880); Calthalotia nitidissima Ludbrook, N.H. 1941; Trochus (Thalotia) torresi Smith, E.A. 1884; Trochus (Ziziphinus) arruensis Watson, R.B. 1880

= Calthalotia arruensis =

Species of gastropod

Calthalotia arruensis is a species of sea snail in the family Trochidae.

== Description ==
The strong, opaque shell has a conical shape. It is carinated and flat on the base. It is covered with tubercles, and colored with gray and pink. Its sculpture shows eight spiral rows of small round tubercles on each whorl. The tubercles on the first two rows, are larger than the others; these, as well as the next three rows, are parted by distinct depressions. The lowest three rows are much closer together, but project a little, especially the center and largest row of the three. On the base there are about nine less strongly tuberculated spiral threads with feebler threads between. These intermediate threads become feebler towards the center. The tubercles are smooth and polished, but the whole intervening surface is sharply fretted with fine oblique puckerings.

The color of the shell is white, beautifully flecked above with grayish-purple patches, and closely spotted with purplish-pink on the base. The spire is high and sharp pointed. Its concavely conical slope is slightly broken at the sutures by the projection of the two superior rows of tubercles. It contains about ten flat whorls that increase very regularly in size. The suture is slight, but distinct, being defined by the slight carinal spiral above, and the double row of large tubercles below. The aperture is rather small, square, and very oblique. The outer lip is sharp but strong. The inner lip is strengthened internally by a buttress of porcelaneous nacre, which ends abruptly towards the point of the columella, forming a tooth. The columella, beveled off to a sharp edge, is pressed back on the umbilicus, which it completely closes, leaving only a central depression and a post-columellar furrow. The operculum is thin, yellow, and normal.

== Distribution ==
This marine species is endemic to Australia and occurs off Queensland.
