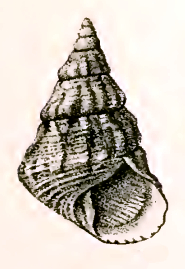
- Image of a shell of Tosatrochus attenuatus

Scientific classification
- Kingdom: Animalia
- Phylum: Mollusca
- Class: Gastropoda
- Subclass: Vetigastropoda
- Order: Trochida
- Superfamily: Trochoidea
- Family: Trochidae
- Genus: Tosatrochus
- Species: T. attenuatus

Binomial name
- Tosatrochus attenuatus (Jonas, 1844)

Synonyms
- Cantharidus (Thalotia) elongatus Wood, 1828; Thalotia aspera Kuroda & Habe, 1952 junior subjective synonym; Thalotia attenuata (Jonas, 1844); Trochus attenuatus Jonas, 1844 (original combination); Trochus elongatus Wood, 1828

= Tosatrochus attenuatus =

Species of gastropod

Tosatrochus attenuatus is a species of sea snail, a marine gastropod mollusk in the family Trochidae, the top snails.

== Description ==
The height of the shell varies between 25 mm and 30 mm. The thick, imperforate or very narrowly perforate shell has a conic-elongated shape. It is whitish, ornamented with radiating livid-brown flammules, brown punctulate. The nine whorls are convex, spirally lirate (the lirae unequal) and longitudinally nodose-costate, the nodules more prominent below. The sutures are impressed. The angulated body whorl is depressed beneath the sutures and nodulous at the periphery. It is very convex and with about eight concentric lirae beneath, the interstices with intercalated lirulae. The aperture is subquadrate and canaliculate within. The basal margin is arcuate and plicate. The columella is subangular, concave, strongly truncate at base, with a short callus over the umbilicus.

== Distribution ==
This marine species occurs off the South Australia, Western Australia and the Western Pacific.
