= Kanekotrochus infuscatus =

Scientific classification
- Kingdom: Animalia
- Phylum: Mollusca
- Class: Gastropoda
- Subclass: Vetigastropoda
- Order: Trochida
- Superfamily: Trochoidea
- Family: Trochidae
- Genus: Kanekotrochus
- Species: K. infuscatus

Binomial name
- Kanekotrochus infuscatus Gould, A.A., 1861

Synonyms
- Cantharidus infuscatus (Gould, 1861); Clelandella infuscata (Gould, 1861); Kanekotrochus yokohamensis (Bock, 1878); Thalotia yokohamaensis Donald, K.M., 1878; Trochus yokohamensis Bock, 1878; Ziziphinus infuscatus Gould, 1861 (original combination)

Species of gastropod

Kanekotrochus infuscatusis, common name the dusky jewel top shell, a species of sea snail, a marine gastropod mollusk in the family Trochidae, the top snails.

== Description ==
The size of the adult shell of this sea snail species varies between 7 mm and 16 mm.

== Distribution ==
This marine species occurs off Japan and the Philippines.
