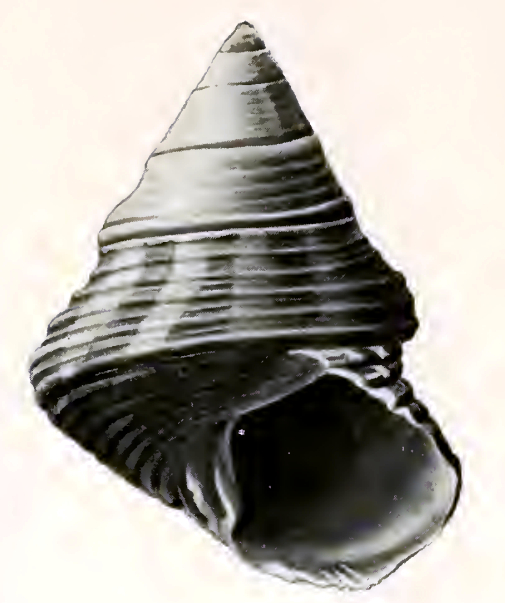
- Drawing with an apertural view of a shell of Calthalotia strigata

Scientific classification
- Kingdom: Animalia
- Phylum: Mollusca
- Class: Gastropoda
- Subclass: Vetigastropoda
- Order: Trochida
- Superfamily: Trochoidea
- Family: Trochidae
- Genus: Calthalotia
- Species: C. strigata

Binomial name
- Calthalotia strigata (A. Adams, 1853)

Synonyms
- Cantharidus mundula (Adams & Angas, 1864); Cantharidus strigatus (A. Adams, 1853); Thalotia strigata Adams, 1853 (original combination); Thalotia mundula A. Adams & Angas, 1864

= Calthalotia strigata =

Species of gastropod

Calthalotia strigata is a species of sea snail, a marine gastropod mollusk in the family Trochidae, the top snails.

== Description ==
The size of the adult shell varies between 10 mm and 23 mm. The subperforate shell has an elevated-conical shape. It is painted with longitudinal stripes of white and red or green or with longitudinal purplish flammules. The plane whorls are concave in the middle. They show at the sutures a prominent rounded ridge, transversely lirate. The lirae are equal and subgranulose. The base of the shell is concentrically lirate, with radiating striae in the interstices. The aperture is subquadrate. The lip is arcuate, ending anteriorly in an obtuse tooth. The lip is obsoletely sulcate within.

== Distribution ==
This marine species is endemic to Australia and occurs off Western Australia.
