= Calthalotia fragum =

Scientific classification
- Kingdom: Animalia
- Phylum: Mollusca
- Class: Gastropoda
- Subclass: Vetigastropoda
- Order: Trochida
- Superfamily: Trochoidea
- Family: Trochidae
- Genus: Calthalotia
- Species: C. fragum

Binomial name
- Calthalotia fragum (Iredale, 1931)

Synonyms
- Calliostoma fragum (Philippi, 1848); Calthalotia comtessa (Iredale, 1931); Odontotrochus indistinctus Wood, 1828; Prothalotia comtessei Iredale, T., 1931; Thalotia comtessei Iredale, 1931; Thalotia marginata Tenison-Woods, 1879; Thalotia zebrides A. Adams, 1853; Trochus decoratus Philippi, 1846 (invalid: junior homonym of Trochus decoratus Hehl, 1832, and T. decoratus Michelotti, 1840); Trochus fragum Philippi, 1848 (original combination); Trochus indistinctus Wood, 1828; Trochus pyrgos Philippi, 1855; Zizyphius fragum Philippi, 1848

Species of gastropod

Calthalotia fragum is the common name of the spotted strawberry top shell or the comtesse's top shell, is a species of sea snail, a marine gastropod mollusk in the family Trochidae, the top snails.

== Description ==
The size of an adult shell of this species varies between 8 mm and 25 mm.

== Distribution ==
This marine species occurs off Southeast Australia, Queensland, Victoria, New South Wales, and Japan.
