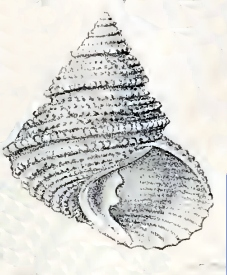
- Drawing with an apertural view of a shell of Turcica monilifera

Scientific classification
- Kingdom: Animalia
- Phylum: Mollusca
- Class: Gastropoda
- Subclass: Vetigastropoda
- Family: Eucyclidae
- Genus: Turcica; H. Adams & A. Adams, 1854

Type species
- Turcica monilifera A. Adams, 1854

Synonyms
- Ptychostylis Gabb, 1865

= Turcica =

Genus of gastropods

Turcica is a genus of sea snails, marine gastropod mollusks in the family Eucyclidae.

Kano et al. (2009) have argued that Turcica belongs in the family Calliotropidae.

== Description ==
The thin, subdiaphanous, imperforate shell has a conoidal shape. The whorls display transverse series of granules, the last rounded on the periphery. The thick columella is spirally twisted posteriorly, ending anteriorly in an obtuse, prominent point. The thin outer lip is simple and acute.

== Distribution ==
The genus ranges on both shores of the Pacific, from California and Australia northward.

== Species ==
According to the World Register of Marine Species (WoRMS) the following species are included within the genus Turcica :

- Turcica admirabilis Berry, 1969
- Turcica caffea (Gabb, 1865)
- Turcica imperialis A. Adams, 1854
- Turcica monilifera A. Adams, 1854

Species brought into synonymy

- Turcica (Perrinia) Adams, 1854: synonym of Perrinia H. Adams & A. Adams, 1854
- Turcica coreensis Pease, 1860: synonym of Turcica monilifera A. Adams, 1854
- Turcica helix Barnard, 1964: synonym of Herpetopoma helix (Barnard, 1964)
- Turcica instricta A. Adams 1864: synonym of Herpetopoma instrictum (Gould, 1849)
- Turcica konos Barnard, 1964: synonym of Perrinia konos (Barnard, 1964)
- Turcica salpinx Barnard, 1964: synonym of Clypeostoma salpinx (Barnard, 1964)
- Turcica stellata A. Adams, 1864: synonym of Perrinia stellata (A. Adams, 1864)
- † Turcica (Perrinia) waiwailevensis Ladd, 1982: synonym of Herpetopoma xeniolum (Melvill, 1918)
