= T. concinna =

T. concinna may refer to:

- Tenaturris concinna, a sea snail
- Terebra concinna, a sea snail
- Thymophylla concinna, a flowering plant
- Triglochin concinna, a circumboreal arrowgrass
- Trigonotoma concinna, a ground beetle
- Turcica concinna, a sea snail
- Turnera concinna, a flowering plant
