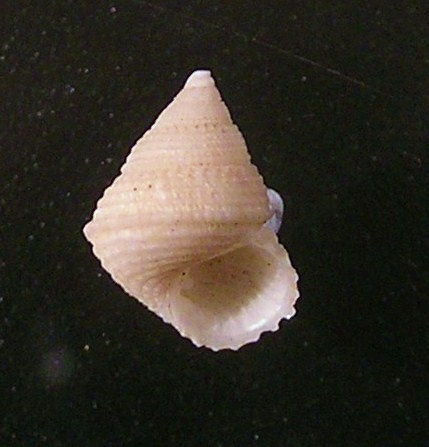
- Perrinia concinna

Scientific classification
- Kingdom: Animalia
- Phylum: Mollusca
- Class: Gastropoda
- Subclass: Vetigastropoda
- Superfamily: Seguenzioidea
- Family: Chilodontaidae
- Genus: Perrinia; H. Adams & A. Adams, 1854

Type species
- Monodonta angulifera A. Adams, 1853

Synonyms
- Calliostoma (Perrinia) H. Adams & A. Adams, 1854; Euchelus (Perrinia) H. Adams & A. Adams, 1854 (original rank); Turcica (Perrinia) Adams, 1854

= Perrinia =

Genus of gastropods

Perrinia is a genus of sea snails, marine gastropod mollusks in the family Chilodontaidae.

This genus has a long time been regarded as a subgenus of Turcica H. & A. Adams, 1854. Previously it was considered a (problematic) subgenus of Euchelus Philippi, 1847.

== Description ==
The imperforate shell is small (less than 20 mm) and has a trochiform shape. The whorls are flattened and cancellated with a strongly indented suture. The aperture is quadrangular. The outer lip is lirate (= with fine linear elevations) within. The columella is short, nearly straight, with several tubercles near the base.

== Species ==
According to the World Register of Marine Species (WoRMS) the following species are included within the genus Perrinia :

- Perrinia angulifera A. Adams, 1853
- Perrinia cantharidoides Vilvens, 2017
- Perrinia chinensis (G. B. Sowerby III, 1889)
- Perrinia concinna (A. Adams, 1864-f)
- Perrinia docili Poppe, Tagaro & Dekker, 2006
- Perrinia elisa (Gould, 1849)
- Perrinia guadalcanalensis Vilvens, 2017
- Perrinia konos (Barnard, 1964)
- Perrinia morrisoni (Ladd, 1966)
- Perrinia nigromaculata (Schepman, 1908)
- Perrinia squamicarinata (Schepman, 1908)
- Perrinia stellata (A. Adams, 1864)

Species brought into synonymy

- Perrinia cancellata (Schepman, 1908): synonym of Clypeostoma cancellatum (Schepman, 1908)
- Perrinia cecileae Poppe, Tagaro & Dekker, 2006: synonym of Clypeostoma cecileae (Poppe, Tagaro & Dekker, 2006) (original combination)
- Perrinia plicifera (Schepman, 1908): synonym of Perrinia angulifera (A. Adams, 1853)
