= Agathodonta =

Scientific classification
- Kingdom: Animalia
- Phylum: Mollusca
- Class: Gastropoda
- Subclass: Vetigastropoda
- Family: Chilodontaidae
- Genus: †Agathodonta; Cossmann, 1918

Extinct genus of gastropods

Agathodonta is a genus of sea snails, marine gastropod molluscs in the family Chilodontaidae.

They are only known as fossils.

== Species ==
Species within the genus Agathodonta include:

- †Agathodonta dentigera (Deshayes, 1842)
- Agathodonta elongata Vilvens, 2001: synonym of Clypeostoma elongatum (Vilvens, 2001)
- Agathodonta meteorae Neubert, 1998 Clypeostoma meteorae (Neubert, 1998)
- Agathodonta nortoni McLean, 1984: synonym of Clypeostoma nortoni (McLean, 1984)
