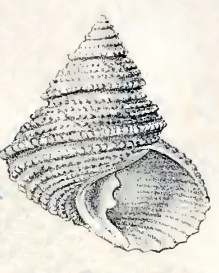
- Drawing of an apertural view of a shell of Turcica imperialis

Scientific classification
- Kingdom: Animalia
- Phylum: Mollusca
- Class: Gastropoda
- Subclass: Vetigastropoda
- Superfamily: Seguenzioidea
- Family: Eucyclidae
- Genus: Turcica
- Species: T. imperialis

Binomial name
- Turcica imperialis A. Adams 1863

Synonyms
- Trochus adamsianus Schrenck, 1867

= Turcica imperialis =

Species of gastropod

Turcica imperialis is a species of sea snail, a marine gastropod mollusk in the family Eucyclidae.

== Description ==
The solid, conoidal shell has an acuminate spire. The base is obliquely produced. Its color is tawny-red variegated, ornamented by transverse cinguli articulated with chestnut. The whorls are somewhat convex, with a strong nodulose cingulus at the periphery, and beaded lirulae alternating with elevated lines. The interstices are obliquely striate. The sutures are canaliculate. They are furnished with a series of granules above. The base of the shell is convex, furnished with concentric granulose cinguli. The oblique aperture is subcircular. The columella is tortuous, terminating in an anterior tooth. The outer lip is subexpanded, with an entire margin. The inside of the shell is smooth.

The shell is more elevated than Turcica monilifera Its base is more oblique. The aperture is more produced and the golden-nacreous appearance is wanting.

== Distribution ==
This marine species occurs off Japan.
