= T. carnea =

T. carnea may refer to:

- Terebra carnea, a sea snail
- Thelephora carnea, a wood-decay fungus
- Thelymitra carnea, a sun orchid
- Trametes carnea, a plant pathogen
