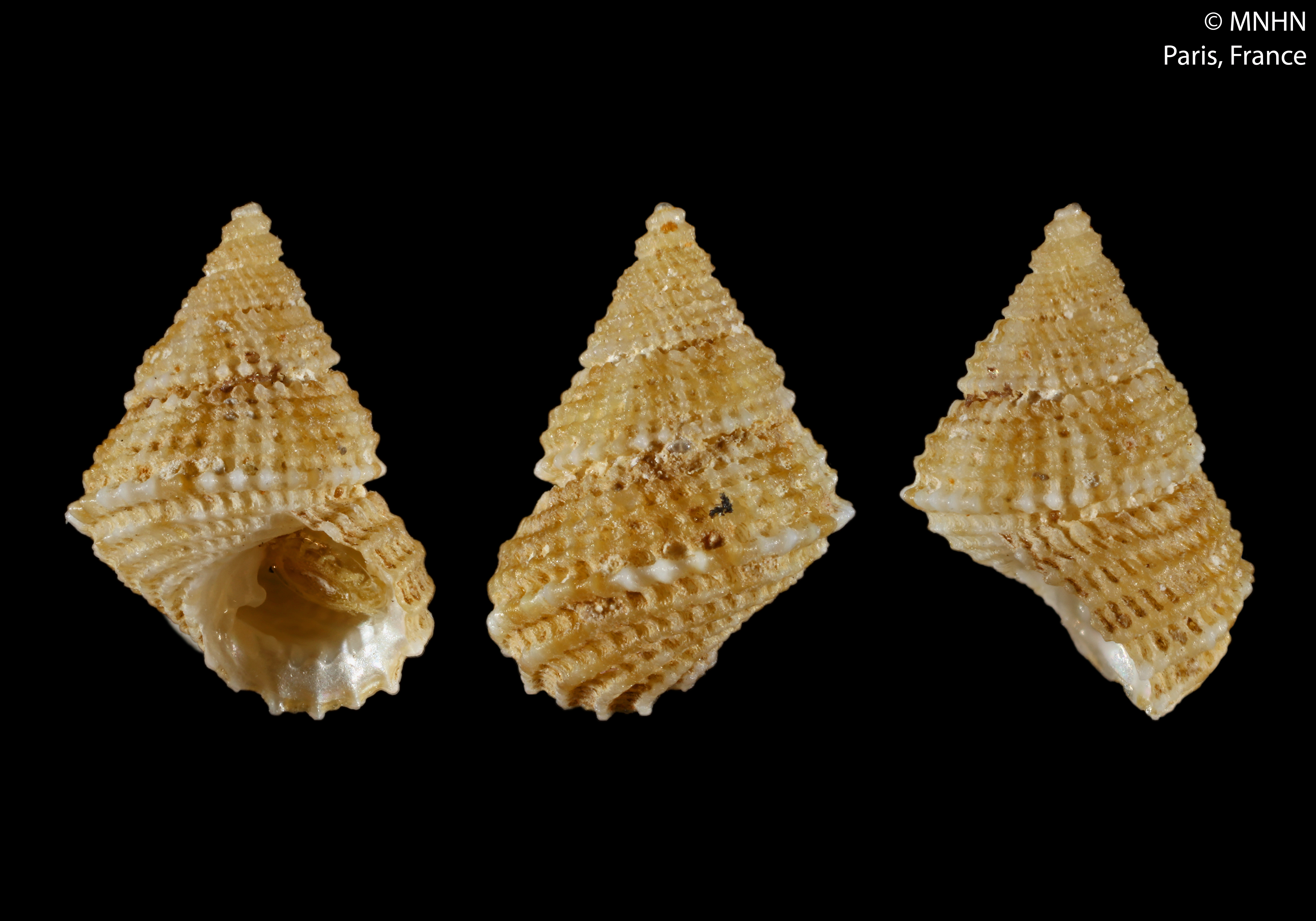
- Shell of Clypeostoma adelon (holotype at MNHN, Paris)

Scientific classification
- Kingdom: Animalia
- Phylum: Mollusca
- Class: Gastropoda
- Subclass: Vetigastropoda
- Superfamily: Seguenzioidea
- Family: Chilodontaidae
- Genus: Clypeostoma; Herbert, 2012

Type species
- Turcica salpinx Barnard, 1964

= Clypeostoma =

Genus of gastropods

Clypeostoma is a genus of mostly small deep water sea snails, marine gastropod mollusks in the family Chilodontaidae.

Species in this genus were previously categorized under the genus Agathodonta Cossmann, 1918

== Species ==
Species within the genus Clypeostoma include:

- Clypeostoma adelon Vilvens, 2017
- Clypeostoma cancellatum (Schepman, 1908)
- Clypeostoma cecileae (Poppe, Tagaro & Dekker, 2006)
- Clypeostoma chranos Vilvens, 2017
- Clypeostoma elongatum (Vilvens, 2001)
- Clypeostoma meteorae (Neubert, 1998)
- Clypeostoma nortoni (McLean, 1984)
- Clypeostoma reticulatum Herbert, 2012
- Clypeostoma salpinx (Barnard, 1964)
- Clypeostoma townsendianum (Melvill & Standen, 1903)
