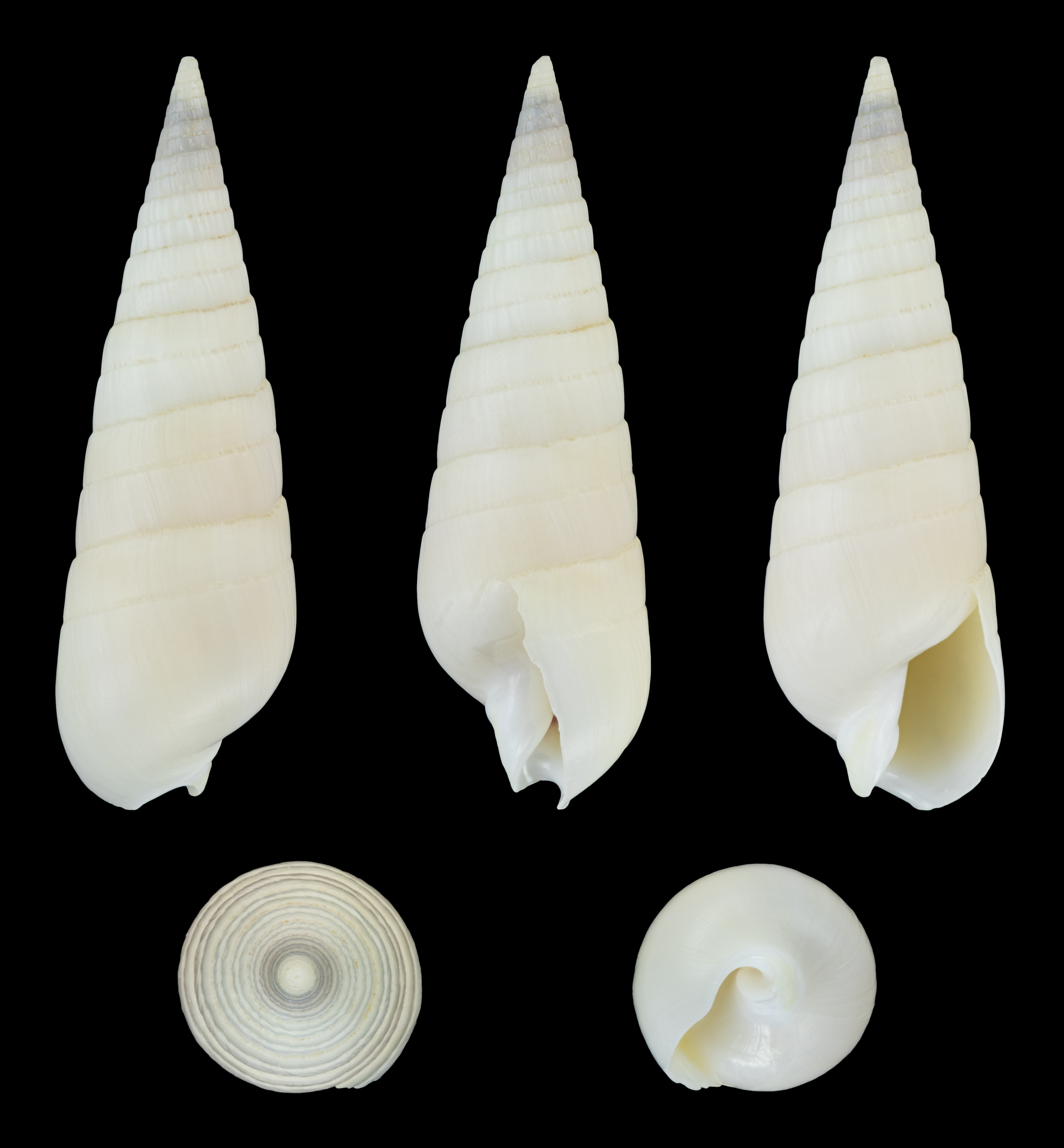

Scientific classification
- Kingdom: Animalia
- Phylum: Mollusca
- Class: Gastropoda
- Subclass: Caenogastropoda
- Order: Neogastropoda
- Family: Terebridae
- Genus: Oxymeris
- Species: O. suffusa

Binomial name
- Oxymeris suffusa (Pease, 1889)

Synonyms
- Acus suffusus (Pease, 1889)

= Oxymeris suffusa =

Species of gastropod

Oxymeris suffusa is a species of sea snail, a marine gastropod mollusc in the family Terebridae, the auger snails.

== Description ==
The length of the adult shell varies between 30 mm and 59 mm.

== Distribution ==
This species occurs in the Pacific Ocean off Hawaii.
