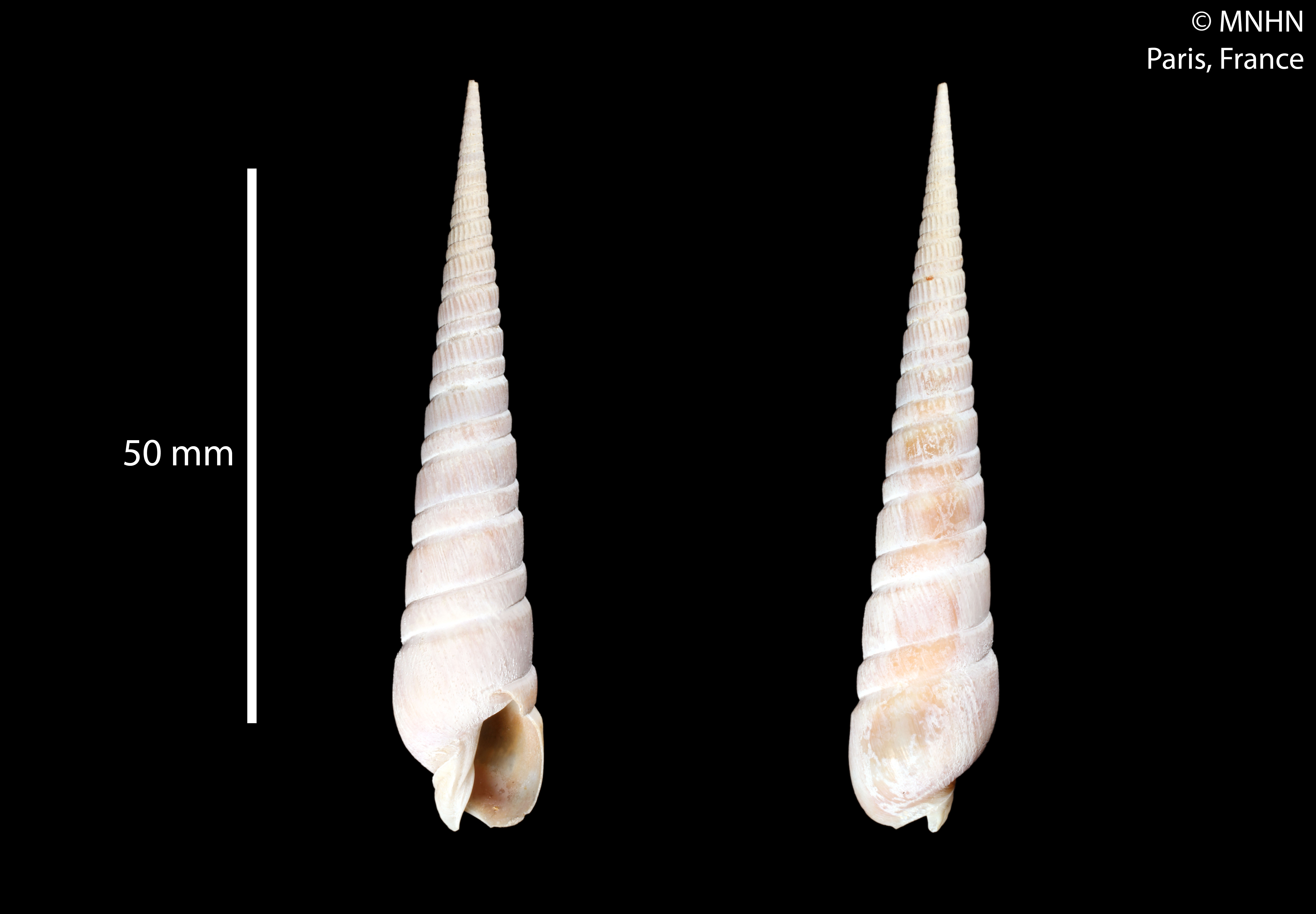
- Shell of Oxymeris trochlea (paralectotype at MNHN, Paris)

Scientific classification
- Kingdom: Animalia
- Phylum: Mollusca
- Class: Gastropoda
- Subclass: Caenogastropoda
- Order: Neogastropoda
- Family: Terebridae
- Genus: Oxymeris
- Species: O. trochlea

Binomial name
- Oxymeris trochlea (Deshayes, 1857)

Synonyms
- Acus trochlea (Deshayes, 1857); Duplicaria trochlea (Deshayes, 1857); Terebra cochlea (Deshayes, 1857); Terebra trochlea Deshayes, 1857

= Oxymeris trochlea =

Species of gastropod

Oxymeris trochlea is a species of sea snail, a marine gastropod mollusc in the family Terebridae, the auger snails.

== Description ==
The size of an adult shell varies between 40 mm and 79 mm.

== Distribution ==
This species is found in the Pacific Ocean off the Marquesas Islands.
