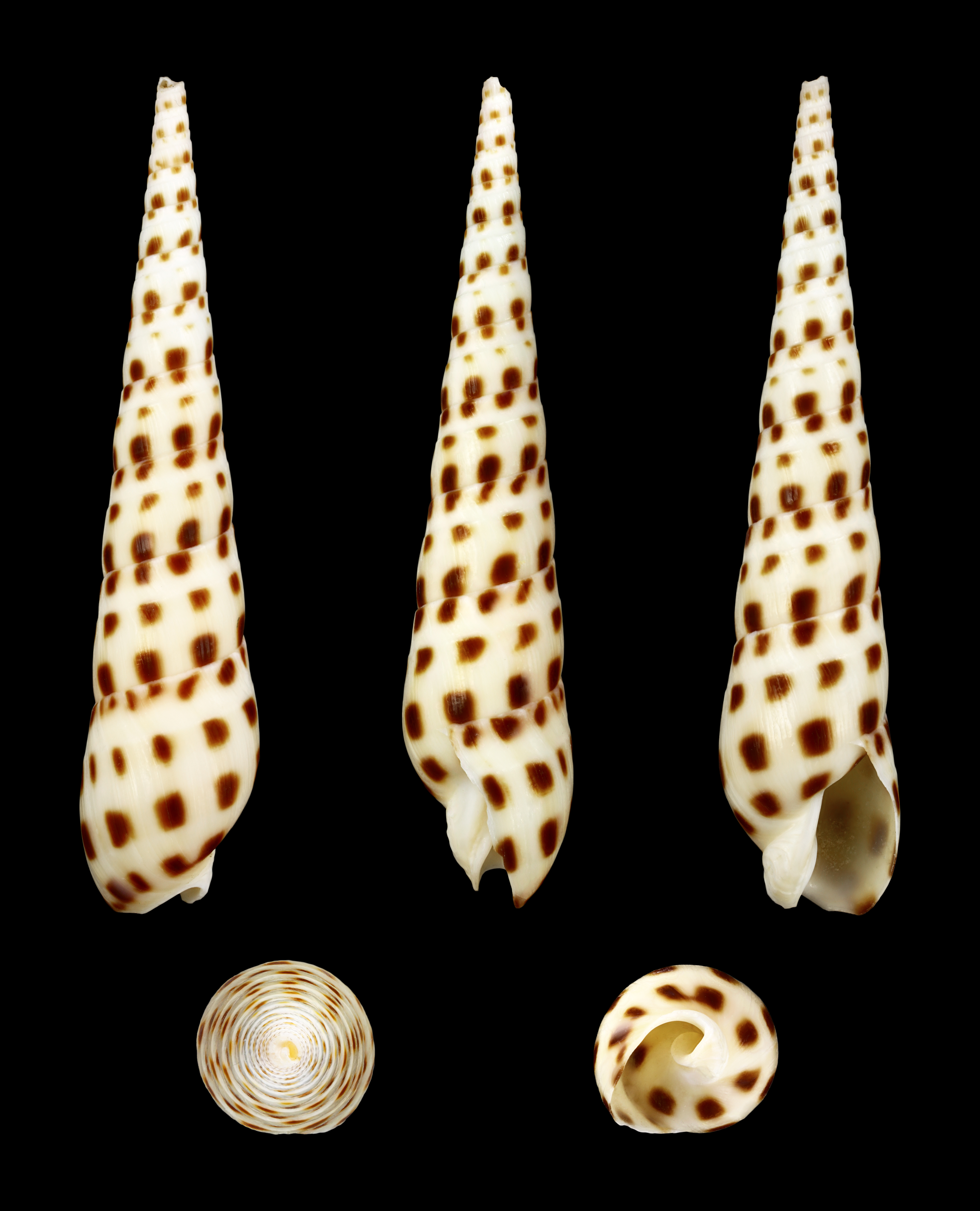

Scientific classification
- Kingdom: Animalia
- Phylum: Mollusca
- Class: Gastropoda
- Subclass: Caenogastropoda
- Order: Neogastropoda
- Family: Terebridae
- Genus: Oxymeris
- Species: O. areolata

Binomial name
- Oxymeris areolata (Link, 1807)

Synonyms
- Acus areolatus (Link, 1807); Subula areolata (Link, 1807); Terebra areolata (Link, 1807); Vertagus areolatus Link, 1807 (basionym)

= Oxymeris areolata =

Species of gastropod

Oxymeris areolata, common name the dark-spotted auger, is a species of sea snail, a marine gastropod mollusc in the family Terebridae, the auger snails.

== Description ==
The shell size varies between 65 mm and 182 mm.

== Distribution ==
This species is distributed in the Red Sea, in the Indian Ocean along Durban, South Africa, and in the Pacific Ocean along Hawaii.

== Bibliography ==
- Bratcher T. & Cernohorsky W.O. (1987). Living terebras of the world. A monograph of the recent Terebridae of the world. American Malacologists, Melbourne, Florida & Burlington, Massachusetts. 240pp
- Terryn Y. (2007). Terebridae: A Collectors Guide. Conchbooks & NaturalArt. 59pp + plates
