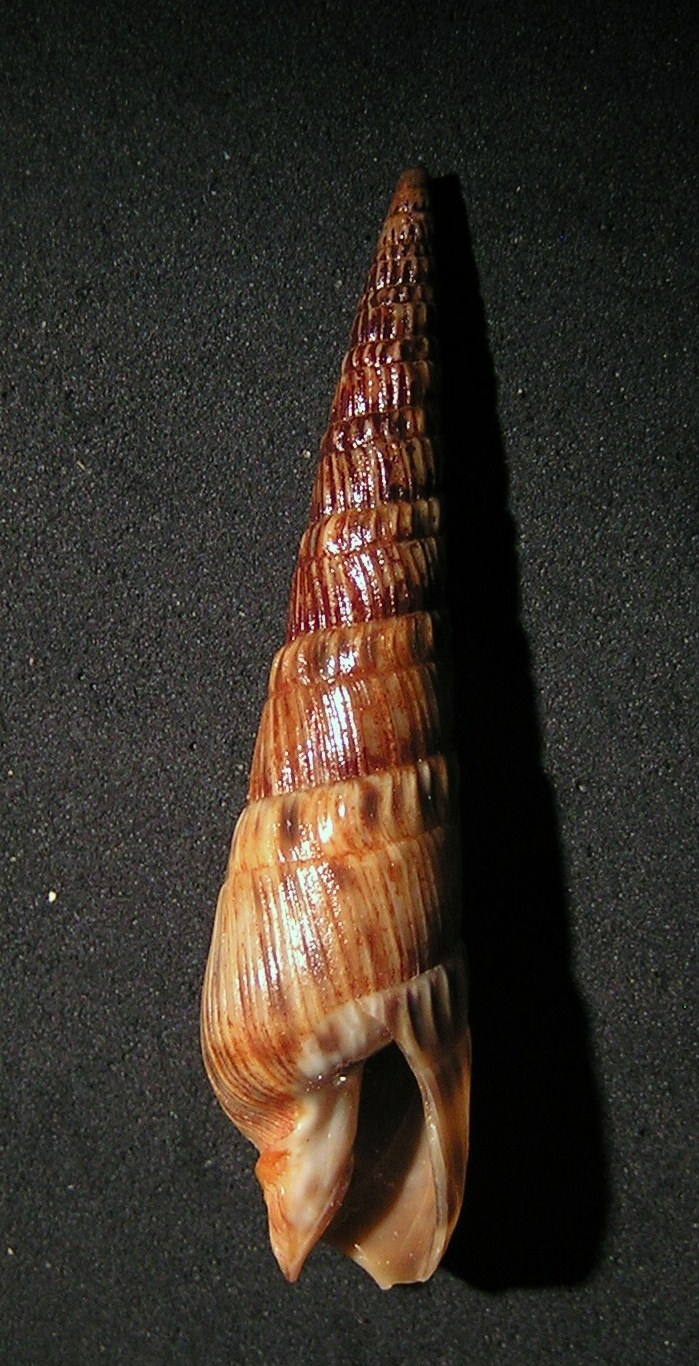
- Apertural view of Oxymeris senegalensis

Scientific classification
- Kingdom: Animalia
- Phylum: Mollusca
- Class: Gastropoda
- Subclass: Caenogastropoda
- Order: Neogastropoda
- Family: Terebridae
- Genus: Oxymeris; Dall, 1903

Type species
- Buccinum maculatum Linnaeus, 1758

Species
- See text

Synonyms
- Abretia H. Adams & A. Adams, 1853 (invalid: junior homonym of Abretia Rafinesque, 1814; Abretiella is a replacement name); Abretiella Bartsch, 1923; Acus Gray, 1847 (Invalid: junior homonym of Acus Swainson, 1839 [Pisces]; Oxymeris is a replacement name); Nototerebra Cotton, 1947; Terebra (Abretia) H. Adams & A. Adams, 1853; Terebra (Acus) Gray, 1847; Terebra (Oxymeris) Dall, 1903 (original rank)

= Oxymeris =

Genus of gastropods

Oxymeris is a genus of sea snails, marine gastropod molluscs in the family Terebridae, the auger snails.

They were historically grouped under the genus Terebra

== Species ==
Species within the genus Oxymeris include:

- Oxymeris albida (Gray, 1834)
- † Oxymeris angulosa (Tate, 1889)
- Oxymeris areolata (Link, 1807): the fly-spotted auger.
- Oxymeris barbieri (Aubry, 2008)
- † Oxymeris buiturica (Moisescu, 1955)
- Oxymeris caledonica (Sowerby III, 1909)
- Oxymeris cerithina (Lamarck, 1822)
- Oxymeris chlorata (Lamarck, 1822)
- Oxymeris consors (Hinds, 1844)
- Oxymeris crenulata (Linnaeus, 1758): the crenulated auger
- Oxymeris dillwynii (Deshayes, 1859)
- Oxymeris dimidiata (Linnaeus, 1758)
- Oxymeris fatua (Hinds, 1844)
- Oxymeris felina (Dillwyn, 1817): the tiger auger
- † Oxymeris fuscata (Brocchi, 1814)
- Oxymeris gouldi (Deshayes, 1857)
- Oxymeris lineopunctata (Bozzetti, 2008)
- Oxymeris maculata (Linnaeus, 1758): the marlinspike auger.
- † Oxymeris mitrellaeformis (Tate, 1886)
- † Oxymeris modesta (Defrance, 1829)
- Oxymeris pierredehaasi Terryn & Swinnen, 2024
- † Oxymeris platyspira (Tate, 1886)
- † Oxymeris plicaria (Basterot, 1825)
- Oxymeris senegalensis (Lamarck, 1822)
- Oxymeris soligena Terryn, 2022
- Oxymeris strigata (Sowerby I, 1825)
- Oxymeris suffusa (Pease, 1889)
- Oxymeris swinneni Terryn & Ryall, 2014
- † Oxymeris transleithana Harzhauser & Landau, 2023
- Oxymeris trochlea (Deshayes, 1857)

Species brought into synonymy

- Oxymeris costellifera (Pease, 1869): synonym of Duplicaria costellifera (Pease, 1869)
- Oxymeris ngai Thach, 2016: synonym of Oxymeris crenulata (Linnaeus, 1758) (junior subjective synonym)
- Oxymeris troendlei (Bratcher, 1981): synonym of Oxymeris felina (Dillwyn, 1817)
