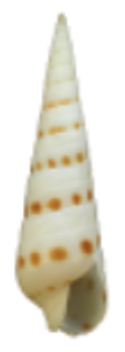
- Shell of Oxymeris felina

Scientific classification
- Kingdom: Animalia
- Phylum: Mollusca
- Class: Gastropoda
- Subclass: Caenogastropoda
- Order: Neogastropoda
- Family: Terebridae
- Genus: Oxymeris
- Species: O. felina

Binomial name
- Oxymeris felina (Dillwyn, 1817)

Synonyms
- Acus felinus (Dillwyn, 1817); Acus troendlei (Bratcher, 1981); Buccinum felinum Dillwyn, 1817; Buccinum tigrinum Gmelin, 1791; Oxymeris troendlei (Bratcher, 1981); Subula felina (Dillwyn, 1817); Terebra felina (Dillwyn, 1817); Terebra suffusa Pease, 1869; Terebra tigrina (Gmelin, 1791)

= Oxymeris felina =

Species of gastropod

Oxymeris felina, commonly known as the tiger auger, is a species of sea snail, a marine gastropod mollusc in the family Terebridae, the auger snails.

== Description ==
The shell size varies between 39 mm and 90 mm.

== Distribution ==
This species is distributed in the Indian Ocean along Aldabra, Madagascar, the Mascarene Basin and Tanzania; in the Pacific Ocean off the Hawaiian Islands and the Marquesas Islands.
