= Clypeostoma townsendianum =

Scientific classification
- Kingdom: Animalia
- Phylum: Mollusca
- Class: Gastropoda
- Subclass: Vetigastropoda
- Family: Chilodontaidae
- Genus: Clypeostoma
- Species: C. townsendianum

Binomial name
- Clypeostoma townsendianum (Melvill & Standen, 1903)

Synonyms
- Euchelus townsendianus Melvill & Standen, 1903

Species of gastropod

Clypeostoma townsendianum is a species of sea snail, a marine gastropod mollusc in the family Chilodontaidae.

== Description ==
The length of the shell attains 2 mm.

== Distribution ==
This species occurs in the Gulf of Oman and in the Indian Ocean off Réunion.
