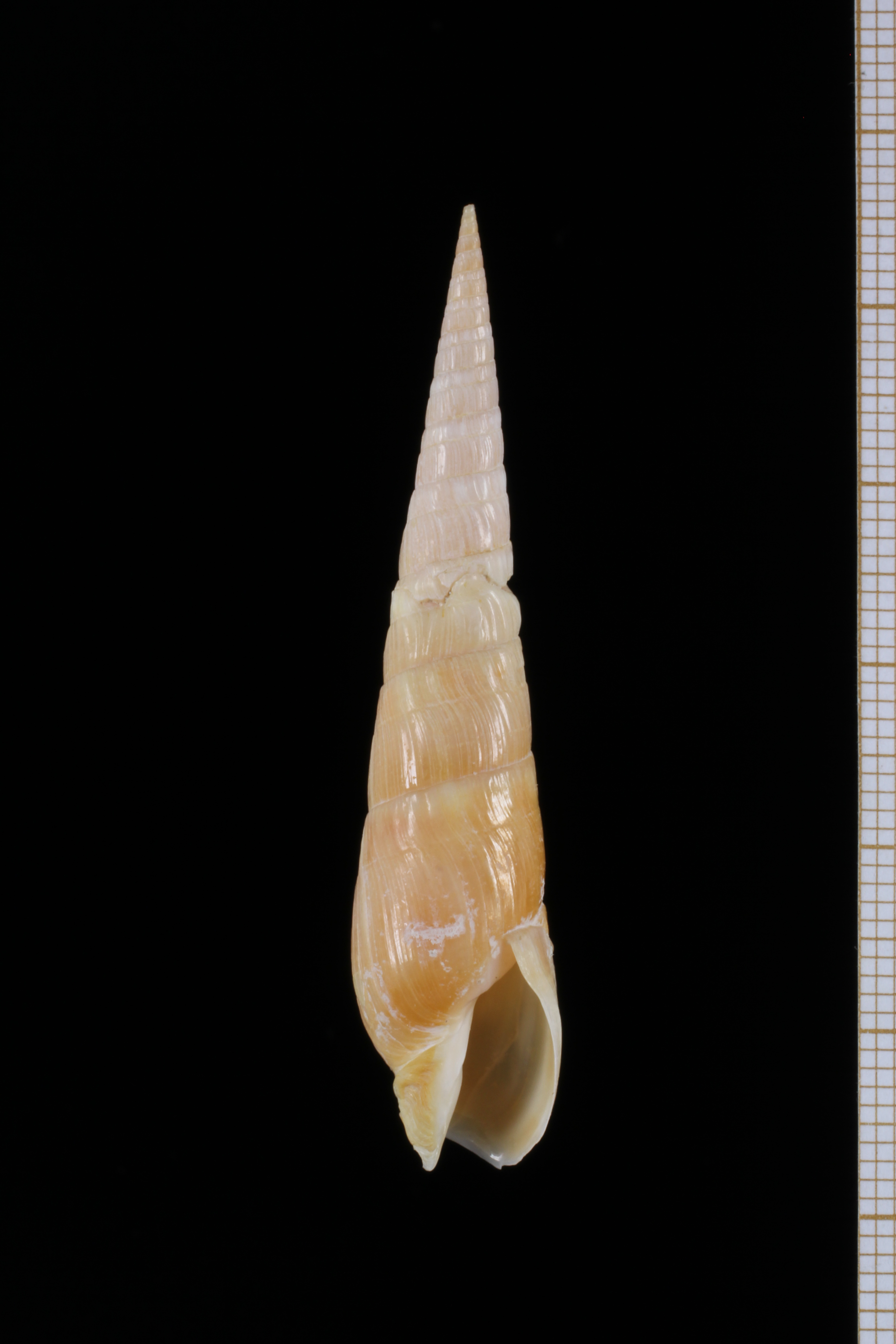

Scientific classification
- Kingdom: Animalia
- Phylum: Mollusca
- Class: Gastropoda
- Subclass: Caenogastropoda
- Order: Neogastropoda
- Family: Terebridae
- Genus: Oxymeris
- Species: O. caledonica

Binomial name
- Oxymeris caledonica (G.B. Sowerby III, 1909)

Synonyms
- Acus caledonicus (G.B. Sowerby III, 1909); Terebra caledonica G.B. Sowerby III, 1909

= Oxymeris caledonica =

Species of gastropod

Oxymeris caledonica is a species of sea snail, a marine gastropod mollusc in the family Terebridae, the auger snails.

== Description ==
The length of the shell varies between 40 mm and 75 mm.

== Distribution ==
This species occurs off New Caledonia.
