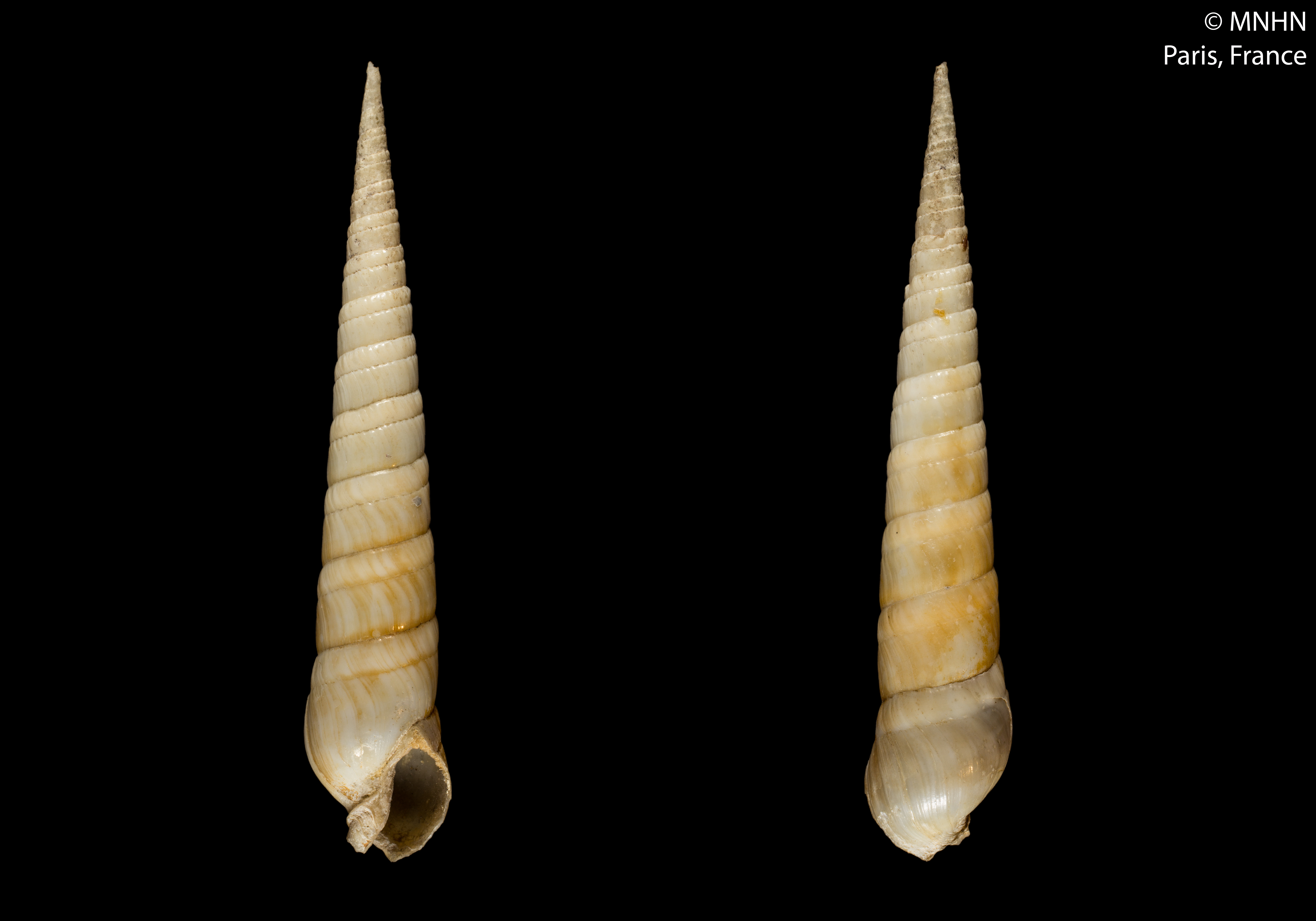
- Shell of Oxymeris consors (lectotype at MNHN, Paris)

Scientific classification
- Kingdom: Animalia
- Phylum: Mollusca
- Class: Gastropoda
- Subclass: Caenogastropoda
- Order: Neogastropoda
- Family: Terebridae
- Genus: Oxymeris
- Species: O. consors

Binomial name
- Oxymeris consors (Hinds, 1844)

Synonyms
- Terebra consors Hinds, 1844 (original combination); Terebra glabra Deshayes, 1857; Terebra virginea Deshayes, 1857

= Oxymeris consors =

Species of gastropod

Oxymeris consors is a species of sea snail, a marine gastropod mollusc in the family Terebridae, the auger snails.

== Distribution ==
This marine species occurs off Tahiti
