= Turcica caffea =

Scientific classification
- Kingdom: Animalia
- Phylum: Mollusca
- Class: Gastropoda
- Subclass: Vetigastropoda
- Superfamily: Seguenzioidea
- Family: Eucyclidae
- Genus: Turcica
- Species: T. caffea

Binomial name
- Turcica caffea (Gabb, 1865)

Species of gastropod

Turcica caffea, common name the two tooth top shell, is a species of sea snail, a marine gastropod mollusk in the family Eucyclidae.

== Description ==
The height of the shell attains 20 mm.
