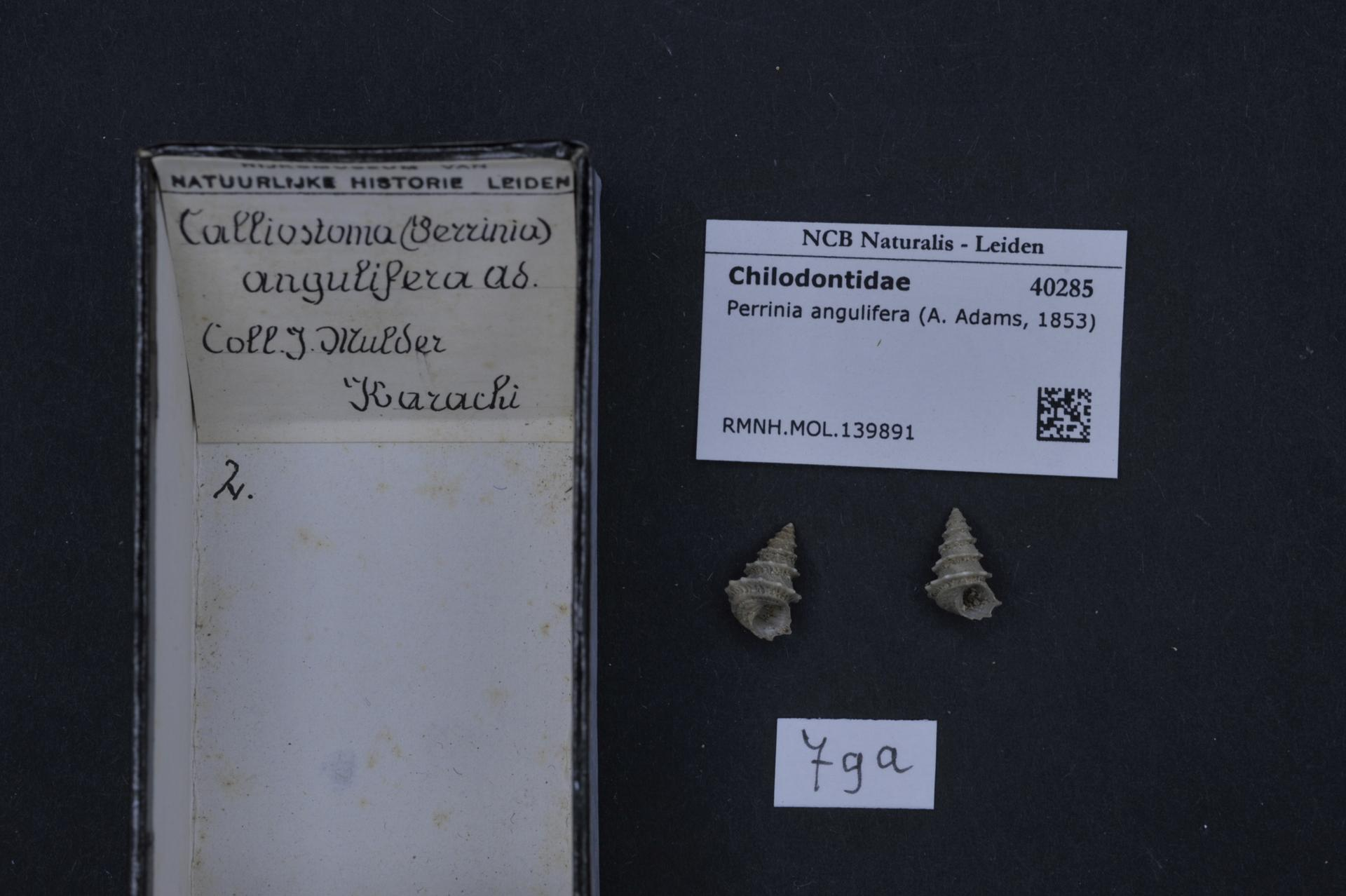

Scientific classification
- Kingdom: Animalia
- Phylum: Mollusca
- Class: Gastropoda
- Subclass: Vetigastropoda
- Family: Chilodontaidae
- Genus: Perrinia
- Species: P. angulifera

Binomial name
- Perrinia angulifera (A. Adams, 1853)

Synonyms
- Calliostoma anguliferum Hidalgo 1904; Cantharidus pliciferus Schepman, 1908; Monodonta angulifera A. Adams, 1853 (original combination); Perrinia plicifera (Schepman, 1908); Tectaria montrouzieri P. Fischer, 1878; Trochus (Perrinia) angulifera (A. Adams, 1853); Turcica concinna [non A. Adams, 1863]; Turcica montrouzieri Hedley 1909; Turcica (Perrinia)angulifera Melvill 1928

= Perrinia angulifera =

Species of gastropod

Perrinia angulifera is a species of sea snail, a marine gastropod mollusc in the family Chilodontaidae.

== Description ==
The size of the shell varies between 5 mm and 26 mm. The imperforate shell has an elevated-conoidal shape. The nearly plane whorls are imbricated and angulated below. They are longitudinally nodose-costate, and ornamented with transverse girdles of subdistant tubercles. The interstices are channelled. The body whorl is subangulate. The columella is straight and short. It terminates in a small tooth. The outer lip is subduplicate and sulcate inside.

== Distribution ==
This marine species occurs in the Philippines and the Gulf of Oman.
