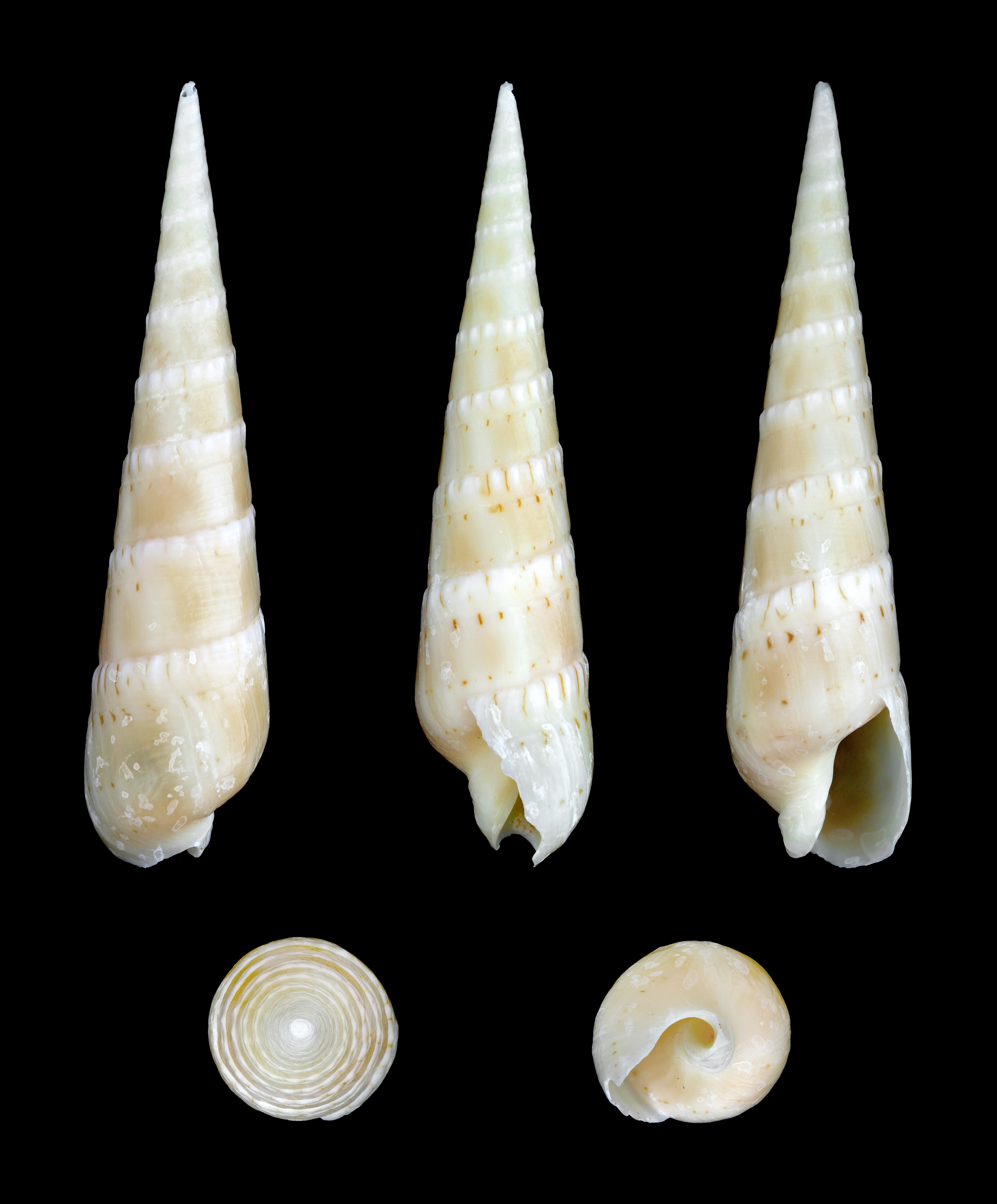
- Five views of a shell of Oxymeris crenulata

Scientific classification
- Kingdom: Animalia
- Phylum: Mollusca
- Class: Gastropoda
- Subclass: Caenogastropoda
- Order: Neogastropoda
- Family: Terebridae
- Genus: Oxymeris
- Species: O. crenulata

Binomial name
- Oxymeris crenulata (Linnaeus, 1758)

Synonyms
- Acus crenulatus (Linnaeus, 1758); Buccinum crenulatum Linnaeus, 1758 (basionym); Buccinum luteolum Chenu, 1845; Buccinum varicosum Gmelin, 1791; Subula crenulata (Linnaeus, 1758); Terebra crenulata (Linnaeus, 1758); Terebra crenulata var. booleyi Melvill & Sykes, 1898; Terebra fimbriata Deshayes, 1857; Terebra interlineata Deshayes, 1859; Terebra maculata Perry, 1811

= Oxymeris crenulata =

Species of gastropod

Oxymeris crenulata, common name crenulate auger, is a species of sea snail, a marine gastropod mollusc in the family Terebridae, the auger snails.

The shell of this species has crenulations along the suture, hence the specific name.

== Description ==
Adult shell size varies between 48 mm and 154 mm.

The ovate, conical shell is whitish, ashy or reddish, often with two brown bands which are sometimes interrupted. The spire is formed of seven or eight distinct whorls, flattened above, furnished with longitudinal, almost perpendicular folds, which are themselves intersected by striae visible only in the interstices of the folds, except towards the base, and upon the whorls at the top of the spire. The upper edge of the whorls is flattened, and bordered by rounded tubercles, which are separated from the longitudinal folds by a deep stria running below them. The ovate aperture is whitish, contracted at the top by a transverse fold of the left lip. The outer lip is emarginated at its upper edge, marked interiorly with transverse striae in great numbers. The left lip is obliterated and flattened at its summit. It gives rise from the middle to the base to a pretty thick, projecting callosity, in the form of a keel.

This species presents a great number of varieties. In young specimens the color is deeper. The transverse brown bands are more marked, and appear upon all the whorls. The shell has also, proportionally, a more globular form. Other specimens are of a uniform color, have the whorls strongly canaliculated, and the longitudinal folds more approximate.

== Distribution ==
This species is found in the Red Sea and in the Indian Ocean off Aldabra, Chagos, Madagascar, the Mascarene Basin and Tanzania, and in the Pacific Ocean off Mexico.
