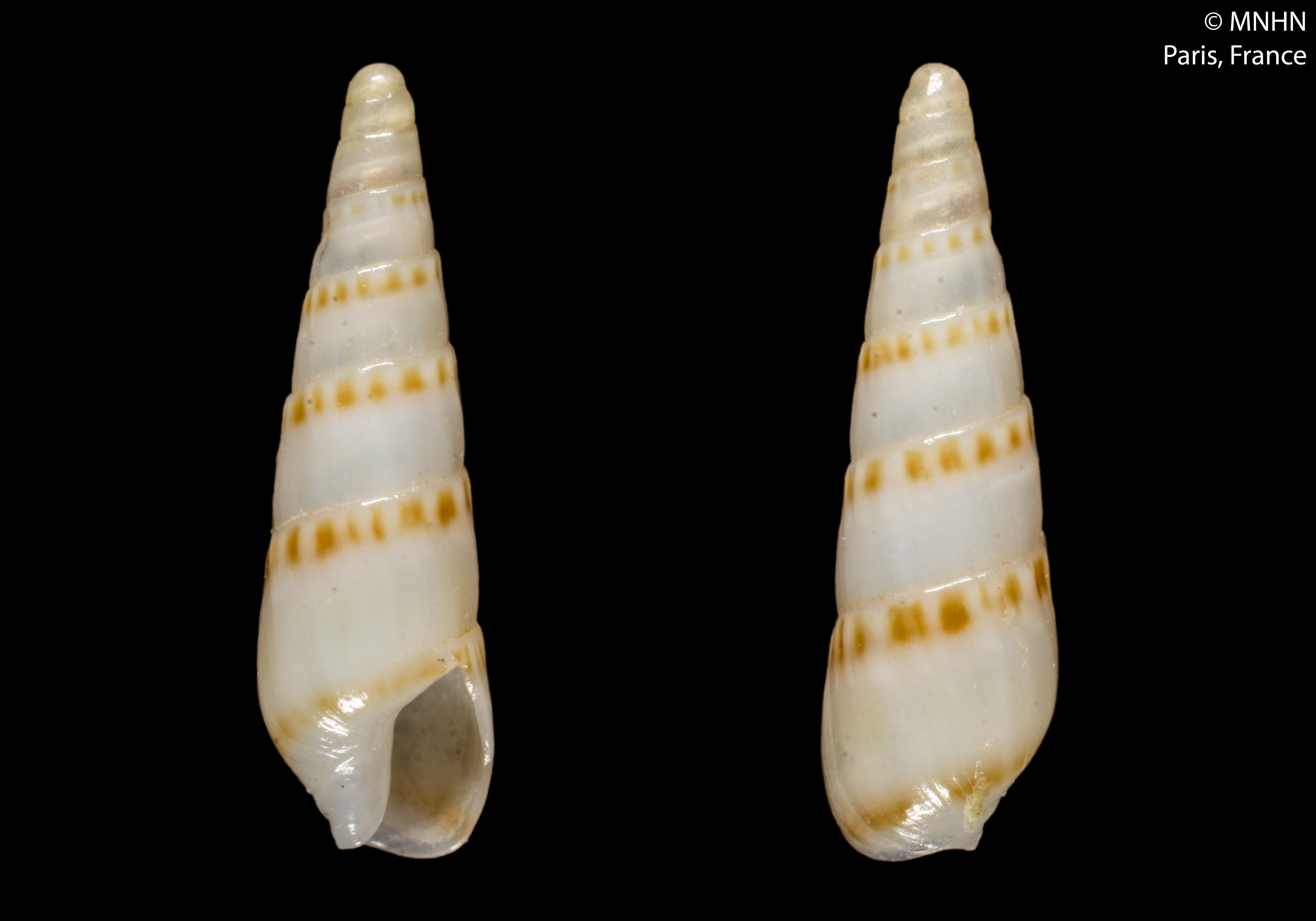
- Shell of Oxymeris lineopunctata (specimen at MNHN, Paris)

Scientific classification
- Kingdom: Animalia
- Phylum: Mollusca
- Class: Gastropoda
- Subclass: Caenogastropoda
- Order: Neogastropoda
- Family: Terebridae
- Genus: Oxymeris
- Species: O. lineopunctata

Binomial name
- Oxymeris lineopunctata (Bozzetti, 2008)

Synonyms
- Acus lineopunctatus Bozzetti, 2008; Hastula lineopunctata (Bozzetti, 2008)

= Oxymeris lineopunctata =

Species of sea snail

Oxymeris lineopunctata is a species of sea snail, a marine gastropod mollusk in the family Terebridae, the auger snails.

== Description ==
The maximum length of the shell is 7.4 mm.

== Distribution ==
This marine species occurs off Madagascar.
