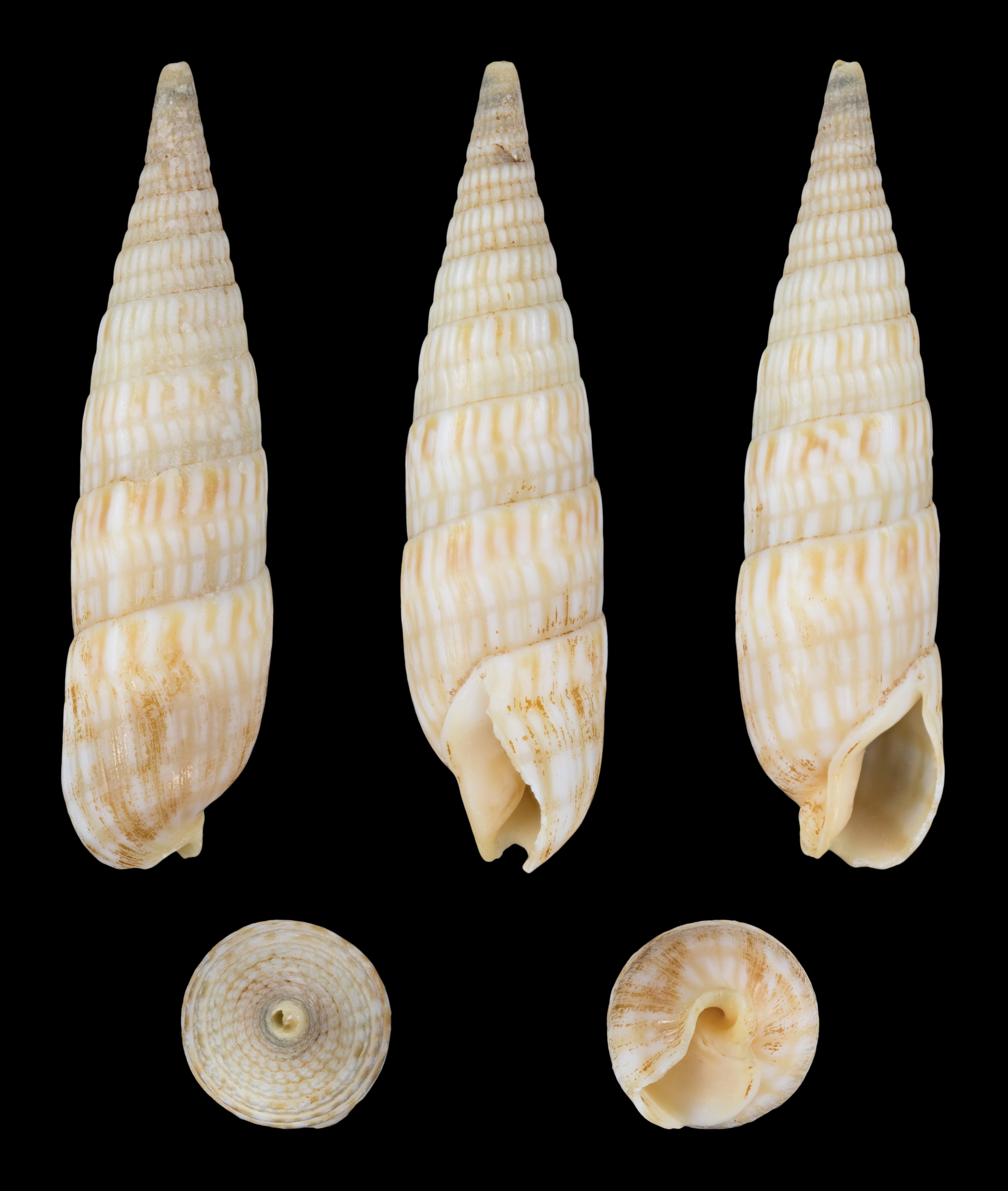

Scientific classification
- Kingdom: Animalia
- Phylum: Mollusca
- Class: Gastropoda
- Subclass: Caenogastropoda
- Order: Neogastropoda
- Family: Terebridae
- Genus: Oxymeris
- Species: O. cerithina

Binomial name
- Oxymeris cerithina (Lamarck, 1822)

Synonyms
- Perirhoe cerithina (Lamarck, 1822); Terebra cerithina Lamarck, 1822 (basionym); Terebra cerithina spaldingi (Pilsbry, 1921); Terebra pulchra Hinds, 1844; Terebra spaldingi Pilsbry, 1921

= Oxymeris cerithina =

Species of gastropod

Oxymeris cerithina is a species of sea snail, a marine gastropod mollusk in the family Terebridae, the auger snails.

== Distribution ==
This species occurs in the Red Sea and in the Indian Ocean off Tanzania, Aldabra, Chagos, and the Mascarene Basin; also off Papua New Guinea.
