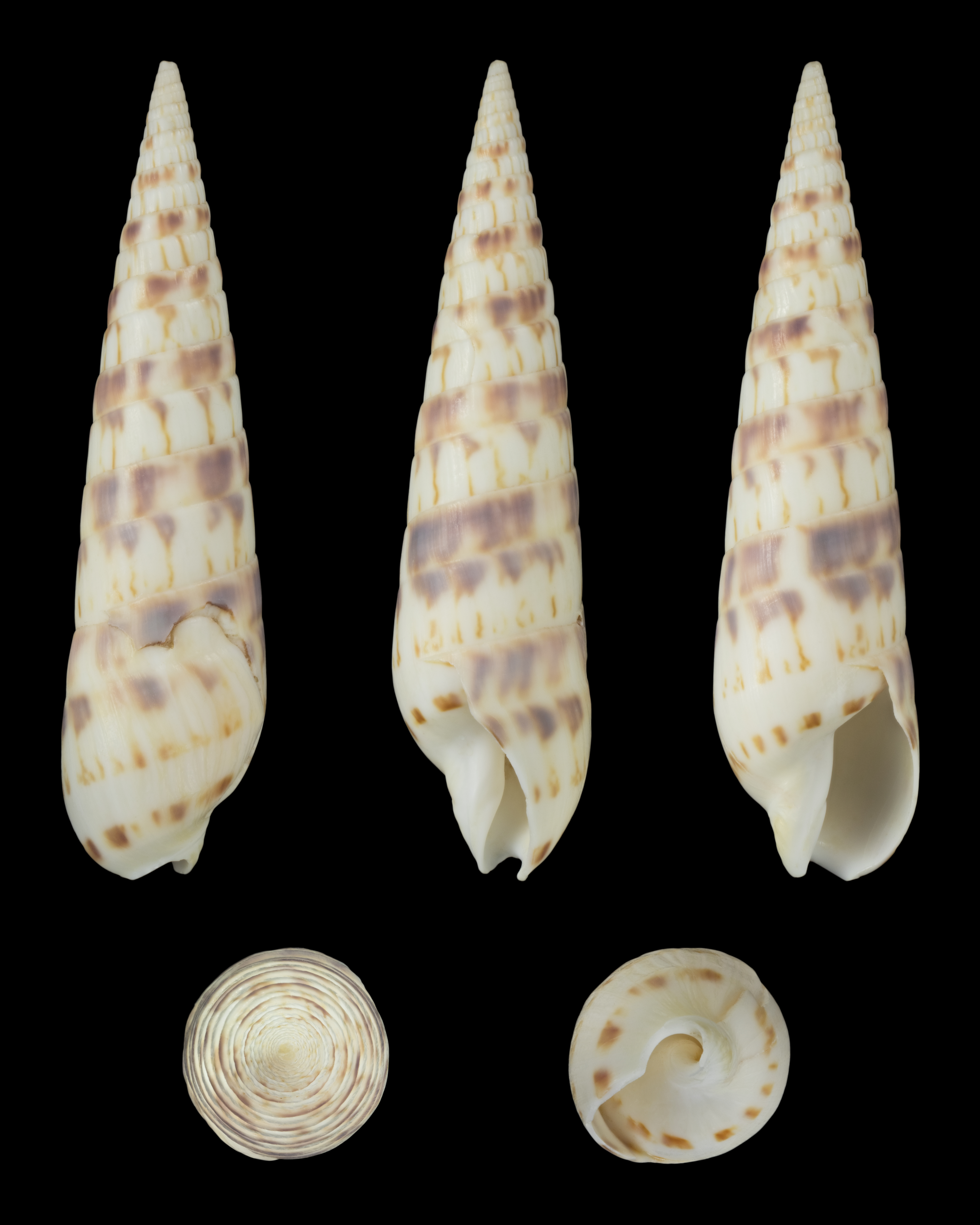
- Shell of Oxymeris chlorata

Scientific classification
- Kingdom: Animalia
- Phylum: Mollusca
- Class: Gastropoda
- Subclass: Caenogastropoda
- Order: Neogastropoda
- Family: Terebridae
- Genus: Oxymeris
- Species: O. chlorata

Binomial name
- Oxymeris chlorata (Lamarck, 1822)

Synonyms
- Acus chlorata (Lamarck, 1822) (wrong gender agreement of specific epithet); Acus chloratus (Lamarck, 1822); Subula chlorata (Lamarck, 1822); Terebra chlorata Lamarck, 1822; Terebra knorrii Gray, 1834

= Oxymeris chlorata =

Species of gastropod

Oxymeris chlorata, common name : the pink-spotted auger, is a species of sea snail, a marine gastropod mollusc in the family Terebridae, the auger snails.

== Description ==
The shell size varies between 50 mm and 100 mm.

== Distribution ==
This species occurs in the Indian Ocean off Chagos, Madagascar, the Mascarene Basin and Tanzania; in the Pacific Ocean off Pitcairn and Hawaii; also off Papua New Guinea.
