= Oxymeris barbieri =

Scientific classification
- Kingdom: Animalia
- Phylum: Mollusca
- Class: Gastropoda
- Subclass: Caenogastropoda
- Order: Neogastropoda
- Family: Terebridae
- Genus: Oxymeris
- Species: O. barbieri

Binomial name
- Oxymeris barbieri (Aubry, 2008)

Synonyms
- Terebra barbieri Aubry, 2008 (original combination)

Species of gastropod

Oxymeris barbieri is a species of sea snail, a marine gastropod mollusc in the family Terebridae, the auger snails.
