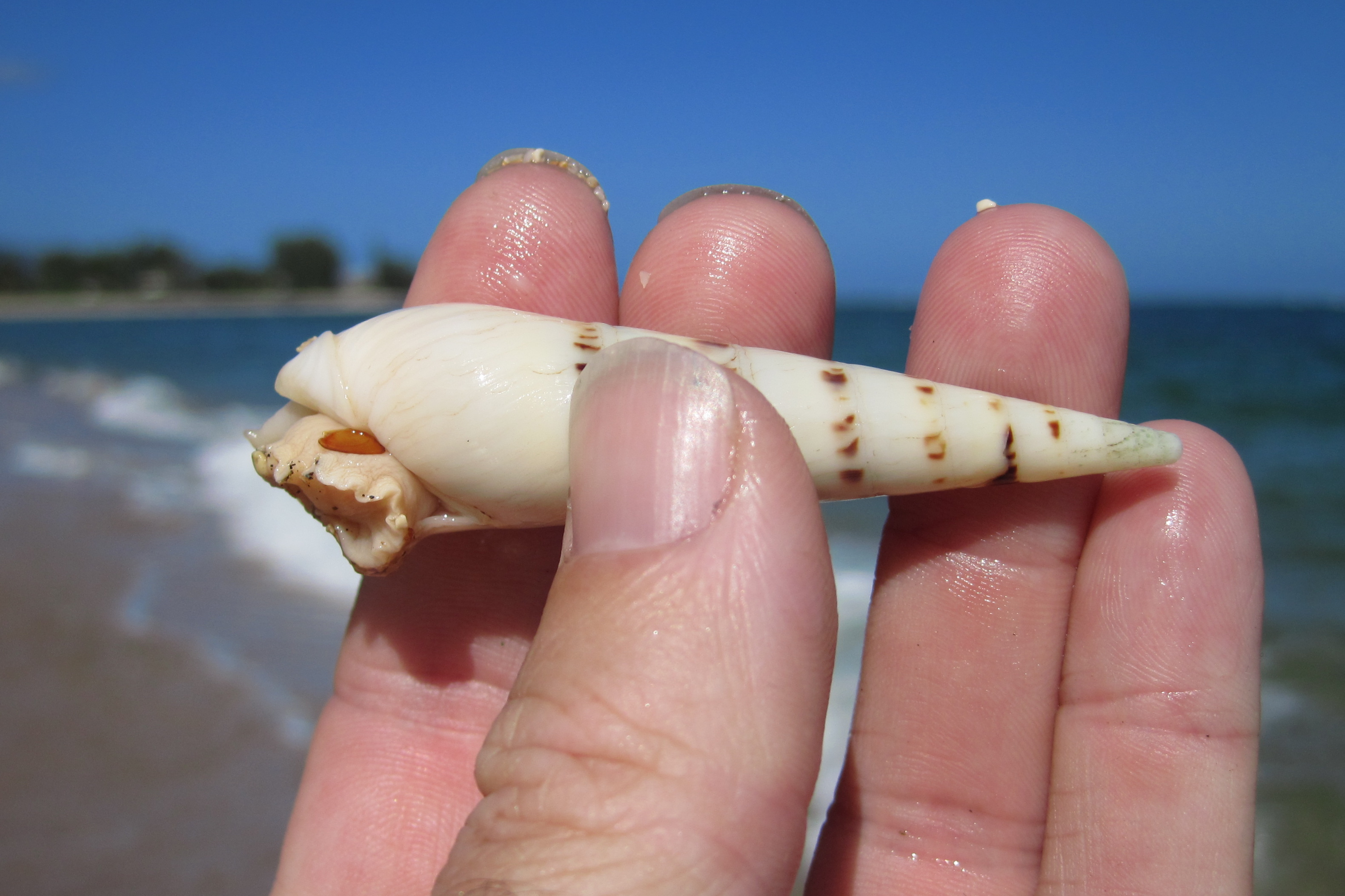
- Live Oxymeris maculata
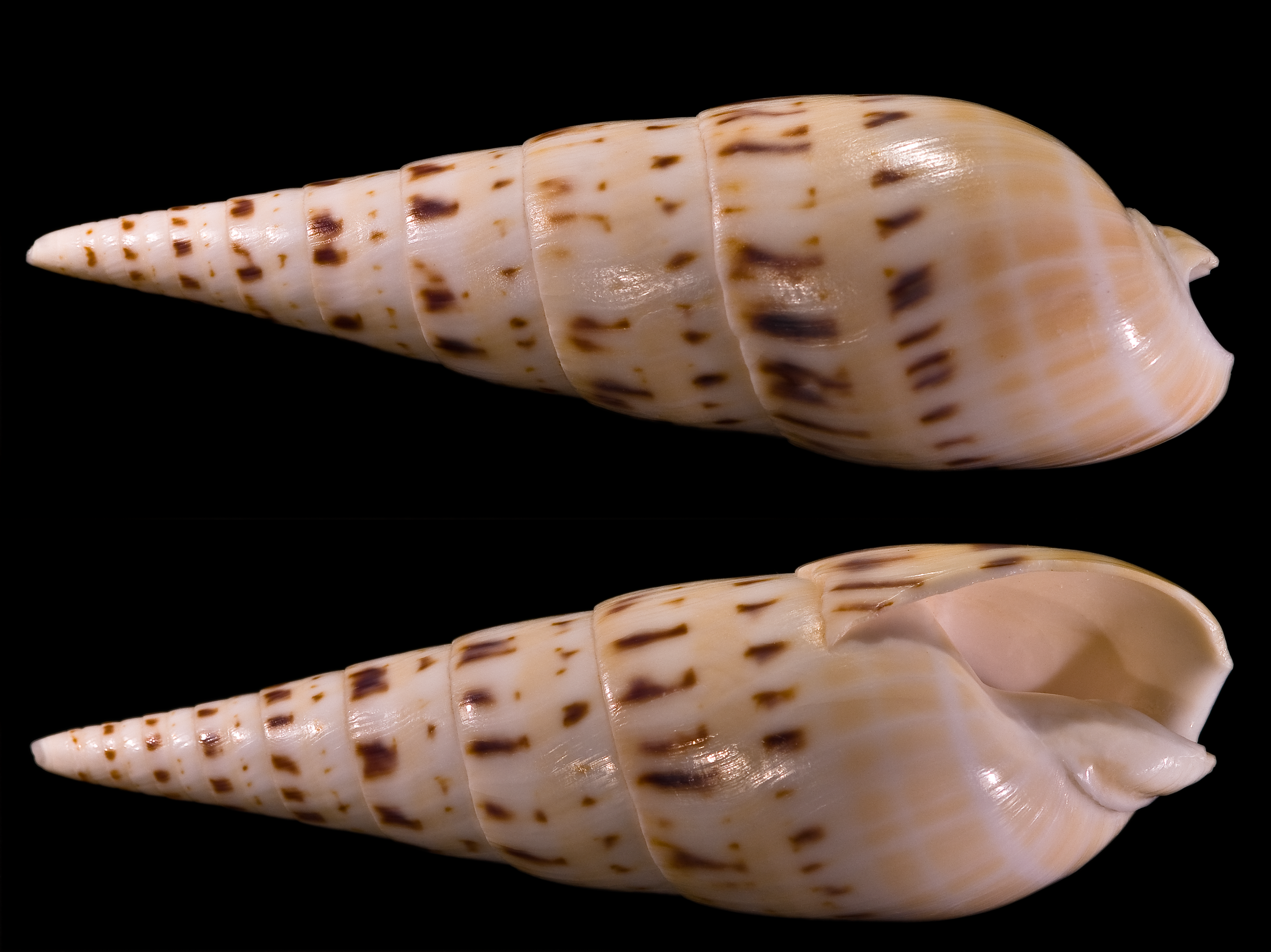
- Shells of Oxymeris maculata

Scientific classification
- Kingdom: Animalia
- Phylum: Mollusca
- Class: Gastropoda
- Subclass: Caenogastropoda
- Order: Neogastropoda
- Family: Terebridae
- Genus: Oxymeris
- Species: O. maculata

Binomial name
- Oxymeris maculata (Linnaeus, 1758)

Synonyms
- Acus maculata (Linnaeus, 1758); Acus maculatus (Linnaeus, 1758); Buccinum luteolum Chenu, 1845; Buccinum maculatum Linnaeus, 1758; Buccinum varicosum Gmelin, 1791; Subula maculata (Linnaeus, 1758); Terebra maculata (Linnaeus, 1758); Terebra maculata confluens Dautzenberg, 1935; Terebra maculata roosevelti Bartsch & Rehder, 1970; Terebra maculosa Pfeiffer, 1840; Terebra roosevelti Bartsch & Rehder, 1939; Vertagus maculatus (Linnaeus, 1758)

= Oxymeris maculata =

Species of gastropod

Oxymeris maculata, also called marlinspike auger, is a species of sea snail, a marine gastropod mollusc in the family Terebridae, the auger snails. It can be found in tropical climates at depths of 0 to 210 meters.

== Description ==
Oxymeris maculata has a cream colored shell with dark, rectangular spots that span the spiral. It is the largest Terebrid species, with an average shell height of 16 centimeters and reaching up to 27.4 centimeters. This species feeds on smaller gastropods and echinoderms, including the Crown of Thorns sea star and polychaete worms. It is one of the many species within the Terebridae family to lose its venom ducts.

== Distribution and habitat ==
Oxymeris maculata can be found in the tropical Indo-Pacific, such as off Aldabra, Chagos, Madagascar, the Mascarene Basin, Mauritius and Tanzania. This species can also be found in the Pacific Ocean off Mexico, Papua New Guinea, and Hawaii. In Hawaii it can be found off the beaches in places such as Waimānalo, Kahe Point, and Honokōhau.

== Human use ==
Oxymeris maculata is sometimes collected to eat the snail inside the shell. It has also been used as a boring tool in South Pacific cultures. Its common name, marlinspike, comes from its shape that is similar to the nautical tool used for splicing ropes.
