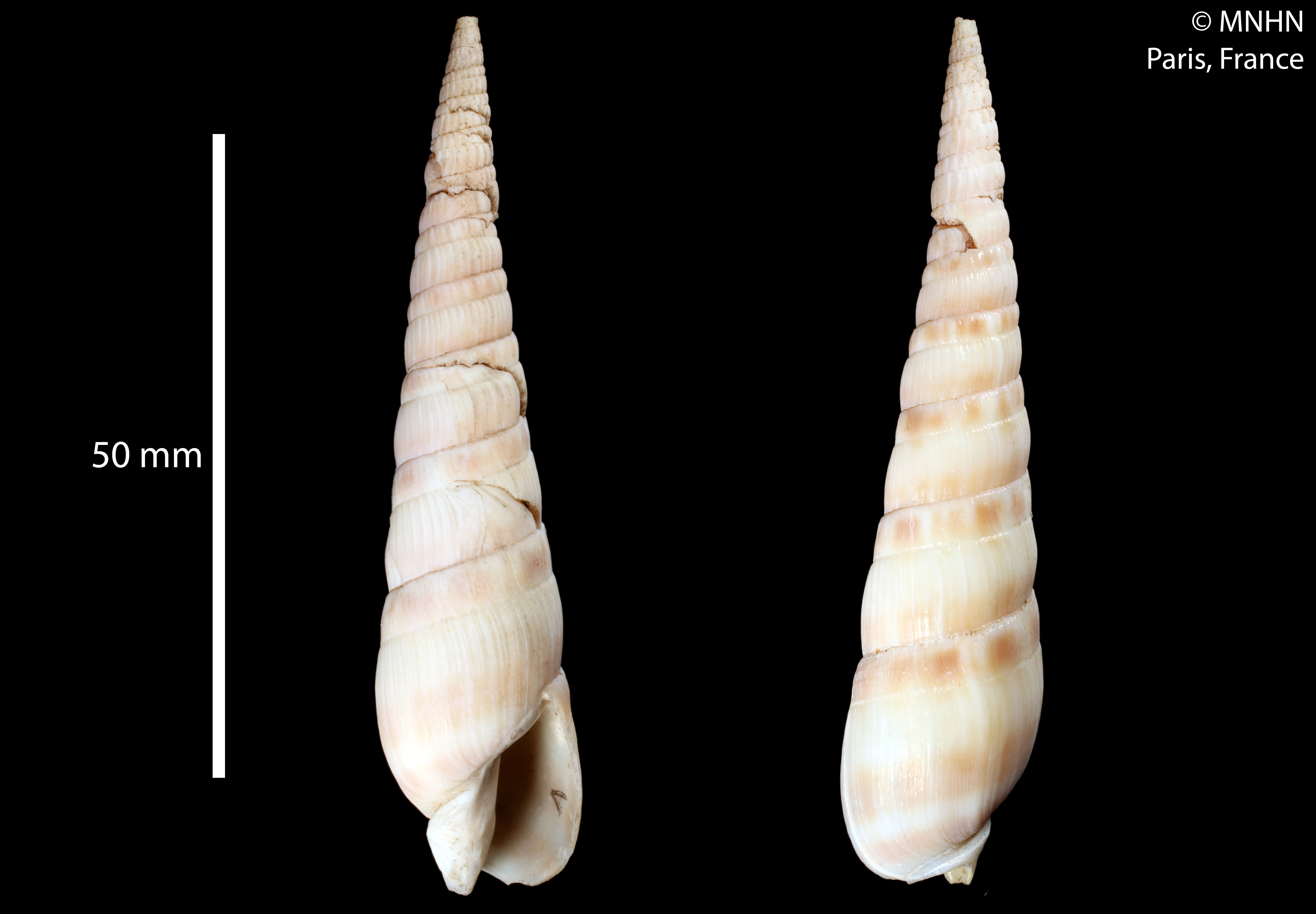

Scientific classification
- Kingdom: Animalia
- Phylum: Mollusca
- Class: Gastropoda
- Subclass: Caenogastropoda
- Order: Neogastropoda
- Family: Terebridae
- Genus: Oxymeris
- Species: O. gouldi

Binomial name
- Oxymeris gouldi (Deshayes, 1857)

Synonyms
- Duplicaria gouldi (Deshayes, 1857); Terebra gouldi Deshayes, 1857 (basionym)

= Oxymeris gouldi =

Species of gastropod

Oxymeris gouldi is a species of sea snail, a marine gastropod mollusc in the family Terebridae, the auger snails.

== Distribution ==
This marine species occurs off Hawaii.
