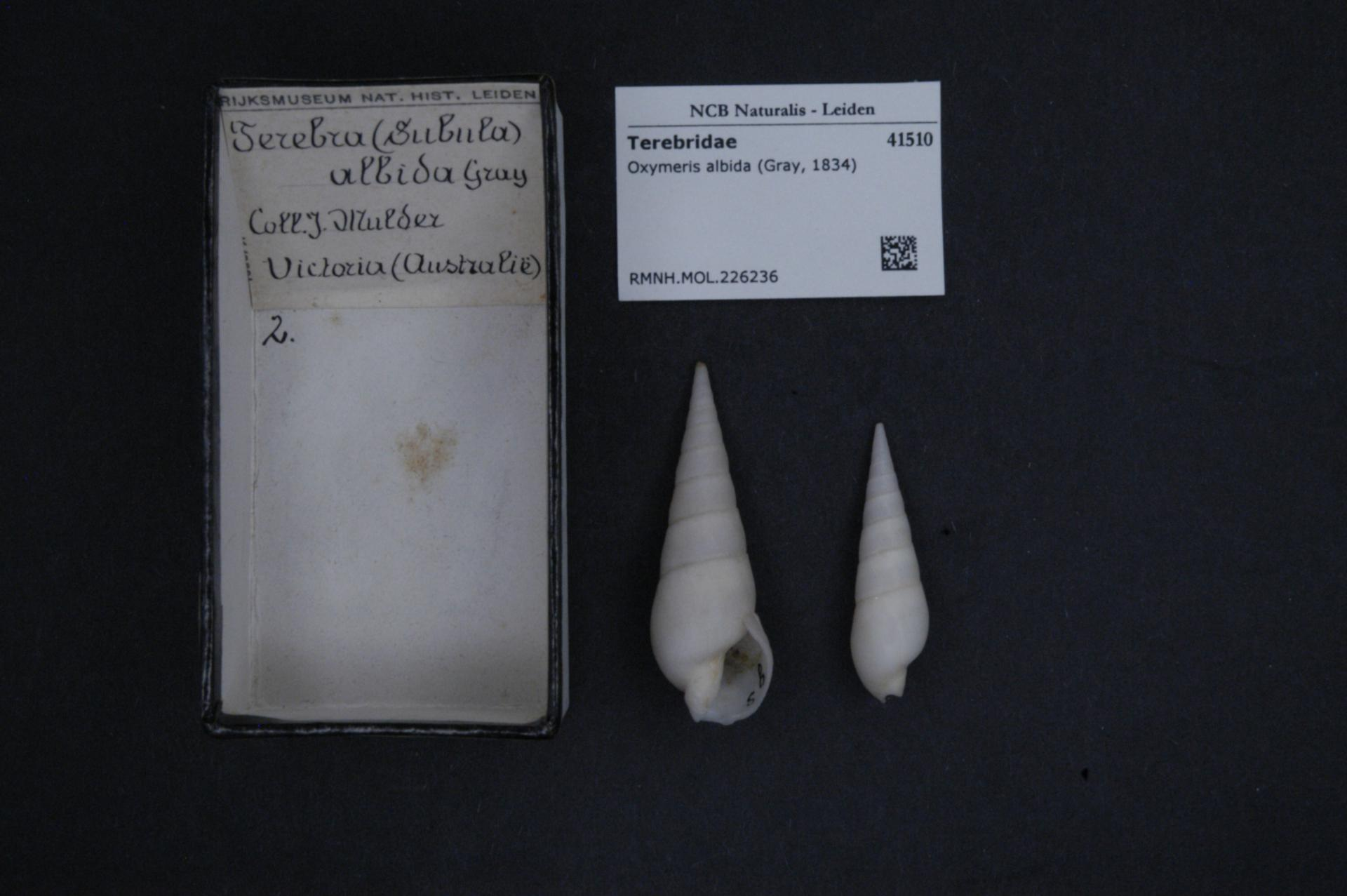

Scientific classification
- Kingdom: Animalia
- Phylum: Mollusca
- Class: Gastropoda
- Subclass: Caenogastropoda
- Order: Neogastropoda
- Family: Terebridae
- Genus: Oxymeris
- Species: O. albida

Binomial name
- Oxymeris albida (Gray, 1834)

Synonyms
- Acus albidus (Gray, 1834); Nototerebra albida (Gray, 1834); Nototerebra flindersi Cotton, 1952; Terebra albida Gray, 1834 (basionym)

= Oxymeris albida =

Species of gastropod

Oxymeris albida, common name : the white auger, is a species of sea snail, a marine gastropod mollusc in the family Terebridae, the auger snails. This Indo-Pacific species is characterized by its slender, high-spired shell with distinct white coloration and brown banding patterns. Like other terebrids, O. albida is a venomous predator that uses a specialized radular tooth to immobilize polychaete prey. The species is commonly found in sandy substrates of shallow tropical waters from East Africa to French Polynesia.

== Description ==
The shell size varies between 25 mm and 46 mm.

== Distribution ==
This species is distributed in Australian waters along Victoria and Tasmania.
