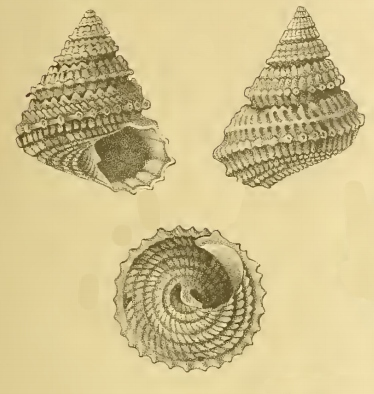
- Original drawing of a shell of Perrinia squamicarinata

Scientific classification
- Kingdom: Animalia
- Phylum: Mollusca
- Class: Gastropoda
- Subclass: Vetigastropoda
- Family: Chilodontaidae
- Genus: Perrinia
- Species: P. squamicarinata

Binomial name
- Perrinia squamicarinata (Schepman, 1908)

Synonyms
- Calliostoma (Perrinia) squamicarinatum Schepman, 1908

= Perrinia squamicarinata =

Species of gastropod

Perrinia squamicarinata is a species of sea snail, a marine gastropod mollusc in the family Chilodontaidae.

== Description ==
(Original description by M.M. Schepman) The size of the shell varies between 4.5 mm and 7 mm. The shell has an elevated-conical shape with slightly convex sides. It is yellowish grey, with dark brown spots at the upper part of whorls and below the periphery. The 6½ narrowly perforate whorls are slightly convex, with a prominent keel. The blunt nucleus is rather smooth, followed by a whorl which is simply costate. The other whorls have 3 spiral lirae, crossed by ribs, which form blunt spines on the upper spiral, round beads on the median one and compressed, spinelike squamae (decumbent scales) on the third spiral or peripheral keel. On the body whorl these ribs become lamellose and double, each rib consisting of about 2 lamellae. The sutures are deeply channelled. The base of the shell is convex, with 5 beaded spirals and lamellose ribs. Moreover the whole shell is covered with microscopic growth-striae. The narrow umbilicus is partly covered by the columellar margin. The aperture is subquadrangularly rounded. The outer and basal margins are rounded in outline, thin, thickened interiorly, with 10 spiral lirae. The columellar margin is cylindrical, only slightly curved, with a rather strong transverse fold. Its base runs without angle in the basal margin, and is slightly expanded over the umbilicus. Its upper part is connected by a thin layer with the outer margin.

== Distribution ==
This marine species occurs off the Philippines.
