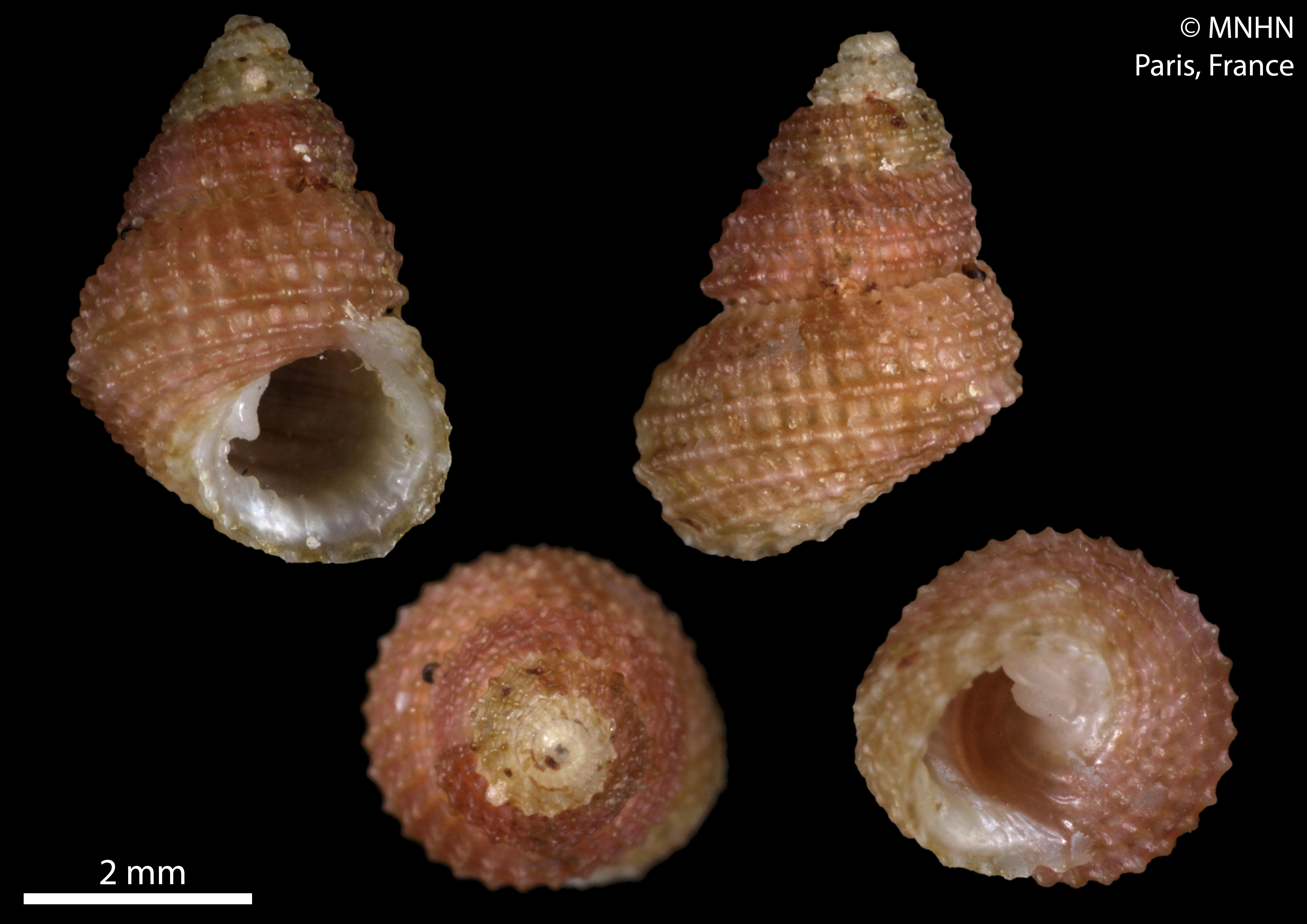
- Shell of Perrinia docili (paratype at MNHN, Paris)

Scientific classification
- Kingdom: Animalia
- Phylum: Mollusca
- Class: Gastropoda
- Subclass: Vetigastropoda
- Family: Chilodontaidae
- Genus: Perrinia
- Species: P. docili

Binomial name
- Perrinia docili Poppe, Tagaro & Dekker, 2006

= Perrinia docili =

Species of gastropod

Perrinia docili is a species of sea snail, a marine gastropod mollusc in the family Chilodontaidae.

== Description ==
The length of the shell varies between 4.3 mm and 5.7 mm.

== Distribution ==
This marine species occurs off the Philippines.
