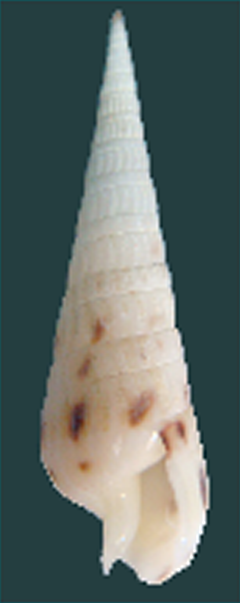
- Shell of Oxymeris strigata

Scientific classification
- Kingdom: Animalia
- Phylum: Mollusca
- Class: Gastropoda
- Subclass: Caenogastropoda
- Order: Neogastropoda
- Family: Terebridae
- Genus: Oxymeris
- Species: O. strigata

Binomial name
- Oxymeris strigata (G. B. Sowerby I, 1825)

Synonyms
- Acus strigatus (G.B. Sowerby I, 1825); Buccinum elongatum Wood, 1828; Terebra flammea Lesson, 1832; Terebra strigata G.B. Sowerby I, 1825; Terebra zebra Kiener, 1839

= Oxymeris strigata =

Species of gastropod

Oxymeris strigata, common name : the zebra auger, is a species of sea snail, a marine gastropod mollusc in the family Terebridae, the auger snails.

== Description ==
The shell size varies between 60 mm and 164 mm. The shell, can be identified by its twelve to fifteen fairly flat-sided whorls which make it sturdy and well-built.

== Distribution ==
This species is distributed in the Gulf of California, along Mexico, and in the Pacific Ocean along Peru and the Galapagos Islands.
