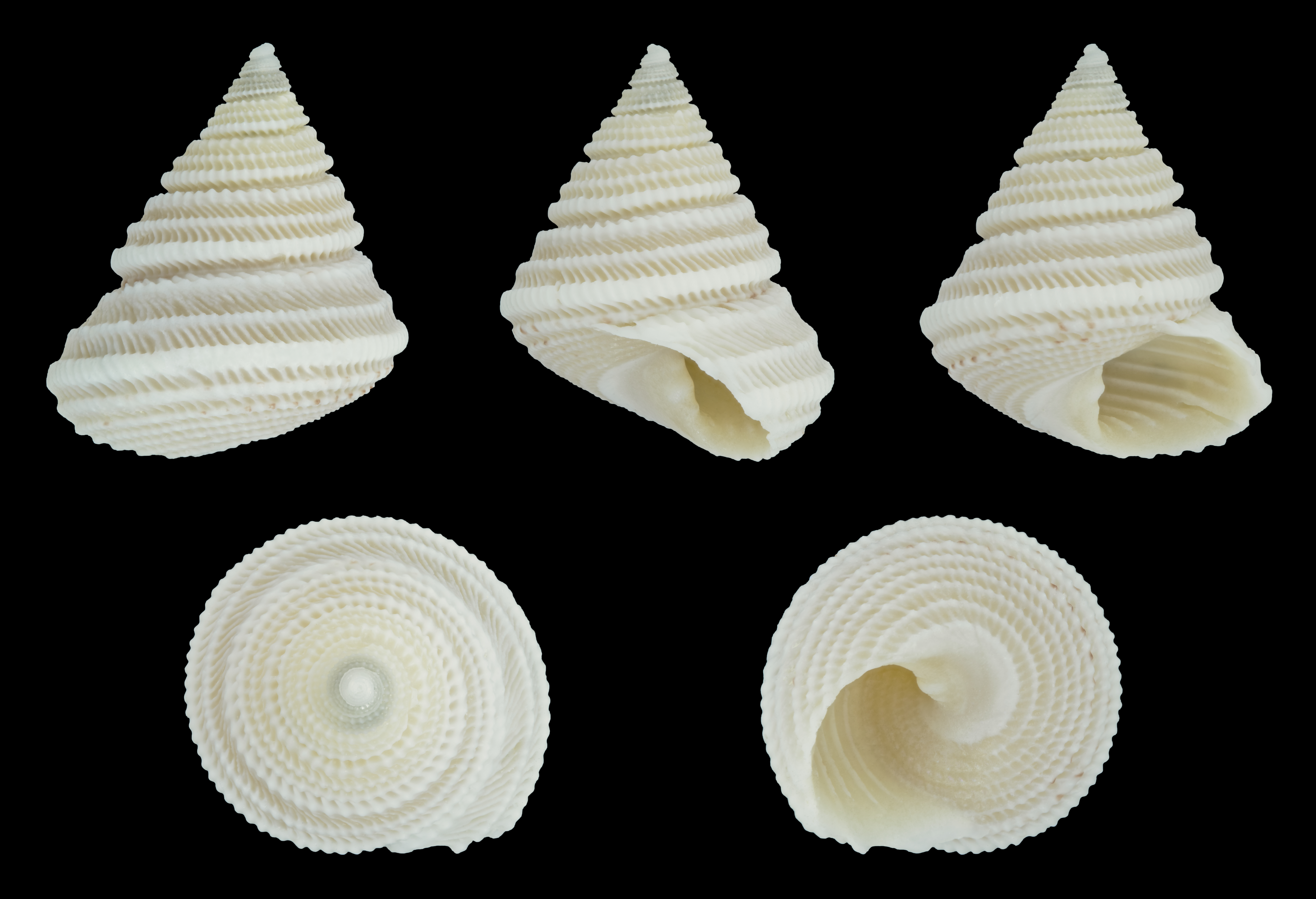
- A shell of Perrinia elisa

Scientific classification
- Kingdom: Animalia
- Phylum: Mollusca
- Class: Gastropoda
- Subclass: Vetigastropoda
- Family: Chilodontaidae
- Genus: Perrinia
- Species: P. elisa

Binomial name
- Perrinia elisa (Gould, 1849)

Synonyms
- Trochus elisus Gould, 1849; Turcica elisa (Gould, 1849)

= Perrinia elisa =

Species of gastropod

Perrinia elisa is a species of sea snail, a marine gastropod mollusc in the family Chilodontaidae.

== Description ==
The size of the shell varies between 8 mm and 20 mm. The thick, solid, imperforate shell has an acutely conical shape. The elevated spire has straight lateral outlines. The base of the shell is convex. Its color is whitish-ashen. The surface is dull. The apex is minute, its tip subimmersed. The apical whorl has a smooth appearance. The rest of the whorls (7 to 8 in all) are traversed spirally by three strong cords, the central one narrowest, all closely beaded by the decussation of close, regular, elevated lamellae of increment, which sharply sculpture the interstices. Two lamellae arise from each bead of the superior spiral cord. The sutures are very deeply, narrowly channelled. The body whorl is angled at the periphery, and bears 7 concentric lirae on the base, the inner ones smaller. The whole is closely sharply sculptured by radiating lamellae. The very oblique aperture is subquadrate with about 9 sharp entering lirae. The outer lip is beveled. The short columella is subvertical and cylindrical, with three or four small, transverse, rather acute folds on the lower half.

The species is known by the three spirals of the spire whorls and the several small folds of the columella.

== Distribution ==
This marine species occurs off Vietnam, Indonesia and the Philippines.
