= Turcica admirabilis =

Scientific classification
- Kingdom: Animalia
- Phylum: Mollusca
- Class: Gastropoda
- Subclass: Vetigastropoda
- Superfamily: Seguenzioidea
- Family: Eucyclidae
- Genus: Turcica
- Species: T. admirabilis

Binomial name
- Turcica admirabilis Berry, 1969

Synonyms
- Turcica panamensis Olsson, 1971

Species of gastropod

Turcica admirabilis is a species of sea snail, a marine gastropod mollusc in the family Eucyclidae.

== Description ==
The size of the shell varies between 25 mm and 40 mm.

== Distribution ==
This species occurs in the Pacific Ocean off Mexico and Colombia.
