= Oxymeris fatua =

Scientific classification
- Kingdom: Animalia
- Phylum: Mollusca
- Class: Gastropoda
- Subclass: Caenogastropoda
- Order: Neogastropoda
- Family: Terebridae
- Genus: Oxymeris
- Species: O. fatua

Binomial name
- Oxymeris fatua (Hinds, 1844)

Synonyms
- Acus fatua (Hinds, 1844); Terebra fatua Hinds, 1844; Terebra pura Deshayes, 1857

Species of gastropod

Oxymeris fatua is a species of sea snail, a marine gastropod mollusc in the family Terebridae, the auger snails.

== Description ==
=== External Shell and Structure ===
The height of the adult shell varies between 30 mm and 81 mm.

The original description by Hinds describes the shell as having a white, smooth, polished exterior with subplanulate recesses. The upper recesses are described as being surrounded by an impressed line. The shell is stated to be decorated with distant dark spots.

Modern specimen photos show the shell as having an elongate conical, orthoconoid spire. The body whorl is rounded. The whorls of the teleoconch are very slightly convex towards the body whorl and are progressively more straight sided as the whorls progress in the adapical (towards the apex) direction. The whorls have an axial structure of radiating impressed lines, as well as a spiral sculpture of one consistent impressed band near to the top of each whorl. The shell itself is glossy and polished, solidly colored ranging from cream white to light pink. The shell has an ovulate aperture.

=== Live Snail ===
O. fatua has lens eyes.

== Distribution and Habitat ==
This species occurs in and is endemic to the Atlantic Ocean off the coast of the islands of Cape Verde. O. fatua is a marine benthic snail that resides in waters less than 15 meters below the surface. Species in Terebridae prefer sandy or muddy habitats that they bury themselves in.

== Life Habits ==
=== Diet ===
This species, like others in Oxymeris, is a carnivorous predator. Species in Terebridae typically have a diet primarily consisting of polychaete worms.

=== Reproduction ===
O. fatua reproduces sexually, is gonochorous, and is a non-broadcast spawner.

=== Locomotion ===
O. fatua moves by mucus mediated gliding.
