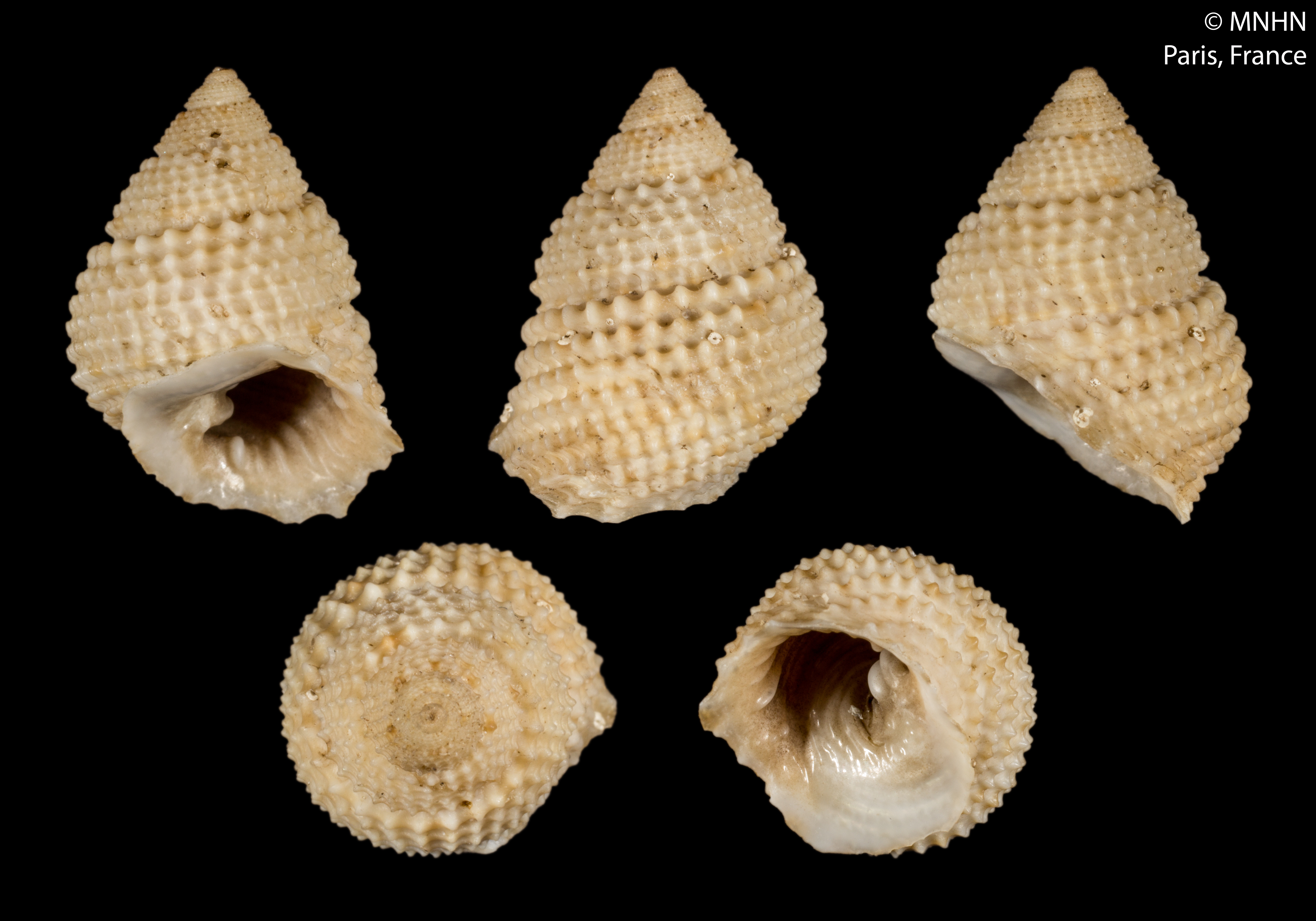
- Shell of Clypeostoma reticulatum (holotype at MNHN, Paris)

Scientific classification
- Kingdom: Animalia
- Phylum: Mollusca
- Class: Gastropoda
- Subclass: Vetigastropoda
- Family: Chilodontaidae
- Genus: Clypeostoma
- Species: C. reticulatum

Binomial name
- Clypeostoma reticulatum Herbert, 2012

= Clypeostoma reticulatum =

Species of gastropod

Clypeostoma reticulatum is a species of sea snail, a marine gastropod mollusc in the family Chilodontaidae.

== Description ==
The shell is relatively large for the genus, reaching a length of about 17 mm. It has a trochoid to turbiniform shape with a conical spire and a deep, globose body whorl. The teleoconch comprises up to six whorls, with the early whorls rounded and later whorls becoming convex. The shell sculpture is strongly cancellate, forming a distinctive net-like pattern that inspired the species name. The shell periphery is rounded, and the aperture is nearly circular. A well-developed basal callus is present.

== Distribution ==
This species occurs in the Southwest Indian Ocean and off Madagascar.
