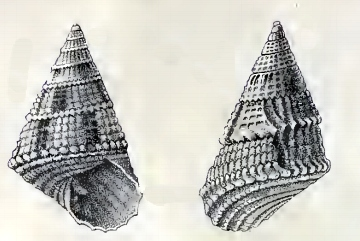
- Original drawing of a shell of Perrinia nigromaculata

Scientific classification
- Kingdom: Animalia
- Phylum: Mollusca
- Class: Gastropoda
- Subclass: Vetigastropoda
- Family: Chilodontaidae
- Genus: Perrinia
- Species: P. nigromaculata

Binomial name
- Perrinia nigromaculata (Schepman, 1908)

Synonyms
- Calliostoma (Perrinia) nigromaculatum Schepman, 1908

= Perrinia nigromaculata =

Species of gastropod

Perrinia nigromaculata is a species of sea snail, a marine gastropod mollusc in the family Chilodontaidae.

== Description ==
(Original description by M.M. Schepman) The size of the shell varies between 8 mm and 13 mm. The imperforate shell has an elevated-conical shape with convex sides. It is yellowish-white, with black-brown square spots, running from the suture to the keel, and more numerous narrow spots and streaks of the same colour on the base. The nucleus is wanting; the 7½ remaining whorls are slightly convex. They are separated by a narrow channelled suture. The upper whorls are slightly worn, with 3 and 4 spiral lirae, which increase to 5 in number on the last 4 or 5 whorls. They are crossed by slightly undulating ribs, with beads where they cross each other, the lowest of the lirae forming the peripheral keel is the largest, and on this one the beads have a tendency to become squamate, (but not so much as in the preceding species). The body whorl descends in front and here the ribs form irregular lamellae. The periphery of body whorl is angular. The base of the shell is convex, with 5 spiral, beaded lirae, the interstices with strong, irregular lamellae. The aperture nearly round, angular at the upper part and very faintly so at the base of the columella. The outer and basal margins are thin, thickened interiorly, with 10 conspicuous lirae, that nearest the columella toothlike. The columella is cylindrical, with a groove round its upper part, running at its left side towards a square notch, formed by a square, toothlike fold at the basal part and the most proximal of the internal lirae of the base. Below the notch there are one large and two small denticles. The parietal wall is callous.

== Distribution ==
This marine species occurs off the Philippines and off Sulawesi, Indonesia.
