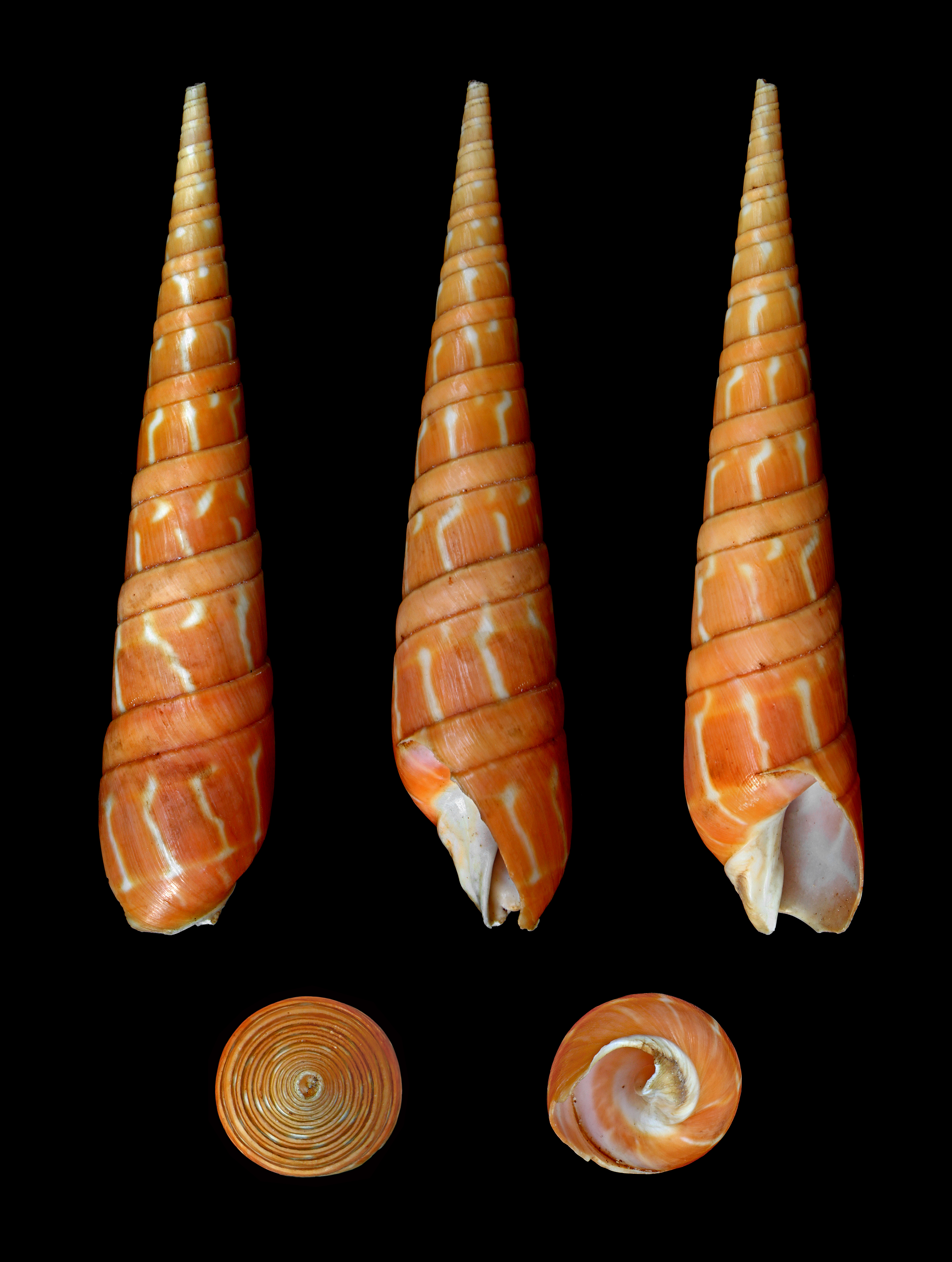
- Shell of Oxymeris dimidiata

Scientific classification
- Kingdom: Animalia
- Phylum: Mollusca
- Class: Gastropoda
- Subclass: Caenogastropoda
- Order: Neogastropoda
- Family: Terebridae
- Genus: Oxymeris
- Species: O. dimidiata

Binomial name
- Oxymeris dimidiata (Linnaeus, 1758)

Synonyms
- Acus dimidiata H. Adams & A. Adams, 1853; Buccinum dimidiatum Linnaeus, 1758; Subula dimidiata (Linnaeus, 1758); Terebra carnea Perry, 1811; Terebra dimidiata Linnaeus, 1758; Terebra dimidiata var. circumvoluta Dautzenberg, 1935; Terebra dimidiata var. pallida Dautzenberg, 1935; Terebra splendens Deshayes, 1857; Vertagus dimidiatus (Linnaeus, 1758)

= Oxymeris dimidiata =

Species of gastropod

Oxymeris dimidiata, with the common name orange auger, is a species of sea snail, a marine gastropod mollusc in the family Terebridae, the auger snails.

== Description ==
The shell size varies between 55 mm and 165 mm. It is characterized by an orange to red color and has "thin, wavy, pale lines."

== Distribution ==
This species occurs in the Red Sea and in the Indian Ocean off Aldabra, Chagos, Madagascar, the Mascarene Basin, Mauritius, Mozambique, KwaZulu (South Africa) and Tanzania; in the Pacific Ocean from Papua New Guinea to Hawaii.
