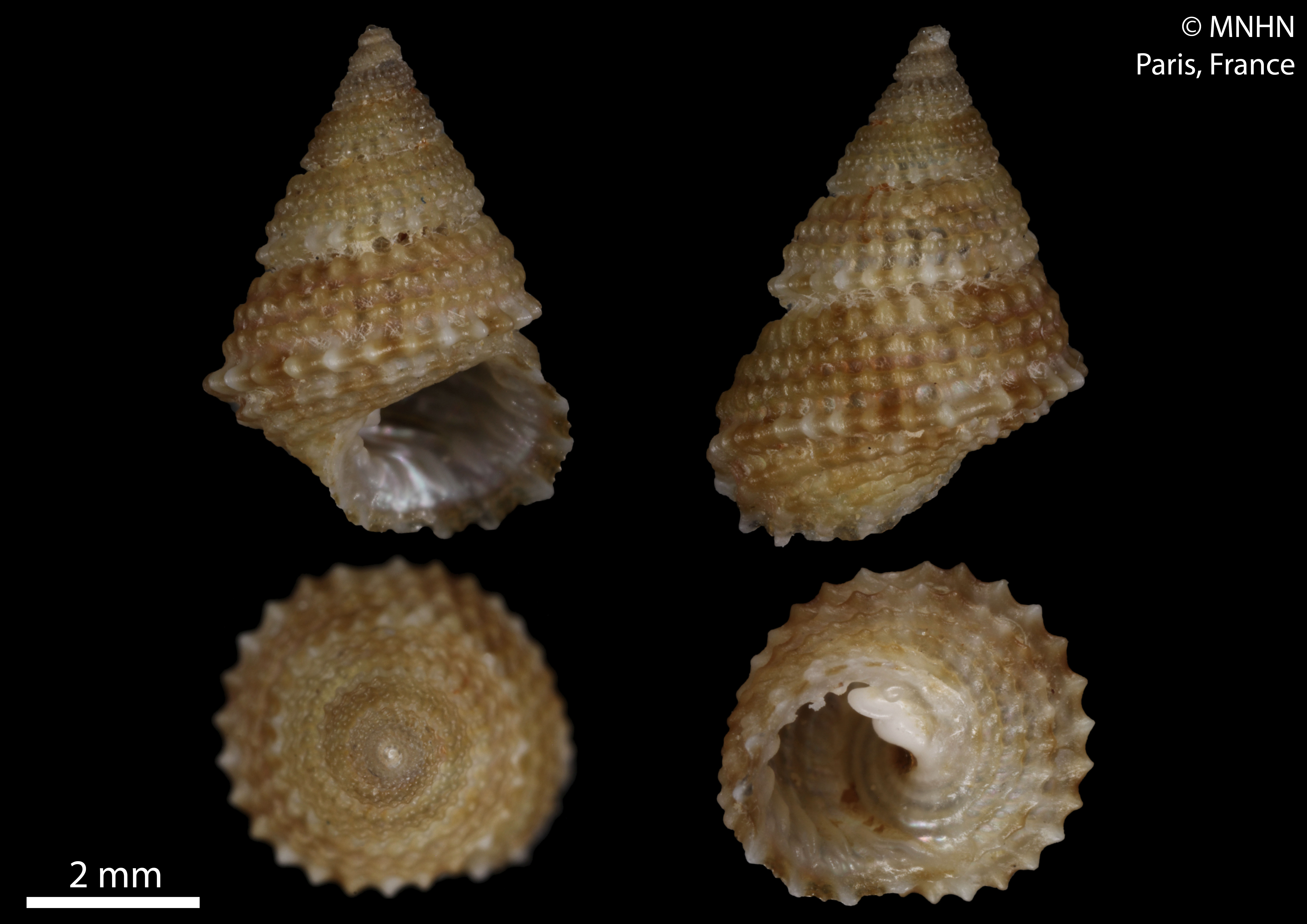
- Shell of Clypeostoma cecileae (paratype at MNHN, Paris)

Scientific classification
- Kingdom: Animalia
- Phylum: Mollusca
- Class: Gastropoda
- Subclass: Vetigastropoda
- Family: Chilodontaidae
- Genus: Clypeostoma
- Species: C. cecileae

Binomial name
- Clypeostoma cecileae (Poppe, Tagaro & Dekker, 2006)

Synonyms
- Perrinia cecileae Poppe, Tagaro & Dekker, 2006 (original combination)

= Clypeostoma cecileae =

Species of gastropod

Clypeostoma cecileae, also known as Cécile’s Toothed Top Shell, and formerly known as Perrinia cecileae, is a species of sea snail, a marine gastropod mollusc in the family Chilodontaidae. It is a recently discovered member of Clypeostoma, first described in the year 2006.

== Description ==
=== External Appearance ===
C. cecileae has a conical shell. The shell has a height of up to 6.6mm and a width of approximately 4.4mm. Photos of the species show the shell as primarily light brown and tan with small areas of white.

=== Shell Structure ===
C. cecileae is described in Novapex as having approximately 6 whorls and,

"protoconch exsert, globose; first whorl with thin axial threads; on second whorl, P3, P4 almost simultaneously, Pland P2 later: no Si; axial threads between cords, connecting beads of cords; on next whorls, spiral cords stronger, P4 gradually the strongest with pointed beads on last whorls, making stellate shape from a basal view: distance between cords at least similar to the size of cords;

- aperture flaring, with 8 elongated denticles on the outer lip and a basal tooth producing a notch with the abapical columellar tooth;
- wo strong columellar teeth, the adapical onerounded, the abapical one squared; columella weakly excavated with a few different in size denticles:
- translucent callus shield covering the umbilical area and partially the parietal area, with weak superficial ridging on the parietal zone
- base with 4 granular spiral cords; distance betweencords similar to the size of cords:
- no umbilicus;
- brown or cream with brown flames."

== Distribution and Habitat ==
This marine species occurs off the coast of Philippines and is a benthic species, residing in tropical waters. Specimens have been noted to be found near Mactan Island. The species prefers deep water, with specimens being found between 63 and 100 meters deep, which is consistent with the depth preferences of other Clypeostoma species.

== Behavior ==
=== Diet ===
C. cecileae feeds by grazing.

=== Reproduction ===
This species reproduces by sexual reproduction.

=== Locomotion ===
C. cecileae reproduces by mucus mediated gliding.
