= Clypeostoma meteorae =

Scientific classification
- Kingdom: Animalia
- Phylum: Mollusca
- Class: Gastropoda
- Subclass: Vetigastropoda
- Family: Chilodontaidae
- Genus: Clypeostoma
- Species: C. meteorae

Binomial name
- Clypeostoma meteorae (Neubert, 1998)

Synonyms
- Agathodonta meteorae Neubert, 1998 (original combination)

Species of gastropod

Clypeostoma meteorae is a species of sea snail, a marine gastropod mollusc in the family Chilodontaidae.

== Description ==
The length of the shell is less than 8 mm. The basal callus shield is not extensive and has a well-developed dentition. The dentition of the aperture is also well developed.

== Distribution ==
This species occurs in the Red Sea, the Gulf of Aden and the western Indian Ocean.
