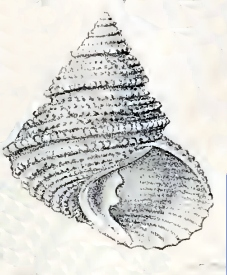
- Drawing with an apertural view of a shell of Turcica monilifera

Scientific classification
- Kingdom: Animalia
- Phylum: Mollusca
- Class: Gastropoda
- Subclass: Vetigastropoda
- Superfamily: Seguenzioidea
- Family: Eucyclidae
- Genus: Turcica
- Species: T. monilifera

Binomial name
- Turcica monilifera A. Adams, 1854

Synonyms
- Turcica coreensis Pease, 1860

= Turcica monilifera =

Species of gastropod

Turcica monilifera is a species of sea snail, a marine gastropod mollusk in the family Eucyclidae.

== Description ==
The size of the shell varies between 10 mm and 30 mm. The thin shell is conoidal, subdiaphanous and imperforate. Its color is, tawny golden-shining. The whorls are a little convex. They are sculptured with spiral beaded cinguli. Their interstices are obliquely striate. The sutures are canaliculate. The base of the shell is convex, with granose cinguli, some granules marked with brown. The aperture is suborbicular. The columella is spiral above, produced into a tooth below. The margin of the lip is acute and lirate inside.

== Distribution ==
This marine species occurs off the Philippines, Japan and in Moreton Bay, Australia.
