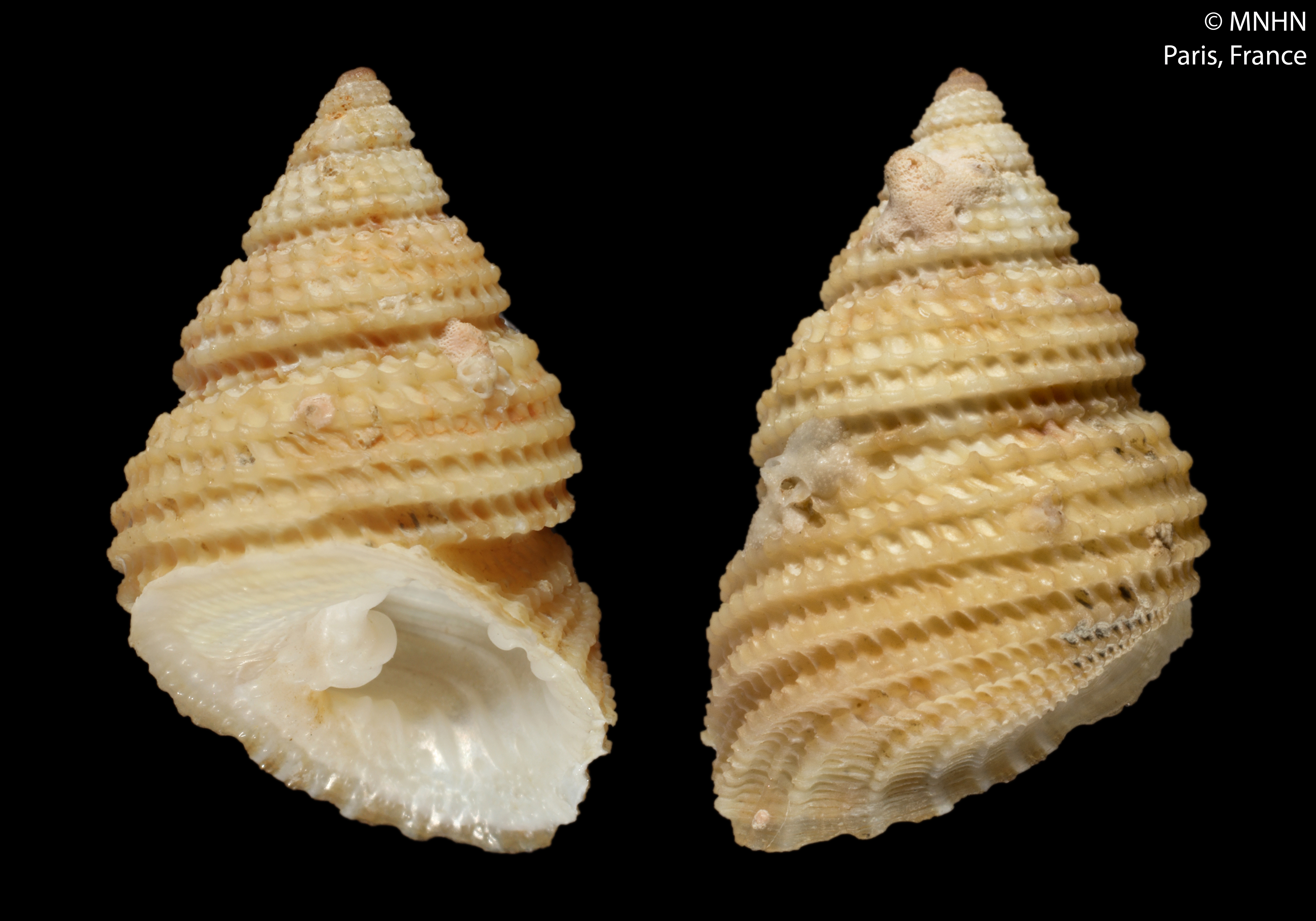
- Shell of Clypeostoma elongatum (holotype at MNHN, Paris)

Scientific classification
- Kingdom: Animalia
- Phylum: Mollusca
- Class: Gastropoda
- Subclass: Vetigastropoda
- Family: Chilodontaidae
- Genus: Clypeostoma
- Species: C. elongatum

Binomial name
- Clypeostoma elongatum (Vilvens, 2001)

Synonyms
- Agathodonta elongata Vilvens, 2001

= Clypeostoma elongatum =

Species of mollusc

Clypeostoma elongatum is a species of sea snails, a marine gastropod mollusc in the family Chilodontaidae (formerly in the family Trochidae, the top snails). It was originally described as Agathodonta elongata.

== Description ==
The size of the shell varies between 7 mm and 24 mm.

== Distribution ==
This marine species occurs off the Philippines and Indonesia.
