= Perrinia konos =

Scientific classification
- Kingdom: Animalia
- Phylum: Mollusca
- Class: Gastropoda
- Subclass: Vetigastropoda
- Family: Chilodontaidae
- Genus: Perrinia
- Species: P. konos

Binomial name
- Perrinia konos (Barnard, 1964)

Synonyms
- Turcica konos Barnard, 1964

Species of gastropod

Perrinia konos is a species of sea snail, a marine gastropod mollusc in the family Chilodontaidae.

== Distribution ==
This species occurs in the Indian Ocean off South Africa and Madagascar.
