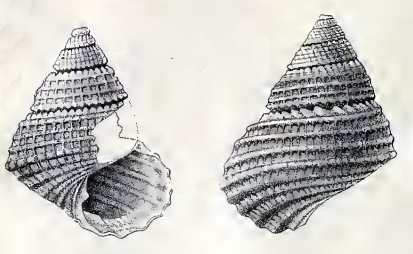
- Original drawing with two views of a shell of Clypeostoma cancellatum

Scientific classification
- Kingdom: Animalia
- Phylum: Mollusca
- Class: Gastropoda
- Subclass: Vetigastropoda
- Family: Chilodontaidae
- Genus: Clypeostoma
- Species: C. cancellatum

Binomial name
- Clypeostoma cancellatum (Schepman, 1908)

Synonyms
- Calliostoma (Perrinia) cancellatum Schepman, 1908 (original combination); Calliostoma cancellatum Schepman, 1908 (original combination); Perrinia cancellata (Schepman, 1908)

= Clypeostoma cancellatum =

Species of gastropod

Clypeostoma cancellatum is a species of sea snail, a marine gastropod mollusc in the family Chilodontaidae.

== Description ==
(Original description by M.M. Schepman) The size of the shell varies between 7 mm and 12 mm. The elevated-conical, imperforate shell has convex sides. It is yellowish-white, with a nacreous lustre and numerous yellowish-brown spots, which are darker near the upper part of each whorl and on the third whorl, the first and second being without markings. The nucleus is wanting, remaining five, slightly convex whorls with a narrow canaliculate suture. The first whorl has rather distant ribs. The next whorls have 3 spiral lirae (fine linear elevations) and radiating ribs. The last 3 whorls contain 5 spirals and thinner radiating ribs, which make the shell cancellated. These ribs become lamellose (with flared axial projections) on the lower whorls. The lirae are beaded where the ribs cross them, less obvious on the lower whorls, the uppermost of the lirae on each whorl with a series of small tubercles, giving a coronated appearance to the whorls. The body whorl is rounded, the peripheral spiral being only very little prominent. The base of the shell is convex, with 6 beaded lirae, cancellated by numerous, irregular, radiating ribs. The aperture is nearly rounded. The outer and basal margins are rounded, thin, thickened interiorly, with about 17 short lirae on the internal rib, of which that near the columella slightly tooth-like. The columella is cylindrical, rather straight, with a tooth-like fold at the base, bordering a rounded notch. The parietal wall is callous. The interior of the aperture has a few grooves.

== Distribution ==
This marine species occurs off Timor, Indonesia.
