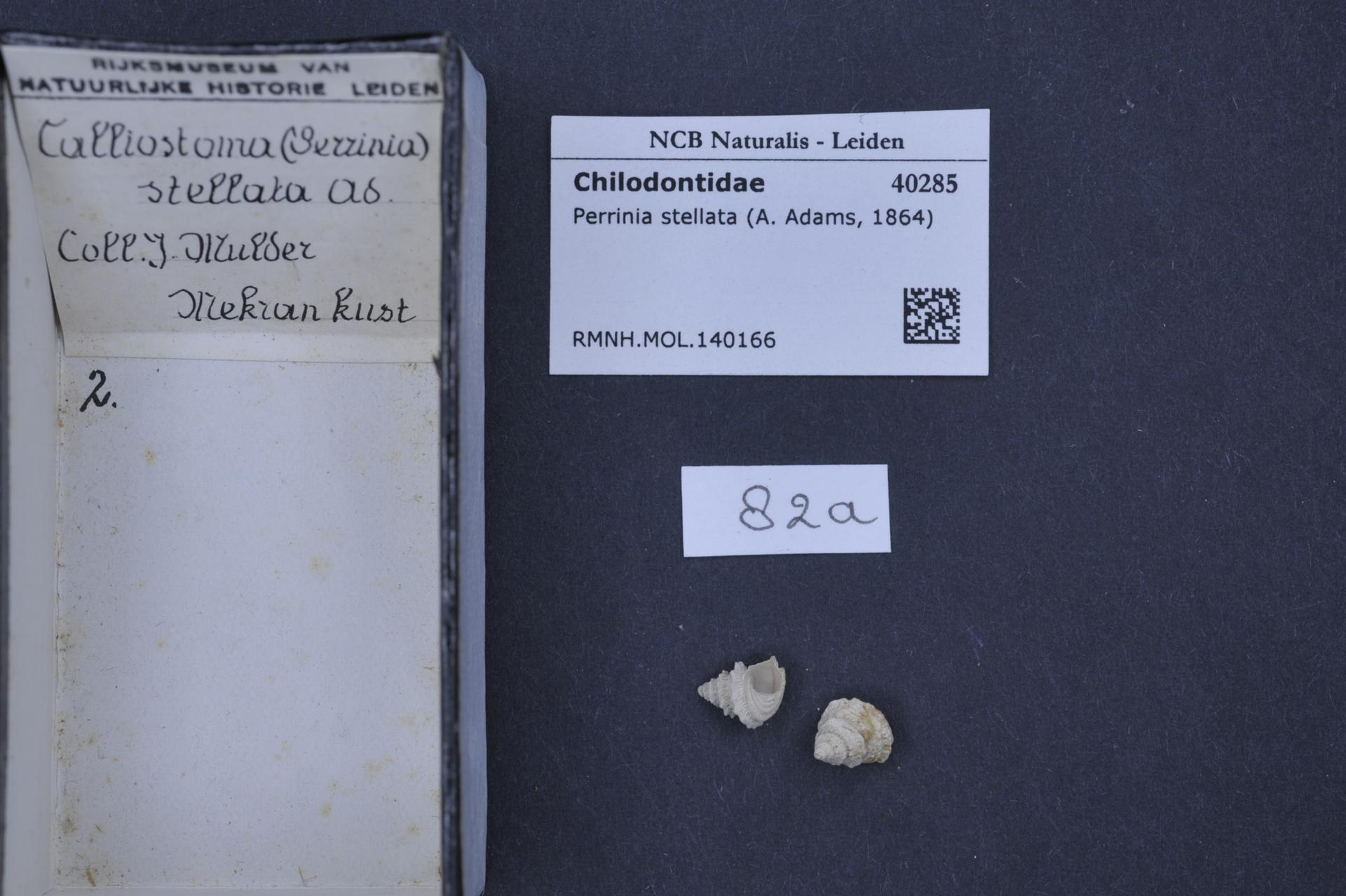

Scientific classification
- Kingdom: Animalia
- Phylum: Mollusca
- Class: Gastropoda
- Subclass: Vetigastropoda
- Family: Chilodontaidae
- Genus: Perrinia
- Species: P. stellata

Binomial name
- Perrinia stellata (A. Adams, 1864)

Synonyms
- Solarium abyssorum Melvill, J.C. & R. Standen, 1903; Tectaria armata Issel, A., 1869; Turcica stellata A. Adams, 1864 (basionym)

= Perrinia stellata =

Species of gastropod

Perrinia stellata is a species of sea snail, a marine gastropod mollusc in the family Chilodontaidae.

== Description ==
The shell size varies between 9-14mm with smaller version recently found (2.65-6.98 mm long by 1.15-2.56 mm wide). "Shell 7mm thick, elongate conical, with strong, stellate, keel like spiral cord; pointed apex with close-set, curved, axial pelicula."

== Distribution ==
This species is distributed in the Red Sea and the Western Indian Ocean in the intertidal area 18-50 meters deep.
