= Clypeostoma salpinx =

Scientific classification
- Kingdom: Animalia
- Phylum: Mollusca
- Class: Gastropoda
- Subclass: Vetigastropoda
- Family: Chilodontaidae
- Genus: Clypeostoma
- Species: C. salpinx

Binomial name
- Clypeostoma salpinx (Barnard, 1964)

Synonyms
- Turcica salpinx Barnard, 1964 (original combination)

Species of gastropod

Clypeostoma salpinx is a species of sea snail, a marine gastropod mollusc in the family Chilodontaidae.

== Description ==
The size of the shell varies between 8 mm and 12 mm.

== Distribution ==
This marine species occurs off South Africa.
