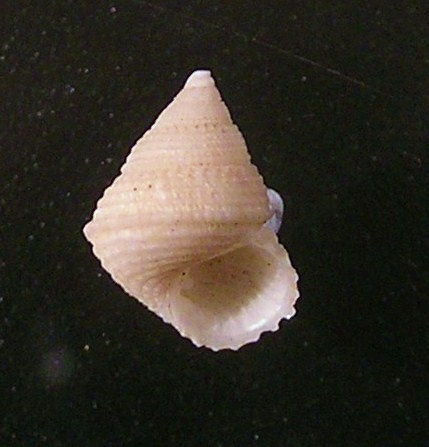
- Lateral view of a shell of Perrinia concinna

Scientific classification
- Kingdom: Animalia
- Phylum: Mollusca
- Class: Gastropoda
- Subclass: Vetigastropoda
- Family: Chilodontaidae
- Genus: Perrinia
- Species: P. concinna

Binomial name
- Perrinia concinna (A. Adams, 1864)

Synonyms
- Turcica concinna A. Adams, 1864

= Perrinia concinna =

Species of gastropod

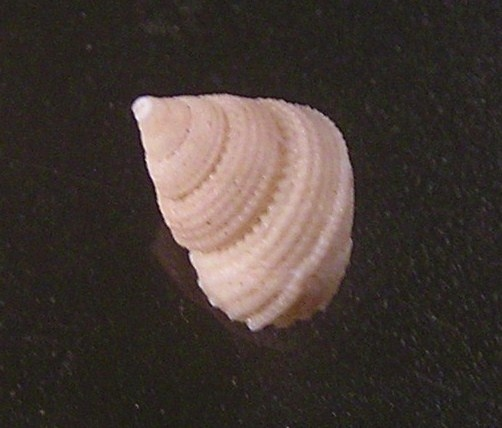
Basal view of a shell of Perrinia concinna

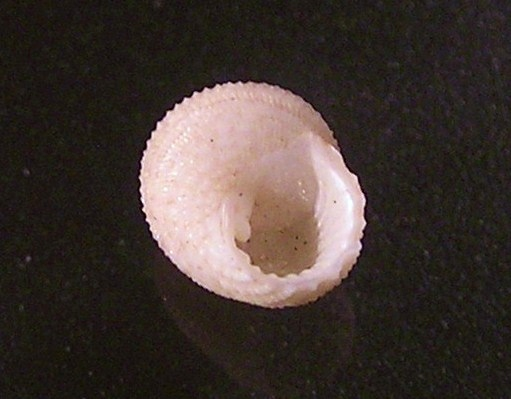
Ventral view of a shell of Perrinia concinna

Perrinia concinna is a species of sea snail, a marine gastropod mollusc in the family Chilodontaidae.

== Description ==
The height of the shell attains 12 mm. The small, solid, imperforate, whitish shell has an ovate-conic shape. The whorls are a little convex, subimbricating, and separated by profoundly canaliculate sutures;. They are finely crenulated below the sutures. They are covered with encircling lirae with the interstices elegantly clathrate. The base of the shell is convex. The oblique aperture is semicircular. The tortuous columella terminates in a tooth. The outer lip subthickened and obsoletely sulcate inside.

== Distribution ==
This marine species occurs the Philippines and in the Indian Ocean off Réunion.
