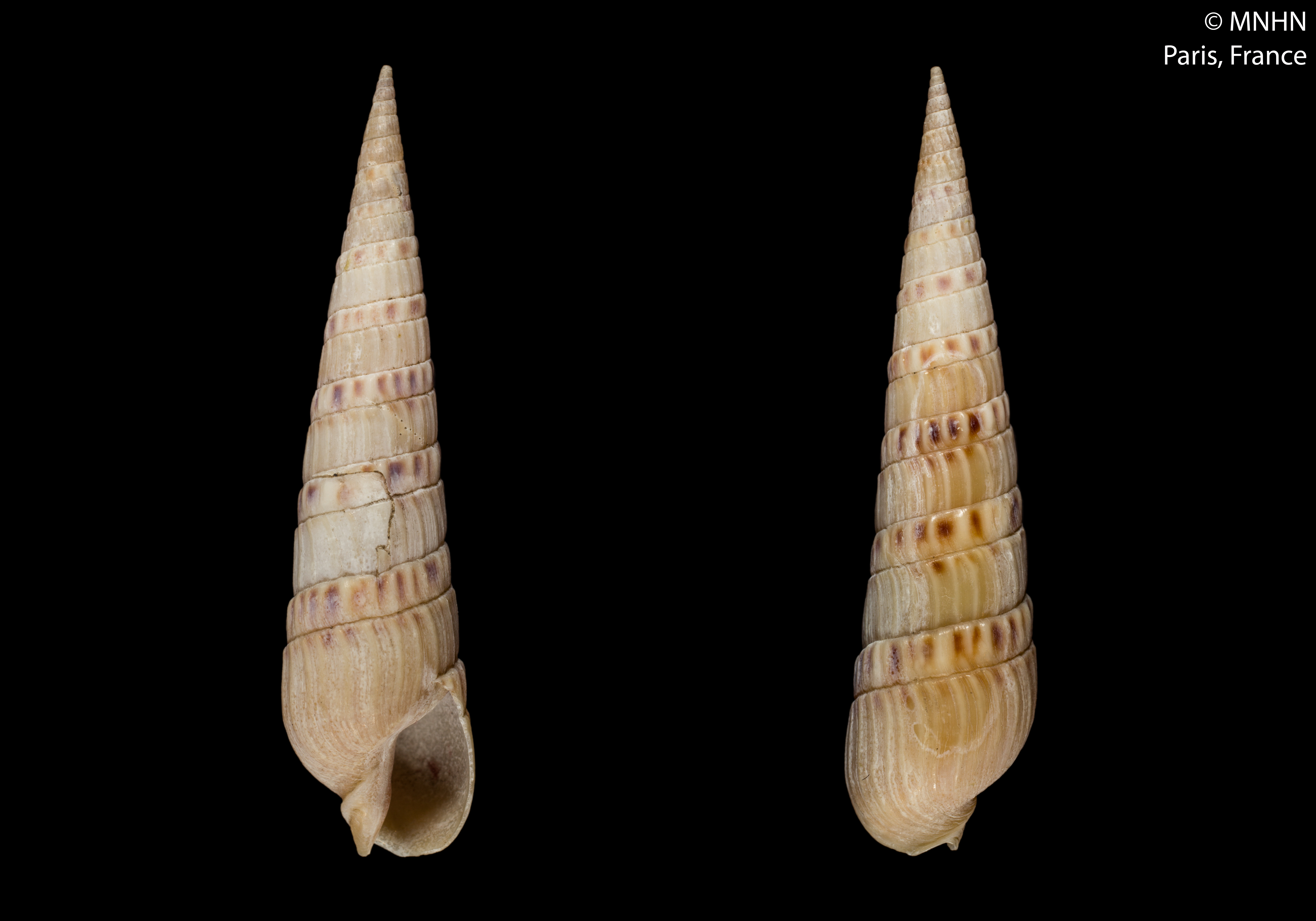

Scientific classification
- Kingdom: Animalia
- Phylum: Mollusca
- Class: Gastropoda
- Subclass: Caenogastropoda
- Order: Neogastropoda
- Family: Terebridae
- Genus: Oxymeris
- Species: O. dillwynii

Binomial name
- Oxymeris dillwynii (Deshayes, 1859)

Synonyms
- Acus dillwynii (Deshayes, 1859); Terebra concinna Deshayes, 1857 (Invalid: junior secondary homonym of Terebra concinna (Dillwyn, 1817); Terebra divisa Pease, 1868, is a replacement name); Terebra dillwynii Deshayes, 1859; Terebra divisa Pease, 1868

= Oxymeris dillwynii =

Species of gastropod

Oxymeris dillwynii is a species of sea snail, a marine gastropod mollusc in the family Terebridae, the auger snails.

== Description ==
The shell size between 15 mm and 85 mm.

== Distribution ==
This species occurs in the Atlantic Ocean off West Africa, the Gulf of Guinea, Senegal, and Cape Verdes.
