= Clypeostoma nortoni =

Scientific classification
- Kingdom: Animalia
- Phylum: Mollusca
- Class: Gastropoda
- Subclass: Vetigastropoda
- Family: Chilodontaidae
- Genus: Clypeostoma
- Species: C. nortoni

Binomial name
- Clypeostoma nortoni (McLean, 1984)

Synonyms
- Agathodonta nortoni McLean, 1984

Species of gastropod

Clypeostoma nortoni is a species of sea snail, a marine gastropod mollusc in the family Chilodontaidae.

== Description ==
It generally lives in tropical environments. Its mineralized skeleton contains calcium carbonate.

== Distribution ==
This marine species occurs in the Indo-West Pacific.
