= Mariae =

Mariae may refer to:

== Biology ==
The specific name mariae is fairly often used:

  - Mollusca, gastropoda:
- Calliostoma mariae a marine gastropod mollusc
- Columbarium mariae a species of pagoda shell, a deepwater sea snail
- Cypraea mariae a small species of cowry, a marine gastropod mollusk
- Helicella mariae a species of land snail in the family Hygromiidae
- Herpetopoma mariae a species of marine gastropod mollusc in the family Trochidae
- Muricopsis espinosus mariae a subspecies of medium-sized sea snail
  - Other mollusca:
- Notoplax mariae a species of chiton in the family Acanthochitonidae.
  - Frogs:
- Hyperolius mariae a species of frog in the family Hyperoliidae
- Centrolene mariae a species of frog in the family Centrolenidae
  - Plants:
- Lithops vallis-mariae a species of plant in the family Aizoaceae
- Livistona mariae a species of flowering plant in the family Arecaceae
  - Others:
- Seimatosporium mariae a plant pathogen.

== Music ==
- Mariae is a soul-blues band from Manila, Philippines.

== Religion ==
- Deiparae Virginis Mariae is an encyclical of Pope Pius XII to all Catholic bishops on the possibility of defining the Assumption of the Blessed Virgin Mary as a dogma of faith.
- The Congregatio Immaculati Cordis Mariae is a Belgian Roman Catholic missionary congregation established in 1862.
- Rosarium Virginis Mariae is the title of an Apostolic Letter by Pope John Paul II, issued on October 16, 2002.
- Servi Jesu et Mariae are a Roman Catholic Congregation for priests, which was founded in 1988 by Father Andreas Hönisch.
