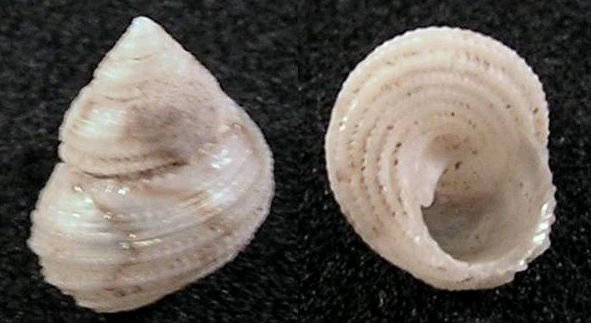
- Two views of a shell of Herpetopoma instrictum

Scientific classification
- Kingdom: Animalia
- Phylum: Mollusca
- Class: Gastropoda
- Subclass: Vetigastropoda
- Family: Chilodontaidae
- Genus: Herpetopoma; Pilsbry, 1890

Type species
- Euchelus scabriusculus A. Adams & Angas, 1867

Species
- See text

Synonyms
- Euchelus (Herpetopoma) Pilsbry, 1890; Huttonia Kirk, 1882 (invalid: junior homonym of Huttonia Pickard-Cambridge, 1881 [Araneae])

= Herpetopoma =

Genus of gastropods

Herpetopoma is a genus of sea snails, marine gastropod molluscs of the family Chilodontaidae.

In the past, this genus was often treated as a subgenus of Euchelus. However, this genus may prove to be a composite taxon, given the diversity of the shell forms.

== Description ==
The shell has a turbinate-conic shape as in Euchelus. The spire is elevated. The operculum is multispiral as in a typical Trochus and with more, less rapidly expanding whorls compared with Euchelus. Species in this genus has typically two teeth, joined by a U-shaped notch, where the columella and the basal lips join.

== Species ==
Species within the genus Herpetoma include:

- Herpetopoma alacerrimum Dell, 1956
- Herpetopoma alarconi (Rehder, 1980)
- Herpetopoma annectans (Tate, 1893)
- Herpetopoma aspersum (Philippi, 1846)
- Herpetopoma barbieri Poppe, Tagaro & Dekker, 2006
- Herpetopoma bellum (Hutton, 1873)
- Herpetopoma benthicola Powell, 1937
- Herpetopoma corallinum Jansen, 1994
- Herpetopoma corrugatum (Pease, 1861)
- Herpetopoma crassilabrum (G. B. Sowerby III, 1905)
- Herpetopoma elevatum Jansen, 1994
- Herpetopoma exasperatum (A. Adams, 1853)
- Herpetopoma fenestratum (Tate, 1893)
- Herpetopoma fimbriatum (Pease, 1861)
- Herpetopoma gemmatum (Gould, 1845)
- Herpetopoma helix (Barnard, 1964)
- Herpetopoma hivaoaense Vilvens, 2017
- Herpetopoma howensis Jansen, 1994
- Herpetopoma instrictum (Gould, 1849)
- † Herpetopoma komiticum (Laws, 1939)
- Herpetopoma larochei (Powell, 1926)
- Herpetopoma lischkei (Pilsbry, 1904)
- Herpetopoma ludiviniae (Poppe, Tagaro & Dekker, 2006)
- Herpetopoma mariae Finlay, 1930
- Herpetopoma naokoae Poppe, Tagaro & Dekker, 2006
- Herpetopoma nexus (Bozzetti, 2014)
- Herpetopoma norfolkense Jansen, 1994
- Herpetopoma pantantoi Vilvens, 2017
- † Herpetopoma parvumbilicatum (Laws, 1939)
- Herpetopoma pauperculum (Lischke, 1872)
- Herpetopoma poichilum Vilvens, 2012
- Herpetopoma pruinosum (Marshall, 1979)
- Herpetopoma pumilio (Tate, 1893)
- Herpetopoma rubrum (A. Adams, 1853)
- Herpetopoma scabriusculum (A. Adams & Angas, 1867)
- Herpetopoma serratocinctum Herbert, 2012
- Herpetopoma seychellarum (G. Nevill & H. Nevill, 1869)
- Herpetopoma stictum Herbert, 2012
- Herpetopoma sulciferum (A. Adams, 1853)
- Herpetopoma verruca (Gould, 1861)
- Herpetopoma vitilevuense Vilvens, 2017
- Herpetopoma vixumbilicatum (Tate, 1893)
- Herpetopoma xeniolum (Melvill, 1918)

Species brought into synonymy

- Herpetopoma aspersa [sic]: synonym of Herpetopoma aspersum (Philippi, 1846) (incorrect gender ending)
- Herpetopoma atratum (Gmelin, 1791): synonym of Euchelus atratus (Gmelin, 1791)
- Herpetopoma bella [sic]: synonym of Herpetopoma bellum (Hutton, 1873)
- Herpetopoma clathratum (A. Adams, 1853): synonym of Vaceuchelus clathratus (A. Adams, 1853)
- Herpetopoma eboreum Vilvens & Heros, 2003: synonym of Herpetopoma xeniolum (Melvill, 1918)
- Herpetopoma fischeri (Montrouzier [in Souverbie & Montrouzier], 1866): synonym of Herpetopoma exasperatum (A. Adams, 1853)
- Herpetopoma foveolatum (A. Adams, 1851): synonym of Vaceuchelus foveolatus (A. Adams, 1853)
- Herpetopoma larochei alacerrima Dell, 1956: synonym of Herpetopoma alacerrimum Dell, 1956
- Herpetopoma providentiae (Melvill, 1909): synonym of Ascetostoma providentiae (Melvill, 1909)
- Herpetopoma ringens (Schepman, 1908): synonym of Ascetostoma ringens (Schepman, 1908)
