= Herpetopoma pumilio =

- Shell of Herpetopoma pumilio (original image)

Scientific classification
- Kingdom: Animalia
- Phylum: Mollusca
- Class: Gastropoda
- Subclass: Vetigastropoda
- Family: Chilodontaidae
- Genus: Herpetopoma
- Species: H. pumilio

Binomial name
- Herpetopoma pumilio (Tate, 1893)

Synonyms
- Euchelus pumilio Tate, 1893 (original combination)

Species of gastropod

Herpetopoma pumilio, common name the diminutive top shell, is a species of small sea snail, a marine gastropod mollusc in the family Chilodontaidae.

== Description ==
The height of the shell reaches 3 mm, its diameter 3.25 mm.

(Original description) This species is closely related to Herpetopoma fenestratum (Tate, 1893). They differ, however, in having more rapidly increasing whorl(s; two stout lirae on the penultimate whorl and five on the body whorl; stouter and more widely spaced transverse riblets, which are, moreover, less oblique and more nearly axial in direction; and feebler nodosities on the lirae. The colour spots are usually confluent along the axial riblets.

== Distribution ==
This marine species is endemic to Australia and occurs off Western Australia.
