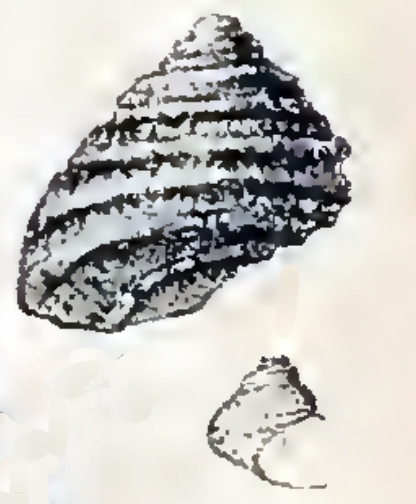
- Drawing of a shell of Herpetopoma pauperculum

Scientific classification
- Kingdom: Animalia
- Phylum: Mollusca
- Class: Gastropoda
- Subclass: Vetigastropoda
- Family: Chilodontaidae
- Genus: Herpetopoma
- Species: H. pauperculum

Binomial name
- Herpetopoma pauperculum (Lischke, 1872)

Synonyms
- Trochus pauperculus Lischke, 1872 (original combination)

= Herpetopoma pauperculum =

Species of gastropod

Herpetopoma pauperculum is a species of sea snail, a marine gastropod mollusc in the family Chilodontaidae.

== Description ==
The size of the shell varies between 4 mm and 8 mm. The small, solid, thick, imperforate shell has a conical shape. It is white, spotted on theribs with blackish-brown. The spire is conical. The sutures are slightly channelled. The five, convex whorls are, encircled by strong spiral ribs, the interstices clathrate, pitted by longitudinal lamellae. The spiral ribs number 3 to 5 on the penultimate, 8 or 9 on the body whorl. The rounded aperture is thickened and crenulate inside. The columella is straight, broad, and not toothed.

== Distribution ==
This marine species occurs off Japan and Korea.
