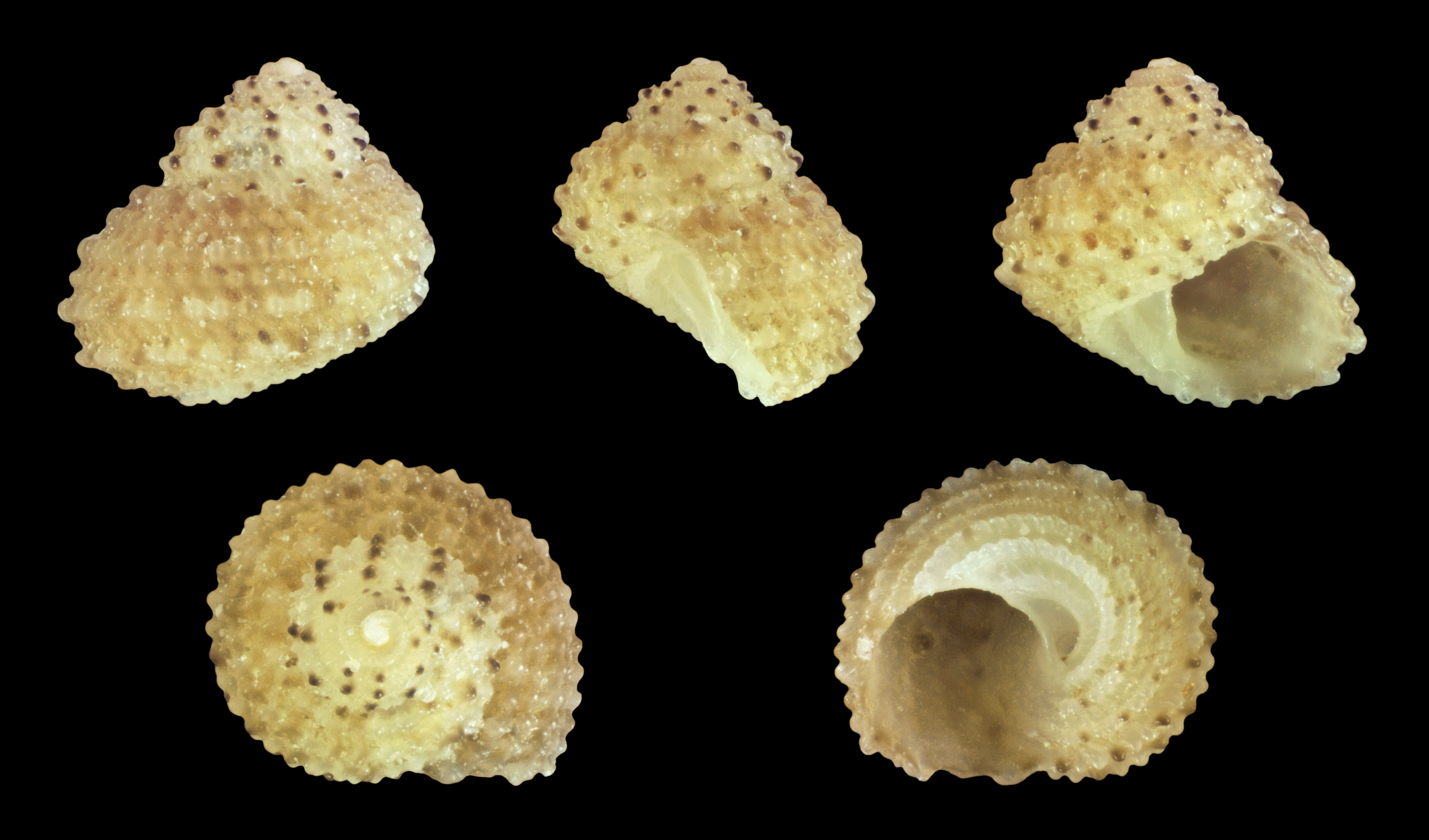
- A shell of Herpetopoma aspersum

Scientific classification
- Kingdom: Animalia
- Phylum: Mollusca
- Class: Gastropoda
- Subclass: Vetigastropoda
- Family: Chilodontaidae
- Genus: Herpetopoma
- Species: H. aspersum

Binomial name
- Herpetopoma aspersum (Philippi, 1846)

Synonyms
- Euchelus aspersus auct.; Euchelus baccatus Menke, 1843; Monodonta baccata Menke, 1843; Trochus aspersus Koch, 1846; Trochus baccatus Philippi, 1846 (original combination)

= Herpetopoma aspersum =

Species of gastropod

Herpetopoma aspersum, the speckled top shell, is a species of sea shell, a marine gastropod mollusc in the family Chilodontaidae.

== Description ==
The size of the shell varies between 6 mm and 18 mm. The imperforate, solid shell has a globose-conic shape. It is pinkish, with sparsely scattered reddish or blackish dots. The elevated spire is conical. It isconstricted by deep, canaliculate sutures; The five convex whorls are encircled by closely beaded equal spirals The interstices are lamellose-striate On the penultimate whorl there are (typically) 9 spirals, 17 on the body whorl, including the base. The body whorl is rounded. The aperture is also rounded. The thick outer lip is crenulate inside. The columella is concave, terminating in a minute tooth, and bounded by a longitudinal groove.

There is considerable variation in degree of elongation, some shells being high, subscalariform. The number of lirae on the penultimate whorl, their equality in size, and the coloration, are the more salient specific characters.

== Distribution ==
This marine species occurs off South Australia and Tasmania, and off the Solomons.
