= Herpetopoma serratocinctum =

Scientific classification
- Kingdom: Animalia
- Phylum: Mollusca
- Class: Gastropoda
- Subclass: Vetigastropoda
- Family: Chilodontaidae
- Genus: Herpetopoma
- Species: H. serratocinctum

Binomial name
- Herpetopoma serratocinctum Herbert, 2012

Species of gastropod

Herpetopoma serratocinctum is a species of sea snail, a marine gastropod mollusc in the family Chilodontaidae.

== Description ==
The height of the shell attains 3 mm.

== Distribution ==
This species occurs in the Indian Ocean off the Mascarenes.
