= Herpetopoma fimbriatum =

Scientific classification
- Kingdom: Animalia
- Phylum: Mollusca
- Class: Gastropoda
- Subclass: Vetigastropoda
- Family: Chilodontaidae
- Genus: Herpetopoma
- Species: H. fimbriatum

Binomial name
- Herpetopoma fimbriatum (Pease, 1861)

Species of gastropod

Herpetopoma fimbriatum is a species of sea snail, a marine gastropod mollusc in the family Chilodontaidae.

== Distribution ==
This species occurs in the Pacific Ocean off Hawaii.
