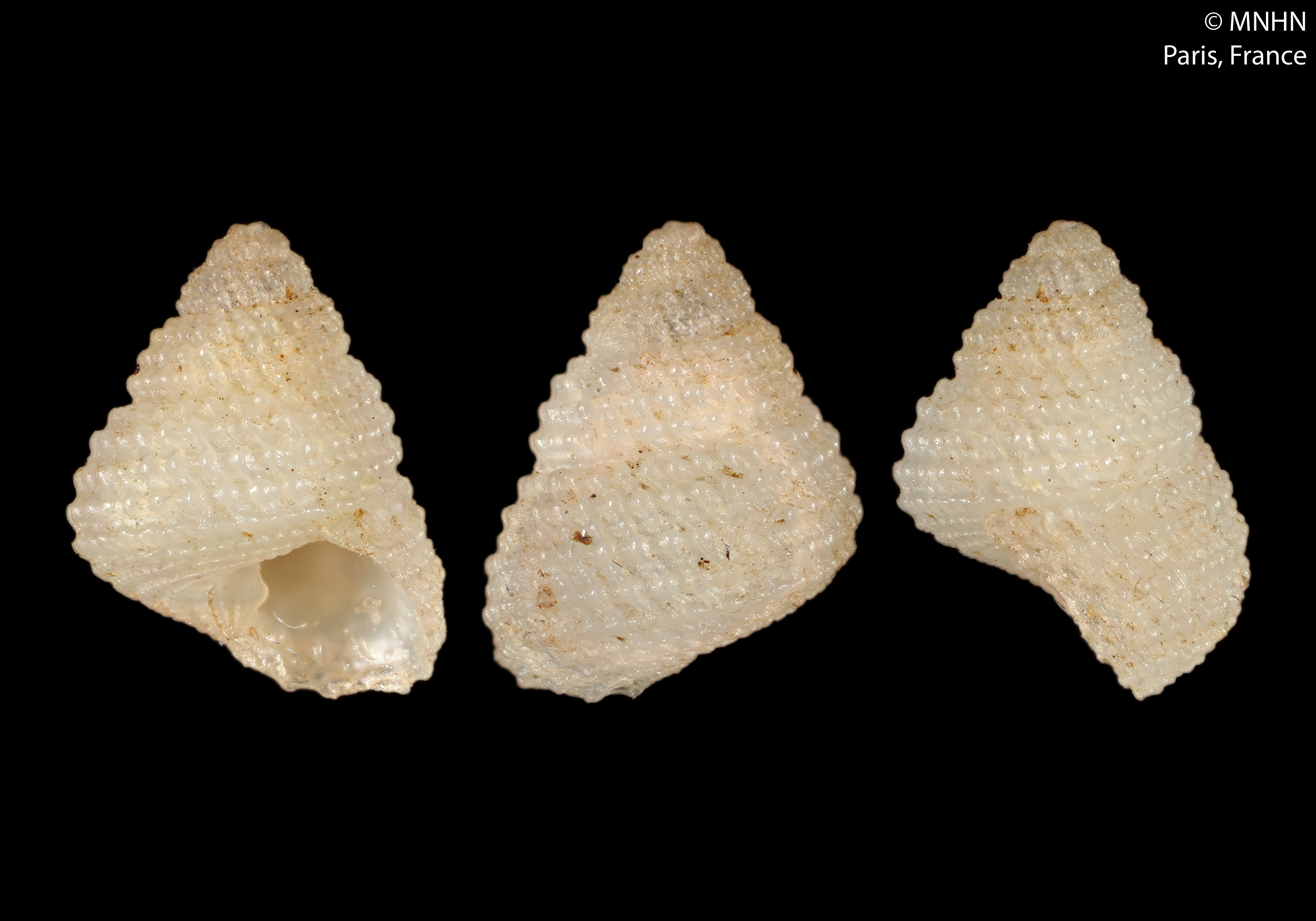
- Shell of Herpetopoma poichilum (holotype at MNHN, Paris)

Scientific classification
- Kingdom: Animalia
- Phylum: Mollusca
- Class: Gastropoda
- Subclass: Vetigastropoda
- Family: Chilodontaidae
- Genus: Herpetopoma
- Species: H. poichilum

Binomial name
- Herpetopoma poichilum Vilvens, 2012

= Herpetopoma poichilum =

Species of gastropod

Herpetopoma poichilum is a species of sea snail, a marine gastropod mollusc in the family Chilodontaidae.

== Distribution ==
This species occurs in the Pacific Ocean off French Polynesia.
