= Mirachelus acanthus =

Scientific classification
- Kingdom: Animalia
- Phylum: Mollusca
- Class: Gastropoda
- Subclass: Vetigastropoda
- Family: Chilodontaidae
- Genus: Mirachelus
- Species: M. acanthus

Binomial name
- Mirachelus acanthus Quinn, 1991

Species of gastropod

Mirachelus acanthus is a species of sea snail, a marine gastropod mollusc in the family Chilodontaidae.

== Description ==
The height of the shell attains 3.7 mm. This species occurs in the Atlantic Ocean off the Bermudas.
