= Herpetopoma ludiviniae =

Scientific classification
- Kingdom: Animalia
- Phylum: Mollusca
- Class: Gastropoda
- Subclass: Vetigastropoda
- Family: Chilodontaidae
- Genus: Herpetopoma
- Species: H. ludiviniae

Binomial name
- Herpetopoma ludiviniae (Poppe, Tagaro & Dekker, 2006à

Synonyms
- Vaceuchelus ludiviniae Poppe, Tagaro & H. Dekker, 2006

Species of gastropod

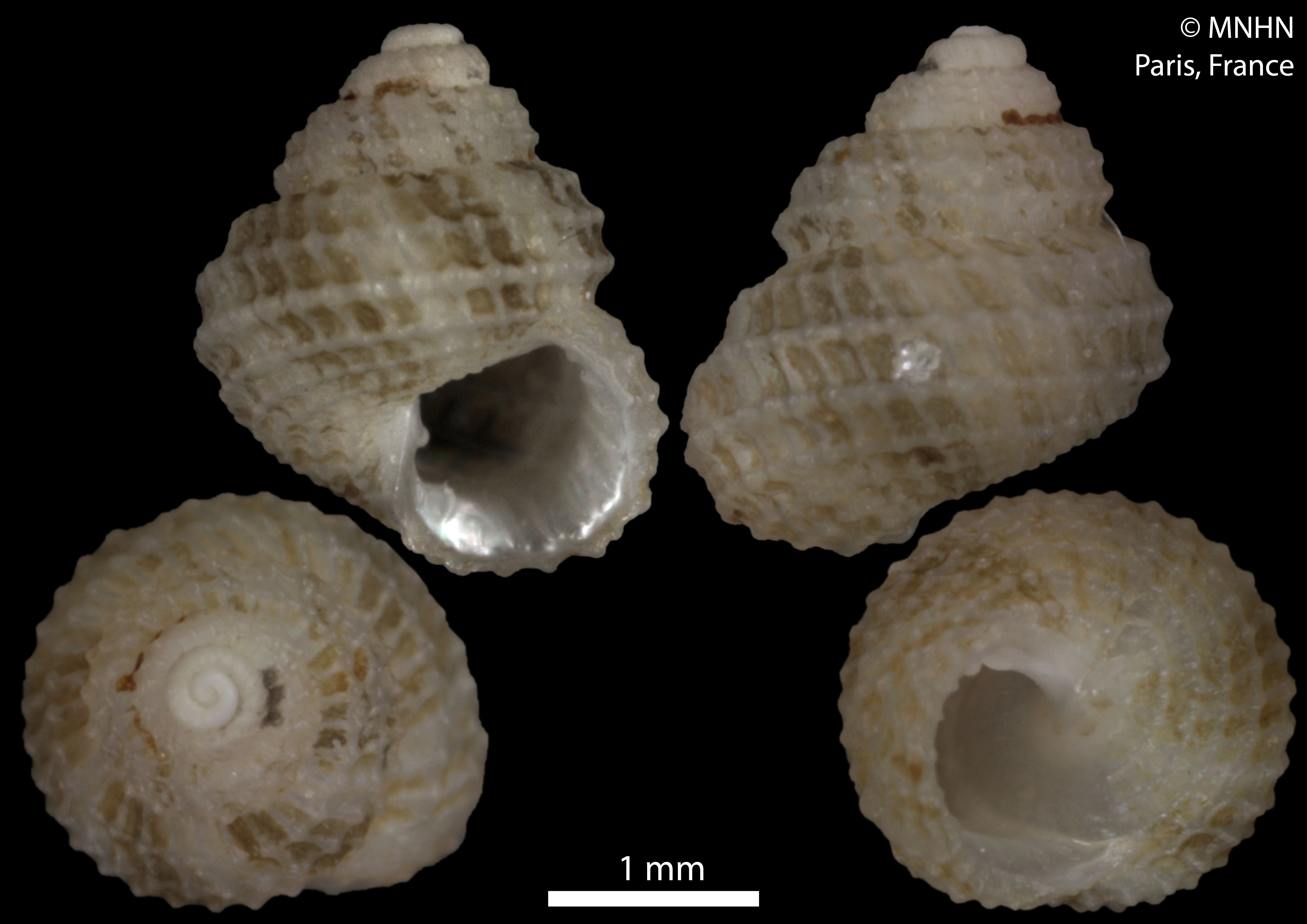
Herpetopoma ludiviniae

Herpetopoma ludiviniae is a species of sea snail, a marine gastropod mollusc in the family Chilodontaidae.

== Description ==
The size of the shell varies between 2.7 mm and 4.5 mm.

== Distribution ==
This marine species occurs off the Philippines.
