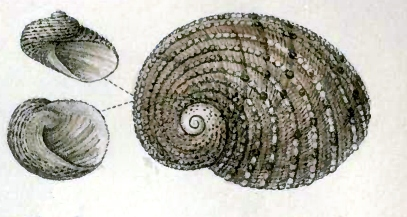
- Drawing with three views of a shell of Granata lyrata

Scientific classification
- Kingdom: Animalia
- Phylum: Mollusca
- Class: Gastropoda
- Subclass: Vetigastropoda
- Family: Chilodontaidae
- Genus: Granata
- Species: G. lyrata

Binomial name
- Granata lyrata (Pilsbry, 1890)

Synonyms
- Stomatella lyrata Pilsbry, 1890 (original combination)

= Granata lyrata =

Species of gastropod

Granata lyrata, common name the elegant stomatella, is a species of sea snail, a marine gastropod mollusC in the family Chilodontaidae.

== Description ==
The height of the shell attains 15 mm. The thin but solid shell has a depressed-globose shape. It is pinkish, with dots of deep brown or black and white on the spiral riblets. The spire is short. The sutures are deeply impressed. The surface of whorls are encircled by narrow spiral lirae, separated by spaces about 1 mm wide (in a specimen of 15 mm diam.). These interstices are closely latticed by oblique raised striae, and bear on the last part of the whorl from one to three minute spiral interstitial threads. There are about 16 principal threads on the body whorl of the largest specimen, but this character is extremely variable. The three whorls are convex with the last whorl descending. The large aperture is very oblique, rounded-oval, nacreous, iridescent and slightly sulcate within, corresponding to the sculpture of the outside. The arcuate columella is narrow and flattened.

== Distribution ==
This marine species occurs off Japan and the Philippines.
