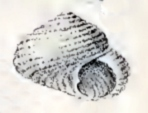
- 1889 illustration of an apertural view of a shell of Herpetopoma seychellarum

Scientific classification
- Kingdom: Animalia
- Phylum: Mollusca
- Class: Gastropoda
- Subclass: Vetigastropoda
- Family: Chilodontaidae
- Genus: Herpetopoma
- Species: H. seychellarum

Binomial name
- Herpetopoma seychellarum (G. Nevill & H. Nevill, 1869)

Synonyms
- Euchelus seychellarum G. Nevill & H. Nevill, 1869

= Herpetopoma seychellarum =

Species of gastropod

Herpetopoma seychellarum is a species of sea snail, a marine gastropod mollusc in the family Chilodontaidae.

== Description ==
The height of the shell attains 3 mm. The small, white, rather solid, subglobose shell has a depressed-conical shape. The four whorls are a little convex. They are joined by an impressed suture, and ornamented by spiral closely, minutely granulose riblets; The body whorl is rounded at the periphery. The base of the shell is convex, spirally granulate-ribbed, and narrowly umbilicate. The aperture is subrotund. The outer lip is regularly arched, its edge rather obtuse, and sulcate inside. The columella is straight, obliquely sloping, with a small tooth below.

== Distribution ==
This species occurs in the Indian Ocean off the Seychelles.
