= Herpetopoma lischkei =

Scientific classification
- Kingdom: Animalia
- Phylum: Mollusca
- Class: Gastropoda
- Subclass: Vetigastropoda
- Family: Chilodontaidae
- Genus: Herpetopoma
- Species: H. lischkei

Binomial name
- Herpetopoma lischkei (Pilsbry, 1904)

Synonyms
- Euchelus lischkei Pilsbry, 1904

Species of gastropod

Herpetopoma lischkei is a species of sea snail, a marine gastropod mollusc in the family Chilodontaidae.

== Description ==
The height of the shell attains 22 mm. The shell is mostly brown in color.

== Biology ==
This species is a deposit feeder.

== Distribution ==
This marine species occurs off Japan and the Philippines.
