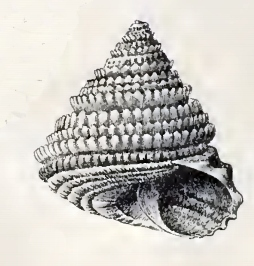
- Original drawing with an apertural view of a shell of Dentistyla dentifera

Scientific classification
- Kingdom: Animalia
- Phylum: Mollusca
- Class: Gastropoda
- Subclass: Vetigastropoda
- Family: Chilodontaidae
- Genus: Dentistyla
- Species: D. dentifera

Binomial name
- Dentistyla dentifera (Dall, 1889)

Synonyms
- Antillachelus dentiferum Dall, 1889 (original combination); Calliostoma asperiimum var. dentiferum Dall, 1889

= Dentistyla dentifera =

Species of gastropod

Dentistyla dentifera is a species of sea snail, a marine gastropod mollusc in the family Chilodontaidae.

== Description ==
The size of the shell varies between 4 mm and 8 mm. The sculpture, compared to Dentistyla asperrima, is more strongly and exclusively nodulous. A strong blunt tooth is prominent on the columella just within the aperture and above the base of the shell. The outer lip is lirate within.

== Distribution ==
This species occurs in the Gulf of Mexico, off Barbados and in the Atlantic Ocean off North Carolina.
