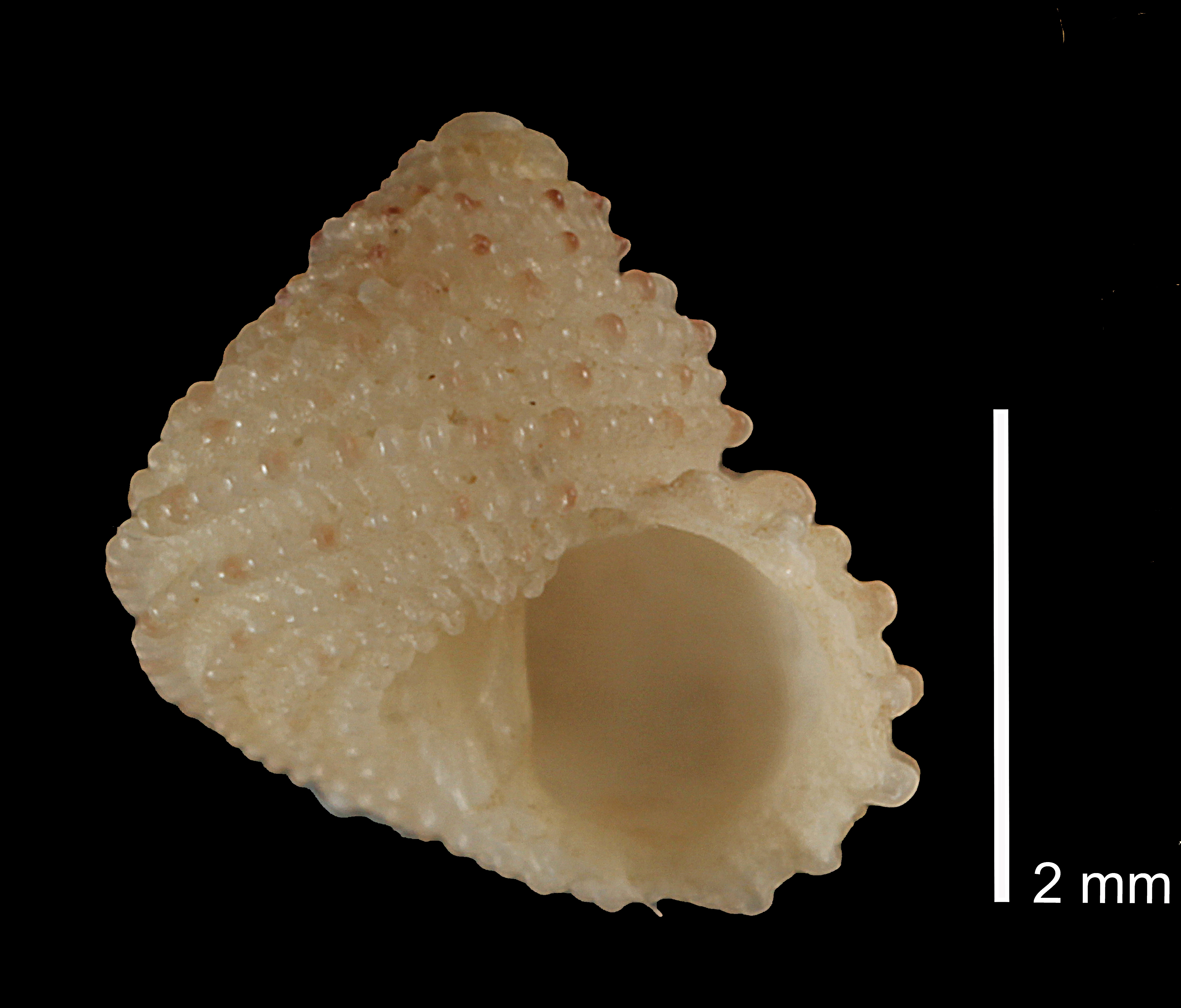
- Shell of Herpetopoma corrugatum (specimen at MNHN, Paris)

Scientific classification
- Kingdom: Animalia
- Phylum: Mollusca
- Class: Gastropoda
- Subclass: Vetigastropoda
- Family: Chilodontaidae
- Genus: Herpetopoma
- Species: H. corrugatum

Binomial name
- Herpetopoma corrugatum (Pease, 1861)

Synonyms
- Euchelus corrugatus Pease, 1861

= Herpetopoma corrugatum =

Species of gastropod

Herpetopoma corrugatum is a species of sea snail, a marine gastropod mollusc in the family Chilodontaidae.

== Distribution ==
This species occurs in the Pacific Ocean off Hawaii.
