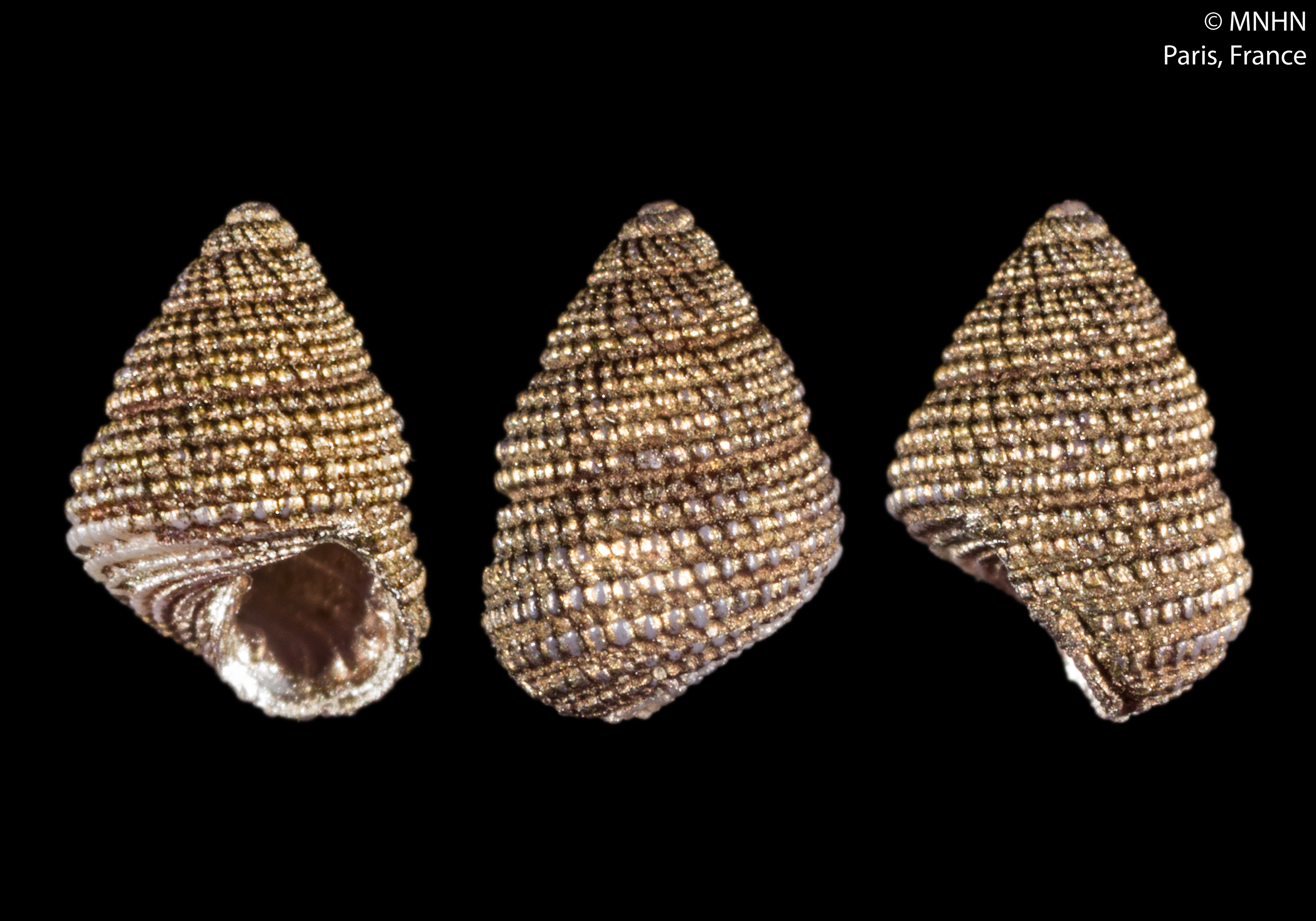
- Shell of Herpetopoma xeniolum (holotype at MNHN, Paris)

Scientific classification
- Kingdom: Animalia
- Phylum: Mollusca
- Class: Gastropoda
- Subclass: Vetigastropoda
- Family: Chilodontaidae
- Genus: Herpetopoma
- Species: H. xeniolum

Binomial name
- Herpetopoma xeniolum (Melvill, 1918)

Synonyms
- Euchelus xeniolum Melvill, 1918 (original combination); Herpetopoma eboreum Vilvens & Heros, 2003; † Perrinia waiwailevensis Ladd, H.S., 1982; † Turcica (Perrinia) waiwailevensis Ladd, 1982

= Herpetopoma xeniolum =

Species of gastropod

Herpetopoma xeniolum is a species of sea snail, a marine gastropod mollusc in the family Chilodontaidae.

D.G. Herbert (2012) wasn't convinced that this poorly known species belonged in the genus Herpetopoma and puts it in Herpetopoma sensu lato.

== Description ==
The length of the shell attains 3.7 mm

The whorls of this relatively high-spired shell are rather flat-sided and show a fine sculpture. Some of the denticles of the outer lip extend into the aperture. There is a number of variation in the spiral cords of the examined specimens.

== Distribution ==
This species occurs in the Indo-West Pacific, in the Gulf of Oman and off Réunion, New Caledonia and the Philippines; as a fossil from the Pliocene off Fiji.
