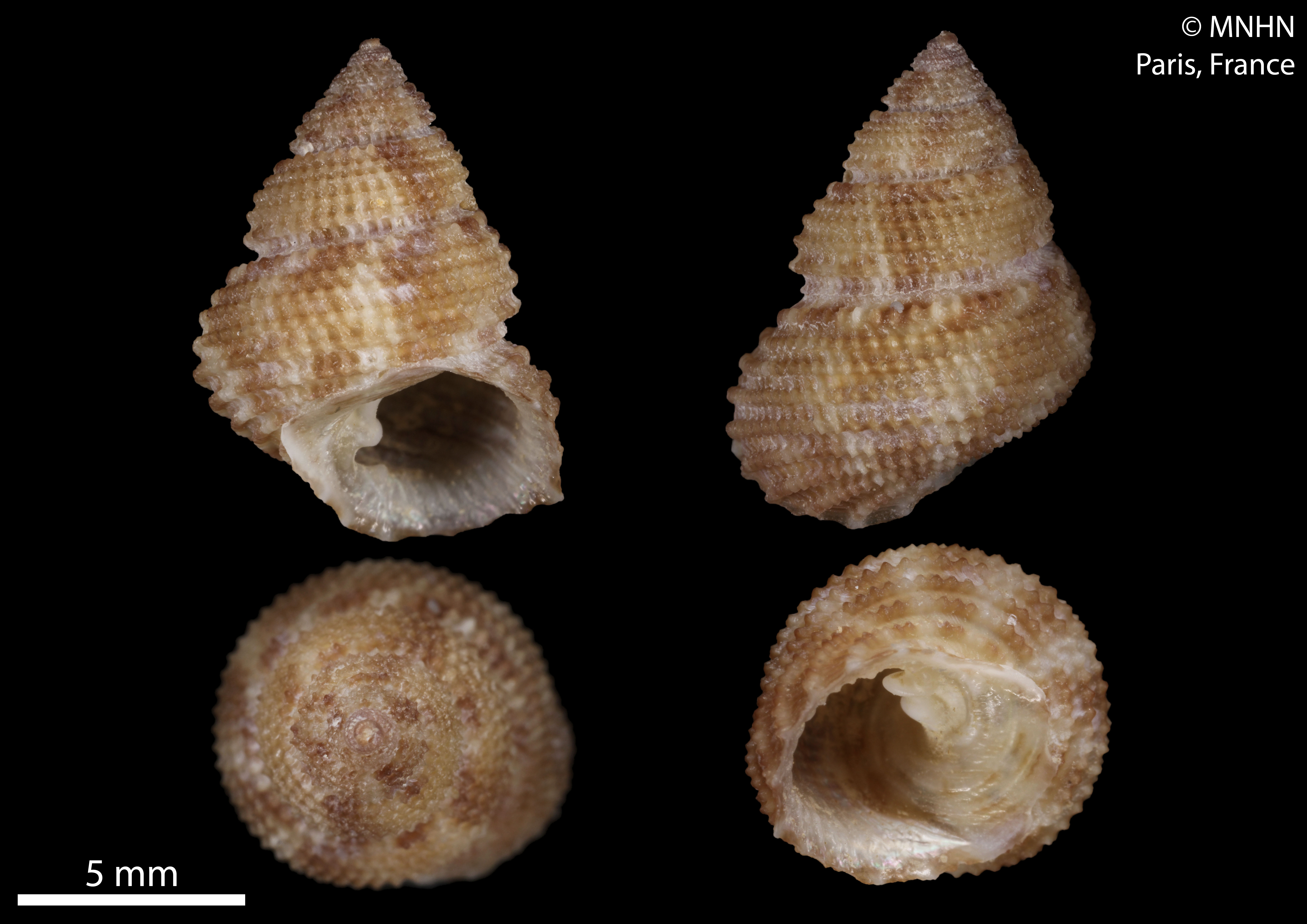
- Shell of Herpetopoma barbieri (paratype at MNHN, Paris)

Scientific classification
- Kingdom: Animalia
- Phylum: Mollusca
- Class: Gastropoda
- Subclass: Vetigastropoda
- Family: Chilodontaidae
- Genus: Herpetopoma
- Species: H. barbieri

Binomial name
- Herpetopoma barbieri Poppe, Tagaro & Dekker, 2006

= Herpetopoma barbieri =

Species of gastropod

Herpetopoma barbieri is a species of sea snail, a marine gastropod mollusc in the family Chilodontaidae.

== Description ==
The size of the shell varies between 7 mm and 12 mm.

== Distribution ==
This marine species occurs off the Philippines.
