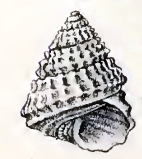
- Drawing of a shell of Mirachelus corbis

Scientific classification
- Kingdom: Animalia
- Phylum: Mollusca
- Class: Gastropoda
- Subclass: Vetigastropoda
- Family: Chilodontaidae
- Genus: Mirachelus
- Species: M. corbis

Binomial name
- Mirachelus corbis (Dall, 1889)

Synonyms
- Calliostoma corbis Dall, 1889 (original combination)

= Mirachelus corbis =

Species of gastropod

Mirachelus corbis is a species of sea snail, a marine gastropod mollusc in the family Chilodontaidae.

== Description ==
The size of the shell varies between 3 mm and 5 mm. The small, white shell shows a glassy minute apparently dextral nucleus and about six whorls. The first one or two have concave arched transverse ribs. The others are very strongly reticulately sculptured. The spiral sculpture consists of one very strong rib on the periphery, a slightly weaker one near the suture, and another (which is rarely absent) midway between them. On the base there are four strong spirals a little undercut at their outer edges. The transverse sculpture of strong thin oblique radii (27–30 on the last whorl) follow the lines of growth, reticulating the spirals (on crossing which they become slightly nodose) and forming deep squarish pits, which are elongated in the adult by the crowding of the radii toward the mouth. The suture appears channelled, as the whorl falls short of the peripheral rib which overhangs it, but is not really so. The base is flexuously radiately ridged but not reticulate;. The rounded apertureis thickened within and lirate. The thick columella has an obtuse knob (almost a tooth) about the middle of it. Umbilicus none; whorls flattened above between periphery and suture. The base of the shell is rather rounded.

== Distribution ==
This species occurs in the Caribbean Sea, the Gulf of Mexico, the seas around Cuba and the Lesser Antilles.
