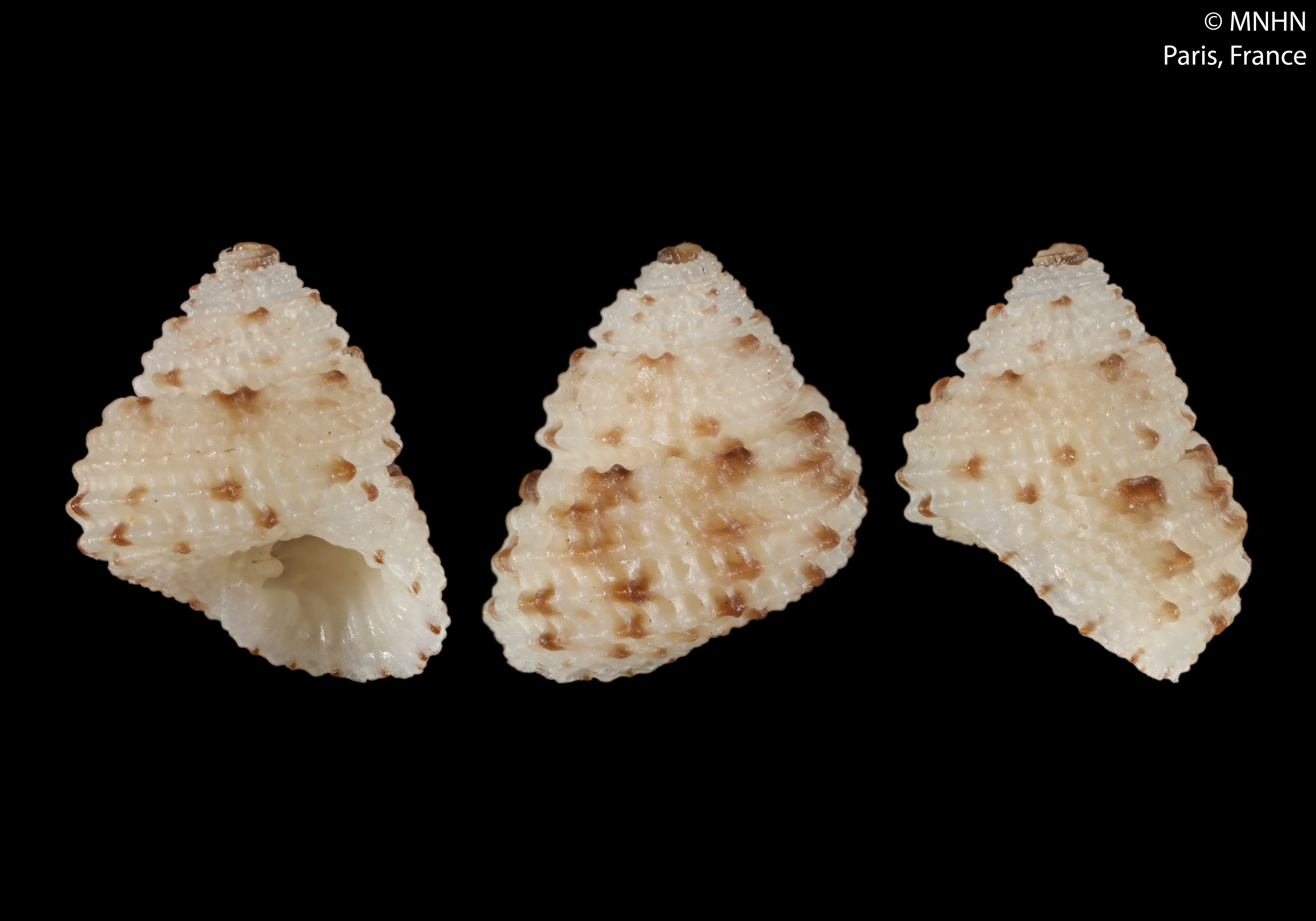
- Shell of Herpetopoma stictum (holotype at MNHN, Paris)

Scientific classification
- Kingdom: Animalia
- Phylum: Mollusca
- Class: Gastropoda
- Subclass: Vetigastropoda
- Family: Chilodontaidae
- Genus: Herpetopoma
- Species: H. stictum

Binomial name
- Herpetopoma stictum Herbert, 2012

= Herpetopoma stictum =

Species of gastropod

Herpetopoma stictum is a species of sea snail, a marine gastropod mollusc in the family Chilodontaidae.

== Description ==
The height of the shell attains 5.3 mm.

== Distribution ==
This species occurs in the Indian Ocean off Mauritius and Réunion.
