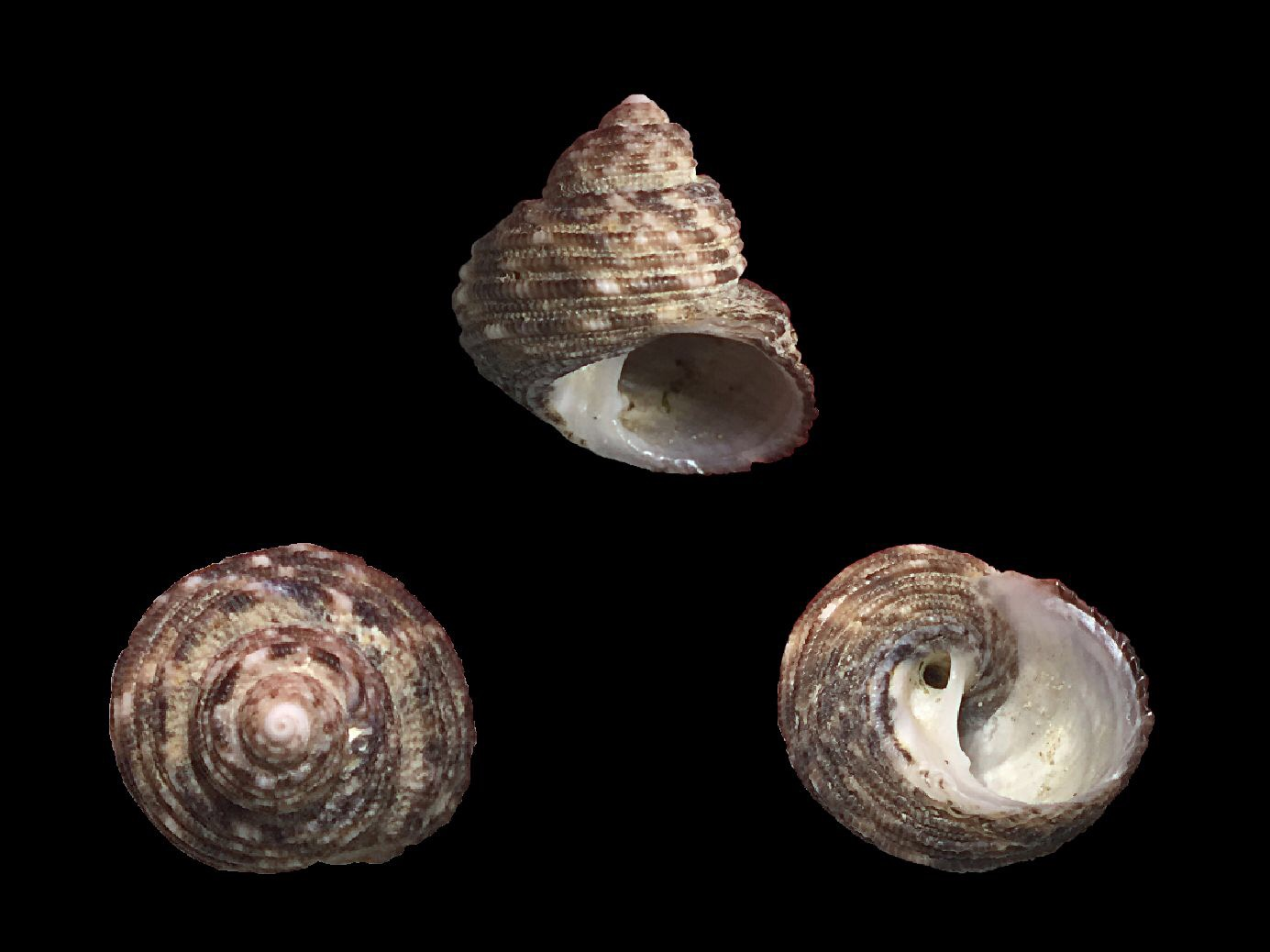
- Three views of Herpetopoma sulciferum shell

Scientific classification
- Kingdom: Animalia
- Phylum: Mollusca
- Class: Gastropoda
- Subclass: Vetigastropoda
- Family: Chilodontaidae
- Genus: Herpetopoma
- Species: H. sulciferum

Binomial name
- Herpetopoma sulciferum (A. Adams, 1853)

Synonyms
- Monodonta sulcifera A. Adams, 1853 (original combination)

= Herpetopoma sulciferum =

Species of gastropod

Herpetopoma sulciferum is a species of sea snail, a marine gastropod mollusc in the family Chilodontaidae.

== Description ==
(Original description by A. Adams, in Latin) "Testa globoso-conica, umbilicata, fusca, cingulis granorum distantium moniliformibus, interstitiis profunde sulcatis, sulcis sublaevis, longitudinaliter striatis ornata; columella ad basin trisulcata, dente parvo acuto instructa; labro tenui, intus sulcato."

== Distribution ==
This marine species occurs off Northwest Australia.
