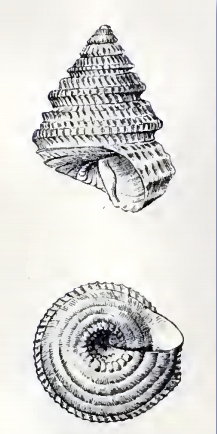
- Original drawing with two views of a shell of Dentistyla sericifilum

Scientific classification
- Kingdom: Animalia
- Phylum: Mollusca
- Class: Gastropoda
- Subclass: Vetigastropoda
- Family: Chilodontaidae
- Genus: Dentistyla
- Species: D. sericifilum

Binomial name
- Dentistyla sericifilum (Dall, 1889)

Synonyms
- Calliostoma (Dentistyla) sericifilum Dall, 1889 (original combination)

= Dentistyla sericifilum =

Species of gastropod

Dentistyla sericifilum is a species of sea snail, a marine gastropod mollusc in the family Chilodontaidae.

== Description ==
The height of the shell attains 9 mm. The shell is delicately but sharply reticulate all over. The two peripheral spirals are minutely spinose at the intersections. The columellar tooth is present but not strong. The shell is thinner and more nacreous than the typical form, and with the radiating and spiral sculpture not differing so much in strength.

== Distribution ==
This marine species occurs in the Caribbean Sea off the Grenadines and Barbados
