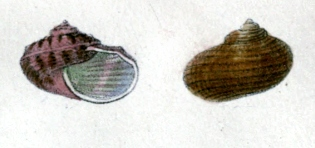
- Drawing with two views of a shell of Granata japonica

Scientific classification
- Kingdom: Animalia
- Phylum: Mollusca
- Class: Gastropoda
- Subclass: Vetigastropoda
- Family: Chilodontaidae
- Genus: Granata
- Species: G. japonica

Binomial name
- Granata japonica (A. Adams, 1850)

Synonyms
- Stomatella japonica A. Adams, 1850 (original combination)

= Granata japonica =

Species of gastropod

Granata japonica is a species of sea snail, a marine gastropod mollusc in the family Chilodontaidae.

== Description ==
(Original description by Adams) The brown, convex, imperforate shell has a suborbicular shape. It is transversely costulate. The riblets are close-set, and noduled. The interstices are very finely longitudinally striated. The spire is rather prominent. The rounded whorls are costate. The subcircular aperture is pearly within.

== Distribution ==
This marine species occurs off Japan.
