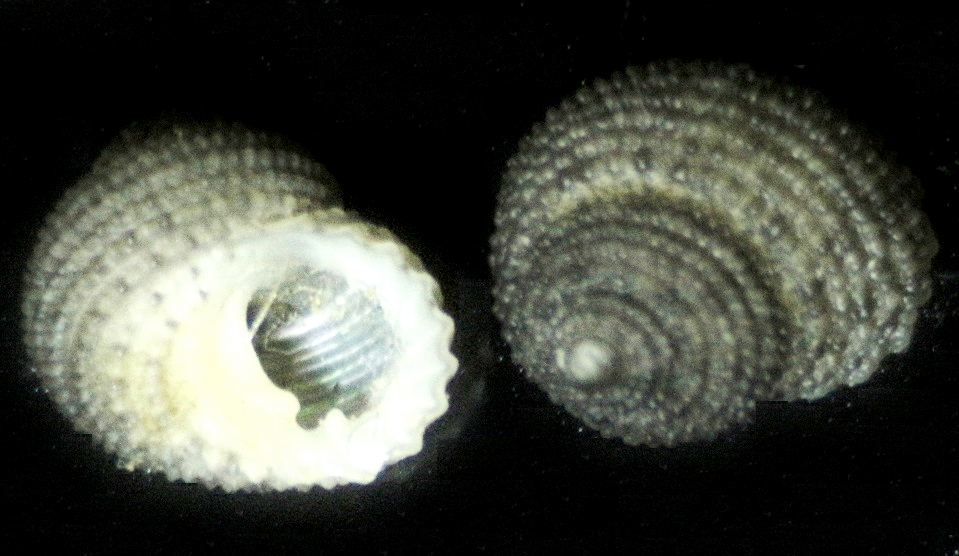
- Shells of Herpetopoma bellum

Scientific classification
- Kingdom: Animalia
- Phylum: Mollusca
- Class: Gastropoda
- Subclass: Vetigastropoda
- Family: Chilodontaidae
- Genus: Herpetopoma
- Species: H. bellum

Binomial name
- Herpetopoma bellum (Hutton, 1873)

Synonyms
- Euchelus bellus Hutton, 1873 (original combination); Herpetopoma bella [sic] (incorrect gender ending); Huttonia iricolor T. W. Kirk, 1882; Huttonia hamiltoni T. W. Kirk, 1882; Euchelus bellus Suter, 1913

= Herpetopoma bellum =

Species of gastropod

Herpetopoma bellum is a species of sea snails, marine gastropod mollusc in the family Chilodontaidae.

== Description ==
The size of the shell varies between 4 mm and 5.5 mm. The small, solid, thick shell has a globose-conic shape, evenly grained all over. it is blackish or pink varied with darker. It is imperforate when adult, and has a groove at the place of the umbilicus. The short spire is conic. The apical whorl is smooth, the following whorl has three granose lirae, the next with 3 or 4; the penultimate has 7 or 8 equal, grained lirae. The interstices are narrow. The body whorl has ten such lirae. The teleoconch contains 5 convex whorls. The last one is globose, descending at the aperture. The rounded aperture is nacre with steel-blue and dark red reflections. It is lirate inside. The concave columella terminates in a tooth, below which there is a narrow notch, and another tubercle or tooth on the basal lip equal in size to the columellar denticle.

== Distribution ==
This marine species occurs off New Zealand., Chatham Island and Tasmania.
