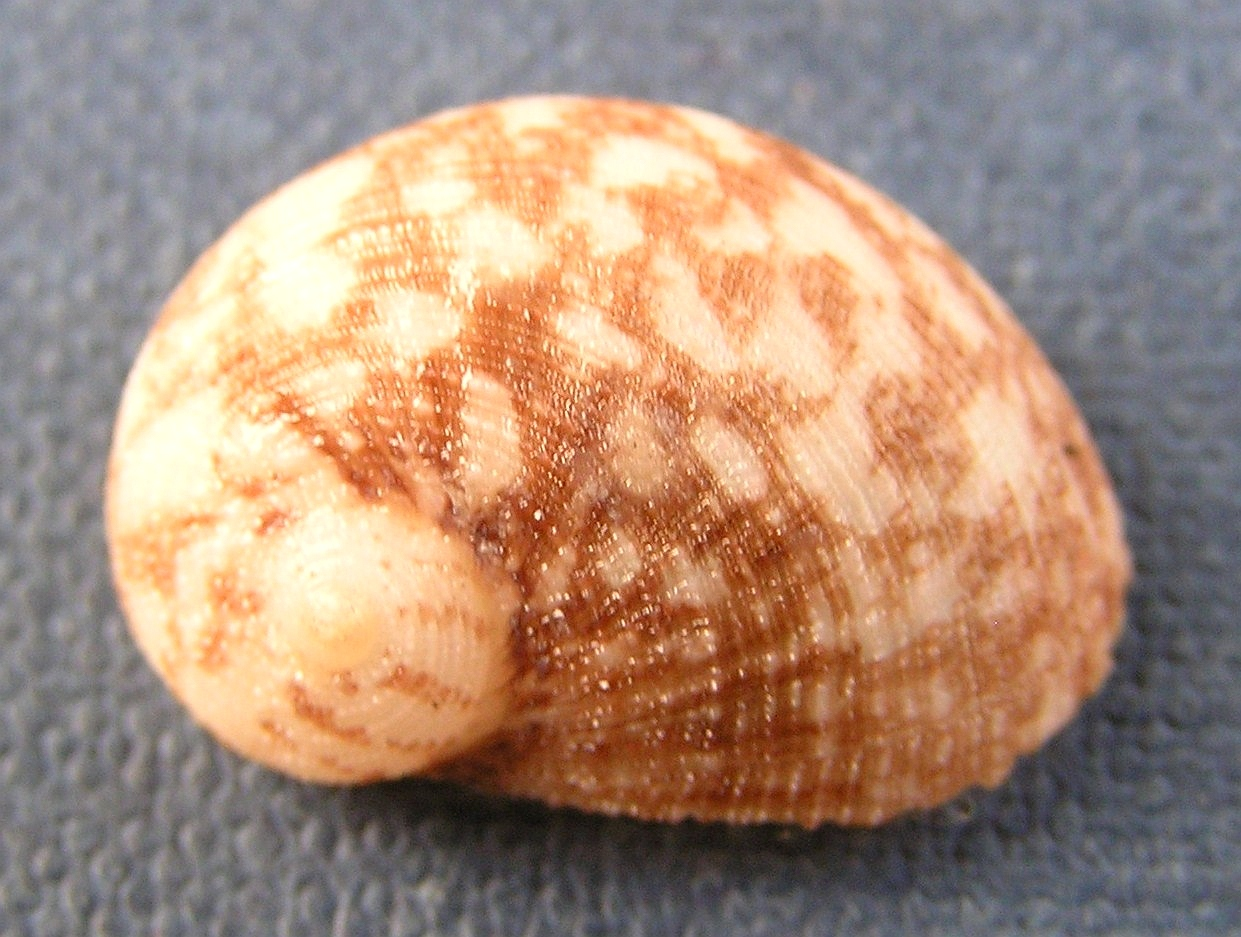
- A shell of Granata sulcifera
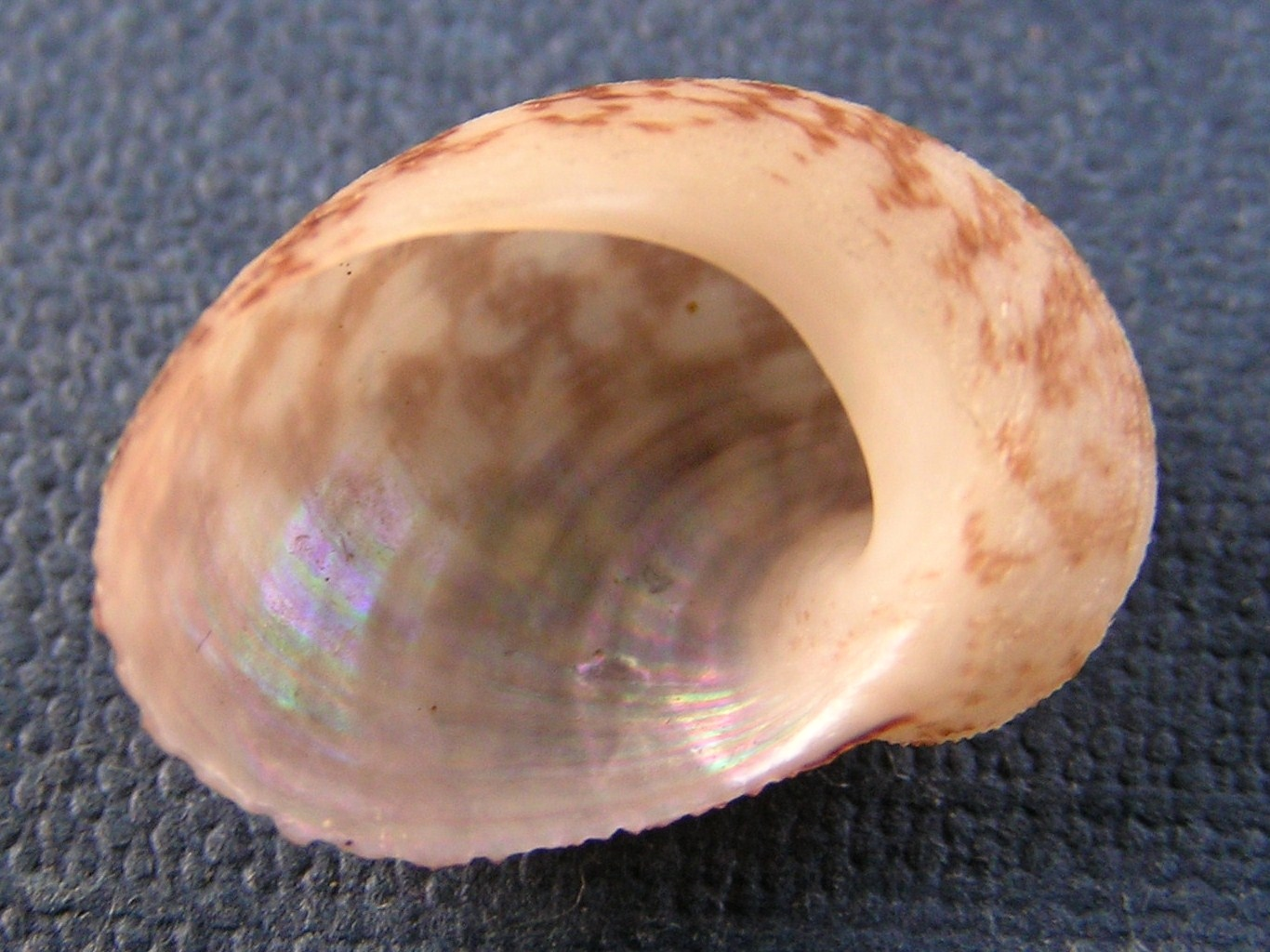
- Ventral view of a shell of Granata sulcifera

Scientific classification
- Kingdom: Animalia
- Phylum: Mollusca
- Class: Gastropoda
- Subclass: Vetigastropoda
- Family: Chilodontaidae
- Genus: Granata
- Species: G. sulcifera

Binomial name
- Granata sulcifera (Lamarck, 1822)

Synonyms
- Stomatella (Stomatella) sulcifera Lamarck, 1822; Stomatella articulata A. Adams, 1850; Stomatella sulcifera Lamarck, 1822 (basionym)

= Granata sulcifera =

Species of Gastropoda

Granata sulcifera is a species of small sea snail, a marine gastropod mollusc in the family Chilodontaidae.

== Description ==
The size of the shell varies between 17 mm and 23 mm. The rather thin shell has an orbicular shape. The short spire is conoidal. Its color is grayish or pinkish, with narrow reddish-brown irregular longitudinal stripes, often broken into dots on the spirals. The sculpture consists of narrow spiral riblets with interstitial smaller threads. The interstices are finely latticed by raised close longitudinal striae. The spire contains about four whorls with the last 1½ very rapidly widening, descending anteriorly. The large aperture is oblique, oval, lightly sulcate within and brilliantly iridescent, with red, skyblue and green reflections, neither predominating. The thin columella is arcuate, with a new-moon shaped flat white or slightly iridescent tract bounding it.

== Distribution ==
This species occurs in the Persian Gulf, in the Indian Ocean off Madagascar, Mozambique and Transkei, South Africa; off Lord Hood's Island, Australia.
