= Herpetopoma benthicola =

Scientific classification
- Kingdom: Animalia
- Phylum: Mollusca
- Class: Gastropoda
- Subclass: Vetigastropoda
- Family: Chilodontaidae
- Genus: Herpetopoma
- Species: H. benthicola

Binomial name
- Herpetopoma benthicola Powell, 1937

Species of gastropod

Herpetopoma benthicola is a species of sea snail, a marine gastropod mollusc in the family Chilodontaidae.

== Description ==
Shells of the species are small, solid and conic. Shells reach a height of 3.5 mm (0.14 in) and a width of 3.0 mm (0.12 in).

== Taxonomy ==
The species was first described by A. W. B. Powell in 1937.

== Distribution ==
The species is endemic to New Zealand, found off the coast of Manawatāwhi / Three Kings Islands and the north-eastern North Island between Cape Reinga and the Bay of Islands, at depths ranging between 30–622 m (98–2,041 ft).
