= Herpetopoma howensis =

Scientific classification
- Kingdom: Animalia
- Phylum: Mollusca
- Class: Gastropoda
- Subclass: Vetigastropoda
- Family: Chilodontaidae
- Genus: Herpetopoma
- Species: H. howensis

Binomial name
- Herpetopoma howensis Jansen, 1994

Species of gastropod

Herpetopoma howensis is a species of sea snail, a marine gastropod mollusc in the family Chilodontaidae.

== Distribution ==
This marine species occurs in the Tasman Sea off Lord Howe Island.
