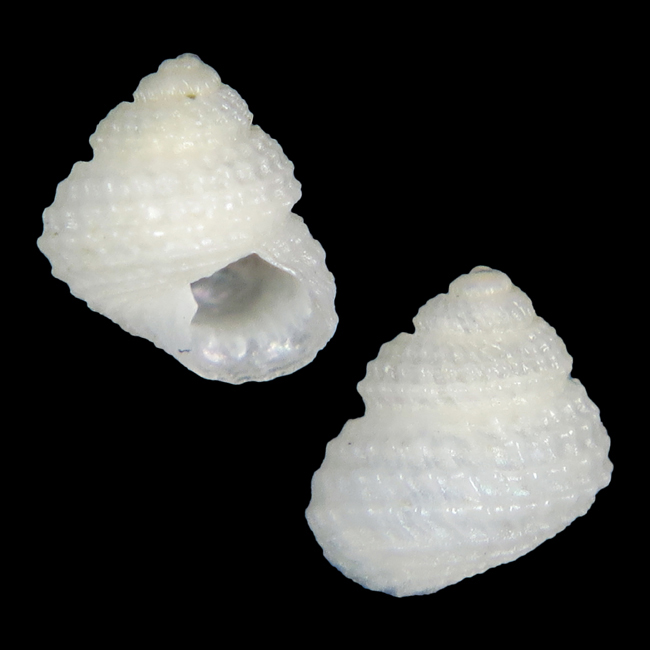

Scientific classification
- Kingdom: Animalia
- Phylum: Mollusca
- Class: Gastropoda
- Subclass: Vetigastropoda
- Family: Chilodontaidae
- Genus: Herpetopoma
- Species: H. naokoae

Binomial name
- Herpetopoma naokoae Poppe, Tagaro & Dekker, 2006

= Herpetopoma naokoae =

Species of gastropod

Herpetopoma naokoae is a species of sea snail, a marine gastropod mollusc in the family Chilodontaidae.

== Description ==
The size of the shell varies between 2.5 mm and 3.6 mm.

== Distribution ==
This marine species occurs off the Philippines.
