= Herpetopoma alacerrimum =

Scientific classification
- Kingdom: Animalia
- Phylum: Mollusca
- Class: Gastropoda
- Subclass: Vetigastropoda
- Family: Chilodontaidae
- Genus: Herpetopoma
- Species: H. alacerrimum

Binomial name
- Herpetopoma alacerrimum Dell, 1956

Synonyms
- Herpetopoma larochei alacerrima Dell, 1956

Species of gastropod

Herpetopoma alacerrimum is a species of sea snail, a marine gastropod mollusk in the family Chilodontaidae.

== Distribution ==
This marine species occurs off New Zealand.
