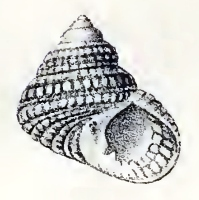
- Drawing with an apertural view of a shell of Herpetopoma scabriusculum

Scientific classification
- Kingdom: Animalia
- Phylum: Mollusca
- Class: Gastropoda
- Subclass: Vetigastropoda
- Family: Chilodontaidae
- Genus: Herpetopoma
- Species: H. scabriusculum

Binomial name
- Herpetopoma scabriusculum (A. Adams & Angas, 1867)

Synonyms
- Euchelus scabriusculus A. Adams & Angas, 1867 (original combination); Euchelus tasmanicus Tenison-Woods, J.E., 1876; Trochus scabriusculus Adams

= Herpetopoma scabriusculum =

Species of gastropod

Herpetopoma scabriusculum, common name the rough top shell, is a species of sea snail, a marine gastropod mollusc in the family Chilodontaidae.

== Description ==
The height of the shell attains 5.5 mm. The small, very minutely perforate, thick shell has a conoidal shape. It is, ashen reddish. The five whorls are separated by canaliculate sutures, convex, the embryonic ones smooth, the rest roughened. The whorls are spirally cingulate, with four unequal cinguli on the penultimate whorl, the upper two smaller, the third forming a carina. There is sometimes a delicate riblet between the 3d and 4th lirae. The body whorl is subrotund, with unequal, alternating cinguli. The base of the shell is convex, with 5-6 concentric beaded cinguli. The interstices are clathrate. The aperture is subovate, sulcate inside. The thick outer lip is duplicate. The basal margin is plicate-dentate, and deeply notched. The columellar callous is a little reflexed above, passing into the right margin. The operculum is multispiral.

== Distribution ==
This marine species occurs off New South Wales and South Australia.
