= Herpetopoma vixumbilicatum =

Scientific classification
- Kingdom: Animalia
- Phylum: Mollusca
- Class: Gastropoda
- Subclass: Vetigastropoda
- Family: Chilodontaidae
- Genus: Herpetopoma
- Species: H. vixumbilicatum

Binomial name
- Herpetopoma vixumbilicatum (Tate, 1893)

Species of gastropod

Herpetopoma vixumbilicatum is a species of sea snail, a marine gastropod mollusc in the family Chilodontaidae.

== Description ==
The size of the shell varies between 3 mm and 6 mm.

== Distribution ==
This marine species occurs off Victoria and Western Australia.
