= Herpetopoma pruinosum =

Scientific classification
- Kingdom: Animalia
- Phylum: Mollusca
- Class: Gastropoda
- Subclass: Vetigastropoda
- Family: Chilodontaidae
- Genus: Herpetopoma
- Species: H. pruinosum

Binomial name
- Herpetopoma pruinosum (B. A. Marshall, 1979)

Synonyms
- Euchelus (Herpetopoma) pruinosus Marshall, 1979

Species of gastropod

Herpetopoma pruinosum is a species of sea snail, a marine gastropod mollusc in the family Chilodontaidae.

== Distribution ==
This marine species occurs off the Kermadec Islands, New Zealand.
