= Mirachelus urueuauau =

Scientific classification
- Kingdom: Animalia
- Phylum: Mollusca
- Class: Gastropoda
- Subclass: Vetigastropoda
- Family: Chilodontaidae
- Genus: Mirachelus
- Species: M. urueuauau

Binomial name
- Mirachelus urueuauau Absalao, 2009

Species of gastropod

Mirachelus urueuauau is a species of sea snail, a marine gastropod mollusc in the family Chilodontaidae.
