= Herpetopoma annectans =

Scientific classification
- Kingdom: Animalia
- Phylum: Mollusca
- Class: Gastropoda
- Subclass: Vetigastropoda
- Family: Chilodontaidae
- Genus: Herpetopoma
- Species: H. annectans

Binomial name
- Herpetopoma annectans (Tate, 1893)

Species of gastropod

Herpetopoma annectans is a species of sea snail, a marine gastropod mollusc in the family Chilodontaidae.

== Description ==
The height of the shell attains 5 mm.

== Distribution ==
This marine species occurs off Western Australia and South Australia.
