= Herpetopoma corallinum =

Scientific classification
- Kingdom: Animalia
- Phylum: Mollusca
- Class: Gastropoda
- Subclass: Vetigastropoda
- Family: Chilodontaidae
- Genus: Herpetopoma
- Species: H. corallinum

Binomial name
- Herpetopoma corallinum Jansen, 1994

Species of gastropod

Herpetopoma corallinum is a species of sea snail, a marine gastropod mollusc in the family Chilodontaidae.

== Distribution ==
This marine species occurs in the Great Barrier Reef.
