= Herpetopoma larochei =

Scientific classification
- Kingdom: Animalia
- Phylum: Mollusca
- Class: Gastropoda
- Subclass: Vetigastropoda
- Family: Chilodontaidae
- Genus: Herpetopoma
- Species: H. larochei

Binomial name
- Herpetopoma larochei (Powell, 1926)

Species of gastropod

Herpetopoma larochei is a species of sea snail, a marine gastropod mollusc in the family Chilodontaidae.

== Distribution ==
This species occurs in New Zealand.
