= Herpetopoma helix =

Scientific classification
- Kingdom: Animalia
- Phylum: Mollusca
- Class: Gastropoda
- Subclass: Vetigastropoda
- Family: Chilodontaidae
- Genus: Herpetopoma
- Species: H. helix

Binomial name
- Herpetopoma helix (Barnard, 1964)

Synonyms
- Turcica helix Barnard, 1964

Species of gastropod

Herpetopoma helix is a species of sea snail, a marine gastropod mollusc in the family Chilodontaidae.

== Description ==
The height of the shell attains 4 mm.

== Distribution ==
This species occurs in the Indian Ocean off KwaZuluNatal, Rep. South Africa, to Madagascar.
