= Mirachelus clinocnemus =

Scientific classification
- Kingdom: Animalia
- Phylum: Mollusca
- Class: Gastropoda
- Subclass: Vetigastropoda
- Family: Chilodontaidae
- Genus: Mirachelus
- Species: M. clinocnemus

Binomial name
- Mirachelus clinocnemus Quinn, 1979

Species of gastropod

Mirachelus clinocnemus is a species of sea snail, a marine gastropod mollusc in the family Chilodontaidae.

== Description ==
The size of the shell varies between 2 mm and 4.5 mm.

== Distribution ==
This species occurs in the Atlantic Ocean from Florida to Eastern Brazil.
