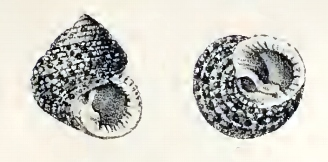
- Drawing with two views of a shell of Herpetopoma gemmatum

Scientific classification
- Kingdom: Animalia
- Phylum: Mollusca
- Class: Gastropoda
- Subclass: Vetigastropoda
- Family: Chilodontaidae
- Genus: Herpetopoma
- Species: H. gemmatum

Binomial name
- Herpetopoma gemmatum (Gould, 1845)

Synonyms
- Clanculus gemmatus (Gould, 1845); Euchelus fischeri (Montrouzier, 1866); Euchelus gemmatus (Gould, 1845); Monodonta fischeri Montrouzier, 1866; Trochus (Monodonta) gemmatus Gould, 1845 (original combination)

= Herpetopoma gemmatum =

Species of gastropod

Herpetopoma gemmatum is a species of sea snail, a marine gastropod mollusc in the family Chilodontaidae.

== Description ==
The size of the shell varies between 4 mm and 8 mm. The small, solid and thick shell has a globose conic shape. It is pinkish, or ashen-pink, irregularly dotted or longitudinally striped with dull red. The short spire is acutely conic. The sutures are narrowly canaliculate. The five, convex whorls are encircled by numerous closely finely granose riblets, usually 12–14 in number on the body whorl, the interstices with oblique raised striae or not visibly sculptured. The rounded body whorl is globose. The aperture is rounded. The thick outer lip is lirate inside. The short columella is, straightened, and obtusely subtuberculate in the middle, ending in a projecting tooth, between which and the basal margin there is a deep narrow notch. The umbilicus is narrow.

The ground color varies from nearly white to ashen-pink. On the darker forms the dots are obscure, and they appear unicolored, of a dingy pinkish hue. There seems to be great variation in the number and development of the spiral grained riblets. The ribs sometimes alternate in size on the median part of the last whorl.

== Distribution ==
This species occurs in the Red Sea and in the Indian Ocean off Réunion; in the Pacific off Hawaii and Queensland, Australia.
