= Mirachelus galapagensis =

Scientific classification
- Kingdom: Animalia
- Phylum: Mollusca
- Class: Gastropoda
- Subclass: Vetigastropoda
- Family: Chilodontaidae
- Genus: Mirachelus
- Species: M. galapagensis

Binomial name
- Mirachelus galapagensis McLean, 1970

Species of gastropod

Mirachelus galapagensis is a species of sea snail, a marine gastropod mollusc in the family Chilodontaidae.

== Description ==
The height of the shell attains 3.5 mm. While the diameter is 2.9 mm.

== Distribution ==
This species occurs in the Pacific Ocean off the Galapagos Islands and off Cocos Island, Costa Rica at waters less than 200m in depth.
