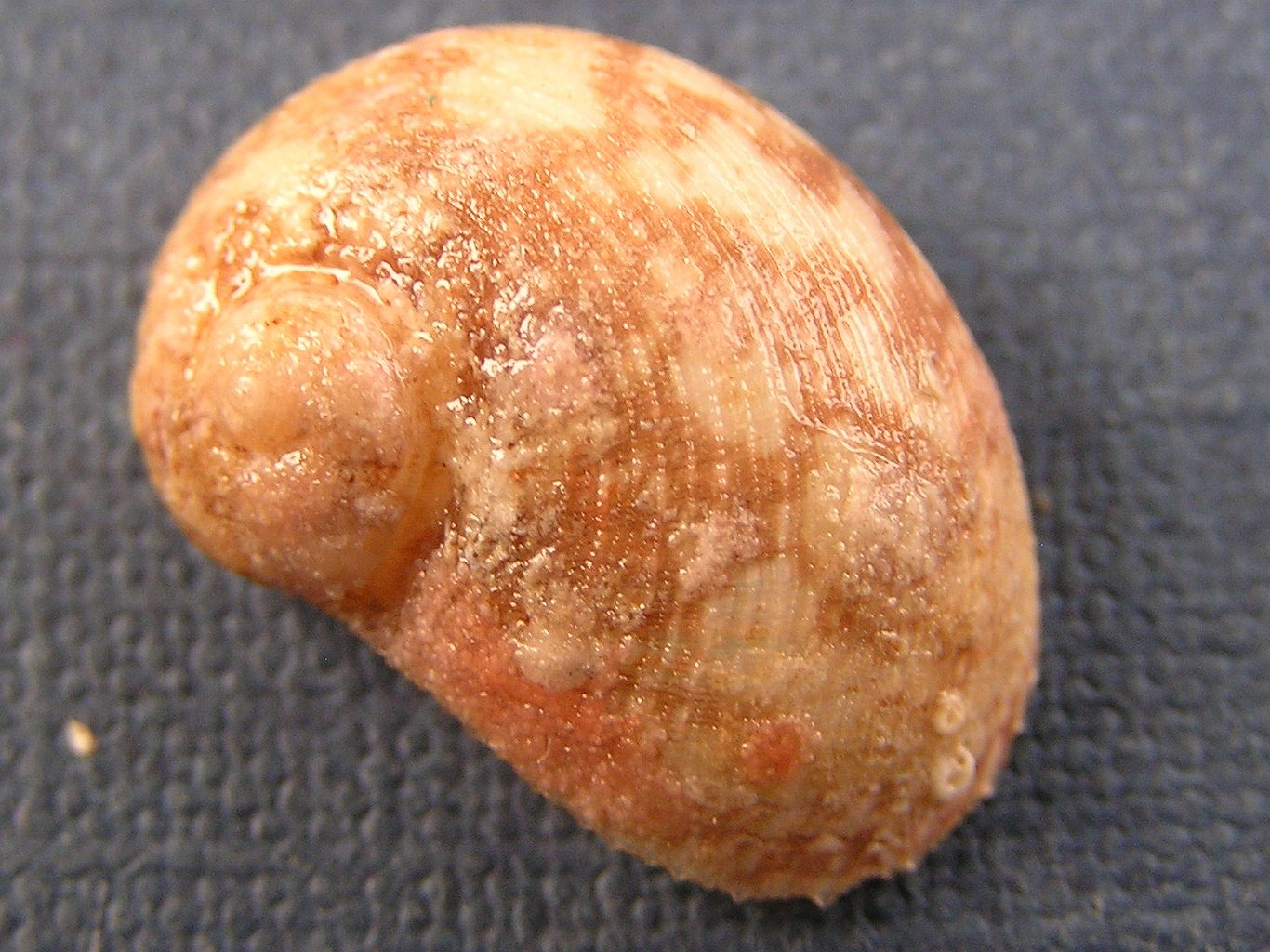
- A shell of Granata maculata
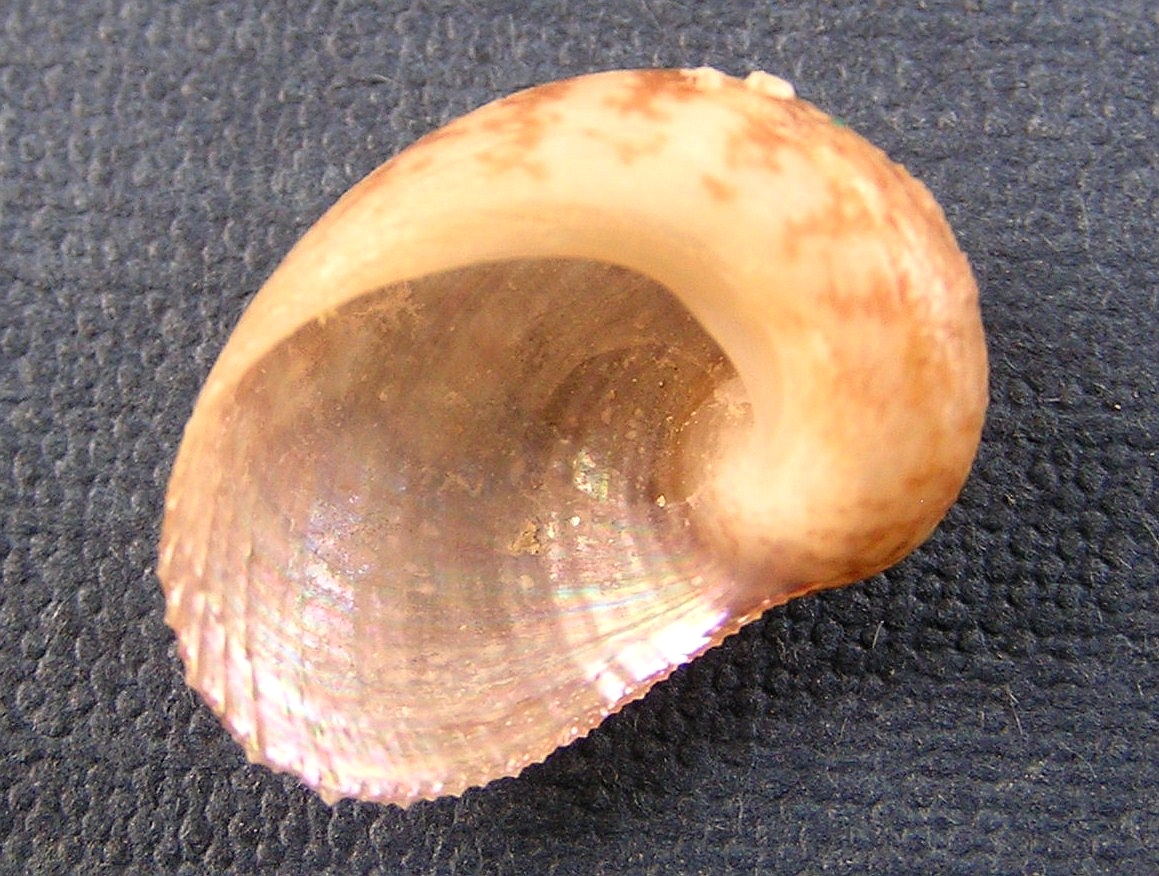
- Ventral view of a shell of Granata maculata

Scientific classification
- Kingdom: Animalia
- Phylum: Mollusca
- Class: Gastropoda
- Subclass: Vetigastropoda
- Family: Chilodontaidae
- Genus: Granata
- Species: G. maculata

Binomial name
- Granata maculata (Quoy & Gaimard, 1834)

Synonyms
- Pseudostomatella maculata (Quoy & Gaimard, 1834); Stomatella maculata Quoy & Gaimard, 1834 (original combination)

= Granata maculata =

Species of gastropod

Granata maculata is a species of small sea snail, a marine gastropod mollusc in the family Chilodontaidae.

== Description ==
The small, oval shell is inflated. It has a rounded prominent spire containing 4 whorls. It is very delicately striate longitudinally and transversely. It is pale yellow, marbled with brown and reddish brown. The columellar margin is flattened. The regularly oval aperture is nacreous and striate within. The operculum is very thin.

== Distribution ==
This species occurs in the Pacific Ocean off Vanikoro and the Torres Strait.
