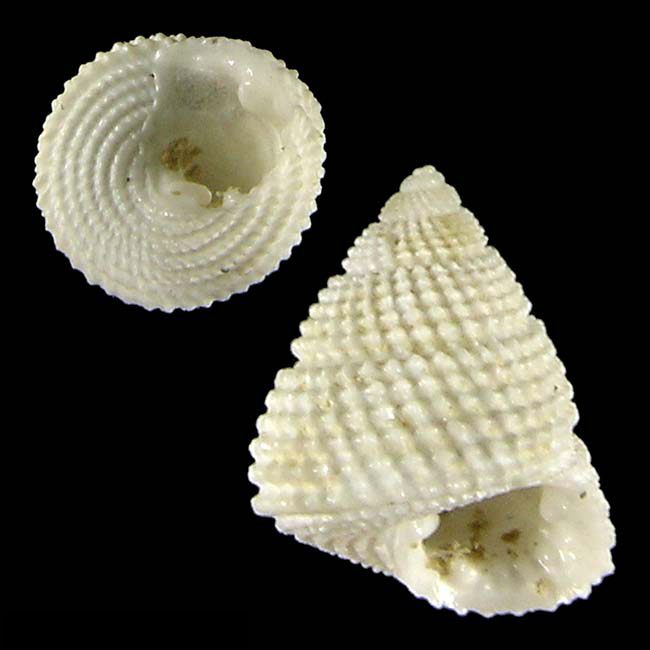

Scientific classification
- Kingdom: Animalia
- Phylum: Mollusca
- Class: Gastropoda
- Subclass: Vetigastropoda
- Family: Chilodontaidae
- Genus: Chilodonta
- Species: C. suduirauti

Binomial name
- Chilodonta suduirauti Poppe, Tagaro & Dekker, 2006

= Chilodonta suduirauti =

Species of gastropod

Chilodonta suduirauti is a species of sea snail, a marine gastropod mollusk in the family Chilodontaidae.

Members of the order Vestigastropoda are both simultaneous hermaphrodites and dioecious species.

== Description ==
The height of the shell attains 8 mm. The shell is off-white in color with small bumps lining the shell that are rigid to the touch.

== Distribution ==
This marine species occurs off the Philippines. It is found in tropical environments.
