= Herpetopoma crassilabrum =

Scientific classification
- Kingdom: Animalia
- Phylum: Mollusca
- Class: Gastropoda
- Subclass: Vetigastropoda
- Family: Chilodontaidae
- Genus: Herpetopoma
- Species: H. crassilabrum

Binomial name
- Herpetopoma crassilabrum (G. B. Sowerby III, 1905)

Synonyms
- Clanculus crassilabrum Sowerby III,1905

Species of mollusc (sea snail)

Herpetopoma crassilabrum is a species of sea snail, a marine gastropod mollusc in the family Chilodontaidae.

== Distribution ==
This marine species occurs off Sri Lanka.
