= Dentistyla asperrima =

Scientific classification
- Kingdom: Animalia
- Phylum: Mollusca
- Class: Gastropoda
- Subclass: Vetigastropoda
- Family: Chilodontaidae
- Genus: Dentistyla
- Species: D. asperrima

Binomial name
- Dentistyla asperrima (Dall, 1881)

Synonyms
- Calliostoma (Dentistyla) asperrimum (Dall, 1881); Margarita asperrima Dall, 1881 (original combination)

Species of gastropod

Dentistyla asperrima is a species of sea snail, a marine gastropod mollusc in the family Chilodontaidae.

== Description ==
The size of the shell varies between 4 mm and 8.5 mm. There is a small tooth on the columella.

== Distribution ==
This species occurs in the Caribbean Sea, the Gulf of Mexico and the Lesser Antilles.
