= Herpetopoma elevatum =

Scientific classification
- Kingdom: Animalia
- Phylum: Mollusca
- Class: Gastropoda
- Subclass: Vetigastropoda
- Family: Chilodontaidae
- Genus: Herpetopoma
- Species: H. elevatum

Binomial name
- Herpetopoma elevatum Jansen, 1994

Species of gastropod

Herpetopoma elevatum is a species of sea snail, a marine gastropod mollusc in the family Chilodontaidae.
