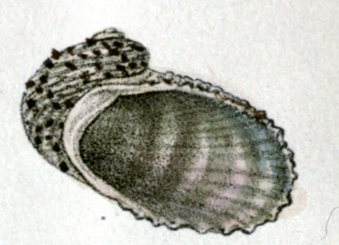
- Drawing with an apertural view of a shell of Granata cumingii

Scientific classification
- Kingdom: Animalia
- Phylum: Mollusca
- Class: Gastropoda
- Subclass: Vetigastropoda
- Family: Chilodontaidae
- Genus: Granata
- Species: G. cumingii

Binomial name
- Granata cumingii (A. Adams, 1854)

Synonyms
- Stomatella cumingii A. Adams, 1854; Stomatia cumingii Chenu 1959

= Granata cumingii =

Species of gastropod

Granata cumingii is a species of sea snail, a marine gastropod mollusc in the family Chilodontaidae.

== Description ==
The size of the shell varies between 15 mm and 32 mm. The imperforate shell has an auriform shape. The spire is depressed. The glistening shell has a cream ground color dotted with reddish or reddish-brown spots. The axial sculpture is somewhat coarse. The axial plications are crisp and regular. It is transversely spirally ribbed. The ribs are elevated, subequal, crenelated, articulated with reddish brown. The interstices are ornamented with delicate longitudinal lamellae. The aperture is very broad and has an elongate, ovoidal shape. It is sulcate within. The inner lip is subreflexed.

It has been described as a large and elegant species, with a peculiar yellowish glistening tinge in the intervals between the spiral rugose ribs. The aperture is very transverse, and the inner lip is reflexed on the columella.

== Distribution ==
This species occurs in the tropical Indian Ocean off Southern Kenya to Southern Madagascar and northern Mozambique at low shore, living under rocks.
