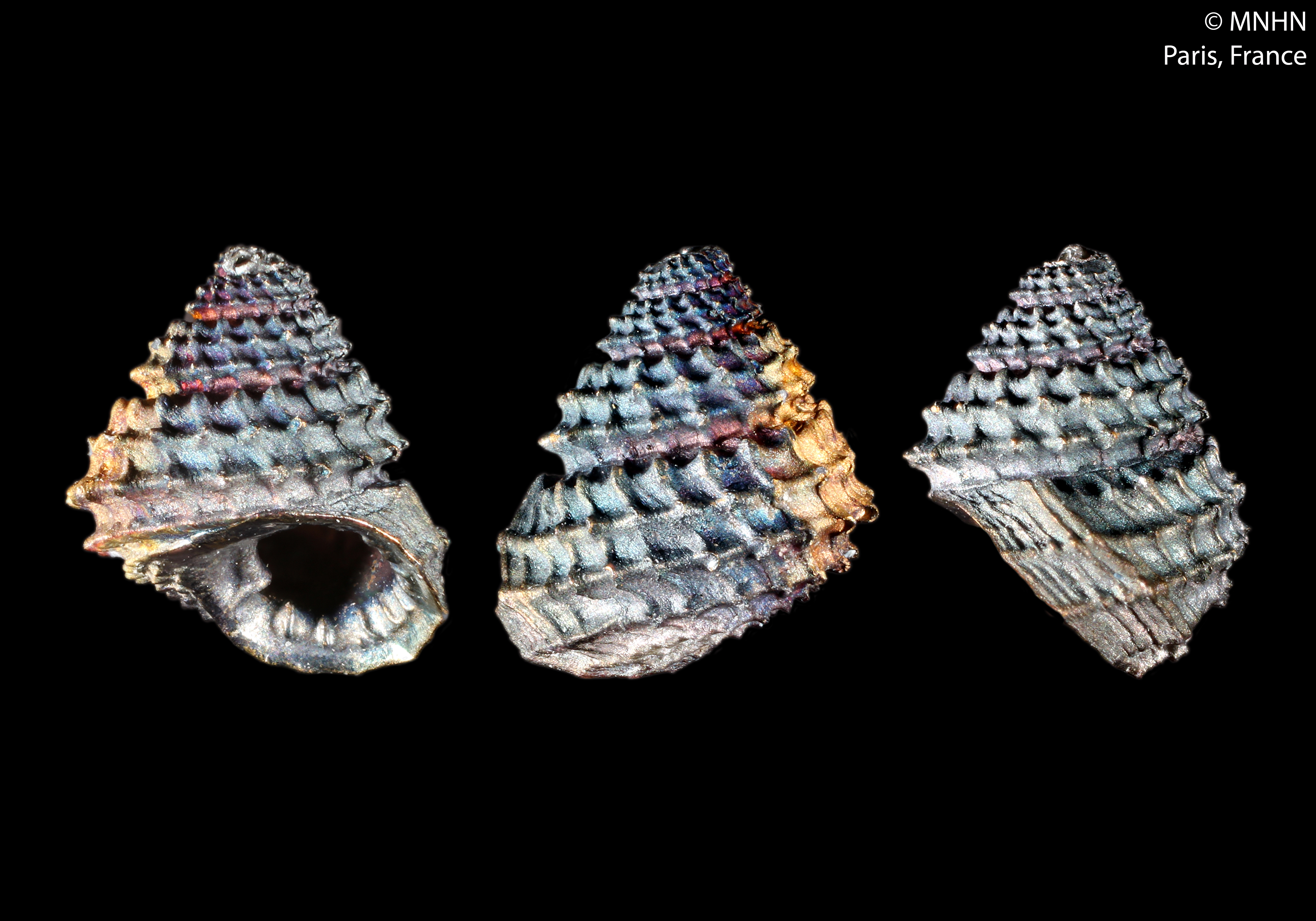
- Pholidotrope gloriosa

Scientific classification
- Kingdom: Animalia
- Phylum: Mollusca
- Class: Gastropoda
- Subclass: Vetigastropoda
- Family: Chilodontaidae
- Genus: Pholidotrope
- Species: P. gloriosa

Binomial name
- Pholidotrope gloriosa Herbert, 2012

= Pholidotrope gloriosa =

Species of gastropod

Pholidotrope gloriosa is a species of sea snail, a marine gastropod mollusc in the family Chilodontaidae.

== Description ==
The height of the shell attains 5 mm.

== Distribution ==
This species occurs in the Indian Ocean off northwest Madagascar.
