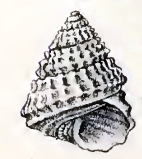
- Mirachelus corbis

Scientific classification
- Kingdom: Animalia
- Phylum: Mollusca
- Class: Gastropoda
- Subclass: Vetigastropoda
- Family: Chilodontaidae
- Genus: Mirachelus; Woodring, 1928

Type species
- Calliostoma corbis Dall, 1889</

= Mirachelus =

Genus of gastropods

Mirachelus is a genus of sea snails and marine gastropod molluscs in the family Chilodontaidae.

== Species ==
Species within the genus Mirachelus include:

- Mirachelus acanthus Quinn, 1991
- Mirachelus clinocnemus Quinn, 1979
- Mirachelus corbis (Dall, 1889)
- Mirachelus galapagensis McLean, 1970
- Mirachelus urueuauau Absalao, 2009
