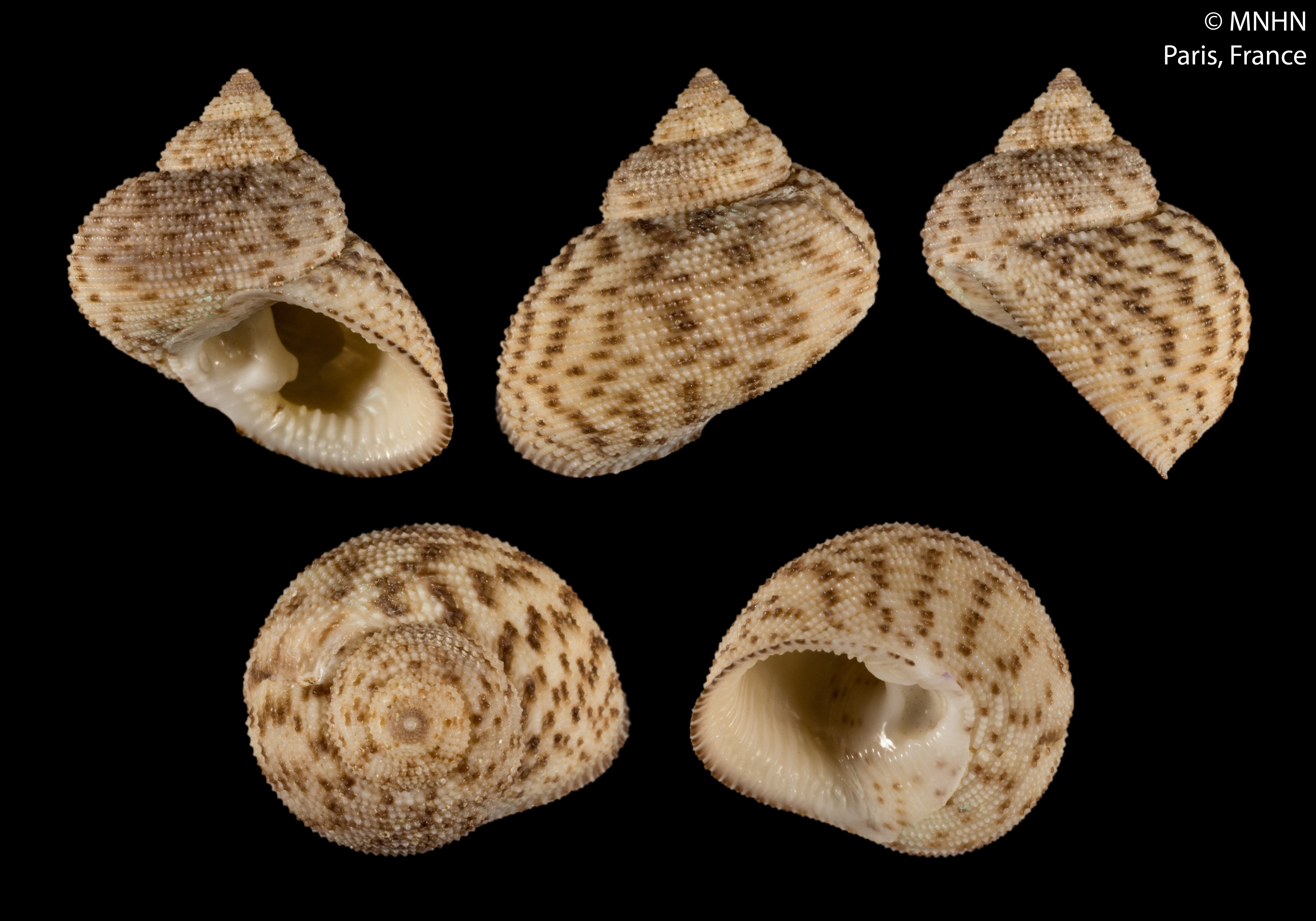
- Shell of Ascetostoma pteroton (holotype at MNHN, Paris)

Scientific classification
- Kingdom: Animalia
- Phylum: Mollusca
- Class: Gastropoda
- Subclass: Vetigastropoda
- Superfamily: Seguenzioidea
- Family: Chilodontaidae
- Genus: Ascetostoma; Herbert, 2012

Type species
- Euchelus providentiae Melvill, 1909

= Ascetostoma =

Genus of gastropods

Ascetostoma is a genus of mostly small deep water sea snails, marine gastropod molluscs in the family Chilodontaidae.

== Species ==
Species within the genus Ascetostoma include:

- Ascetostoma providentiae (Melvill, 1909)
- Ascetostoma pteroton Vilvens, 2017
- Ascetostoma ringens (Schepman, 1908)
