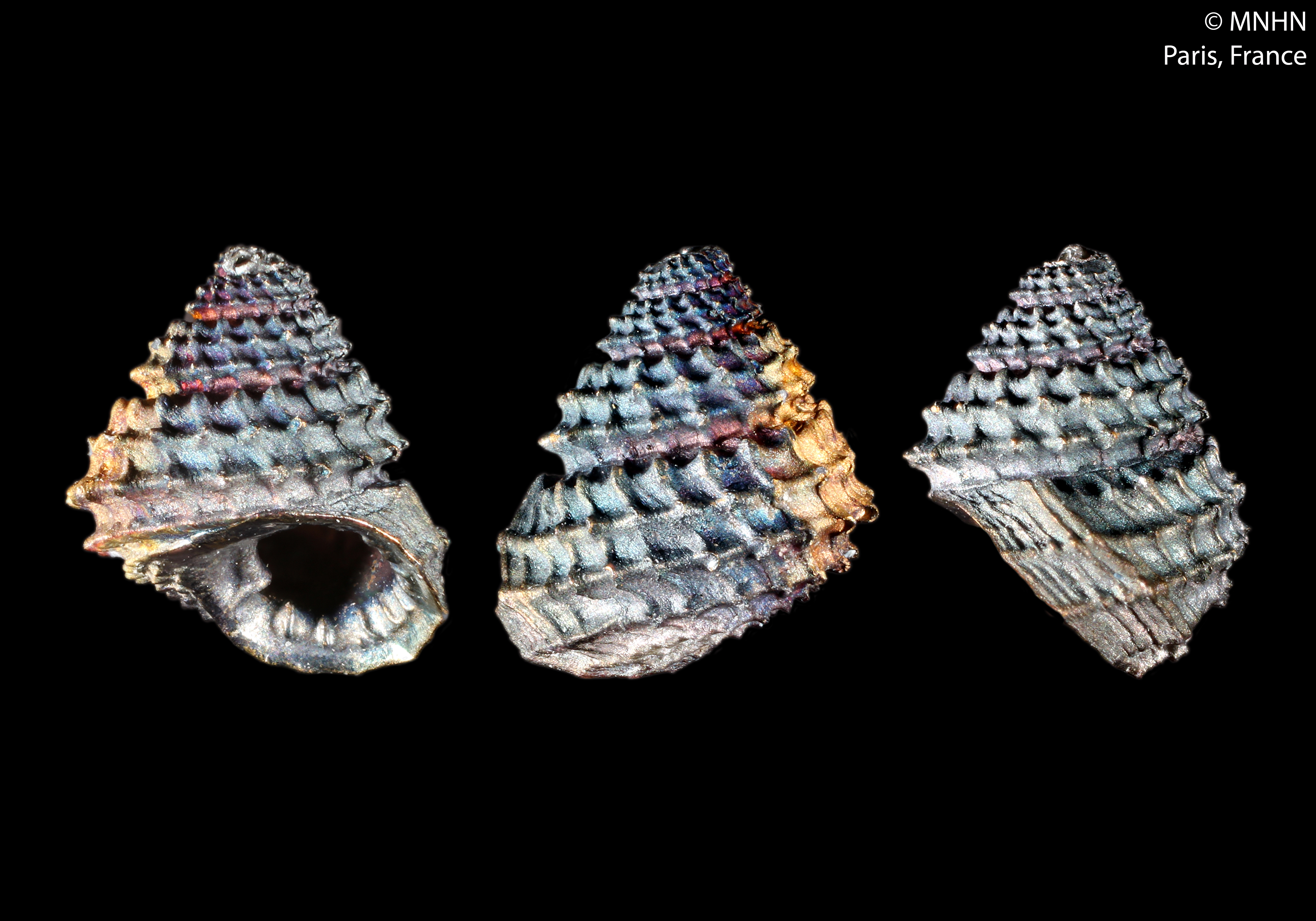
- Pholidotrope gloriosa

Scientific classification
- Kingdom: Animalia
- Phylum: Mollusca
- Class: Gastropoda
- Subclass: Vetigastropoda
- Superfamily: Seguenzioidea
- Family: Chilodontaidae
- Genus: Pholidotrope; Herbert, 2012

= Pholidotrope =

Genus of gastropods

Pholidotrope is a genus of mostly small deep water sea snails, marine gastropod molluscs in the family Chilodontaidae.

== Species ==
Species within the genus Pholidotrope include:

- Pholidotrope asteroeides Vilvens, 2017
- Pholidotrope choiseulensis Vilvens, 2017
- Pholidotrope gloriosa Herbert, 2012
