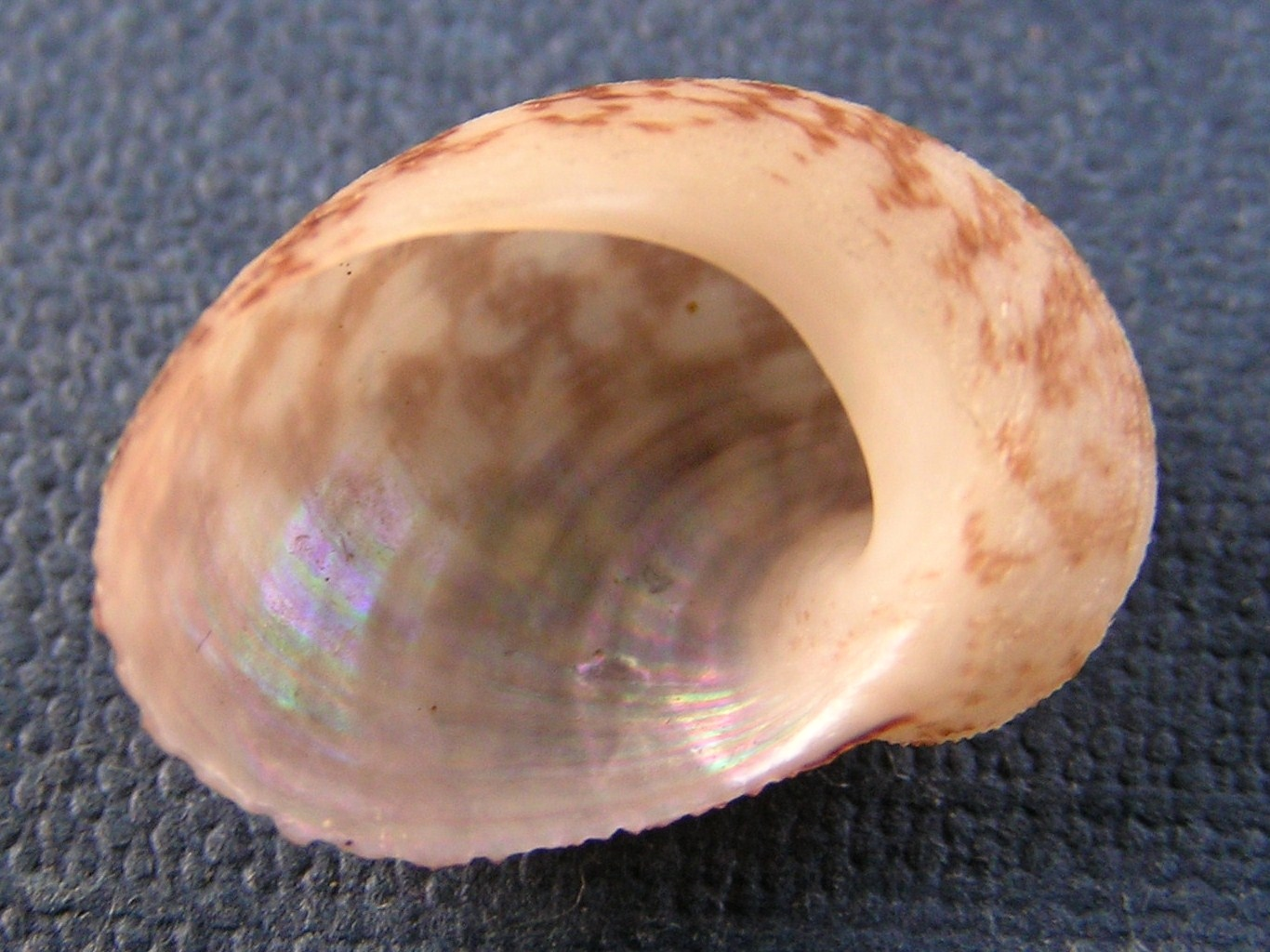
- Ventral view of a shell of Granata sulcifera

Scientific classification
- Kingdom: Animalia
- Phylum: Mollusca
- Class: Gastropoda
- Subclass: Vetigastropoda
- Family: Chilodontaidae
- Genus: Granata; Cotton, 1957

Type species
- Stomatella imbricata Lamarck, 1816

= Granata (gastropod) =

Genus of gastropods

Granata is a genus of small sea snails, marine gastropod molluscs in the family Chilodontaidae (formerly in the family Trochidae, the top snails).

== Species ==
Species within the genus Granata include:

- Granata cumingii (A. Adams, 1854)
- Granata imbricata (Lamarck, 1816)
- Granata japonica (A. Adams, 1850)
- Granata lyrata Pilsbry, 1890
- Granata maculata (Quoy & Gaimard, 1834)
- Granata sulcifera (Lamarck, 1822)

Species brought into synonymy

- Granata elegans (Gray, 1847): synonym of Stomatella elegans Gray, 1847 (superseded combination)
