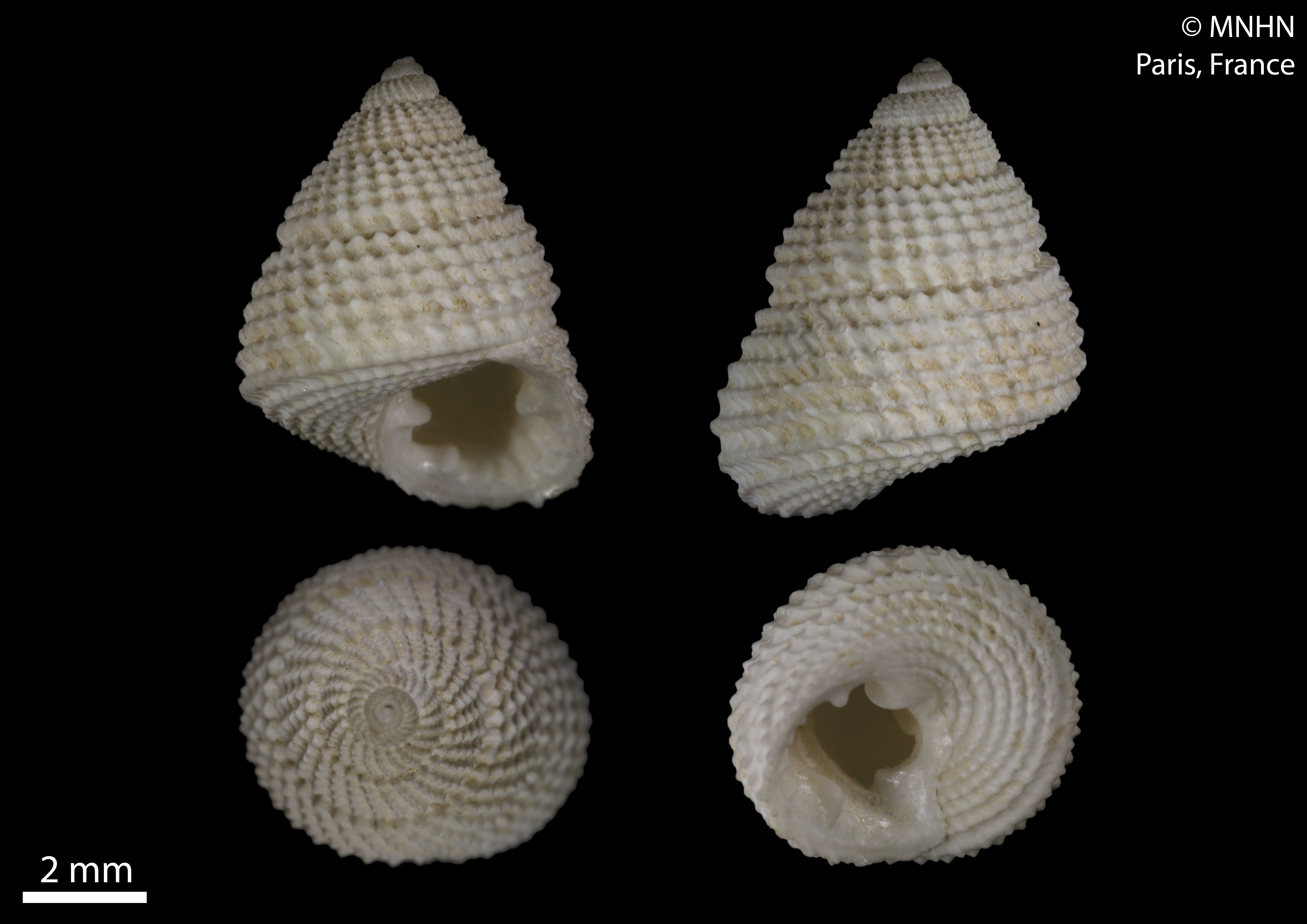
- Shell of Chilodonta suduirauti (paratype at MNHN, Paris)

Scientific classification
- Kingdom: Animalia
- Phylum: Mollusca
- Class: Gastropoda
- Subclass: Vetigastropoda
- Family: Chilodontaidae
- Genus: Chilodonta; Etallon, 1862

= Chilodonta =

Genus of gastropods

Chilodonta is a genus of sea snails, marine gastropod molluscs in the family Chilodontaidae.

== Species ==
Species within the genus Chilodonta include:

- Chilodonta suduirauti Poppe, Tagaro & Dekker, 2006
