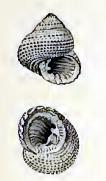
- Drawing showing two views of a shell of Acetostoma providentiae

Scientific classification
- Kingdom: Animalia
- Phylum: Mollusca
- Class: Gastropoda
- Subclass: Vetigastropoda
- Family: Chilodontaidae
- Genus: Ascetostoma
- Species: A. providentiae

Binomial name
- Ascetostoma providentiae (Melvill, 1909)

Synonyms
- Euchelus providentiae Melvill, 1909; Herpetopoma providentiae (Melvill, 1909)

= Ascetostoma providentiae =

Species of gastropod

Ascetostoma providentiae is a species of sea snail, a marine gastropod mollusc in the family Chilodontaidae.

== Distribution ==
This species occurs in the southwest Indian Ocean.
