= Herpetopoma fenestratum =

Scientific classification
- Kingdom: Animalia
- Phylum: Mollusca
- Class: Gastropoda
- Subclass: Vetigastropoda
- Family: Chilodontaidae
- Genus: Herpetopoma
- Species: H. fenestratum

Binomial name
- Herpetopoma fenestratum (Tate, 1893)

Synonyms
- Euchelus fenestrata Tate, 1893 (original combination)

Species of gastropod

Herpetopoma fenestratum is a species of sea snail, a marine gastropod mollusc in the family Chilodontaidae.

== Description ==
The height of the shell attains 4 mm.

== Distribution ==
This marine species occurs off South Australia and Western Australia.
