= Ascetostoma ringens =

Scientific classification
- Kingdom: Animalia
- Phylum: Mollusca
- Class: Gastropoda
- Subclass: Vetigastropoda
- Family: Chilodontaidae
- Genus: Ascetostoma
- Species: A. ringens

Binomial name
- Ascetostoma ringens (Schepman, 1908)

Synonyms
- Euchelus ringens Schepman, 1908; Herpetopoma ringens (Schepman, 1908)

Species of gastropod

Ascetostoma ringens is a species of sea snail, a marine gastropod mollusc in the family Chilodontaidae.

== Description ==
The size of the shell varies between 8 mm and 10 mm.

== Distribution ==
This marine species occurs in the Sulu Sea off the Philippines.
