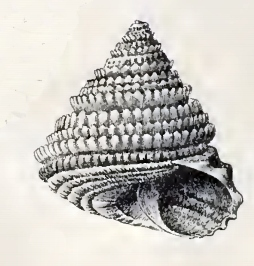
- Drawing with an apertural view of a shell of Dentistyla dentifera

Scientific classification
- Kingdom: Animalia
- Phylum: Mollusca
- Class: Gastropoda
- Subclass: Vetigastropoda
- Family: Chilodontaidae
- Genus: Dentistyla; Dall, 1889

= Dentistyla =

Genus of gastropods

Dentistyla is a genus of sea snails, marine gastropod molluscs in the family Chilodontaidae.

== Species ==
Species within the genus Dentistyla include:

- Dentistyla asperrima (Dall, 1881)
- Dentistyla dentifera (Dall, 1889)
- Dentistyla sericifilum (Dall, 1889)
