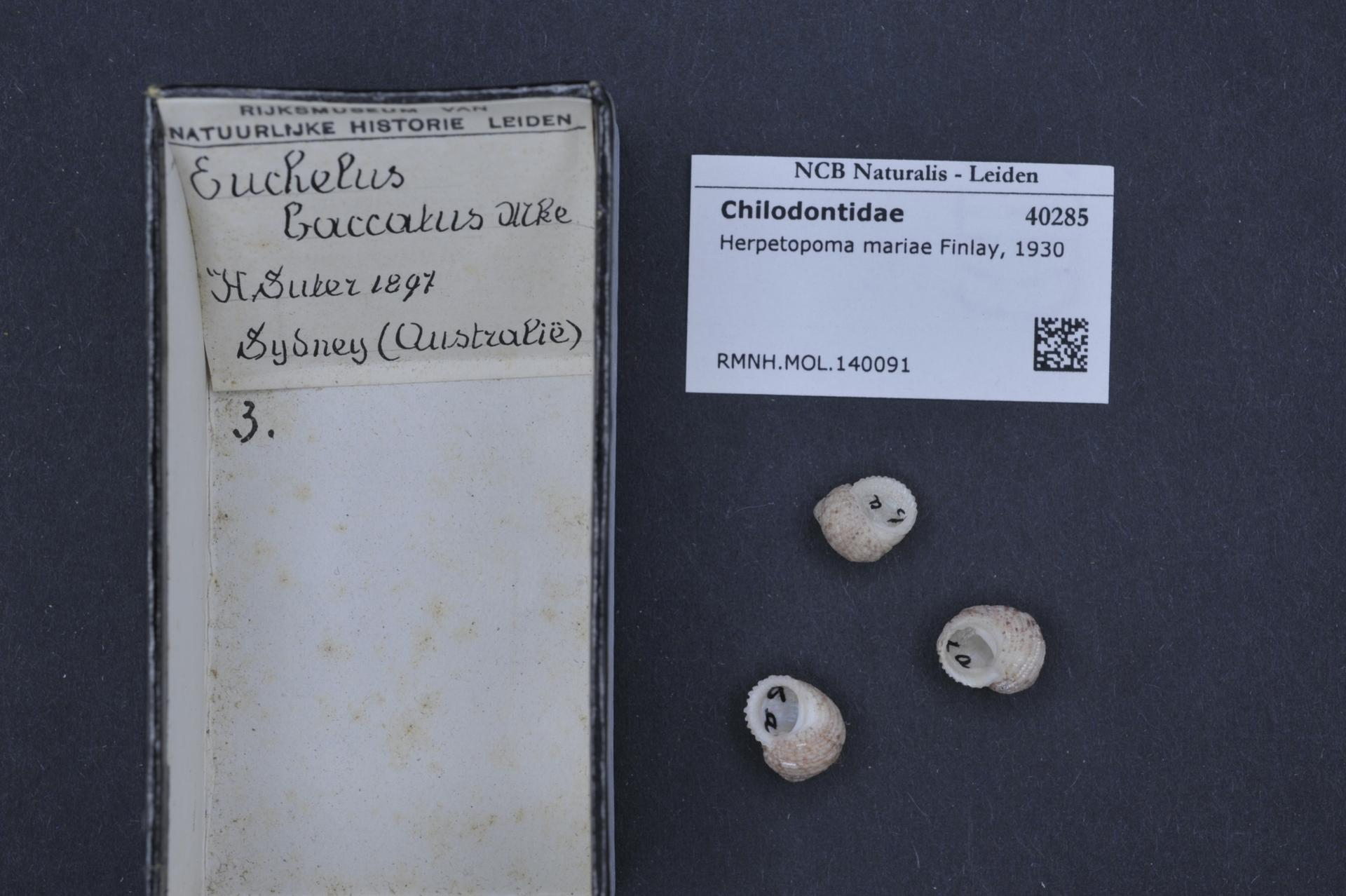

Scientific classification
- Kingdom: Animalia
- Phylum: Mollusca
- Class: Gastropoda
- Subclass: Vetigastropoda
- Family: Chilodontaidae
- Genus: Herpetopoma
- Species: H. mariae

Binomial name
- Herpetopoma mariae Finlay, 1930

Synonyms
- Euchelus baccatus (Menke)

= Herpetopoma mariae =

Species of gastropod

Herpetopoma mariae is a species of marine gastropod mollusc in the family Chilodontaidae.

== Distribution ==
New Zealand.

== Original description ==
Herpetopoma mariae was originally discovered and described by Harold John Finlay in 1930. Finlay's original text (the type description) reads as follows:

Herpetopoma mariae n. sp.

1913. Euchelus baccatus (Menke): Suter, Man. N.Z. Moll., p. 1984; not of Menke.

Shell closely related to H. aspersa (Phil.) (= baccata Menke, preoccupied). More depressed than typical Sydney examples, the earlier whorls notably more convex and globose. The suture is therefore better marked, but is not so deep; irregularity of the spiral ribs in aspersa produces a sub-canaliculation at the suture which is absent in mariae, the lowest rib on the penultimate whorl not prominent and overhanging as in the Australian species. Spiral ribbing far more regular, the ribs subequal in size (except on shoulder), without interstitial riblets, interstices subequal to or half width of ribs, narrower on base; 6 main ribs and some finer ones on shoulder on penultimate whorl, 14-16 on body whorl. Granulations on ribs notably finer than in aspersa, merely slight thickenings of growth lamellae, almost imperceptible to naked eye; tubercles are distinctly visible on aspersa. Outer lip thin and fragile instead of strongly thickened, columellar tubercle more of a spiral twist than a tooth.

Height, 10.5 mm.; width, 9.5 mm.

Locality—Cape Maria van Diemen, one specimen; this and previous species collected by the lighthouse keeper.

Type in Finlay collection.

This is undoubtedly the species Suter identified as Euchelus baccatus; a record that has already been rejected by me (Trans. N.Z. Inst., vol. 57, p. 362, 1926).
