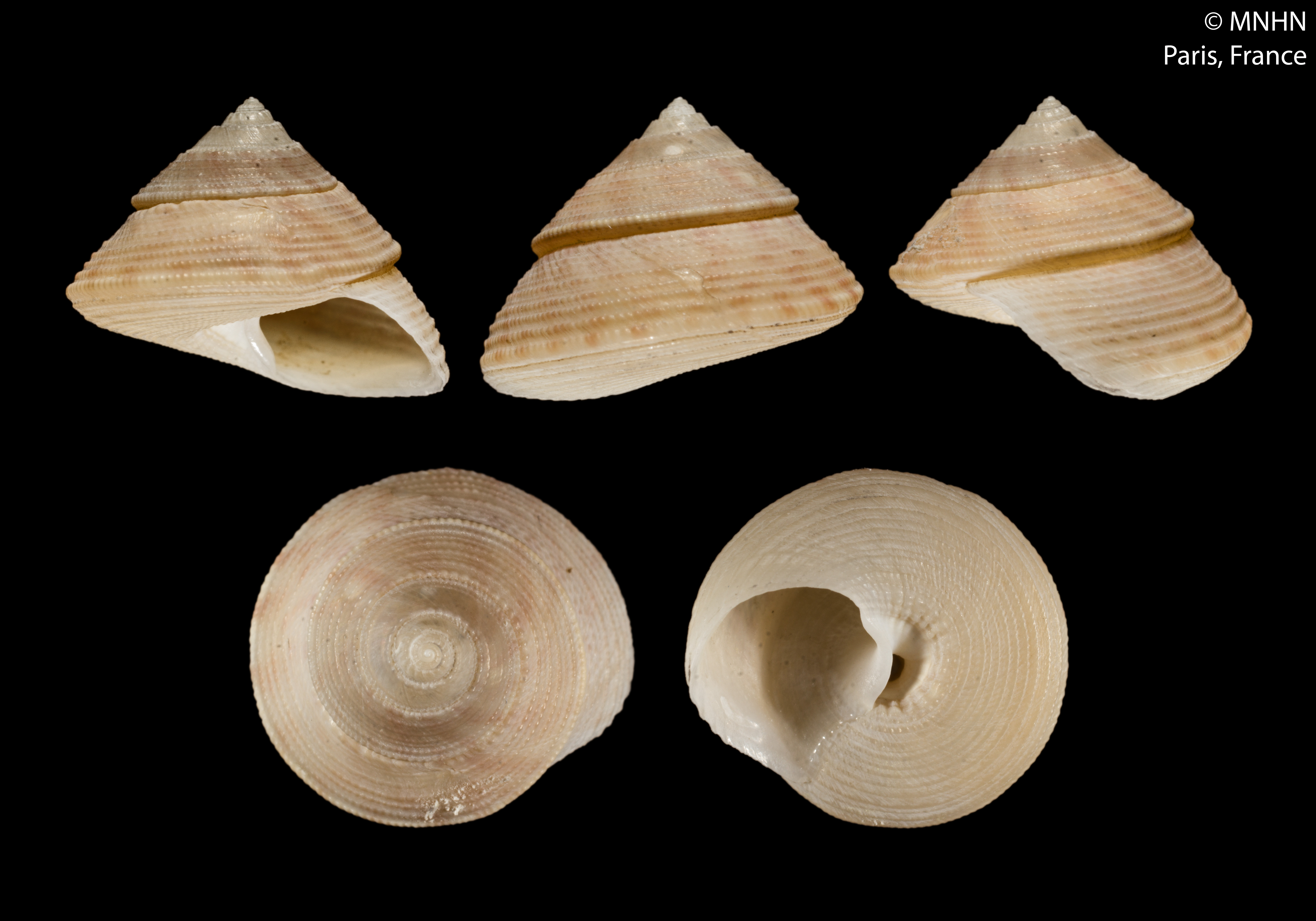
- Shell of Calliostoma mariae (holotype at MNHN, Paris)

Scientific classification
- Kingdom: Animalia
- Phylum: Mollusca
- Class: Gastropoda
- Subclass: Vetigastropoda
- Order: Trochida
- Family: Calliostomatidae
- Genus: Calliostoma
- Species: C. mariae

Binomial name
- Calliostoma mariae Poppe, Tagaro & Dekker, 2006

= Calliostoma mariae =

Species of gastropod

Calliostoma mariae is a species of small sea snail, a marine gastropod mollusc in the family Calliostomatidae.

== Distribution ==
This species is endemic to the Philippines. It is found in Northern Leyte in the Visayas group of islands. This top shell lives at depths of approximately 205 to 214 m.

== Shell description ==
The shell is broadly conical with six slightly convex whorls. It is small for the genus. The shell height is up to 8 mm, and the width is up to 10 mm.
