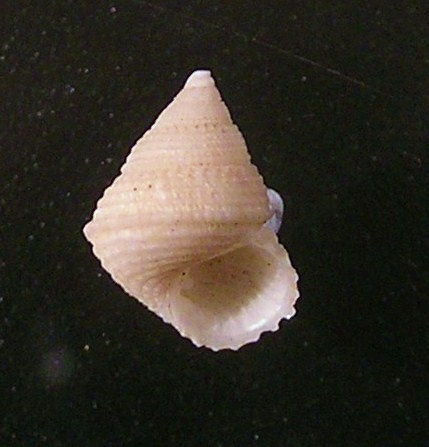
- Apertural view of a shell of Perrinia concinna

Scientific classification
- Kingdom: Animalia
- Phylum: Mollusca
- Class: Gastropoda
- Subclass: Vetigastropoda
- Superfamily: Seguenzioidea
- Family: Chilodontidae; Wenz, 1938

Synonyms
- Chilodontaidae Wenz, 1938 [proposed to address assumed homonymy] · unaccepted > nomen nudum

= Chilodontidae (gastropoda) =

Family of gastropods

Chilodontidae is a taxonomic family of mostly small deepwater sea snails, marine gastropod molluscs in the clade Vetigastropoda (according to the taxonomy of the Gastropoda by Bouchet & Rocroi, 2005).

== Taxonomy ==
The family was previously in the superfamily Neritoidea in the order Neritopsina and the superorder Neritaemorphi.

=== 2005 taxonomy ===
This family consists of three following subfamilies (according to the taxonomy of the Gastropoda by Bouchet & Rocroi, 2005):

- Chilodontainae Wenz, 1938
- Calliotropinae Hickman & McLean, 1990
- Cataeginae McLean & Quinn, 1987

=== 2007 taxonomy ===
A molecular phylogeny-based taxonomy of the Seguenzioidea was published by Kano (2007).

It was proposed to rename the family Chilodontidae Wenz, 1938 as "Chilodontaidae" because it was a homonym of the fish family "Chilodontidae" Eigenmann, 1912, but a 2024 ICZN ruling instead changed the name of the fish family to Chilodidae, so the gastropod family is still to be kept as Chilodontidae.

The subfamilies Calliotropinae Hickman & McLean, 1990 and Cataeginae McLean & Quinn, 1987 were raised to family levels as the Calliotropidae and the Cataegidae.

== Genera ==
Genera within the family Chilodontidae include (according to the World Register of Marine Species:

- † Agathodonta Cosman, 1918
- Ascetostoma Herbert, 2012
- † Calliovarica H. Vokes, 1939
- Chilodonta Etallon, 1862
- † Chilodontoidea Hudleston, 1896
- Clypeostoma Herbert, 2012
- Danilia Brusina, 1865
- † Daniliopsis Vera-Peláez, 2022
- Dentistyla Dall, 1889
- Euchelus Philippi, 1847
- Granata Cotton, 1957
- Herpetopoma Pilsbry, 1889
- Hybochelus Pilsbry, 1889
- Imbricoscelis D. G. Herbert, 2024
- Mirachelus Woodring, 1928
- † Odontoturbo Loriol, 1887
- † Onkospira Zittel, 1873
- Perrinia H. Adams & A. Adams, 1854
- Pholidotrope Herbert, 2012
- † Plagiochilus Kollmann, 2005
- † Polystenoma Kollmann, 2005
- Putzeysia Sulliotti, 1889
- Tallorbis G. Nevill & H. Nevill, 1869
- Vaceuchelus Iredale, 1929
- Vetulonia Dall, 1913
- Vinagranata Thach, 2025

=== Genera brought into synonymy ===
- Craspedotus Philippi, 1847: synonym of Danilia Brusina, 1865
- Heliciella O.G. Costa, 1861: synonym of Danilia Brusina, 1865
- Huttonia Kirk, 1882: synonym of Herpetopoma Pilsbry, 1890
- Nevillia H. Adams, 1868: synonym of Alcyna A. Adams, 1860
- Olivia Cantraine, 1835: synonym of Danilia Brusina, 1865
