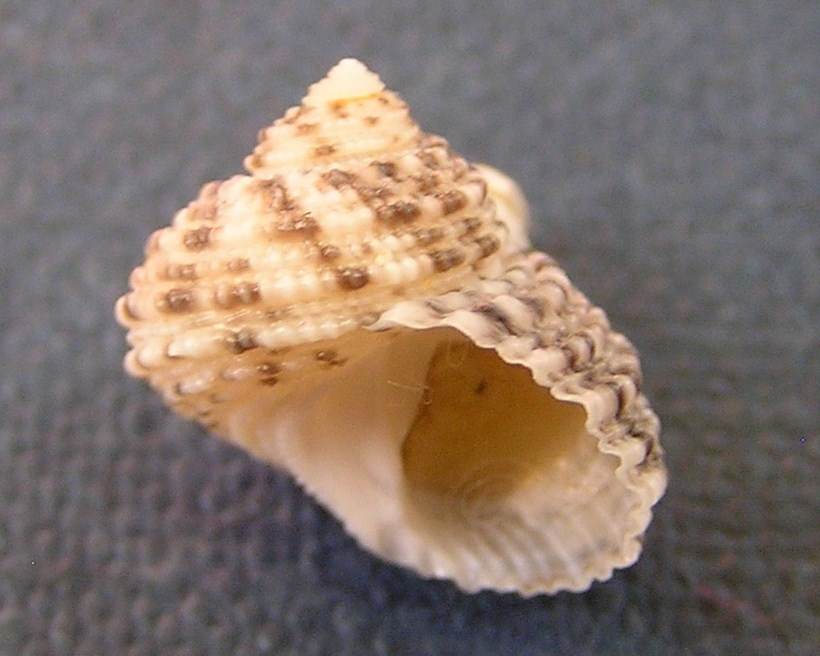
- Apertural view of a shell of Euchelus asper

Scientific classification
- Kingdom: Animalia
- Phylum: Mollusca
- Class: Gastropoda
- Subclass: Vetigastropoda
- Superfamily: Seguenzioidea
- Family: Chilodontaidae
- Genus: Euchelus; Philippi, 1847

Type species
- Trochus quadricarinatus Holten, 1802

Synonyms
- Trochus (Euchelus) Philippi, 1847

= Euchelus =

Genus of gastropods

Euchelus is a genus of sea snails, marine gastropod mollusks in the family Chilodontaidae (formerly in the family Trochidae).

== Description ==
The umbilicate or imperforate shell has a globose-turbinate shape. It is umbilicate or imperforate. The whorls are rounded and with spirally granose revolving ribs. The aperture is subcircular. The outer lip is thickened, and crenulate within. The columella shows a central tooth or a notch at the base. The operculum has few whorls that are rapidly increasing.

== Distribution ==
These marine species occur in the Indo-Pacific.

== Species ==
Species within the genus Euchelus include:

- Euchelus alarconi Rehder, 1980
- Euchelus asper (Gmelin, 1791)
- Euchelus atratus (Gmelin, 1791)
- Euchelus barbadensis Dall, 1927
- Euchelus bermudensis Moolenbeek & Faber, 1989
- Euchelus bitoi Nomura & Hatai, 1940
- Euchelus circulatus (Anton, 1849)
- Euchelus dampierensis Jansen, 1994
- Euchelus decora Poppe & Tagaro, 2016
- Euchelus eucastus Dall, 1927
- Euchelus guttarosea Dall, 1889
- Euchelus horridus (Philippi, 1846)
- Euchelus hummelincki Moolenbeek & Faber, 1989
- Euchelus mysticus Pilsbry, 1889
- Euchelus oxytropis (Philippi, 1848)
- Euchelus persicus (E. von Martens, 1874)
- Euchelus polysarkon Vilvens, 2017
- Euchelus pullatus Anton, 1848
- Euchelus scaber (Linnaeus, 1758)

Taxon inquirendum

- Euchelus maculosus Pease, 1863

Species brought into synonymy

- Euchelus (Herpetopoma) Pilsbry, 1890; synonym of Herpetopoma Pilsbry, 1890
- Euchelus (Nevillia) H. Adams, 1868; synonym of Nevillia H. Adams, 1868
- Euchelus alabastrum (Reeve, 1858); synonym of Euchelus asper (Gmelin, 1791)
- Euchelus alarconi Rehder, 1980: synonym of Herpetopoma alarconi (Rehder, 1980)
- Euchelus ampullus Tate, 1893; synonym of Vaceuchelus ampullus (Tate, 1893)
- Euchelus angulatus Pease, 1867; synonym of Vaceuchelus angulatus (Pease, 1867)
- Euchelus bellus Hutton, 1873; synonym of Herpetopoma bellum (Hutton, 1873)
- Euchelus bicinctus Philippi, 1849: synonym of Clanculus tonnerrei (G. Nevill & H. Nevill, 1874)
- Euchelus bourcierei Crosse, 1863: synonym of Herpetopoma instrictum (Gould, 1849)
- Euchelus bronni Dunker, 1860: synonym of Clanculus bronni Dunker, 1860
- Euchelus corrugatus Pease, 1861: synonym of Herpetopoma corrugatum (Pease, 1861)
- Euchelus erythraeensis Sturany, 1903; synonym of Clanculus tonnerrei (G. Nevill & H. Nevill, 1874)
- Euchelus favosus Melvill & Standen, 1896; synonym of Vaceuchelus clathratus (A. Adams, 1853)
- Euchelus fischeri (Montrouzier in Souverbie & Montrouzier, 1866): synonym of Monodonta fischeri Montrouzier [in Souverbie & Montrouzier], 1866; synonym of Herpetopoma fischeri (Montrouzier [in Souverbie & Montrouzier], 1866); synonym of Herpetopoma exasperatum (A. Adams, 1853)
- Euchelus gemmula Turton, 1932; synonym of Vaceuchelus gemmula (Turton, 1932)
- Euchelus gemmatus (Gould, 1845): synonym of Herpetopoma gemmatum (Gould, 1845)
- Euchelus hachijoensis Pilsbry, 1904: synonym of Herpetopoma rubrum (A. Adams, 1851)
- Euchelus lamberti (Souverbie in Souverbie & Montrouzier, 1875): synonym of Tallorbis roseola G. Nevill & H. Nevill, 1869
- Euchelus lischkei Pilsbry, 1904: synonym of Herpetopoma lischkei (Pilsbry, 1904)
- Euchelus midwayensis Habe & Kosuge, 1970: synonym of Danilia eucheliformis (Nomura & Hatai, 1940)
- Euchelus natalensis E. A. Smith, 1906; synonym of Vaceuchelus natalensis (E. A. Smith, 1906)
- Euchelus profundior May, 1915; synonym of Vaceuchelus profundior (May, 1915)
- Euchelus providentiae Melvill, 1909: synonym of Herpetopoma providentiae (Melvill, 1909)
- Euchelus quadricarinatus (Holten, 1802): synonym of Euchelus asper (Gmelin, 1791)
- Euchelus ringens Schepman, 1908; synonym of Herpetopoma ringens (Schepman, 1908)
- Euchelus ruber: synonym of Herpetopoma rubrum (A. Adams, 1853)
- Euchelus scabriusculus A. Adams & Angas, 1867; synonym of Herpetopoma scabriusculum (A. Adams & Angas, 1867)
- Euchelus scrobiculatus (Souverbie, 1886); synonym of Vaceuchelus scrobiculatus (Souverbie, 1866)
- Euchelus seychellarum G. Nevill & H. Nevill, 1869; synonym of Herpetopoma seychellarum (G. Nevill & H. Nevill, 1869)
- Euchelus smithi Dunker, R.W., 1882: synonym of Monilea smithi (Wood, 1828)
- Euchelus townsendianus Melvill & Standen, 1903; synonym of Clypeostoma townsendianum (Melvill & Standen, 1903)
- Euchelus xeniolum Melvill, 1918; synonym of Herpetopoma xeniolum (Melvill, 1918)
