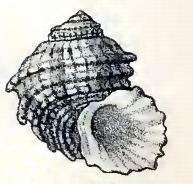
- Drawing of a shell of Vaceuchelus semilugubris

Scientific classification
- Kingdom: Animalia
- Phylum: Mollusca
- Class: Gastropoda
- Subclass: Vetigastropoda
- Family: Chilodontaidae
- Genus: Vaceuchelus; Iredale, 1929

Type species
- Euchelus angulatus Pease, 1867

= Vaceuchelus =

Genus of gastropods

Vaceuchelus is a genus of sea snails, marine gastropod molluscs in the family Chilodontaidae.

== Distribution ==
This genus occurs in the Indo Pacific, from the Red Sea to French Polynesia; also off Australia.

== Species ==
Species within the genus Vaceuchelus include:

- Vaceuchelus abdii Poppe, Tagaro & Dekker, 2006
- Vaceuchelus ampullus (Tate, 1893)
- Vaceuchelus auricatris Huang & Fu, 2015
- Vaceuchelus cavernoides Vilvens, 2017
- Vaceuchelus cavernosus (G.B. Sowerby III, 1905)
- Vaceuchelus clathratus (A. Adams, 1853)
- Vaceuchelus cretaceus Herbert, 2012
- Vaceuchelus delpretei (Caramagna, 1888)
- Vaceuchelus elegantissimus Poppe & Tagaro, 2026
- Vaceuchelus entienzai Poppe & Tagaro, 2016
- Vaceuchelus favosus (Melvill & Standen, 1896)
- Vaceuchelus foveolatus (A. Adams, 1853)
- Vaceuchelus gemmula (Turton, 1932)
- Vaceuchelus gotoi Poppe & Tagarao, 2020
- Vaceuchelus jayorum Herbert, 2012
- Vaceuchelus natalensis (E.A. Smith, 1906)
- Vaceuchelus pagoboorum Poppe, Tagaro & Dekker, 2006
- Vaceuchelus phaios Vilvens, 2017
- Vaceuchelus profundior (May, 1915)
- Vaceuchelus rapaensis(Vilvens, 2017)
- Vaceuchelus scrobiculatus (Souverbie, 1866)
- Vaceuchelus semilugubris (Deshayes, 1863)
- Vaceuchelus vallesi Poppe, Tagaro & Dekker, 2006
- Vaceuchelus vangoethemi Poppe, Tagaro & Dekker, 2006

Synonyms

- Vaceuchelus angulatus (Pease, 1867): synonym of Vaceuchelus foveolatus (A. Adams, 1853) (junior subjective synonym)
- Vaceuchelus ludiviniae Poppe, Tagaro & Dekker, 2006: synonym of Herpetopoma ludiviniae (Poppe, Tagaro & H. Dekker, 2006) (original combination)
- Vaceuchelus mysticus (Pilsbry, 1890): synonym of Euchelus mysticus Pilsbry, 1889
- Vaceuchelus roseolus (G. Nevill & H. Nevill, 1869): synonym of Tallorbis roseola G. Nevill & H. Nevill, 1869
- Vaceuchelus saguili Poppe, Tagaro & Dekker, 2006: synonym of Vaceuchelus favosus (Melvill & Standen, 1896)
