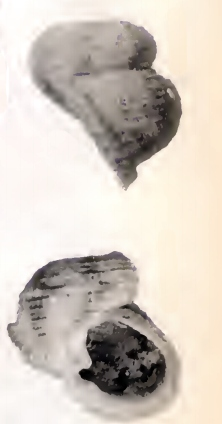
- Original image with two views of a shell of Danilia affinis

Scientific classification
- Kingdom: Animalia
- Phylum: Mollusca
- Class: Gastropoda
- Subclass: Vetigastropoda
- Family: Chilodontaidae
- Genus: Danilia
- Species: D. affinis

Binomial name
- Danilia affinis Dautzenberg & H. Fischer, 1896

= Danilia affinis =

Species of gastropod

Danilia affinis, is a species of sea snail, a marine gastropod mollusc in the family Chilodontaidae.

== Description ==
The height of the shell attains 10 mm. The rather thin, imperforated shell has a conical spire and rounded, inflated body whorl. The sculpture shows elevated spiral cords, slightly unequal in size and narrower than interspaces, crossed by minute and numerous prosocline lamellae which override the cords. The peristome is flaring in adult shells, with a distinct outer varix and with internal denticles elongated in the spiral direction. The columella has a strong denticle. The colour of the shell is whitish with the inner nacre showing through, with vague brownish flames on specimens from shallower sites. The inside of the round aperture is nacreous.

This species is distinguished from Danilia tinei in having the axial lamellae minute and about three times more numerous, the whitish colour and the more inflated and more fragile shell, with more convex whorls.

== Distribution ==
This species occurs in the Atlantic Ocean off the Azores and on Atlantic seamounts at depths between 300 m and 730 m.
