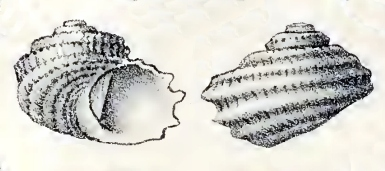
- Drawing with two views of a shell of Vaceuchelus delpretei

Scientific classification
- Kingdom: Animalia
- Phylum: Mollusca
- Class: Gastropoda
- Subclass: Vetigastropoda
- Family: Chilodontaidae
- Genus: Vaceuchelus
- Species: V. delpretei

Binomial name
- Vaceuchelus delpretei (Caramagna, 1888)

Synonyms
- Euchelus delpretei Caramagna, 1888; Trochus delpretei Caramagna, 1888

= Vaceuchelus delpretei =

Species of gastropod

Vaceuchelus delpretei is a species of sea snail, a marine gastropod mollusc in the family Chilodontaidae.

== Description ==
The shell grows to a height of 4 mm. The umbilicate, rather thick, whitish, subvitreous shell has a conic-depressed shape. The apex is obtuse. The first 3 whorls are planate above. They are elegantly ornamented with elevated spiral ribs and longitudinal striae. The first whorl is nearly smooth. The body whorl is double as long as the spire It is tumid, dilated and ornamented with 3 elevated cinguli on the lower part, 2 less elevated ones above. The base of the shell has 6 granulose, minutely striated, concentric cinguli. The thin outer lip is denticulated by the external sulci. The columella is smooth, straight, excavated at its base, and scarcely forming a denticle The white aperture is oblique and sulcate within.

== Distribution ==
This species occurs in the Red Sea.
