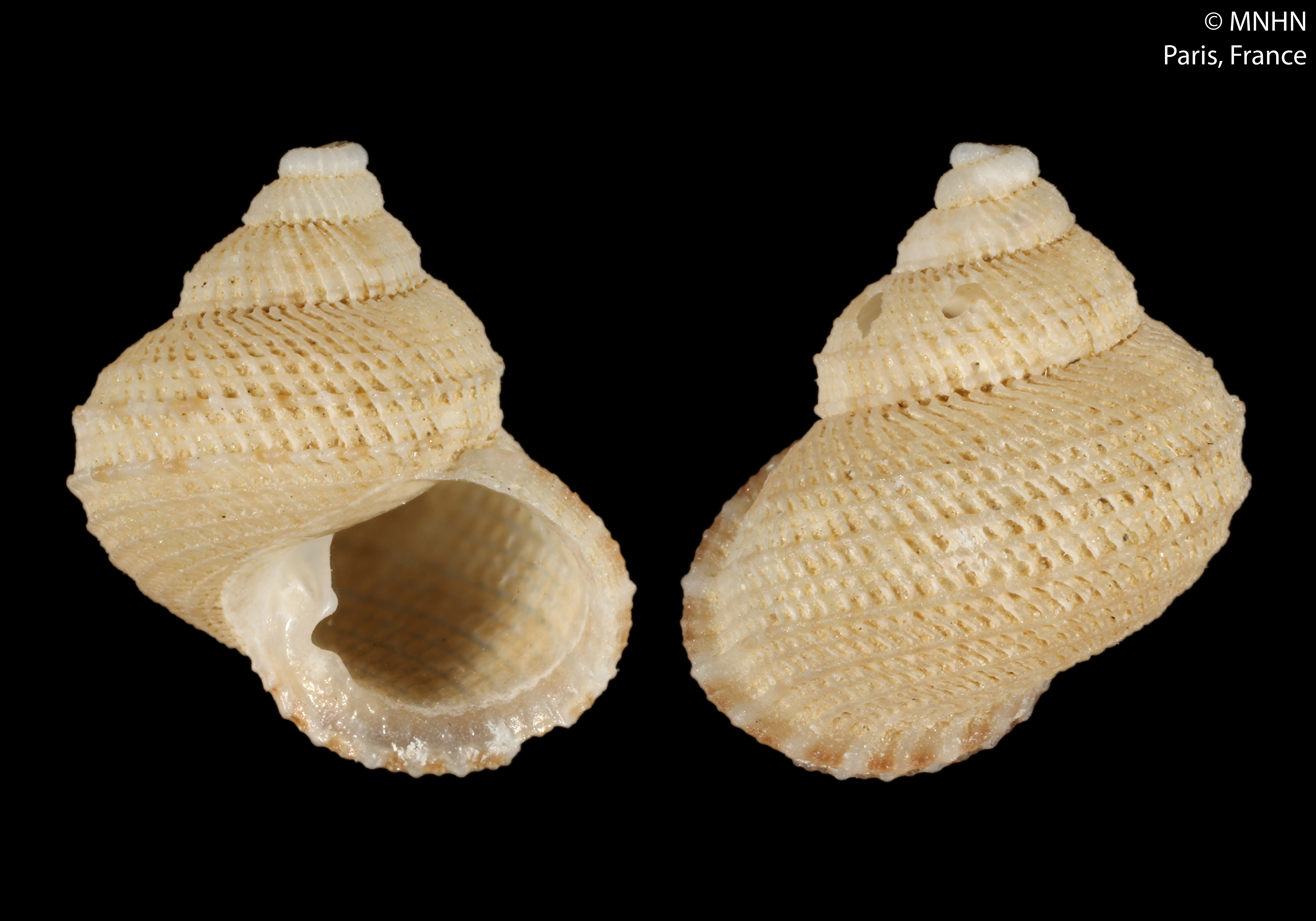
- Danilia boucheti

Scientific classification
- Kingdom: Animalia
- Phylum: Mollusca
- Class: Gastropoda
- Subclass: Vetigastropoda
- Family: Chilodontaidae
- Genus: Danilia; Brusina, 1865

Type species
- Monodonta limbata Philippi, 1844

Species
- See text

Synonyms
- Craspedotus Philippi, 1847 (invalid: junior homonym of Craspedotus Schoenherr, 1844 [Coleoptera]); Heliciella O.G. Costa, 1861 (invalid: declared nomen oblitum by Herbert (2012)); Olivia Cantraine, 1835 (invalid: junior homonym of Olivia Bertolini, 1810 [?Porifera]); Otavia Gray, 1847 (non Risso, 1826)

= Danilia =

Genus of gastropods

Danilia is a genus of sea snails, marine gastropod molluscs of the family Chilodontaidae.

Previously it was considered a subgenus of Euchelus Philippi, 1847. This genus was named after the malacologist Francesco Danilo (1813- ?)

== Species ==
Species within the genus Danilia include:

- Danilia affinis Dautzenberg & H. Fischer, 1896
- Danilia angulosa Vilvens & Heros, 2005
- Danilia boucheti Herbert, 2012
- Danilia discordata Vilvens & Heros, 2005
- Danilia eucheliformis (Nomura & Hatai, 1940)
- Danilia galeata Vilvens & Heros, 2005
- Danilia insperata Beu & Climo, 1974
- Danilia kuroshio Okutani, 1968
- † Danilia otaviana (Cantraine, 1835)
- Danilia stratmanni Poppe, Tagaro & Dekker, 2006
- Danilia telebathia Hedley, 1911
- Danilia textilis Herbert, 2012
- Danilia tinei (Calcara, 1839)
- Danilia weberi Schepman, 1908

Species brought into synonymy

- Danilia costellata (Costa, 1861): synonym of Danilia tinei (Calcara, 1839)
