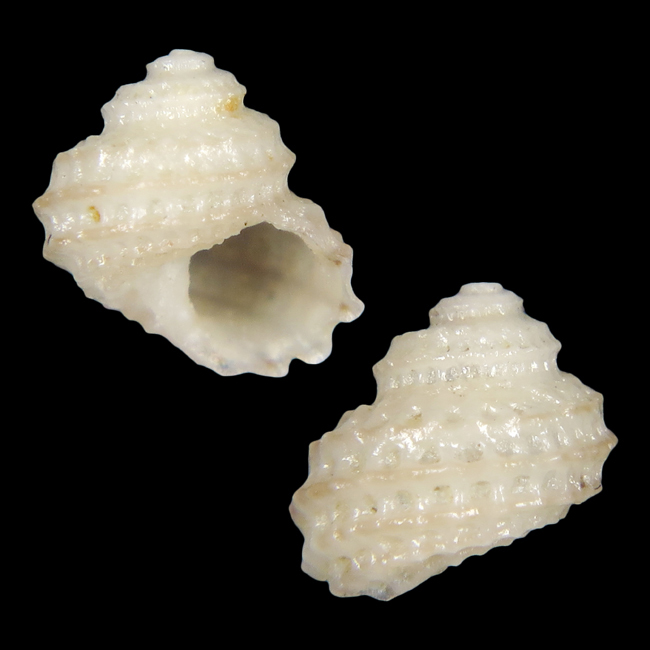

Scientific classification
- Kingdom: Animalia
- Phylum: Mollusca
- Class: Gastropoda
- Subclass: Vetigastropoda
- Family: Chilodontaidae
- Genus: Vaceuchelus
- Species: V. vangoethemi

Binomial name
- Vaceuchelus vangoethemi Poppe, Tagaro & Dekker, 2006

= Vaceuchelus vangoethemi =

Species of gastropod

Vaceuchelus vangoethemi is a species of sea snail, a marine gastropod mollusc in the family Chilodontaidae.

== Description ==
The length of the shell attains 7.6 mm. The shell is a pearly white with a very predominant luster, with occasional tan dots littered throughout the surface. The species is characterized by an elevated spire and sculpture surface, including granule spiral cords and axial ribs that form beaded intersections, with the base bearing four to five granular cords and a narrow umbilicus often restricted to a silt.

== Distribution ==
This marine species occurs off the Philippines.

== Original description ==
- Poppe G.T., Tagaro S.P. & Dekker H. (2006) The Seguenziidae, Chilodontidae, Trochidae, Calliostomatidae and Solariellidae of the Philippine Islands. Visaya Supplement 2: 1–228.
