= Euchelus hummelincki =

Scientific classification
- Kingdom: Animalia
- Phylum: Mollusca
- Class: Gastropoda
- Subclass: Vetigastropoda
- Family: Chilodontaidae
- Genus: Euchelus
- Species: E. hummelincki

Binomial name
- Euchelus hummelincki Moolenbeek & Faber, 1989

Species of gastropod

Euchelus hummelincki is a species of sea snail, a marine gastropod mollusc in the family Chilodontaidae.

== Description ==
The height of the shell attains 3.2 mm.

== Distribution ==
This marine species occurs in the West Indies off the Grenadines and Barbados; in the Atlantic Ocean off Brazil.
