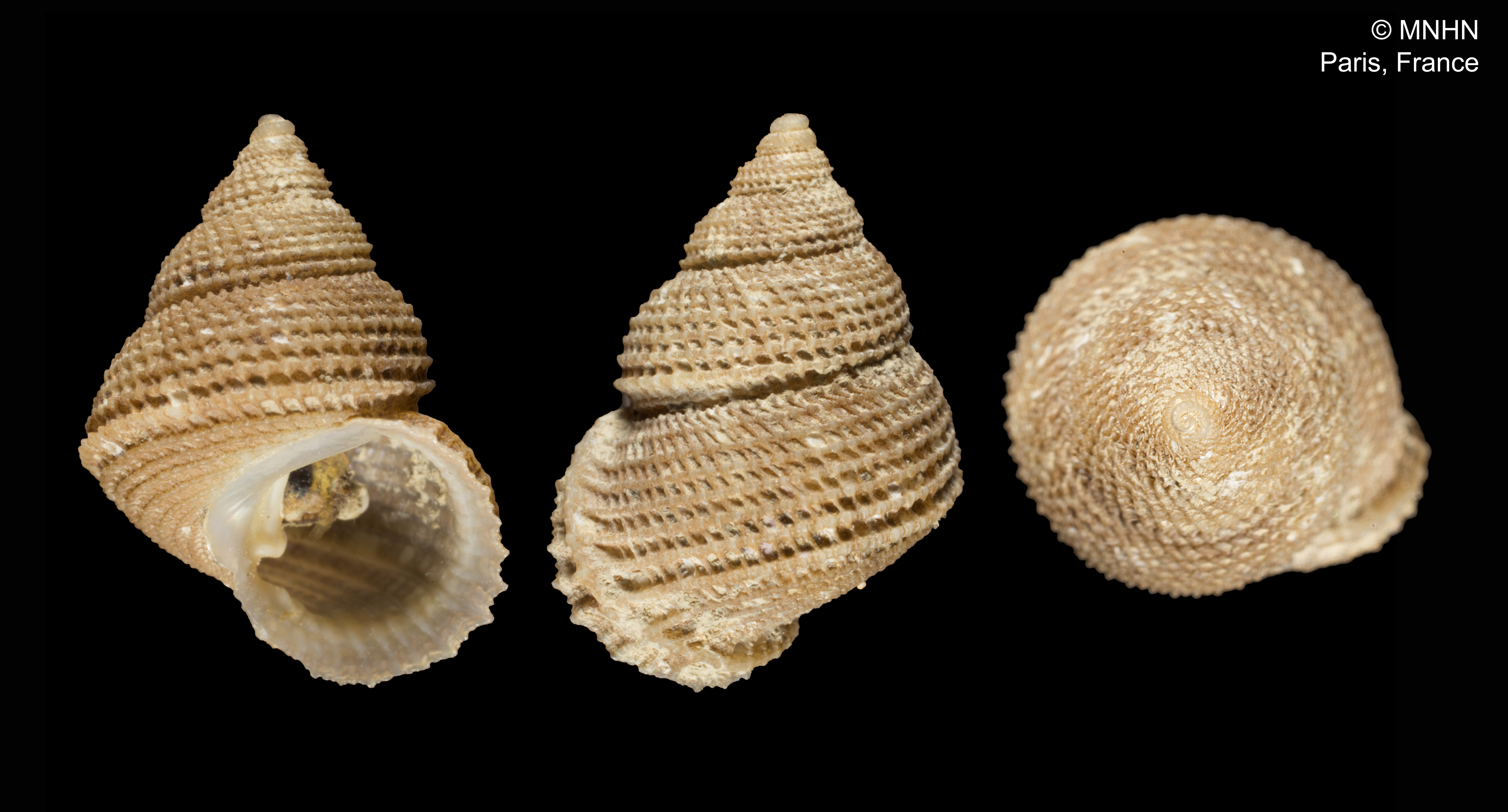

Scientific classification
- Kingdom: Animalia
- Phylum: Mollusca
- Class: Gastropoda
- Subclass: Vetigastropoda
- Family: Chilodontaidae
- Genus: Danilia
- Species: D. galeata

Binomial name
- Danilia galeata Vilvens & Heros, 2005

= Danilia galeata =

Species of gastropod

Danilia galeata is a species of sea snail, a marine gastropod mollusk in the family Chilodontaidae.

== Distribution ==
This species occurs in the Western Pacific.
