= Euchelus barbadensis =

Scientific classification
- Kingdom: Animalia
- Phylum: Mollusca
- Class: Gastropoda
- Subclass: Vetigastropoda
- Family: Chilodontaidae
- Genus: Euchelus
- Species: E. barbadensis

Binomial name
- Euchelus barbadensis Dall, 1927

Species of gastropod

Euchelus barbadensis is a species of sea snail, a marine gastropod mollusc in the family Chilodontaidae.

== Description ==
The height of the shell attains 9 mm.

== Distribution ==
This species occurs at the Lesser Antilles off Barbados.
