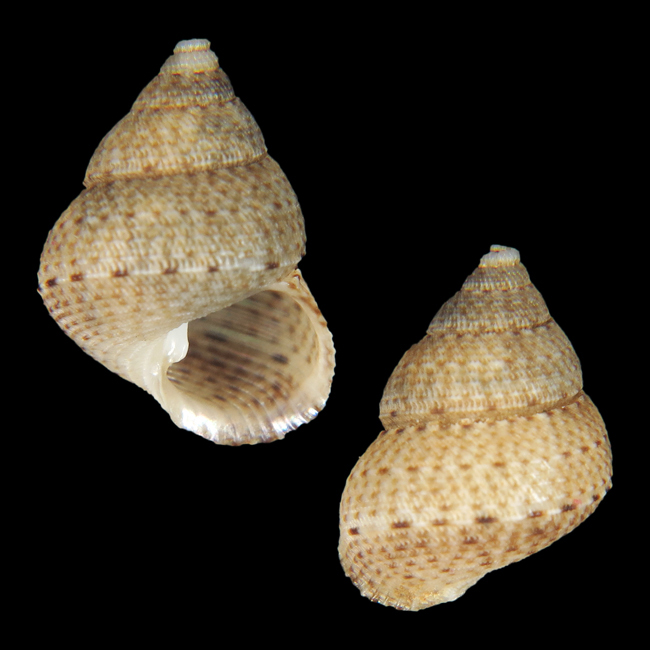
- Shell of Danilia stratmanni

Scientific classification
- Kingdom: Animalia
- Phylum: Mollusca
- Class: Gastropoda
- Subclass: Vetigastropoda
- Family: Chilodontaidae
- Genus: Danilia
- Species: D. stratmanni

Binomial name
- Danilia stratmanni Poppe, Tagaro & Dekker, 2006

= Danilia stratmanni =

Species of gastropod

Danilia stratmanni is a species of sea snail, a marine gastropod mollusc in the family Chilodontaidae.

== Description ==
The size of the shell varies between 8 mm and 13 mm.

== Distribution ==
This marine species occurs off the Philippines.
