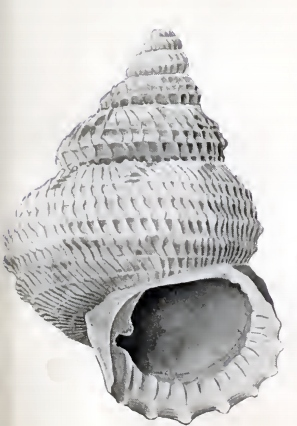
- Original drawing, an apertural view of the shell of Danilia telebathia

Scientific classification
- Kingdom: Animalia
- Phylum: Mollusca
- Class: Gastropoda
- Subclass: Vetigastropoda
- Family: Chilodontaidae
- Genus: Danilia
- Species: D. telebathia

Binomial name
- Danilia telebathia Hedley, 1911

= Danilia telebathia =

Species of gastropod

Danilia telebathia is a species of small sea snail, a marine gastropod mollusc in the family Chilodontaidae.

== Description ==
The height of the shell attains 11 mm. The thin and slightly nacreous, imperforate shell has an ovate shape. The shell contains seven whorls, the first wound horizontally, thus giving the spire a decapitated aspect. The median whorls are separated by a channeled suture, flattened on the shoulder and subangled at the periphery, the last slightly descending behind the aperture.

Colour : Pale yellowish beige with scattered irregular dashes of ochre alternate chocolate dots on the outer lip.

Sculpture : The body whorl carries eleven widely spaced fine spiral cords, the peripheral strongest. Of these six appear on the penultimate and fade gradually away on the upper whorls. Both cords and interspaces are crossed by delicate oblique lamellae which rise into scales upon the cords. They are crowded on the last whorl, do not cross the suture from whorl to whorl, and become fewer and fainter ascending the spire. The initial whorl is smooth. The aperture is very oblique and subcircular. The outer lip is effuse, fimbriated by the termination of the spiral sculpture. The inner lip projects over the umbilical region, thence spread from the axis to the right insertion as a solid sheet. The columella is spirally ascending within, terminating below in a downwardly directed tubercle, succeeded by a deep notch and an answering ridge. Thence along the edge of the gullet underneath the external varix are about a score of callus rays, alternately long and short, leading to the throat. Behind the aperture, about a millimetre from the free edge, is a sharp, narrow varix rising gradually at the base and ending abruptly at the suture.

== Distribution ==
This marine species occurs off South Australia in deep water.
