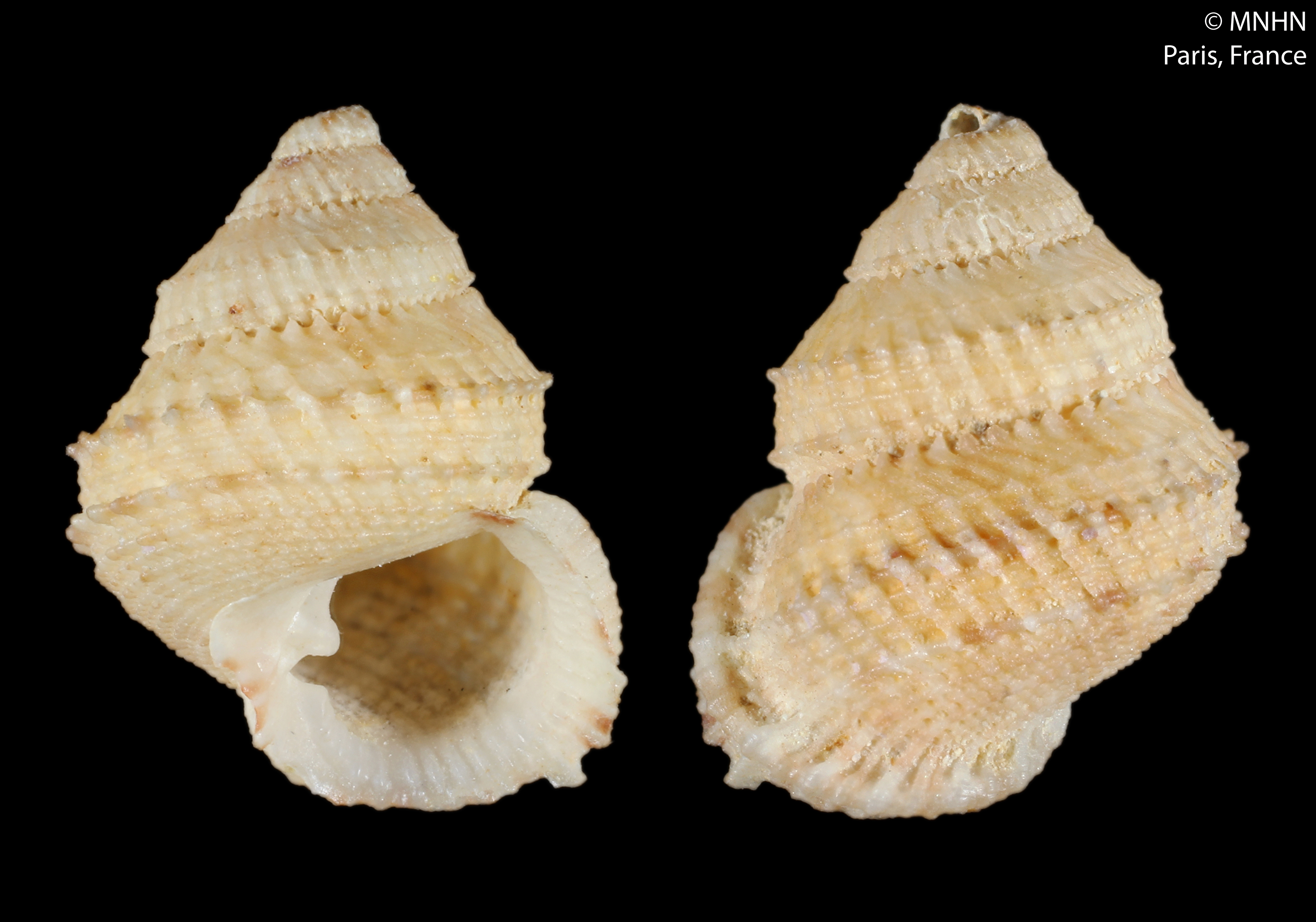

Scientific classification
- Kingdom: Animalia
- Phylum: Mollusca
- Class: Gastropoda
- Subclass: Vetigastropoda
- Family: Chilodontaidae
- Genus: Danilia
- Species: D. angulosa

Binomial name
- Danilia angulosa Vilvens & Heros, 2005

= Danilia angulosa =

Species of gastropod

Danilia angulosa is a species of sea snail, a marine gastropod mollusc in the family Chilodontaidae.

== Description ==
The size of the shell varies between 7 mm and 9 mm.

== Distribution ==
This marine species occurs off the Philippines, New Caledonia, the Loyalty Islands, Fiji, and Tonga.
