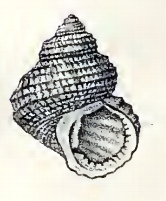
- Drawing with an apertural view of the shell of Danilia tinei

Scientific classification
- Kingdom: Animalia
- Phylum: Mollusca
- Class: Gastropoda
- Subclass: Vetigastropoda
- Family: Chilodontaidae
- Genus: Danilia
- Species: D. tinei

Binomial name
- Danilia tinei (Calcara, 1839)

Synonyms
- Craspedotus otavianus H. & A. Adams; Craspedotus limbatus Philippi, 1862; Danilia costellata (Costa, 1861); Danilia limbata Philippi, 1865; Danilia tinei Monterosato, 1844; Heliciella costellata Costa, 1861; Monodonta limbata Philippi, 1844; Monodonta tinei Calcara, 1839; Trochus bilabiatus Philippi, 1846; Trochus horridus Costa, 1861; Trochus limbatus Philippi, 1844; Trochus tineis Forbes, 1843

= Danilia tinei =

Species of gastropod

Danilia tinei is a species of sea snail, a marine gastropod mollusk in the family Chilodontaidae.

== Taxonomy ==
Monterosato (1914) figured the holotype from Calcara's collection and distinguished as separate species the fossil Danilia otaviana (Cantraine, 1835) and the two Recent Danilia tinei and Danilia horrida (Costa, 1861) = costellata (Costa, 1861), followed in this by Palazzi & Villari (2001). The fossil species is quite convincingly distinguished by a globose shape and much finer sculpture in which the spiral elements clearly dominate. The holotype of D. tinei is also globose but has a coarse sculpture with nodose cords, whereas the common form (including that on photographs herein) should go to Danilia costellata if two species are really to be separated. This is a topic that requires further research.

== Description ==
The size of the shell varies between 7 mm and 10 mm. The imperforate, solid, light brown shell has a conoidal shape with a rounded body whorl and base. Its elevated spire contains 6–7 convex whorls, separated by deep sutures. The first whorl is planorboid and smooth. The next one is lightly rib-striate. The remainder whorls are clathrate, encircled bv strong spiral lirae, crossed by elevated, lamellar, regular, vertical striae. There are 3 or 4 spirals on the penultimate whorl, 9 on the body whorl. The body whorl is rounded, with a strong, prominent varix behind the outer lip. The aperture is rounded, thickened within and a little expanded, a trifle iridescent. The columella is short, vertical with a fold above at the insertion and a strong fold-like tooth below, separated from the plicate basal lip by a deep, narrow, notch.

== Distribution ==
This species occurs in the Mediterranean Sea; in the Atlantic Ocean off the Faroes; Western Norway and Western Ireland
