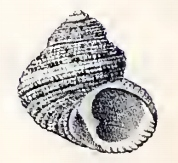
- Drawing with an apertural view of a shell of Euchelus pullatus

Scientific classification
- Kingdom: Animalia
- Phylum: Mollusca
- Class: Gastropoda
- Subclass: Vetigastropoda
- Family: Chilodontaidae
- Genus: Euchelus
- Species: E. pullatus

Binomial name
- Euchelus pullatus (Anton, 1848)

Synonyms
- Trochus pullatus Anton, 1848

= Euchelus pullatus =

Species of gastropod

Euchelus pullatus is a species of sea snail, a marine gastropod mollusk in the family Chilodontaidae.

== Description ==
The height of the shell attains 19 mm. The solid, thick shell has a globose-conic shape. it is imperforate when adult, umbilicate in the young,. Its color is whitish or yellowish, marked longitudinally with narrow black stripes, or series of black spots on the spirals. The 5½ convex whorls are encircled by numerous spiral lirae. They are clathrate with regular, elevated lamellae of growth, especially prominent between the lirae. The spiral lirae number 9 or 10 on the penultimate whorl, every alternate one slightly larger. On the body whorl there are about 16 to 18 lirae. The suture is very narrowly canaliculate. The aperture is about half the length of shell, rounded, silvery inside, and sulcate. The outer lip is thick and crenulated. The columella is slightly curved, with a slight tooth at its base.

== Distribution ==
This species occurs in the Red Sea and the Persian Gulf.
