= Vaceuchelus rapaensis =

Scientific classification
- Kingdom: Animalia
- Phylum: Mollusca
- Class: Gastropoda
- Subclass: Vetigastropoda
- Family: Chilodontaidae
- Genus: Vaceuchelus
- Species: V. rapaensis

Binomial name
- Vaceuchelus rapaensis Vilvens, 2017

Species of gastropod

Vaceuchelus rapaensis is a species of sea snail, a marine gastropod mollusc in the family Chilodontaidae.

== Distribution ==
This marine species occurs off the Austral Islands.
