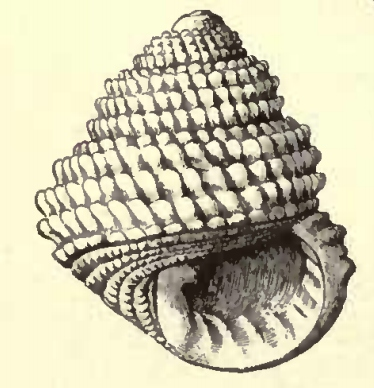
- Original drawing with an apertural view of a shell of Euchelus guttarosea

Scientific classification
- Kingdom: Animalia
- Phylum: Mollusca
- Class: Gastropoda
- Subclass: Vetigastropoda
- Family: Chilodontaidae
- Genus: Euchelus
- Species: E. guttarosea

Binomial name
- Euchelus guttarosea Dall, 1889

= Euchelus guttarosea =

Species of gastropod

Euchelus guttarosea is a species of sea snail, a marine gastropod mollusc in the family Chilodontaidae.

== Description ==
The height of the small shell attains 6 mm. Its color is all white. Or the upper surface of the whorls show very small distinct rose-red dots sparsely distributed over the white ground color on the raised nodules of the sculpture. The spire contains five or more inflated strongly sculptured whorls, and a smooth nucleus. The spiral sculpture of, on the upper surface of the last whorl, two small and two strong spiral alternated ribs, one of the smaller just below the suture; a large spiral on the periphery and four on the base. These are crossed by numerous obliquely radiating threads, which make the early whorls coarsely reticulate with nodules at the intersections, while in the later whorls the radiations become less marked and the spirals more numerous and more conspicuously nodulous. The whorls are rounded, while the apex is a little blunt. The suture is distinct, not channelled. The base of the shell is rounded. The shell lacks an umbilicus. The columella is nearly straight, with a strong tooth near its base. The rounded aperture is oblique, a little descending above, with six or eight stout lirae ending in tooth-like nodules. The body shows a moderate layer of nacreous callus.

== Distribution ==
This species is found in the Gulf of Mexico; the Caribbean Sea; off the Florida Strait; the Lesser Antilles, and off the Mid-Atlantic Ridge.
