= Vaceuchelus phaios =

Scientific classification
- Kingdom: Animalia
- Phylum: Mollusca
- Class: Gastropoda
- Subclass: Vetigastropoda
- Family: Chilodontaidae
- Genus: Vaceuchelus
- Species: V. phaios

Binomial name
- Vaceuchelus phaios Vilvens, 2017

Species of gastropod

Vaceuchelus phaios is a species of sea snail, a marine gastropod mollusc in the family Chilodontaidae.

== Distribution ==
This marine species occurs off the New Caledonia.
