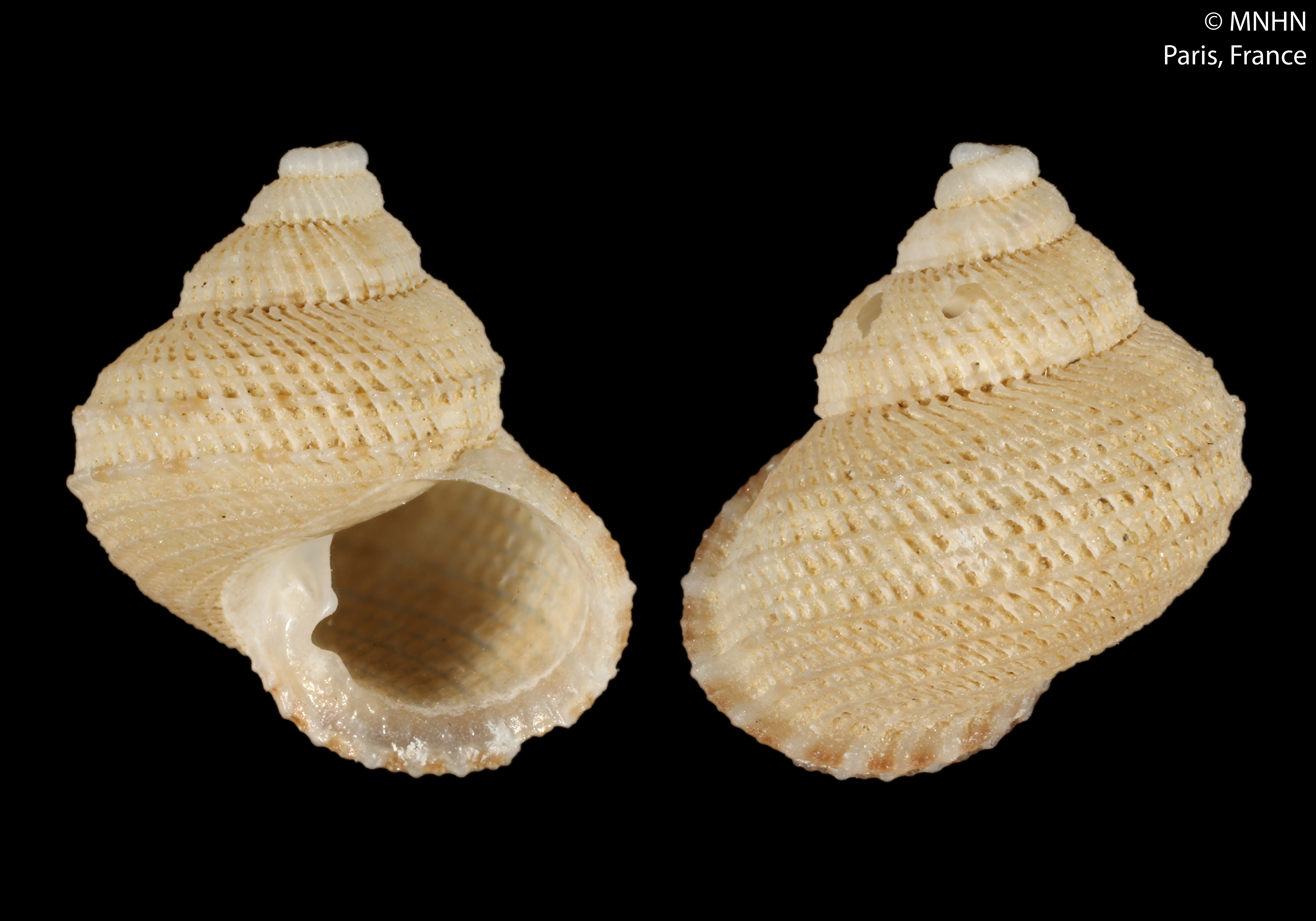

Scientific classification
- Kingdom: Animalia
- Phylum: Mollusca
- Class: Gastropoda
- Subclass: Vetigastropoda
- Family: Chilodontaidae
- Genus: Danilia
- Species: D. boucheti

Binomial name
- Danilia boucheti Herbert, 2012

= Danilia boucheti =

Species of gastropod

Danilia boucheti is a species of tiny sea snail, a marine gastropod mollusc in the family Chilodontaidae.

== Description ==
The size of the shell varies between 4 mm and 6 mm.

== Distribution ==
This species occurs in the southwest Indian Ocean, particularly within the Madagascan Exclusive Economic Zone.
