= Euchelus bermudensis =

Scientific classification
- Kingdom: Animalia
- Phylum: Mollusca
- Class: Gastropoda
- Subclass: Vetigastropoda
- Family: Chilodontaidae
- Genus: Euchelus
- Species: E. bermudensis

Binomial name
- Euchelus bermudensis Moolenbeek & Faber, 1989

Species of gastropod

Euchelus bermudensis is a species of sea snail, a marine gastropod mollusc in the family Chilodontaidae.

== Description ==
The height of the shell attains 3.3 mm.

== Distribution ==
This species occurs in the Atlantic Ocean off Bermuda.
