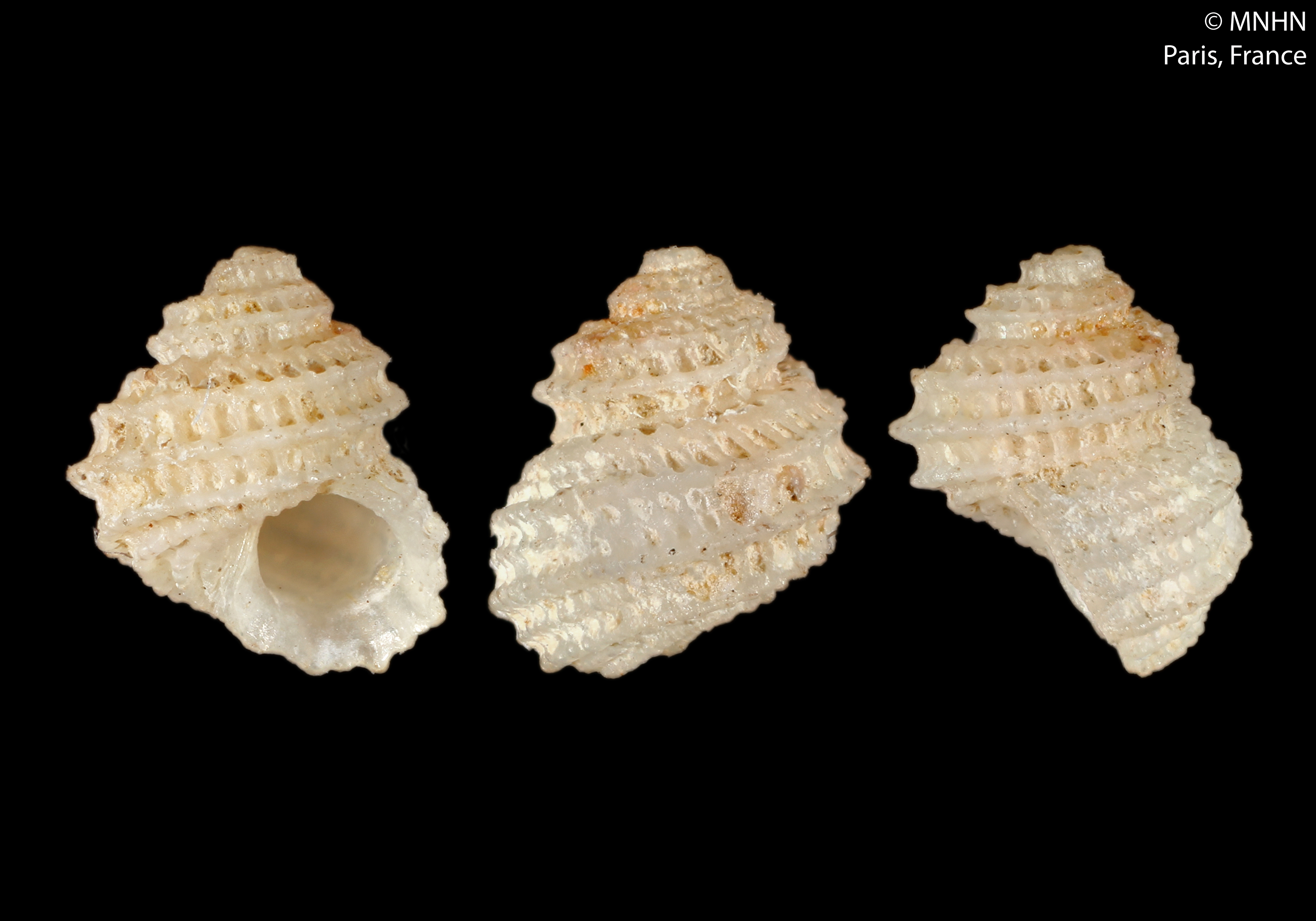

Scientific classification
- Kingdom: Animalia
- Phylum: Mollusca
- Class: Gastropoda
- Subclass: Vetigastropoda
- Family: Chilodontaidae
- Genus: Vaceuchelus
- Species: V. jayorum

Binomial name
- Vaceuchelus jayorum Herbert, 2012

= Vaceuchelus jayorum =

Species of gastropod

Vaceuchelus jayorum is a species of sea snail, a marine gastropod mollusc in the family Chilodontaidae.

== Description ==
The height of the shell attains 3 mm.

== Distribution ==
This species occurs in the Indian Ocean off Réunion, living on rocky substrate near shore.
