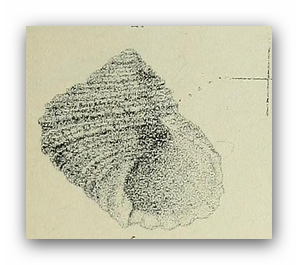
- Tallorbis roseola

Scientific classification
- Kingdom: Animalia
- Phylum: Mollusca
- Class: Gastropoda
- Subclass: Vetigastropoda
- Superfamily: Seguenzioidea
- Family: Chilodontaidae
- Genus: Tallorbis; G. Nevill & H. Nevill, 1869

= Tallorbis =

Genus of gastropods

Tallorbis is a genus of sea snails, marine gastropod mollusks in the family Chilodontaidae.

== Description ==
The shell is suborbiculate and subconic. The solid columella is anteriorly applanate, transversely plicate and abruptly terminated.

== Species ==
The only species within the genus Tallorbis is:

- Tallorbis roseola G. Nevill & H. Nevill, 1869
