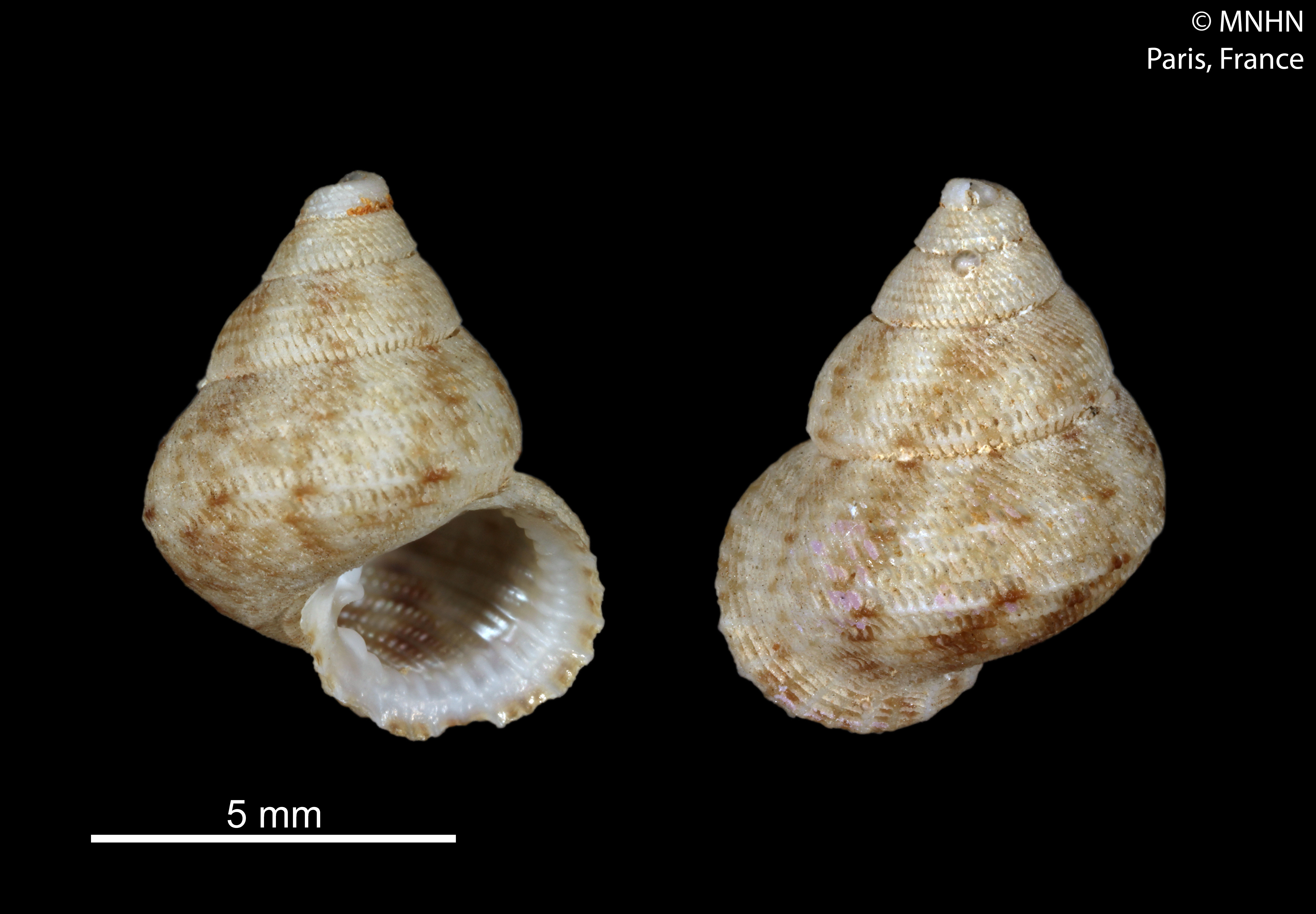

Scientific classification
- Kingdom: Animalia
- Phylum: Mollusca
- Class: Gastropoda
- Subclass: Vetigastropoda
- Family: Chilodontaidae
- Genus: Danilia
- Species: D. kuroshio

Binomial name
- Danilia kuroshio Okutani, 1968

= Danilia kuroshio =

Species of sea snail

Danilia kuroshio is a species of sea snail, a marine gastropod mollusk in the family Chilodontaidae.

== Description ==
The size of the shell varies between 7 and 13 mm (0.28 and 0.51 in).

== Distribution ==
This marine species occurs off the Philippines.
