= Vaceuchelus gotoi =

Scientific classification
- Kingdom: Animalia
- Phylum: Mollusca
- Class: Gastropoda
- Subclass: Vetigastropoda
- Family: Chilodontaidae
- Genus: Vaceuchelus
- Species: V. gotoi

Binomial name
- Vaceuchelus gotoi Poppe, Tagaro & Dekker, 2020

Species of gastropod

Vaceuchelus gotoi is a species of sea snail, a marine gastropod mollusk in the family Chilodontaidae.

== Distribution ==
This marine species occurs off Okinawa.

== Original description ==
- Poppe, G.T. & Tagaro, S.P. (2020). Description of two new trochoidean species from the Okinawa Islands. Visaya. 5 (4): 25-31.
