= Danilia textilis =

Scientific classification
- Kingdom: Animalia
- Phylum: Mollusca
- Class: Gastropoda
- Subclass: Vetigastropoda
- Family: Chilodontaidae
- Genus: Danilia
- Species: D. textilis

Binomial name
- Danilia textilis Herbert, 2012

Species of gastropod

Danilia textilis is a species of sea snail, a marine gastropod mollusc in the family Chilodontaidae.

== Description ==
The height of the shell attains 11 mm.

== Distribution ==
This marine species occurs from the Eastern Cape, South Africa to Mozambique.
