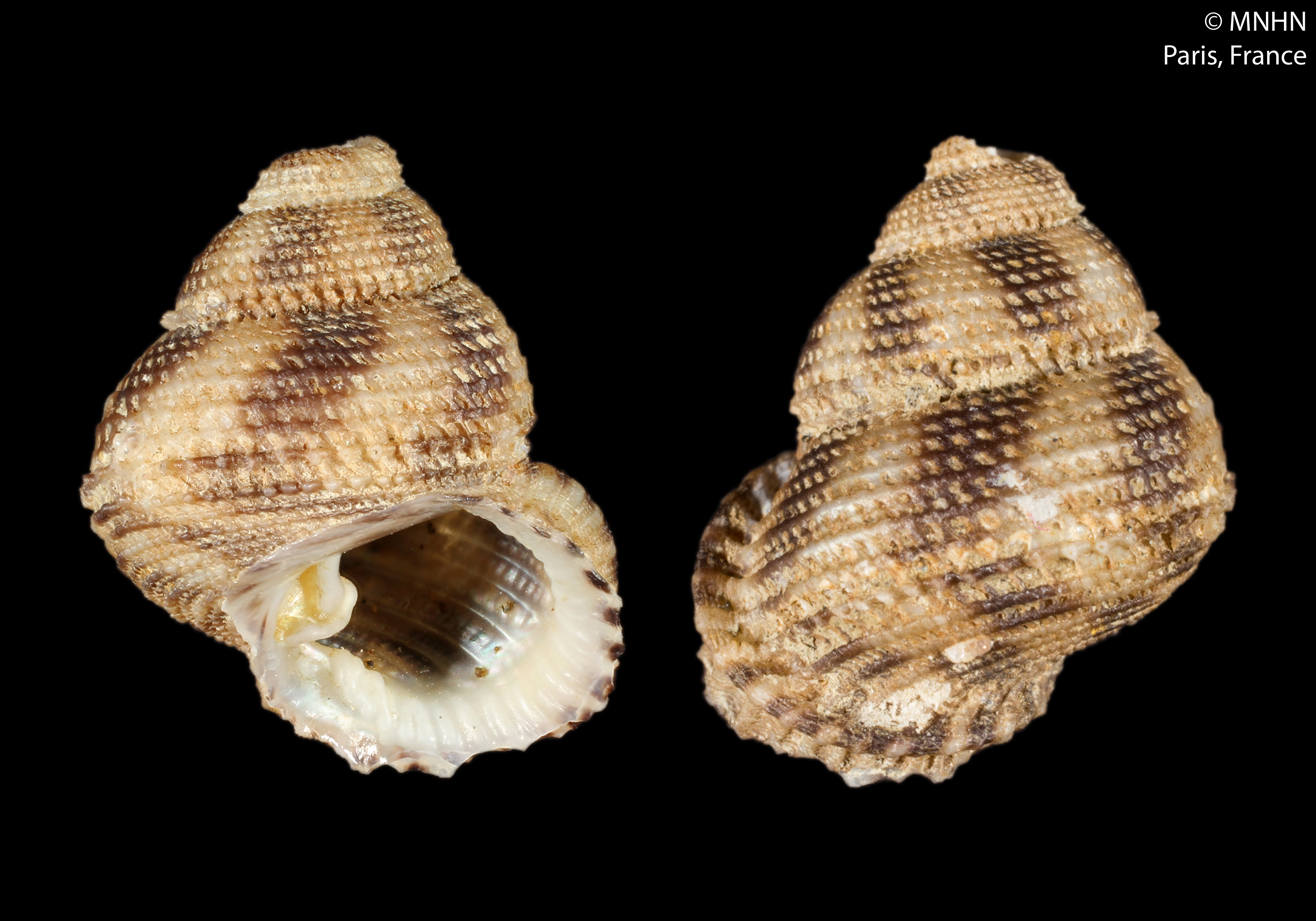

Scientific classification
- Kingdom: Animalia
- Phylum: Mollusca
- Class: Gastropoda
- Subclass: Vetigastropoda
- Family: Chilodontaidae
- Genus: Danilia
- Species: D. discordata

Binomial name
- Danilia discordata Vilvens & Heros, 2005

= Danilia discordata =

Species of gastropod

Danilia discordata is a species of sea snail, a marine gastropod mollusc in the family Chilodontaidae.

== Distribution ==
This species occurs in the western Pacific Ocean.
