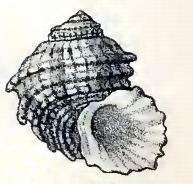
- Drawing with an apertural view of the shell of Vaceuchelus semilugubris

Scientific classification
- Kingdom: Animalia
- Phylum: Mollusca
- Class: Gastropoda
- Subclass: Vetigastropoda
- Family: Chilodontaidae
- Genus: Vaceuchelus
- Species: V. semilugubris

Binomial name
- Vaceuchelus semilugubris (Deshayes, 1863)

Synonyms
- Leptothyra semilugubris (Deshayes, 1863); Turbo semilugubris Deshayes, 1863

= Vaceuchelus semilugubris =

Species of gastropod

Vaceuchelus semilugubris is a species of sea snail, a marine gastropod mollusc in the family Chilodontaidae.

== Description ==
The height of the shell attains 3.5 mm. The small shell has a turbinate, subglobose shape. Its color is white, marbled with black. The spire is somewhat obtuse. The five whorls are declivous above and spirally deeply sulcate. The sulci are subgranulose. The body whorl is large with a perforate base. The very oblique aperture is circular and pearly within. The flat columella is arcuate and truncate anteriorly.

== Distribution ==
This marine shell occurs in the Indian Ocean off Réunion and Mauritius.
