= Euchelus dampierensis =

Scientific classification
- Kingdom: Animalia
- Phylum: Mollusca
- Class: Gastropoda
- Subclass: Vetigastropoda
- Family: Chilodontaidae
- Genus: Euchelus
- Species: E. dampierensis

Binomial name
- Euchelus dampierensis Jansen, 1994

Species of gastropod

Euchelus dampierensis is a species of sea snail, a marine gastropod mollusc in the family Chilodontaidae.
