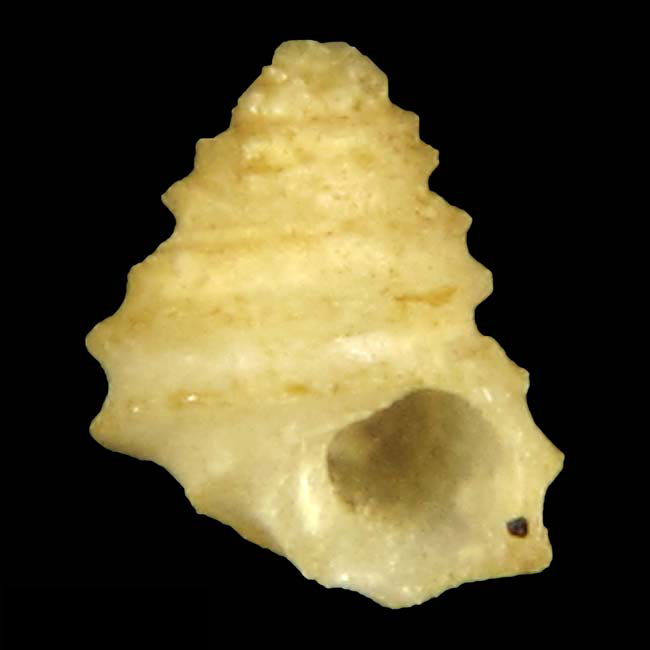

Scientific classification
- Kingdom: Animalia
- Phylum: Mollusca
- Class: Gastropoda
- Subclass: Vetigastropoda
- Family: Chilodontaidae
- Genus: Vaceuchelus
- Species: V. vallesi

Binomial name
- Vaceuchelus vallesi Poppe, Tagaro & Dekker, 2006

= Vaceuchelus vallesi =

Species of gastropod

Vaceuchelus vallesi is a species of sea snail, a marine gastropod mollusc in the family Chilodontaidae.

== Description ==
The height of this yellow shell attains 2.3 mm.

== Distribution ==
This marine species occurs off the Philippines.
