= Euchelus bitoi =

Scientific classification
- Kingdom: Animalia
- Phylum: Mollusca
- Class: Gastropoda
- Subclass: Vetigastropoda
- Family: Chilodontaidae
- Genus: Euchelus
- Species: E. bitoi

Binomial name
- Euchelus bitoi Nomura & Hatai, 1940

Species of gastropod

Euchelus bitoi is a species of sea snail, a marine gastropod mollusc in the family Chilodontaidae.

== Distribution ==
This marine species occurs off Japan.
