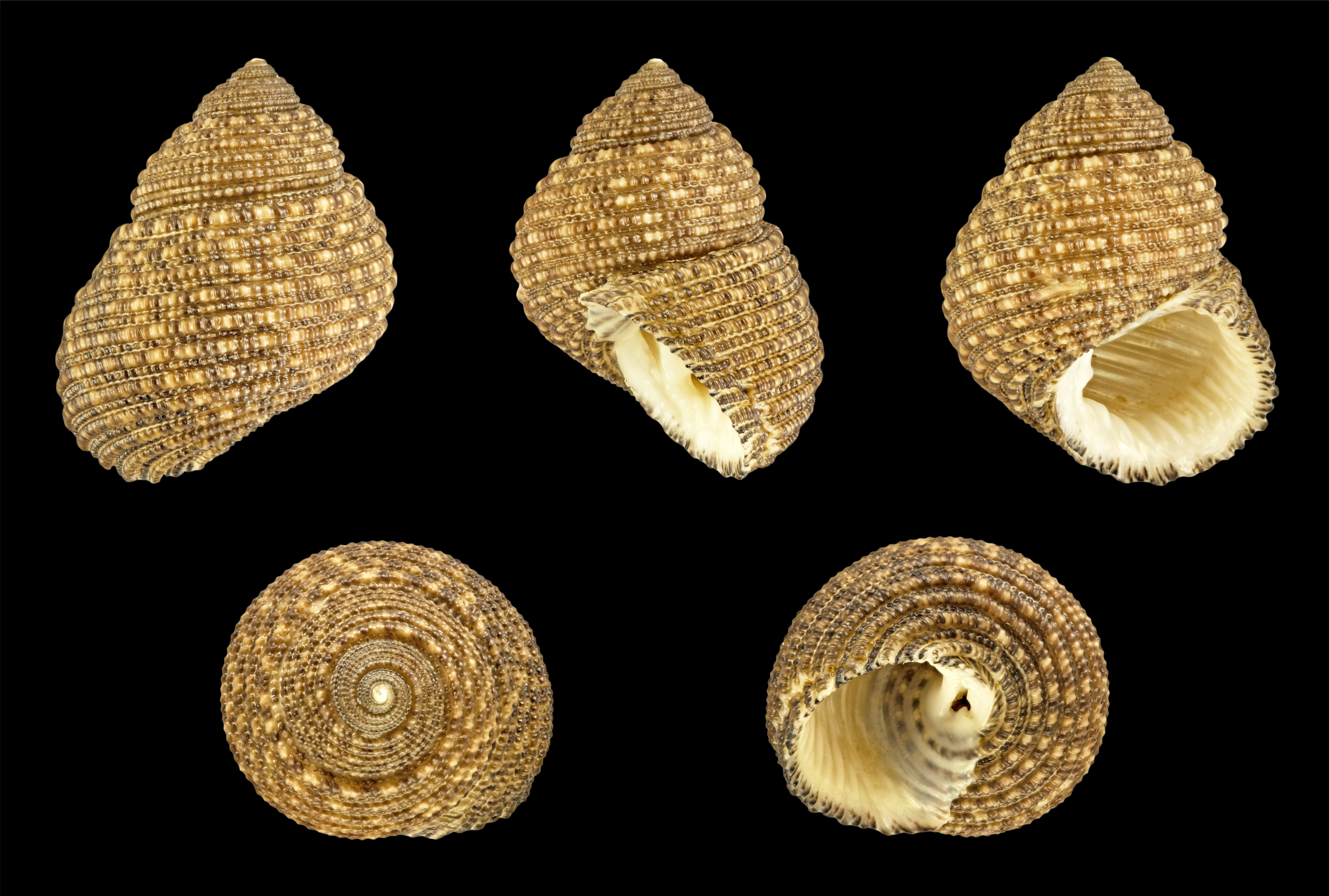

Scientific classification
- Kingdom: Animalia
- Phylum: Mollusca
- Class: Gastropoda
- Subclass: Vetigastropoda
- Family: Chilodontaidae
- Genus: Euchelus
- Species: E. atratus

Binomial name
- Euchelus atratus (Gmelin, 1791)

Synonyms
- Angaria atrata (Gmelin, 1791); Euchelus denigratus Chemnitz; Herpetopoma atratum (Gmelin, 1791); Monodonta tamsi auct. non Dunker, R.W.; Monodonta punctulata auct. non Lamarck, J.B.P.A. de, 1822; Nerita atrata Gmelin, 1791; Trochus canaliculatus Lamarck, 1818; Turbo atratus Gmelin, 1791 (original combination)

= Euchelus atratus =

Species of gastropod

Euchelus atratus, common name the blackish margarite, is a species of sea snail, a marine gastropod mollusk in the family Chilodontaidae.

== Description ==
The size of the shell varies between 5 mm and 21 mm. The solid, umbilicate shell has a globose-conic shape. Its color is black, brown, or grayish-pink, either unicolored or tessellated with dark spots. The conic spire is short. The sutures are deeply canaliculate. The 5-6 convex whorls are encircled by numerous equal, densely, finely beaded spiral ribs, with deep interstices, in each of which an interstitial riblet arises on the last part of the body whorl. The spiral ribs on the penultimate whorl number 7 to 9. On the body whorl they number 12, exclusive of the interstitial riblets. The convex body whorl is rounded, quite abruptly and decidedly descending at the aperture. The rounded aperture is strongly, finely sulcate inside. The columella is straight, with a small projecting tooth at base. The umbilicus is deep, bounded by a strong white rib, about 1 mm. diameter.

Larger specimens (16–23 mm. alt.) are paler, and have a small riblet developed in each interstice, thus about doubling the number of spirals.

== Distribution ==
This species occurs in the Red Sea and in the Indian Ocean off the Mascarene Basin.
