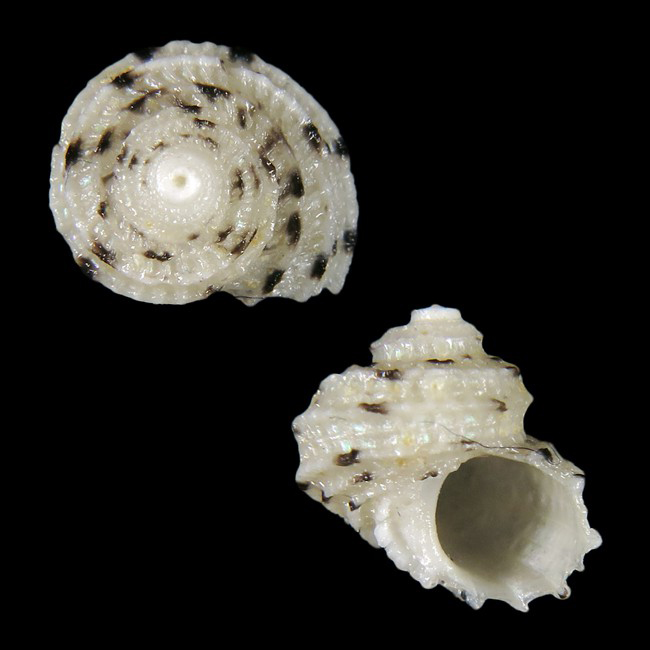

Scientific classification
- Kingdom: Animalia
- Phylum: Mollusca
- Class: Gastropoda
- Subclass: Vetigastropoda
- Family: Chilodontaidae
- Genus: Vaceuchelus
- Species: V. entienzai

Binomial name
- Vaceuchelus entienzai Poppe, Tagaro & Dekker, 2016

= Vaceuchelus entienzai =

Species of gastropod

Vaceuchelus entienzai is a species of sea snail, a marine gastropod mollusk in the family Chilodontaidae.

== Original description ==
- Poppe G.T. & Tagaro S. (2016). New marine mollusks from the central Philippines in the families Aclididae, Chilodontidae, Cuspidariidae, Nuculanidae, Nystiellidae, Seraphsidae and Vanikoridae. Visaya. 4(5): 83–103. page(s): 89.
