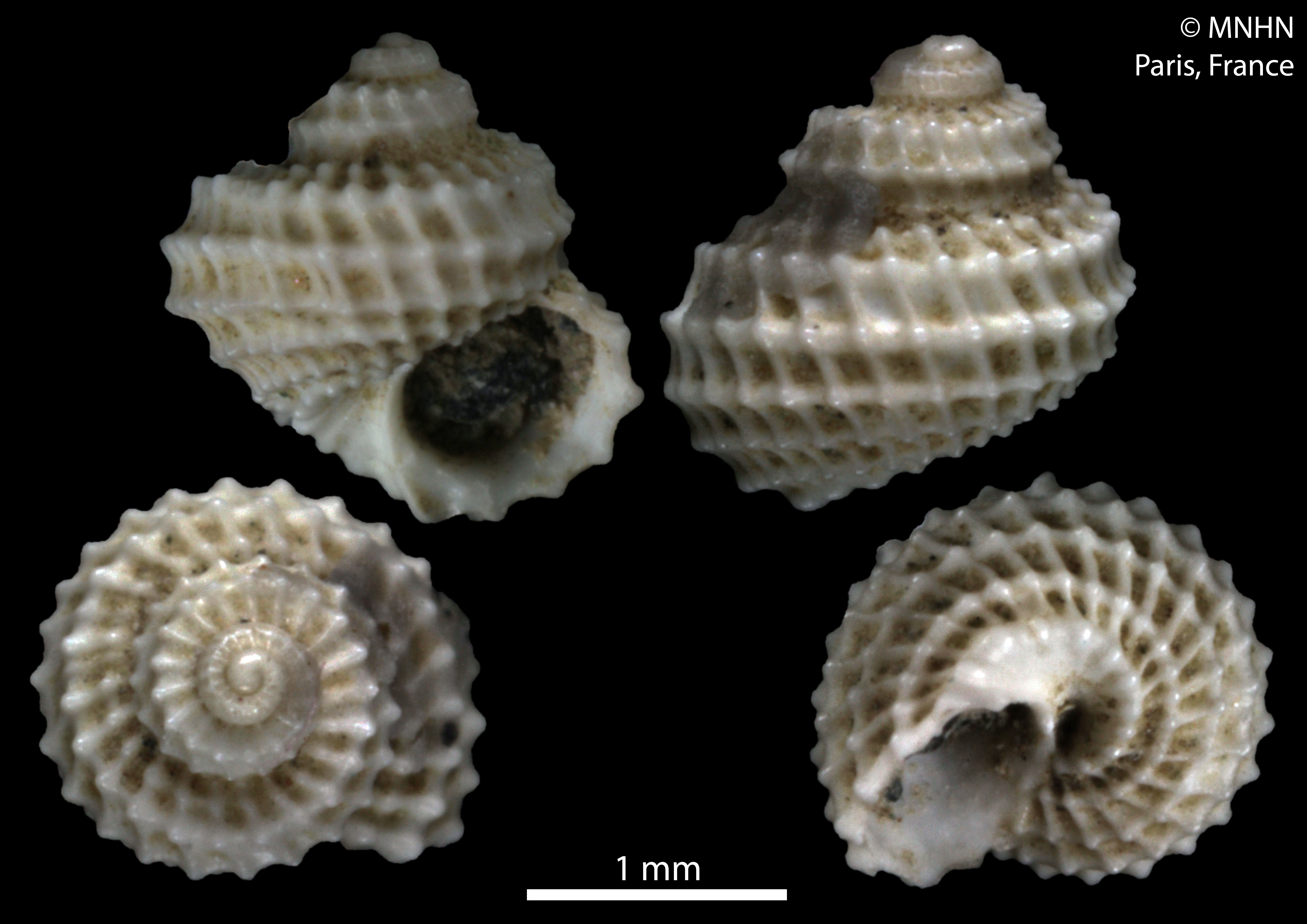
- Shell of Vaceuchelus abdii (paratype at MNHN, Paris)

Scientific classification
- Kingdom: Animalia
- Phylum: Mollusca
- Class: Gastropoda
- Subclass: Vetigastropoda
- Family: Chilodontaidae
- Genus: Vaceuchelus
- Species: V. abdii

Binomial name
- Vaceuchelus abdii Poppe, Tagaro & Dekker, 2006

= Vaceuchelus abdii =

Species of gastropod

Vaceuchelus abdii is a species of sea snail, a marine gastropod mollusc in the family Chilodontaidae.

== Description ==
The height of the shell attains 2 mm.

== Distribution ==
This marine species occurs off the Philippines.
