= Euchelus eucastus =

Scientific classification
- Kingdom: Animalia
- Phylum: Mollusca
- Class: Gastropoda
- Subclass: Vetigastropoda
- Family: Chilodontaidae
- Genus: Euchelus
- Species: E. eucastus

Binomial name
- Euchelus eucastus Dall, 1927

Synonyms
- Euchelus eucasta Dall, 1927 (original combination)

Species of gastropod

Euchelus eucastus is a species of sea snail, a marine gastropod mollusc in the family Chilodontaidae.

== Description ==
The length of the shell attains 6.5 mm.

== Distribution ==
This species occurs in the Atlantic Ocean off Georgia, USA at a depth of 805 m.
