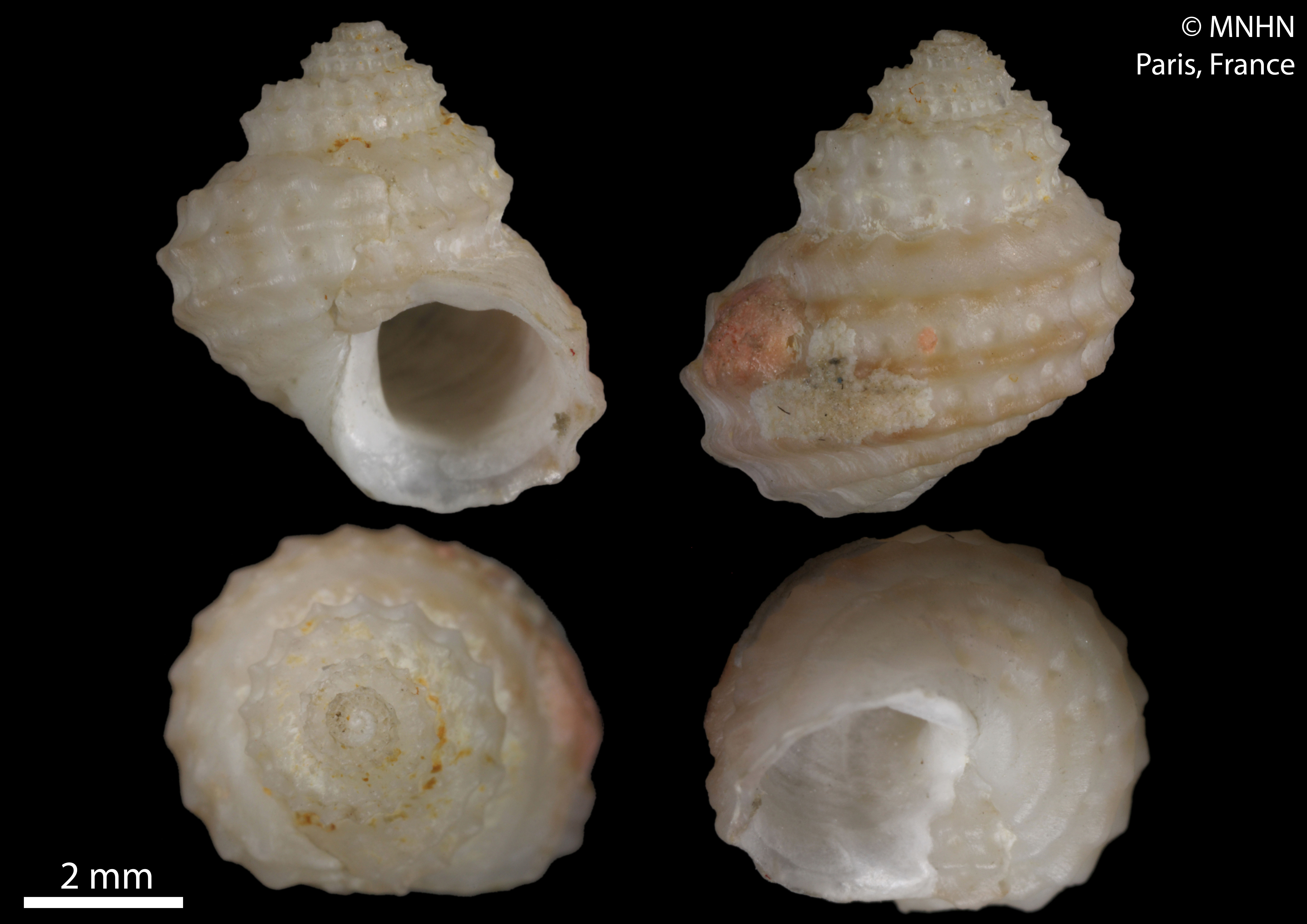
- Shell of Vaceuchelus pagoboorum (paratype at MNHN, Paris)

Scientific classification
- Kingdom: Animalia
- Phylum: Mollusca
- Class: Gastropoda
- Subclass: Vetigastropoda
- Family: Chilodontaidae
- Genus: Vaceuchelus
- Species: V. pagoboorum

Binomial name
- Vaceuchelus pagoboorum Poppe, Tagaro & Dekker, 2006

= Vaceuchelus pagoboorum =

Species of gastropod

Vaceuchelus pagoboorum is a species of sea snail, a marine gastropod mollusc in the family Chilodontaidae.

== Description ==
The size of the shell varies between 4.7 mm and 7.5 mm.

== Distribution ==
This marine species occurs off the Philippines.
