= Danilia insperata =

Scientific classification
- Kingdom: Animalia
- Phylum: Mollusca
- Class: Gastropoda
- Subclass: Vetigastropoda
- Family: Chilodontaidae
- Genus: Danilia
- Species: D. insperata

Binomial name
- Danilia insperata Beu & Climo, 1974

Species of gastropod

Danilia insperata is a species of sea snail, a marine gastropod mollusc, in the family Chilodontaidae.

== Distribution ==
This marine species is endemic to New Zealand.
