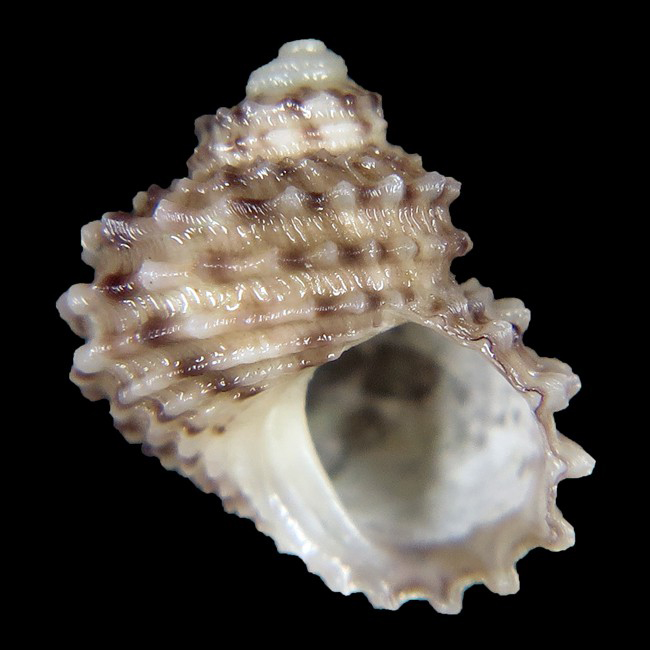

Scientific classification
- Kingdom: Animalia
- Phylum: Mollusca
- Class: Gastropoda
- Subclass: Vetigastropoda
- Family: Chilodontaidae
- Genus: Euchelus
- Species: E. decora

Binomial name
- Euchelus decora Poppe & Tagaro, 2016

= Euchelus decora =

Species of gastropod

Euchelus decora is a species of sea snail, a marine gastropod mollusk in the family Chilodontaidae.

== Original description ==
- Poppe G.T. & Tagaro S. (2016). New marine mollusks from the central Philippines in the families Aclididae, Chilodontidae, Cuspidariidae, Nuculanidae, Nystiellidae, Seraphsidae and Vanikoridae. Visaya. 4(5): 83-103. page(s): 88.
