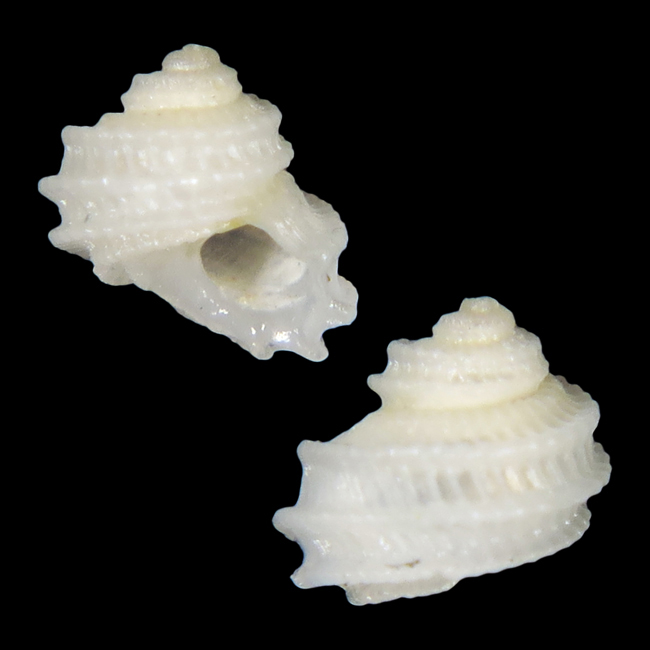

Scientific classification
- Kingdom: Animalia
- Phylum: Mollusca
- Class: Gastropoda
- Subclass: Vetigastropoda
- Superfamily: Seguenzioidea
- Family: Chilodontaidae
- Genus: Vaceuchelus
- Species: V. favosus

Binomial name
- Vaceuchelus favosus (Melvill & Standen, 1896)

Synonyms
- Euchelus favosus Melvill & Standen, 1896; Vaceuchelus saguili Poppe, Tagaro & H. Dekker, 2006

= Vaceuchelus favosus =

Species of gastropod

Vaceuchelus favosus is a species of sea snail, a marine gastropod mollusk in the family Chilodontaidae.

== Description ==
The height of the shell attains 2.6 mm (0.10 in). The shell lacks apertural dentition.

The shell is very small, but most beautiful in sculpture. It is pure white. Ithe shell contains four whorls, including the depressed apex. The sutures are deeply canaliculate. The second and third whorls are twice, the last six times keeled, including the spiral keel round the umbilicus. These keels are longitudinally joined by stout lirae, the interstices being honeycombed. The carinse are most elegantly sharply crenulate all round. The aperture is round. The outer lip is rough with the edges of the keels, within smooth.

== Distribution ==
This is a poorly known marine species from the Loyalty Islands.
