= Euchelus circulatus =

Scientific classification
- Domain: Eukaryota
- Kingdom: Animalia
- Phylum: Mollusca
- Class: Gastropoda
- Subclass: Vetigastropoda
- Family: Chilodontaidae
- Genus: Euchelus
- Species: E. circulatus

Binomial name
- Euchelus circulatus (Anton, 1849)

Species of sea snail

Euchelus circulatus is a species of sea snail in the family Chilodontaidae.
