= Vaceuchelus cretaceus =

Scientific classification
- Kingdom: Animalia
- Phylum: Mollusca
- Class: Gastropoda
- Subclass: Vetigastropoda
- Family: Chilodontaidae
- Genus: Vaceuchelus
- Species: V. cretaceus

Binomial name
- Vaceuchelus cretaceus Herbert, 2012

Synonyms
- Euchelus scrobiculatus non Souverbie, 1866

Species of gastropod

Vaceuchelus cretaceus is a species of sea snail, a marine gastropod mollusc in the family Chilodontaidae.

== Description ==
The height of the whitish to dirty buff shell attains 8.5 mm. The shell has an elevated turbiniform shape with 4.5 to 5 whorls. The columella has a typical low, rounded swelling at its base.

== Distribution ==
This species occurs in the southwestern Indian Ocean, off Réunion, Southern Mozambique and Northern KwaZulu-Natal.
