= Vaceuchelus cavernosus =

Scientific classification
- Kingdom: Animalia
- Phylum: Mollusca
- Class: Gastropoda
- Subclass: Vetigastropoda
- Family: Chilodontaidae
- Genus: Vaceuchelus
- Species: V. cavernosus

Binomial name
- Vaceuchelus cavernosus (G.B. Sowerby III, 1905)

Synonyms
- Euchelus cavernosus G. B. Sowerby III, 1905 (original combination)

Species of gastropod

Vaceuchelus cavernosus is a species of sea snail, a marine gastropod mollusk in the family Chilodontaidae.

== Description ==
The altitude of the shell attains 7½ mm, its maximum diameter 7¼ mm.

A small globular white shell, containing five whorls; very conspicuously and profoundly pitted between the rounded nodulous keels.

== Distribution ==
This marine species occurs off Sri Lanka.
