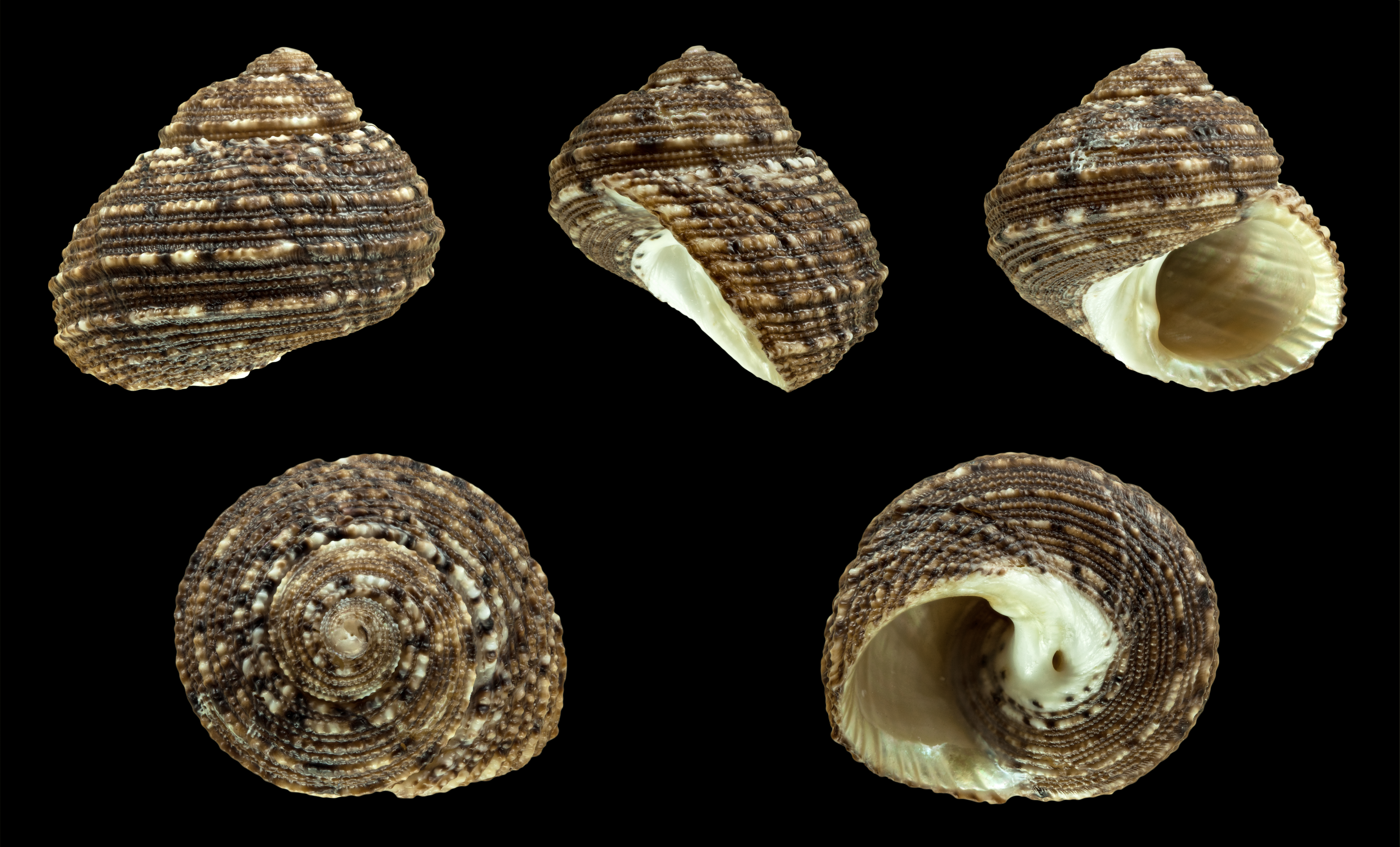
- A shell of Euchelus asper

Scientific classification
- Kingdom: Animalia
- Phylum: Mollusca
- Class: Gastropoda
- Subclass: Vetigastropoda
- Family: Chilodontaidae
- Genus: Euchelus
- Species: E. asper

Binomial name
- Euchelus asper (Gmelin, 1791)

Synonyms
- Euchelus alabastrum (Reeve, 1858); Euchelus proximus A. Adams, 1854; Euchelus quadricarinatus (Holten, 1802); Trochus alabastrum Reeve, 1858; Trochus asper Gmelin, 1791 (original combination); Trochus quadricarinatus Holten, 1802; Trochus tricarinatus Lamarck, 1818

= Euchelus asper =

Species of gastropod

Euchelus asper is a species of sea snail, a marine gastropod mollusc in the family Chilodontaidae.

== Description ==
The size of the shell varies between 6 mm and 35 mm. The thick, conoidal shell is imperforate in adult specimens. Its color is dull ashen, dotted with brown, rosy, and black. The 5½-6 convex whorls are separated by profound sutures, the first one eroded, the rest rough. They are ornamented with close, granulose, unequal cinguli (the colored bands or spiral ornamentation), with two on the upper, and 3 or 4 on the body whorl more prominent. The penultimate whorl has 12-15 lirae. The globose body whorl is rounded, descending, and convex beneath. The aperture is ovate-rounded, the margins nearly continuous, plicated finely all around. The columella is arcuate. The base of the shell is dentate.

This species is highly variable. It is also known under the form Euchelus asper quadricarinatus (Holten, H.S., 1802) (synonym: Trochus alabastrum Reeve, 1858), common name the four-keeled margarite. The size of the shell varies between 6 mm and 12 mm. It is found in the Indo-Pacific.

== Distribution ==
This species occurs in the Indo-West Pacific.
