= Herpetopoma alarconi =

Scientific classification
- Kingdom: Animalia
- Phylum: Mollusca
- Class: Gastropoda
- Subclass: Vetigastropoda
- Family: Chilodontaidae
- Genus: Herpetopoma
- Species: H. alarconi

Binomial name
- Herpetopoma alarconi (Rehder, 1980)

Synonyms
- Euchelus alarconi Rehder, 1980; Euchelus foveolatus auct.; Euchelus gemmatus auct.

Species of gastropod

Herpetopoma alarconi is a species of sea snail, a marine gastropod mollusc in the family Chilodontaidae.

== Description ==
The length of the shell varies between 3.8 mm and 5 mm.

== Distribution ==
This species is found in the Pacific Ocean off Easter Island.
