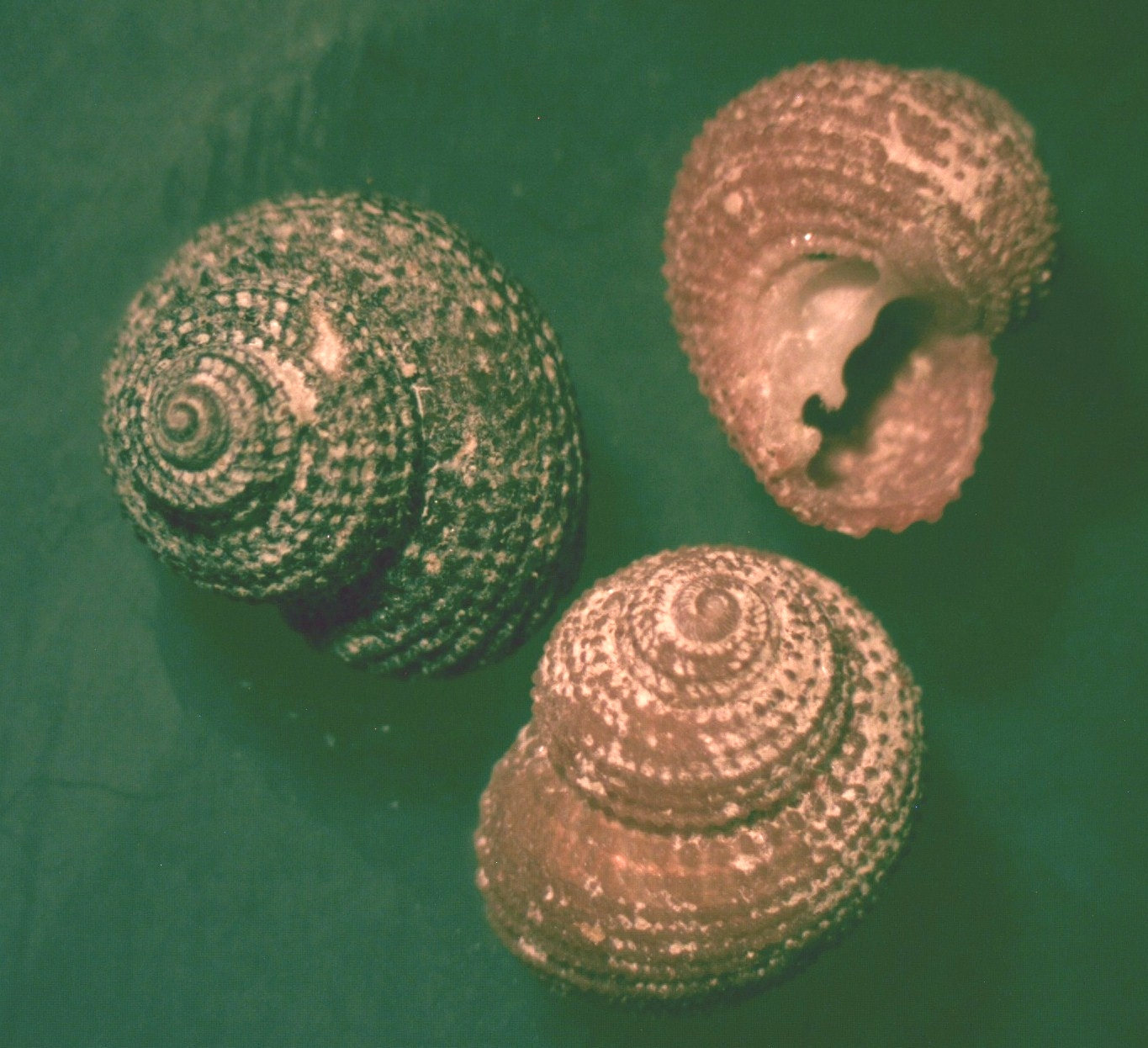
- Three views of a shell of Herpetopoma rubrum

Scientific classification
- Kingdom: Animalia
- Phylum: Mollusca
- Class: Gastropoda
- Subclass: Vetigastropoda
- Family: Chilodontaidae
- Genus: Herpetopoma
- Species: H. rubrum

Binomial name
- Herpetopoma rubrum (A. Adams, 1853)

Synonyms
- Euchelus hachijoensis Pilsbry, 1904; Euchelus ruber (A. Adams, 1851); Euchelus ruber brunneus Pilsbry, 1901; Euchelus rubra (A. Adams, 1851); Monodonta rubra A. Adams, 1851 (original combination)

= Herpetopoma rubrum =

Species of gastropod

Herpetopoma rubrum is a species of sea snail, a marine gastropod mollusc in the family Chilodontaidae.

== Description ==
The size of the shell varies between 4 mm and 15 mm. The umbilicate, solid shell has a conical shape. It has a bright rose or carmine color. The elevated spire is acute. The 5–6, convex whorls are rounded, encircled by alternately larger and smaller closely beaded riblets, numbering 9 on the penultimate, 4 on the next earlier whorl, about 14 on the last whorl, of equal size on its latter portion. The sutures are narrowly canaliculate. The body whorl is rounded. The rounded aperture is finely sulcate inside. The columella is straight, toothed at base, with a narrow, deep square notch between the tooth and the tubercles of the basal lip.

== Distribution ==
This marine species occurs off Southern Japan and Australia.
