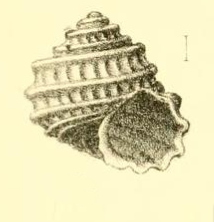
- Shell of Vaceuchelus natalensis (holotype)

Scientific classification
- Kingdom: Animalia
- Phylum: Mollusca
- Class: Gastropoda
- Subclass: Vetigastropoda
- Family: Chilodontaidae
- Genus: Vaceuchelus
- Species: V. natalensis

Binomial name
- Vaceuchelus natalensis (E. A. Smith, 1906)

Synonyms
- Euchelus natalensis E. A. Smith, 1906

= Vaceuchelus natalensis =

Species of gastropod

Vaceuchelus natalensis is a species of sea snail, a marine gastropod mollusc in the family Chilodontaidae.

== Description ==
The size of the shell varies between 2 mm and 4 mm.

A beautiful little, dark white, globose-turbinate species that contains 4½ whorls. It is allied to A. foveolatus (A. Adams, 1853) from Lord Hood Island. It is, however, much smaller than that species. It is more delicately sculptured, the spiral keels being regular and simple, whereas in A. foveolatus they are subspinose where the oblique lamellas join them. Besides the six carinas mentioned above, a seventh is noticeable upon the body whorl close to the suture, and this may be traced upon the penultimate volution also.

== Distribution ==
This marine species occurs off KwaZuluNatal, South Africa.
