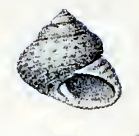
- Drawing of a shell of Clanculus tonnerrei

Scientific classification
- Kingdom: Animalia
- Phylum: Mollusca
- Class: Gastropoda
- Subclass: Vetigastropoda
- Order: Trochida
- Superfamily: Trochoidea
- Family: Trochidae
- Genus: Clanculus
- Species: C. tonnerrei

Binomial name
- Clanculus tonnerrei (G. Nevill & H. Nevill, 1874)

Synonyms
- Clanculus (Clanculopsis) tonnerrei (G. Nevill & H. Nevill, 1874); Clanculus assabensis Caramagna, 1888; Clanculus gennesi (H. Fisher & Vignal, 1901); Clanculus gibbonsi G.B. Sowerby III, 1912; Euchelus bicinctus auct. non Philippi, 1849; Euchelus erythraeensis Sturany, 1903; Trochus satrapius von Martens; Trochus tonnerrei G. Nevill & H. Nevill, 1874 (original description)

= Clanculus tonnerrei =

Species of gastropod

Clanculus tonnerrei is a species of sea snail, a marine gastropod mollusk in the family Trochidae, the top snails.

Many specimens of Clanculus tonnerrei (G & H Nevill 1874) have been misidentified as belonging to Euchelus bicinctus, following a misidentification of Issel (1869) (Herbert, 1996).

== Description ==
The height of the shell attains 14 mm, its diameter 14 1/2 mm. The umbilicate shell has a conoidal shape. It is granulate-cingulate with the cinguli unequally elevated. The smaller ones are interpolated, numbering 5 to 6 between suture and the periphery, 7 to 8 on the base of the body whorl obtusely angulated. The granules are rosy-red colored with white subalternating. The suture is moderate. The very oblique aperture is subquadrangular. Its fauces is sulcate, corresponding to the ridges of the exterior. The outer margin is obtuse and subcrenulated. The basal margin is plicatulate. The columella is disjoined and prominently denticulate above, oblique, with 1 or 2 tubercles where it joins the basal margin. The white umbilicus is narrow. Its margin is not crenate, with an elevated fold within the periphery.

(Description of Euchelus bicinctus auct. non Philippi, 1849 by Philippi) The small, conical shell is perforate, and transversely striate. It color is white, radiated with rose. The shell is angular below the suture, the angle nodose. The body whorl is carinated in the middle. The base is rounded. The aperture as high as wide. The throat is striated. The columella is arcuate, terminating in a bipartite tooth at the base.

(Further description by G.W. Tryon) There are 5 whorls. Above the shoulder angle there are two shallow spiral furrows. Between this and the peripheral carina there are 4, of equal breadth to the elevated interspaces; and on the base about 12.

== Distribution ==
This species occurs in the Red Sea and in the Indian Ocean off Djibouti, the Mascarene basin, Kenya, Mozambique and Tanzania.
