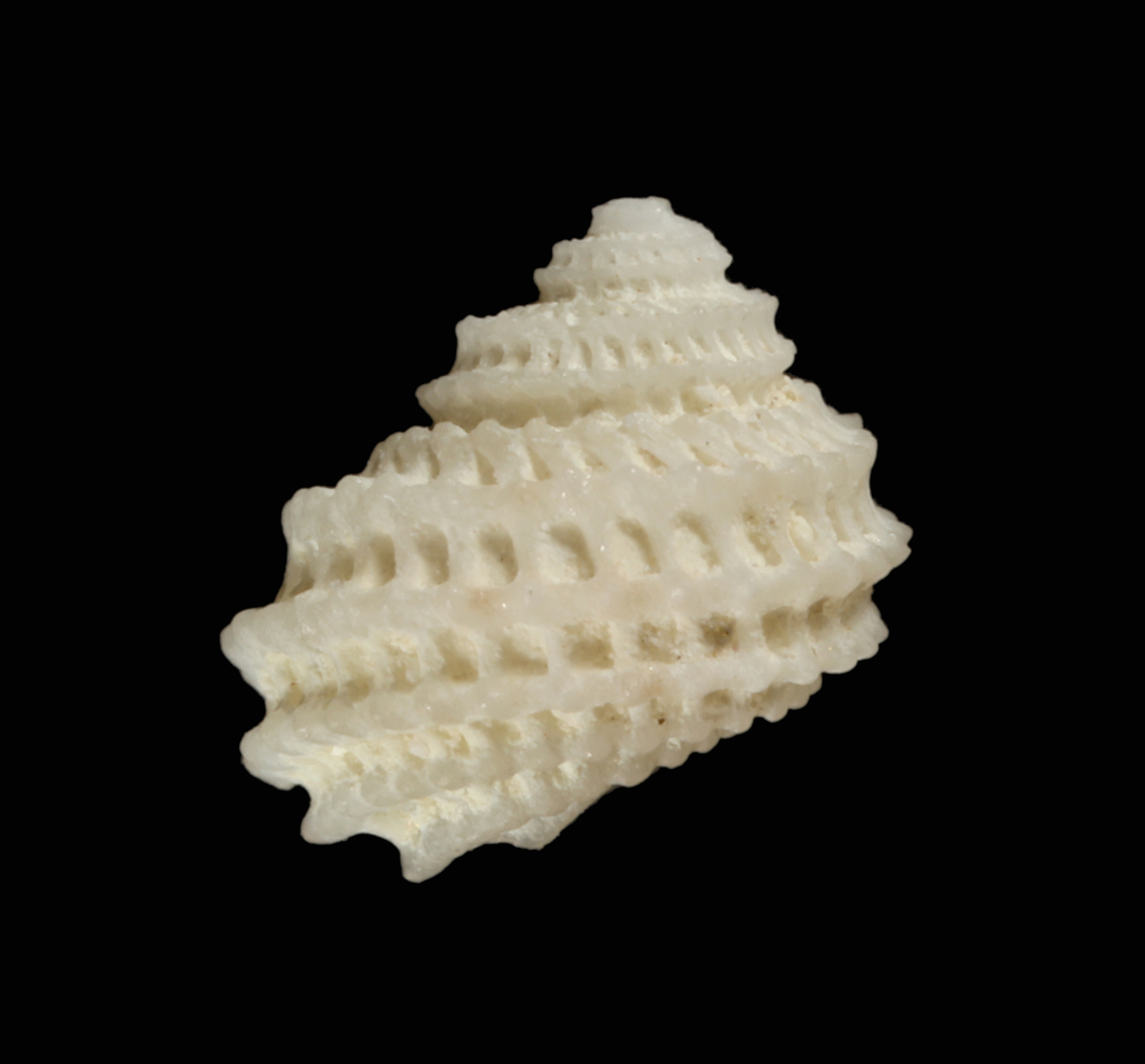

Scientific classification
- Kingdom: Animalia
- Phylum: Mollusca
- Class: Gastropoda
- Subclass: Vetigastropoda
- Family: Chilodontaidae
- Genus: Vaceuchelus
- Species: V. foveolatus

Binomial name
- Vaceuchelus foveolatus (A. Adams, 1853)

Synonyms
- Euchelus (Herpetopoma) foveolatus (A. Adams, 1851); Euchelus angulatus Pearse, 1867; Herpetopoma foveolatum (A. Adams, 1853); Monodonta (Aradasia) foveolata A. Adams, 1853 · unaccepted (basionym); Monodonta foveolata A. Adams, 1853; Vaceuchelus angulatus (Pease, 1868) junior subjective synonym

= Vaceuchelus foveolatus =

Species of gastropod

Vaceuchelus foveolatus is a species of sea snail, a marine gastropod mollusc in the family Chilodontaidae.

== Description ==
The height of the shell reaches 8 mm. The small, solid, white, very minutely perforated shell has a globose-conic shape. The spire is short. The four whorls are convex and encircled by strong spiral ribs. The interstices between them are deeply, coarsely pitted by the prominence of strong, regular, longitudinal lamellae, continuous over the spirals. The penultimate and next earlier whorls have 3 spirals (the subsutural one sometimes subobsolete). The outer lip is inserted upon the fourth. On the body whorl near the aperture there are 7, but sometimes more, by reason of the interpolation of one or two interstitial riblets on the upper surface. Two or three submedian ribs are generally more prominent. The sutures are canaliculate. The aperture is rounded. The columella is slightly concave, rather wide and flat, but not toothed at base. The umbilical perforation is minute.

This is a very distinct little shell, with coarsely latticed sculpture.

== Distribution ==
This marine species occurs off Northern Queensland, Australia, in the Tuamotu Archipelago, Polynesia and the Philippines.
