= Vaceuchelus gemmula =

Scientific classification
- Kingdom: Animalia
- Phylum: Mollusca
- Class: Gastropoda
- Subclass: Vetigastropoda
- Family: Chilodontaidae
- Genus: Vaceuchelus
- Species: V. gemmula

Binomial name
- Vaceuchelus gemmula (Turton, 1932)

Synonyms
- Euchelus gemmula Turton, 1932

Species of gastropod

Vaceuchelus gemmula is a species of sea snail, a marine gastropod mollusc in the family Chilodontaidae.

== Distribution ==
This marine species is the only species in the family Chilodontidae to be endemic to South Africa
