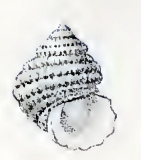
- Drawing of a shell of Vaceuchelus scrobiculatus

Scientific classification
- Kingdom: Animalia
- Phylum: Mollusca
- Class: Gastropoda
- Subclass: Vetigastropoda
- Family: Chilodontaidae
- Genus: Vaceuchelus
- Species: V. scrobiculatus

Binomial name
- Vaceuchelus scrobiculatus (Souverbie, 1886)

Synonyms
- Euchelus scrobiculatus (Souverbie, 1886); Trochus scrobiculatus Souverbie, 1886

= Vaceuchelus scrobiculatus =

Species of gastropod

Vaceuchelus scrobiculatus is a species of sea snail, a marine gastropod mollusc in the family Chilodontaidae.

== Description ==
The height of the shell attains 8 mm. The imperforate, dull white shell has an ovate-conic, subventricose shape. The apex rather obtuse. The shell is ornamented with strong spiral subnodose ribs, decussated by elevated rib-striae cutting the interstices into square pits, of which there are 3 or 4 series on the third whorl, 4 on the penultimate, and 7 on the last. The five whorls are rounded and separated by a deep, subcanaliculate suture. The oblique aperture is rounded, and sub-pearly. The outer lip is duplicate. It has an acute edge. it is crenulated, and sulcate inside. The simple columella is vertical.

== Distribution ==
This species is distributed in the Red Sea and in the Indian Ocean off Réunion; also off New Caledonia, the Loyalty Islands, Vanuatu, Fiji, the Philippines.
