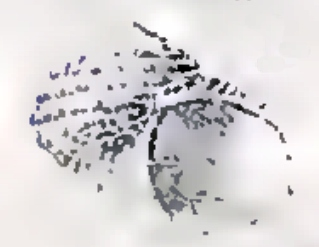
- Drawing with an apertural view of a shell of Euchelus mysticus

Scientific classification
- Kingdom: Animalia
- Phylum: Mollusca
- Class: Gastropoda
- Subclass: Vetigastropoda
- Family: Chilodontaidae
- Genus: Euchelus
- Species: E. mysticus

Binomial name
- Euchelus mysticus Pilsbry, 1889

Synonyms
- Hybochelus mysticus Pilsbry, 1890; Vaceuchelus mysticus (Pilsbry, 1890)

= Euchelus mysticus =

Species of gastropod

Euchelus mysticus, common name the mysticus margarite, is a species of sea snail, a marine gastropod mollusc in the family Chilodontaidae.

== Description ==
The height of the globose-depressed shell attains 7 mm. Its color is yellowish-white, with purple-brown dots on the spiral ribs. The conic spire is very short and imperforate. The 4½ or 5 whorls increase very rapidly in size. The nuclear whorl is smooth, the remainder clathrate with strong spiral ribs crossed by elevated, close, vertical striae, which crenulate the ribs and cut the interstices into pits. There are 3 stronger spirals on the penultimate whorl, with a riblet in each interval. On the earlier whorls there are only 3 spirals. The body whorl at its termination has about 27 spirals. The base if the shell has about 8, alternating in size. There is a strong spiral bordering the closed umbilicus. The large, quite oblique aperture is expanded, slightly sulcate inside. The simple columella is concave flattened, and above reflexed. It is connected with the upper margin of the peristome by a short shining parietal callus.

== Distribution ==
This species occurs in the Southwest Pacific.
