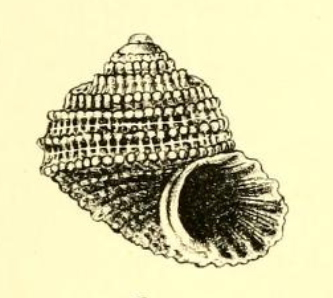
- Shell of Vaceuchelus ampullus (holotype)

Scientific classification
- Kingdom: Animalia
- Phylum: Mollusca
- Class: Gastropoda
- Subclass: Vetigastropoda
- Family: Chilodontaidae
- Genus: Vaceuchelus
- Species: V. ampullus

Binomial name
- Vaceuchelus ampullus (Tate, 1893)

Synonyms
- Euchelus ampullus Tate, 1893

= Vaceuchelus ampullus =

Species of gastropod

Vaceuchelus ampullus is a species of sea snail, a marine gastropod mollusc in the family Chilodontaidae.

== Description ==
(Original description)The shell is globose-conic, imperforate in the young, narrowly umbilicated or reduced to a fissure in the adult. It is whitish, spotted with red on the revolving ribs. The whorls of the spire are quadrate, separated by a linear suture. The body whorl is convex, except a little flattening at the suture.

The sculpture of the penultimate whorl consists of three equally thick, obtuse, and plain cinguli (= colored bands or spiral ornamentation), separated from one another and from the sutures by nearly equal interspaces, with or without a small riblet in each interval. All over regularly clathrate, the interstitial pits are narrowly oblong. The body whorl contains about eight cinguli, clathrate in the intervals: the supra-peripheral intervals show a riblet. The four basal cinguli are granulose.

The aperture is roundly oval. The outer and basal margins are smooth within. The columella is arcuate, slightly explanulate concave and edentulous.

== Distribution ==
This marine species is endemic to Australia (New South Wales, Queensland, South Australia, Tasmania, Victoria, Western Australia).
