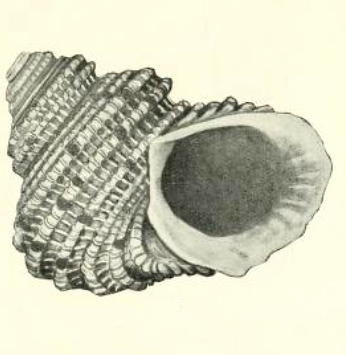
- Shell of Vaceuchelus profundior (holotype)

Scientific classification
- Kingdom: Animalia
- Phylum: Mollusca
- Class: Gastropoda
- Subclass: Vetigastropoda
- Family: Chilodontaidae
- Genus: Vaceuchelus
- Species: V. profundior

Binomial name
- Vaceuchelus profundior (May, 1915)

Synonyms
- Euchelus profundior May, 1915; Euchelus (Vaceuchelus) profundior (May, 1915)

= Vaceuchelus profundior =

Species of gastropod

Vaceuchelus profundior, common name the deepwater top shell, is a species of sea snail, a marine gastropod mollusc in the family Chilodontaidae.

== Description ==
The height of the shell attains 4.5mm, maximum diameter 4 mm.

(Original description) The shell is rather slender and elevated. Its colour is whitish to yellowish, with irregularly scattered dark brown spots on the keels. (Some co-types have few or no spots.) The shell contains four rounded whorls. The spire is bicarinate, with two smaller keels on the shoulder. The body whorl has eight keels, the two at the periphery the strongest, the last, which is nodulous, encloses the umbilical area. The keels and interstices are crossed by numerous fine axial riblets, about 25 to 30 on a half turn of the body whorl. These riblets corrugate the keels, but do not form nodules. The outer lip is rather thin and expanded. The columella is smooth — not toothed — reflexed, so as to hide the small umbilicus from a front view.

== Distribution ==
This marine species is endemic to Australia and occurs off South Australia, Tasmania, Victoria and Western Australia.
