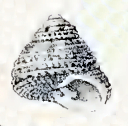
- Drawing of a shell of Clanculus bronni

Scientific classification
- Kingdom: Animalia
- Phylum: Mollusca
- Class: Gastropoda
- Subclass: Vetigastropoda
- Order: Trochida
- Superfamily: Trochoidea
- Family: Trochidae
- Genus: Clanculus
- Species: C. bronni

Binomial name
- Clanculus bronni (Dunker, 1860)

Synonyms
- Clanculus granosus Brazier, 1877; Clanculus hizenensis Pilsbry, 1901; Clanculus (Eucheliclanculus) bronni (Dunker, 1860); Euchelus bronni (Dunker, 1860); Monodonta (Euchelus) bronni Dunker, 1860

= Clanculus bronni =

Species of gastropod

Clanculus bronni is a species of sea snail, a marine gastropod mollusk in the family Trochidae, the top snails.

== Description ==
The size of the shell varies between 5 mm and 7 mm. The perforate shell has a globose-conoid shape. It is brownish and white variegated. The six whorls are convex, the last subangulate toward the base. The base of the shell is planoconvex. The narrow umbilicus crenated. The aperture is subrotund. The lip is costate within. The oblique columella terminates in a thick tooth.

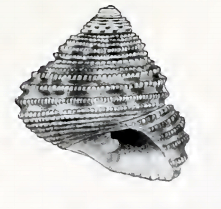
Clanculus bronni ssp. fraterculus

The subspecies Clanculus bronni ssp. fraterculus H. A. Pilsbry, 1904 (synonym: Clanculus hizenensis fraterculus Pilsbry, 1904 - original combination) is described by Pilsbry as trochiform with a flattened base. The ground color is nearly white, radially maculated with brown on the upper surface and smaller spots interposed between the others at the peripheral region. The base has paler small spots on the ribs, sometimes partially arranged in radial stripes. The 5½ or 6 whorls are convex and parted by a narrow, deep suture. The apical 1½ whorls are uniform, the next whorls irregularly dotted with pink on a pale buff-brown ground.

== Distribution ==
This marine species occurs in the Indo-Pacific and off Japan, Singapore, Malaysia, Thailand and Australia (Northern Territory, Queensland)
