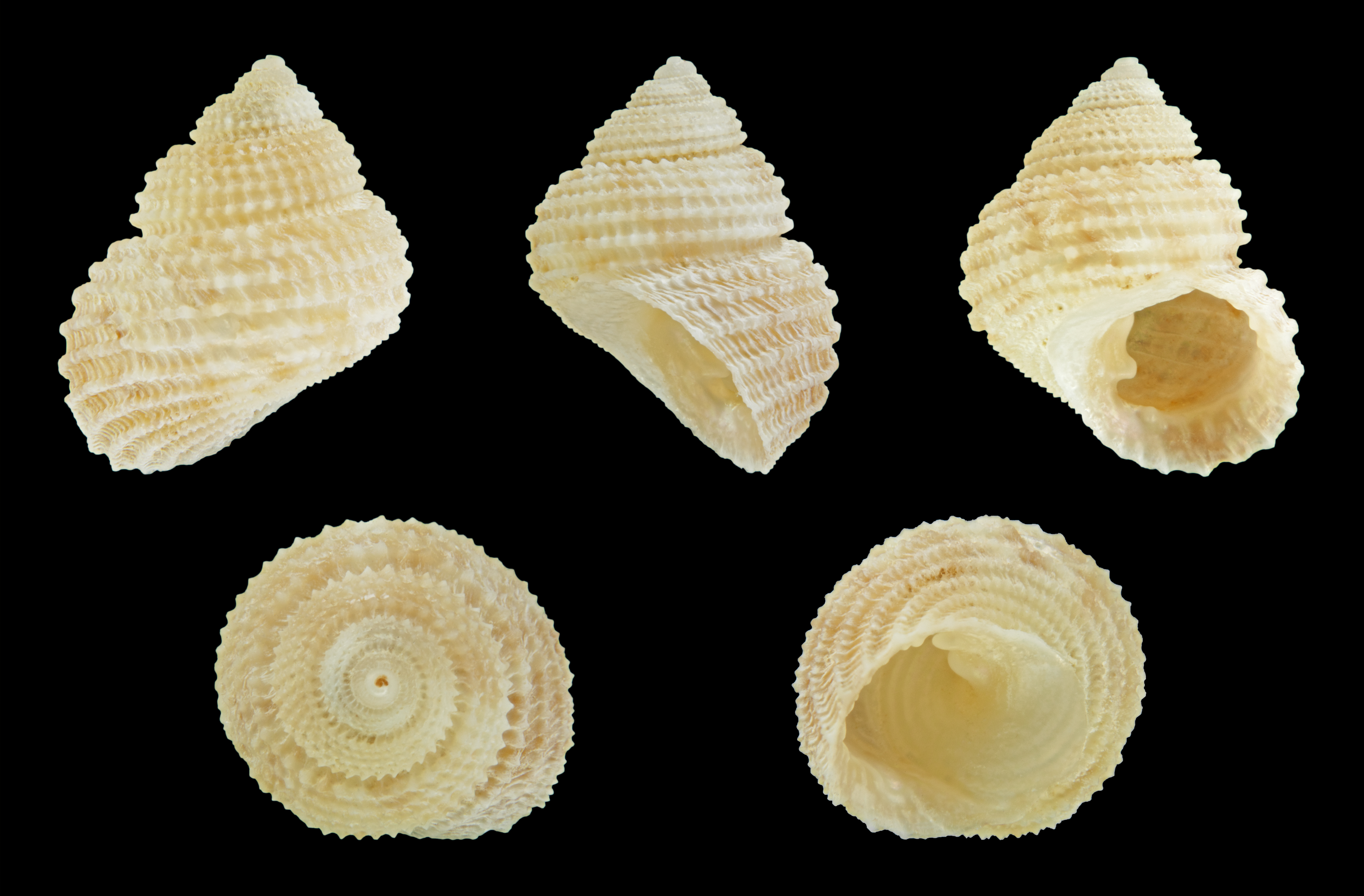

Scientific classification
- Kingdom: Animalia
- Phylum: Mollusca
- Class: Gastropoda
- Subclass: Vetigastropoda
- Family: Chilodontaidae
- Genus: Danilia
- Species: D. eucheliformis

Binomial name
- Danilia eucheliformis (Nomura & Hatai, 1940)

Synonyms
- Euchelus midwayensis Habe & Kosuge, 1970; Monodonta eucheliformis Nomura & Hatai, 1940 (original combination)

= Danilia eucheliformis =

Species of gastropod

Danilia eucheliformis is a species of sea snail, a marine gastropod mollusc in the family Chilodontaidae.

== Description ==
The height of the shell attains 10 mm.

== Distribution ==
THis species occurs in the Western Pacific off Midway Island.
