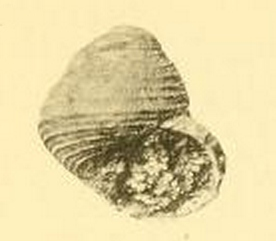
- Drawing with an apertural view of a shell of Danilia otaviana

Scientific classification
- Kingdom: Animalia
- Phylum: Mollusca
- Class: Gastropoda
- Subclass: Vetigastropoda
- Family: Chilodontaidae
- Genus: Danilia
- Species: †D. otaviana

Binomial name
- †Danilia otaviana (Cantraine, 1835)

Synonyms
- Danilia octaviana (Cantraine, F.J., 1835) (misspelling); Olivia otaviana Cantraine, 1835 (original combination); Ziziphinus profugus Gregorio, A. de, 1889 (juvenile)

= Danilia otaviana =

Extinct species of gastropod

Danilia otaviana is an extinct species of sea snail, a marine gastropod mollusc in the family Chilodontaidae.

This species was described by Cantraine after a fossil shell he had found in Messina, Italy.

== Description ==
The length of the shell varies between 7 mm and 15 mm. The shell has a globular shape. Its sculpture is fine and tight.

== Distribution ==
This fossil species is found in the Mediterranean Sea; in the Atlantic Ocean off Northern Spain, Madeira and the Cape Verdes.
