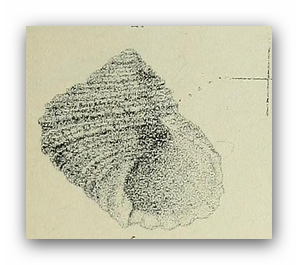
- Drawing of a shell of Tallorbis roseola

Scientific classification
- Kingdom: Animalia
- Phylum: Mollusca
- Class: Gastropoda
- Subclass: Vetigastropoda
- Superfamily: Seguenzioidea
- Family: Chilodontaidae
- Genus: Tallorbis
- Species: T. roseola

Binomial name
- Tallorbis roseola G. Nevill & H. Nevill, 1869

Synonyms
- Euchelus (Tallorbis) roseola (G. Nevill & H. Nevill, 1869); Euchelus lamberti (Souverbie in Souverbie & Montrouzier, 1875); Trochus (Euchelus) lamberti Souverbie, 1875; Trochus (Tallorbis) roseola (G. Nevill & H. Nevill, 1869) superseded combination; Trochus lamberti Souverbie, 1875d; Trochus roseolus (G. Nevill & H. Nevill, 1869) superseded combination; Vaceuchelus roseolus (G. Nevill & H. Nevill, 1869)

= Tallorbis roseola =

Species of gastropod

Tallorbis roseola is a species of sea snail, a marine gastropod mollusk in the family Trochidae, the top snails.

== Description ==
The height of the shell attains 11.5 mm, its diameter 11 mm. The shell has a depressed-conical shape. The 5 whorls are rapidly widening, and are separated by profound sutures. The whorls are spirally distantly costulate, with three costulae on the penultimate whorl, separated, elegantly ornamented with numerous rosy tubercles. The interstices are wide, divided by a central spiral thread, transversely cancellated. The convex base of the shell is similarly ornamented. The ample aperture is subrotund, pearly, smooth inside in adult specimens, in young ones sulcate. The thin lip is scarcely thickened and is crenulate at the margin. The columella is thickened anteriorly, subreflexed, with three twisted plicae.

== Distribution ==
This marine species was originally found off southern Sri Lanka and described as very rare.
