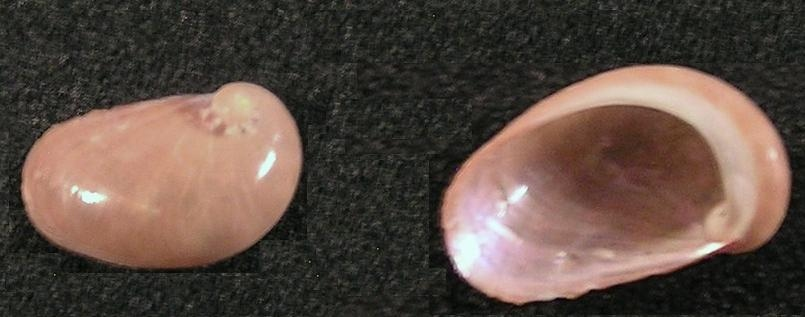
- Two views of a shell of Stomatella galegnoi

Scientific classification
- Kingdom: Animalia
- Phylum: Mollusca
- Class: Gastropoda
- Subclass: Vetigastropoda
- Order: Trochida
- Superfamily: Trochoidea
- Family: Trochidae
- Genus: Stomatella; Lamarck, 1816

Type species
- Stomatella auricula Lamarck, 1816

Synonyms
- Gena Gray, 1842; Phymotis Rafinesque, 1815; Plocamotis P. Fischer, 1885; Stomatella (Gena) Gray, 1842; Stomatella (Stomatella) Lamarck, 1816

= Stomatella =

Genus of sea snails

Stomatella is a genus of small to medium-sized sea snails, marine gastropod mollusks in the family Trochidae, the top snails and their allies.

Lamarck in the Philos. Zool., 1809, mentioned the genus as "Stomatelle" but did not describe the genus, nor did he cite any species. He cited the genus in Anim. s. Vert. vol. vi, p. 209, 1819. with as first species Stomatella imbricata (now a synonym of Granata imbricata (Lamarck, 1816) )

According to the Nomenclator Zoologicus of ubio.org, the authorship should be attributed to Rafinesque., who Latinized the name to Stomatella.

== Description ==
The spiral, orbicularly depressed shell is imperforate. The conical spire is elevated but short. The whorls are rounded but not plicate below the sutures. The last whorl forms the greater part of the shell. The variegated surface is spirally ribbed. The large aperture is wider than the long, nacreous interior. The horny operculum is circular and multispiral.

The foot is truncated posteriorly. There are no epipodial tentacles.

== Species ==
Species within the genus Stomatella include:

- Stomatella auricula Lamarck, 1816
- Stomatella caledonica (Crosse, 1871)
- Stomatella callosa (P. Fischer, 1871)
- Stomatella capieri Poppe, Tagaro & Dekker, 2006
- Stomatella duplicata (G. B. Sowerby I, 1823)
- Stomatella elegans Gray, 1847
- Stomatella esperanzae Rehder, 1980
- Stomatella gattegnoi Poppe, Tagaro & Dekker, 2006
- Stomatella haliotiformis Kuroda & Habe, 1961
- Stomatella illusa Iredale, 1940
- Stomatella impertusa (Burrow, 1815)
- † Stomatella incola (Cotton, 1947)
- Stomatella lintricula (A. Adams, 1850)
- Stomatella modesta H. Adams & A. Adams, 1864
- Stomatella monteiroi Poppe, Tagaro & Dekker, 2006
- Stomatella oliveri (Iredale, 1912)
- Stomatella ornata (A. Adams, 1850)
- Stomatella pallida (A. Adams, 1850)
- Stomatella planulata (Lamarck, 1816)
- Stomatella plumbea (A. Adams, 1850)
- Stomatella striatula (A. Adams, 1850)
- Stomatella terminalis (Verco, 1905)
- Stomatella ungula (Hedley, 1907)

Taxa inquirenda

- Stomatella candida (A. Adams, 1850)
- Stomatella costellata A. Adams, 1850
- Stomatella crassa Montrouzier in Souverbie & Montrouzier, 1870
- Stomatella dilecta G. B. Sowerby II, 1874 (use in recent literature currently undocumented)
- Stomatella elata H. Adams & A. Adams, 1864
- Stomatella laevis (Pease, 1868)
- Stomatella nigra Anton, 1838 (nomen dubium, invalid; not Quoy & Gaimard, 1834)
- Stomatella rosacea (Pease, 1868)
- Stomatella sulcata Lamarck, 1816
- Stomatella ziczac (Preston, 1905)

Species brought into synonymy

- Stomatella (Synaptocochlea) Pilsbry, 1890: synonym of Synaptocochlea Pilsbry, 1890
- Stomatella (Synaptocochlea) crassa Montrouzier in Souverbie & Montrouzier, 1870: synonym of Stomatella crassa Montrouzier in Souverbie & Montrouzier, 1870
- Stomatella arabica A. Adams, 1854: synonym of Stomatolina arabica (A. Adams, 1854) (original combination)
- Stomatella articulata A. Adams, 1850: synonym of Granata sulcifera (Lamarck, 1822)
- Stomatella asperulata (A. Adams, 1850): synonym of Synaptocochlea asperulata (A. Adams, 1850) (superseded combination)
- Stomatella auriculata: synonym of Stomatella auricula Lamarck, 1816
- Stomatella baconi A. Adams, 1850: synonym of Pseudostomatella baconi (A. Adams, 1854)
- Stomatella bicarinata A. Adams, 1854: synonym of Notogibbula bicarinata (A. Adams, 1854) (original combination)
- Stomatella biporcata A. Adams, 1850: synonym of Gibbula multicolor (F. Krauss, 1848)
- Stomatella caliginosa H. Adams & A. Adams, 1864: synonym of Synaptocochlea caliginosa (H. Adams & A. Adams, 1864) (original combination)
- Stomatella calliostoma A. Adams, 1850: synonym of Stomatolina calliostoma (A. Adams, 1850)
- Stomatella cancellata Krauss, 1848: synonym of Hybochelus cancellatus (Krauss, 1848)
- Stomatella clathratula A. Adams in H. & A. Adams, 1854: synonym of Pseudostomatella clathratula (A. Adams, 1854)
- Stomatella coccinea A. Adams, 1850: synonym of Pseudostomatella coccinea (A. Adams, 1850)
- Stomatella compta A. Adams, 1855: synonym of Stomatolina compta (A. Adams, 1855) (original combination)
- Stomatella concinna Gould, 1845: synonym of Synaptocochlea concinna (Gould, 1845)
- Stomatella crenulata Preston, 1908: synonym of Stomatolina crenulata (Preston, 1908) (original combination)
- Stomatella cumingii A. Adams, 1854: synonym of Granata cumingii (A. Adams, 1854)
- Stomatella decolorata Gould, 1848: synonym of Pseudostomatella decolorata (Gould, 1848)
- Stomatella decorata A. Adams, 1854: synonym of Pseudostomatella decorata (A. Adams, 1855) (nomen nudum)
- Stomatella delicata H. Adams & A. Adams, 1864: synonym of Pseudostomatella erythrocoma (Dall, 1889)
- Stomatella doriae Issel, 1869: synonym of Stomatella modesta H. Adams & A. Adams, 1864
- Stomatella exquisita G. B. Sowerby III, 1903: synonym of Stomatolina exquisita (G. B. Sowerby III, 1903) (original combination)
- Stomatella fulgurans A. Adams, 1850: synonym of Stomatolina fulgurans (A. Adams, 1850) (original combination)
- Stomatella godeffroyi: synonym of Stomatolina mariei (Crosse, 1871) (unpublished name)
- Stomatella granosa Lambert, 1874: synonym of Synaptocochlea granosa (Lambert, 1874) (original combination)
- Stomatella haliotoidea A. Adams, 1854: synonym of Stomatella sulcifera Lamarck, 1822: synonym of Granata sulcifera (Lamarck, 1822)
- Stomatella imbricata Lamarck, 1816: synonym of Granata imbricata (Lamarck, 1816)
- Stomatella inflata: synonym of Lamellaria inflata (C.B. Adams, 1852)
- Stomatella irisata Dufo, 1840: synonym of Stomatolina irisata (Dufo, 1840)
- Stomatella japonica A. Adams, 1850: synonym of Granata japonica (A. Adams, 1850) (original combination)
- Stomatella lamellaria Risso: synonym of Lamellaria latens (Müller O.F., 1776)
- Stomatella maculata Quoy & Gaimard, 1834: synonym of Granata maculata (Quoy & Gaimard, 1834)
- Stomatella malukana A. Adams, 1850: synonym of Stomatolina malukana (A. Adams, 1850) (original combination)
- Stomatella margaritana A. Adams, 1850: synonym of Gibbula zonata (W. Wood, 1828)
- Stomatella mariei Crosse, H. 1871: synonym of Stomatolina mariei (Crosse, 1871)
- Stomatella marmorata (Pallary, 1926): synonym of Stomatella callosa (P. Fischer, 1871)
- Stomatella minima Dufo, 1840: synonym of Gena varia A. Adams, 1850: synonym of Stomatella auricula Lamarck, 1816
- Stomatella monilifera A. Adams, 1850: synonym of Pseudostomatella monilifera (A. Adams, 1850) (original combination)
- Stomatella montrouzieri Pilsbry, 1890: synonym of Synaptocochlea montrouzieri (Pilsbry, 1890)
- Stomatella nebulosa (A. Adams, 1850): synonym of Synaptocochlea concinna (Gould, 1845) (superseded combination)
- Stomatella nigra Quoy & Gaimard, 1834: synonym of Stomatella auricula Lamarck, 1816
- Stomatella orbiculata A. Adams, 1850: synonym of Pseudostomatella orbiculata (A. Adams, 1850)
- Stomatella ornata Brazier, 1877: synonym of Stomatella stellata Souverbie, 1863
- Stomatella papyracea (Gmelin, 1791): synonym of Pseudostomatella papyracea (Gmelin, 1791)
- Stomatella picta Montrouzier in Souverbie & Montrouzier, 1862: synonym of Synaptocochlea picta (Montrouzier in Souverbie & Montrouzier, 1862)
- Stomatella rubra Lamarck, 1822: synonym if Stomatolina rubra (Lamarck, 1822)
- Stomatella rufescens Gray, 1847: synonym of Stomatolina rufescens (Gray, 1847)
- Stomatella sanguinea A. Adams, 1850: synonym of Stomatolina sanguinea (A. Adams, 1850)
- Stomatella scitula H. Adams, 1872: synonym of Stomatella modesta H. Adams & A. Adams, 1864
- Stomatella selecta A. Adams, 1855: synonym of Pseudostomatella selecta (A. Adams, 1855) (original combination)
- Stomatella speciosa A. Adams, 1850: synonym of Stomatolina speciosa (A. Adams, 1850) (original combination)
- Stomatella splendidula A. Adams, 1854: synonym of Pseudostomatella splendidula (A. Adams, 1854) (original combination)
- Stomatella stellata Souverbie, 1863: synonym of Synaptocochlea stellata (Souverbie, 1863) (original combination)
- Stomatella sulcifera Lamarck, 1822: synonym of Granata sulcifera (Lamarck, 1822)
- Stomatella tigrina A. Adams, 1850: synonym of Stomatolina tigrina (A. Adams, 1850) (original combination)
- Stomatella tumida Gould: synonym of Pseudostomatella papyracea (Gmelin, 1791)
- Stomatella varia (A. Adams, 1850): synonym of Stomatella auricula Lamarck, 1816 (dubious synonym)
