= Stomatia =

Scientific classification
- Kingdom: Animalia
- Phylum: Mollusca
- Class: Gastropoda
- Subclass: Vetigastropoda
- Order: Trochida
- Superfamily: Trochoidea
- Family: Trochidae
- Genus: Stomatia; Helbling, 1779

Type species
- Stomatia phymotis Helbling, G.S., 1779

Synonyms
- Stomatia (Stomatia) Helbling, 1779; Stomax Montfort, 1810

Genus of gastropods

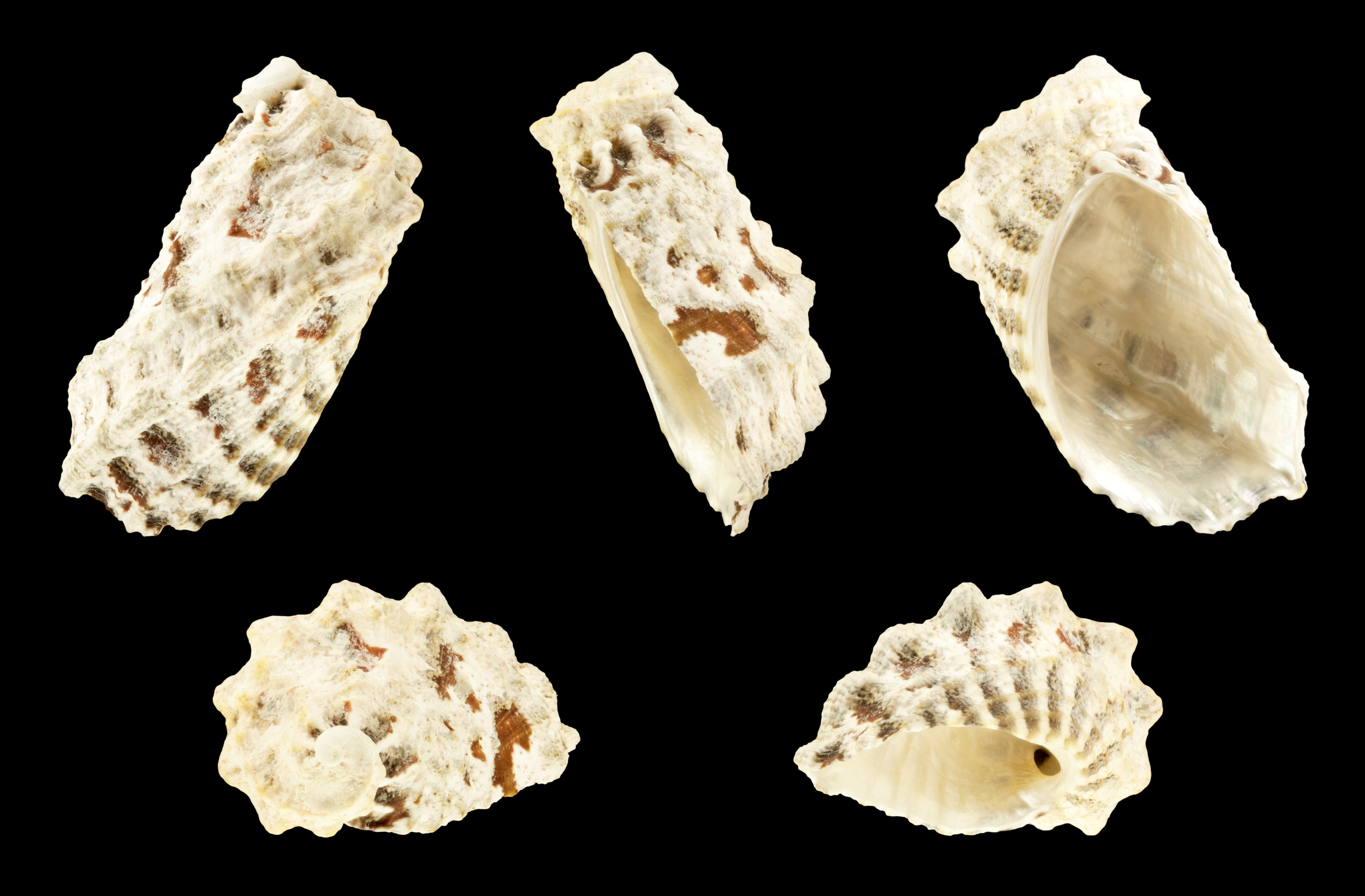

Stomatia, common name the keeled wide mouths, is a genus of sea snails, marine gastropod mollusks in the family Trochidae, the top snails.

== Description ==
The spiral shell is oblong or depressed orbicular. The spire is prominent but short. The surface is tubercled or keeled. The whorls show a series of short folds below the suture. The aperture is either oblong or transversely oval, and longer than wide or the reverse. The interior of the shell is nacreous. There is no operculum.

Stomatia is closely allied to Stomatella, differing in the generally more elongated shell with a series of short folds or puckers below the sutures. Usually the body whorl has a tuberculous carina.

The animal is too large to entirely enter the shell. The foot is large, fleshy, tubercular, greatly produced posteriorly. The epipodium is fringed, with a more prominent fimbriated lobe behind the left tentacle, and on the right there is a slightly projecting fold or gutter leading to the respiratory cavity. There are digitated intertentacular lobes.

== Distribution ==
This marine genus occurs in tropical Indo-West Pacific, Oceania, Korea and Australia.

== Species ==
Species within the genus Stomatia include:

- Stomatia decussata A. Adams, 1850
- Stomatia phymotis (Hebling, 1779)
- Stomatia splendidula A. Adams, 1855

The Indo-Pacific Molluscan Database also mentions the following species

- Stomatia acuminata A. Adams, 1850
- Stomatia sulcata (Lamarck, 1816) (synonyms: Stomatolina rubra (Lamarck, 1822), Stomatella sulcata Lamarck, 1816 and Stomatia sculpturata Preston, 1914)

Species brought into synonymy

- Stomatia angulata A. Adams, 1850: synonym of Stomatolina angulata (A. Adams, 1850)
- Stomatia australis A. Adams, 1850: synonym of Stomatia phymotis Helbling, 1779
- Stomatia azonea Brusina, 1865: synonym of Megalomphalus azoneus (Brusina, 1865)
- Stomatia depressa Sowerby, 1874: synonym of Stomatolina sanguinea (A. Adams, 1850)
- Stomatia duplicata G.B. Sowerby I, 1823: synonym of Stomatella duplicata (G. B. Sowerby I, 1823)
- Stomatia kutschigi Brusina, 1865: synonym of Fossarus ambiguus (Linnaeus, 1758)
- Stomatia obscurata Lamarck, 1822: synonym of Stomatia phymotis Helbling, 1779
- Stomatia picta d'Orbigny, 1847: synonym of Synaptocochlea picta (d'Orbigny, 1847)
- Stomatia planulata Schepman, 1908: synonym of Microtis tuberculata A. Adams, 1850
- Stomatia (Microtis) heckeliana Crosse, 1871: synonym of Microtis tuberculata A. Adams, 1850
- Stomatia (Miraconcha) obscura Sowerby, G.B. III, 1874: synonym of Stomatia phymotis (Hebling, 1779)
