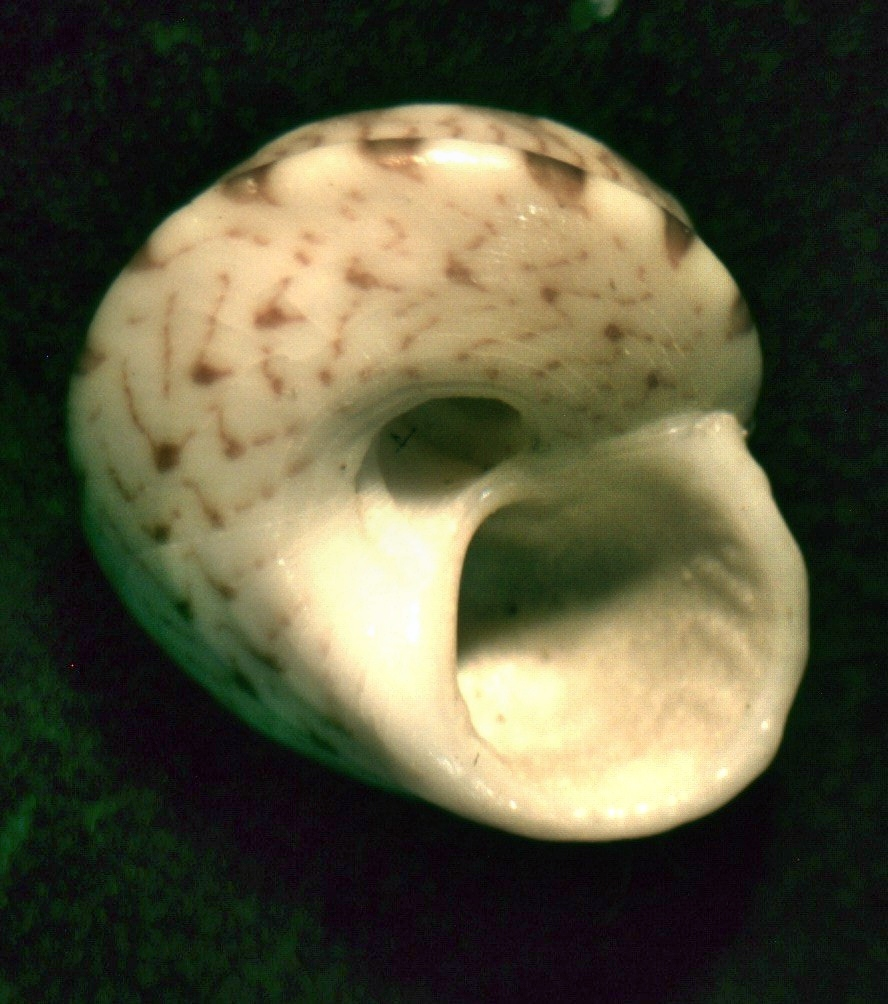
- Notogibbula bicarinata

Scientific classification
- Kingdom: Animalia
- Phylum: Mollusca
- Class: Gastropoda
- Subclass: Vetigastropoda
- Order: Trochida
- Family: Trochidae
- Genus: Notogibbula; Iredale, 1924

Type species
- Gibbula coxi Angas, 1867

Synonyms
- Gibbula (Notogibbula) Iredale, 1924 superseded rank

= Notogibbula =

Genus of gastropods

Notogibbula is a genus of sea snail, marine gastropod molluscs of the family Trochidae, the top shells.

== Distribution ==
This marine genus is found off the coast of Australia (New South Wales, Queensland, South Australia, Tasmania, Victoria and Western Australia). It also occurs in the Persian Gulf and in the Indian Ocean off Tanzania.

== Species ==
According to the Indo-Pacific Molluscan Database, the following species with names in current use are included within the genus Notogibbula :

- † Notogibbula aequisulcata (Tenison Woods, 1877)
- Notogibbula bicarinata (Adams, 1854)
- † Notogibbula clarkei (Tenison Woods, 1877)
- Notogibbula lehmanni (Menke, 1843)
- Notogibbula preissiana (Philippi, 1849)

Species brought into synonymy

- Notogibbula coxi (Angas, 1867): synonym of Notogibbula bicarinata (A. Adams, 1854) (junior subjective synonym)
- Notogibbula maccullochi (Hedley, 1907): synonym of Eurytrochus maccullochi (Hedley, 1907)
- Notogibbula townsendi (Sowerby III, 1895): synonym of Agagus agagus Jousseaume, F.P., 1894

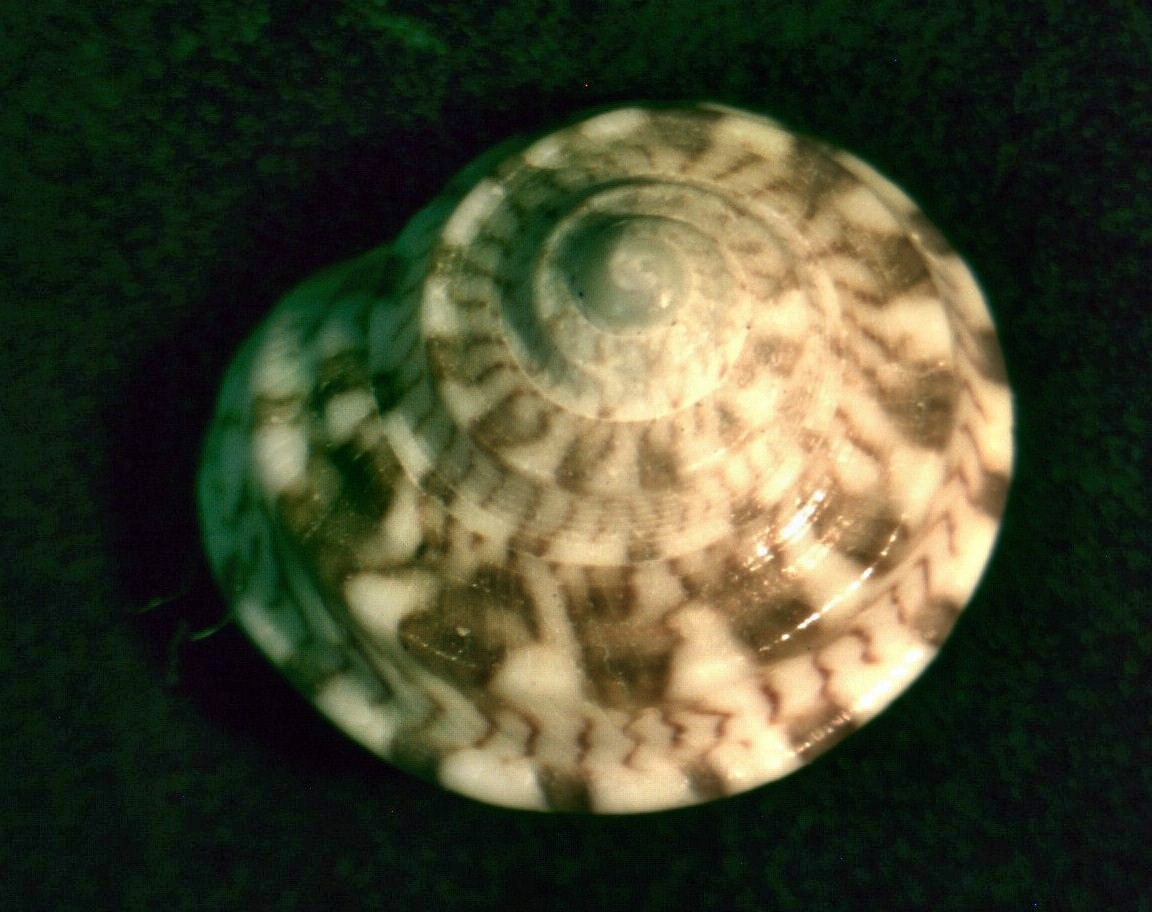
Notogibbula bicarinata, apical view
