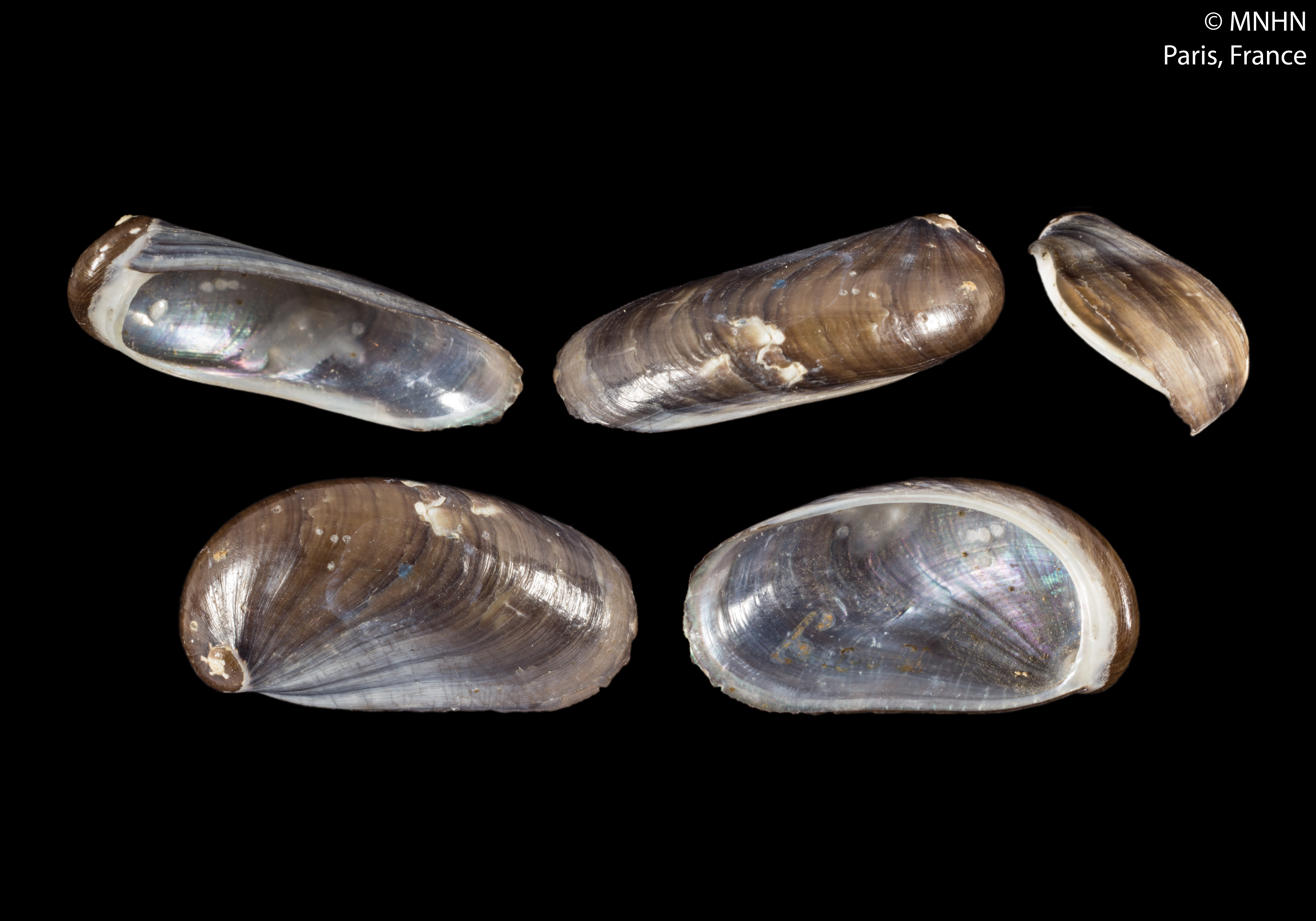
- shell of Stomatella auricula (syntype at MNHN, Paris)
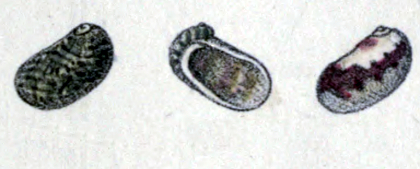
- Drawing with three views of a shell of Stomatella varia

Scientific classification
- Kingdom: Animalia
- Phylum: Mollusca
- Class: Gastropoda
- Subclass: Vetigastropoda
- Order: Trochida
- Superfamily: Trochoidea
- Family: Trochidae
- Genus: Stomatella
- Species: S. auricula

Binomial name
- Stomatella auricula Lamarck, 1816

Synonyms
- Gena auricula Lamarck, 1816; Gena lutea auctt, non Patella lutea Linnaeus, 1758; Gena nigra (Quoy & Gaimard, 1834) (superseded combination); Gena strigosa A. Adams, 1850; Gena varia A. Adams, 1850; Stomatella auriculata (misspelling); Stomatella minima Dufo, 1840; Stomatella nigra Quoy & Gaimard, 1834; Stomatella varia (A. Adams, 1850) (dubious synonym)

= Stomatella auricula =

Species of gastropod

Stomatella auricula, common name the false ear shell, is a species of sea snail, a marine gastropod mollusk in the family Trochidae, the top snails.

== Description ==
The size of the shell varies between 5 mm and 20 mm. The shell has an elongated, rather narrow Haliotis-shape. It is smooth, polished, except for the growth lines near the lip. The body whorl is not spirally striate. Its color is golden, finely reticulated with light golden-brown, and showing several broad and narrow spiral crimson bands. The coloration is variable within wide limits. The color varies from carmine to white and even blackish, with more or less numerous white spots and often darker, articulated, spiral bands. The upper whorls are commonly of another colour than the body whorl. The outline is long and the polished surface show s no spiral striae except on the penultimate and beginning of the body whorl, where fine, scarcely impressed, close spiral lines can be seen under a strong lens. A few separated impressed striae extend along the columellar margin of the base. The columellar margin is slightly bowed or concave. The upper surface has subregular radiating striae. The ground color consists of a fine zigzagged mottling of whitish and light brown, through which the underlying nacre shines with a golden iridescence. There are several narrow spiral lines articulated remotely with white dots. And on the latter part of the whorl these are replaced by bands or lines of crimson. The aperture is oblong. Its posterior angle is filled by a pearly callus. The outer lip is sinuous. The lip margin is not bowed, but in one plane. There is a slightly projecting angle where the columella joins the basal lip. So that when lying on its face the peristome is in contact with a plane surface all the way around except the median part of the columellar lip.

(Description as Stomatella varia) The size of the shell varies between 6 mm and 17 mm. The polished shell is ear-shaped with an ovate-oblong form. The back is equally convex. The left side is striated. Its color is buff, varied with white and red. The spire is rather prominent, erect and acuminate.

This is a pretty little species, usually confounded with Stomatella impertusa, but easily distinguished when its profile is examined. The dorsum is equally convex and polished, and the spire is rather prominent, erect and acuminated.

== Distribution ==
This species occurs in the Red Sea and in the Central and East Indian Ocean off Mozambique, Aldabra and Chagos; in the Western Pacific; in the South Pacific off Tonga;and off Japan, the Philippines, Polynesia and Queensland, Australia.
