= P. rubra =

P. rubra may refer to:

- Paradisaea rubra, the red bird-of-paradise or Cendrawasih Merah, a bird species
- Piranga rubra, the summer tanager, a medium-sized American songbird species
- Plumeria rubra, the red frangipani or common frangipani, a deciduous tree species
- Pseudostomatella rubra, a sea snail species
