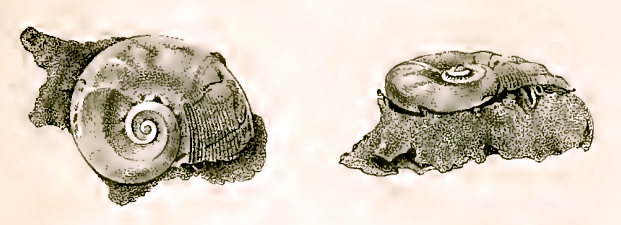
- Drawing with two views of the animal and shell of Microtis tuberculata

Scientific classification
- Kingdom: Animalia
- Phylum: Mollusca
- Class: Gastropoda
- Subclass: Vetigastropoda
- Order: Trochida
- Superfamily: Trochoidea
- Family: Trochidae
- Genus: Microtis; H. Adams & A. Adams, 1850

Type species
- Microtis tuberculata Adams, A., 1850

Synonyms
- Stomatia (Microtis) H. Adams & A. Adams, 1850

= Microtis (gastropod) =

Genus of gastropods

Microtis is a genus of sea snails, marine gastropod mollusks in the family Trochidae, the top snails.

== Description ==
The spiral shell is suborbicular and depressed. It has two tuberculated ridges. The spire is slightly projecting. The aperture is very large, and wider than long. Its interior is pearly within. The columellar margin is spiral and visible as far as the apex of the spire. There is no operculum.

== Species ==
Species within the genus Microtis (gastropod) include:

- Microtis tuberculata A. Adams, 1850

The following species were brought into synonymy:

- Microtis heckeliana (Crosse, 1871): synonym of Microtis tuberculata A. Adams, 1850
- Microtis rubra (Deshayes, 1843): synonym of Stomatolina rubra (Lamarck, J.B.P.A. de, 1822)

== Distribution ==
This marine genus occurs off Northern Australia and in the South Pacific Ocean
