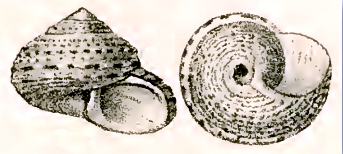
- Original drawing with two views of a shell of Eurytrochus concinnus

Scientific classification
- Kingdom: Animalia
- Phylum: Mollusca
- Class: Gastropoda
- Subclass: Vetigastropoda
- Order: Trochida
- Superfamily: Trochoidea
- Family: Trochidae
- Genus: Eurytrochus
- Species: E. concinnus

Binomial name
- Eurytrochus concinnus (Pilsbry, 1890)

Synonyms
- Gibbula concinna Pilsbry, 1890

= Eurytrochus concinnus =

Species of gastropod

Eurytrochus concinnus is a species of sea snail, a marine gastropod mollusk in the family Trochidae, the top snails.

This species was attributed to Wilhelm Dunker by H.A. Pilsbry, 1890 as Gibbula concinna Dunker (Manual of Conchology vol. 11, p. 230) but apparently it was a manuscript name that was mentioned in several publications (see references) but was not described by Dunker. The accepted name therefore dates from Pilsbry who provided the first description and illustrations.

== Description ==
The size of the shell attains 4 mm, its diameter 4–6 mm. The small, solid shell has a globose-depressed-conical shape. It is narrowly umbilicate. It is lusterless, soiled whitish or yellowish, with either a series of dark flammules below the sutures. The base of the shell is faintly articulated with dark, or else. The entire surface is mottled andnearly covered with blackish. The body whorl is obtusely subangular, and descends a trifle anteriorly. The sutures are narrowly but decidedly impressed. The penultimate whorl has 7 or 8 equal strong spiral lirae, as wide as the interstices, which are densely obliquely striate and have usually a few indistinct spiral striae. The base has about 10 concentric liruase. The rounded aperture is very oblique, thickened with opaque white within. Its edge is crenulated. The narrow umbilicus is bounded by an indistinctly crenulated rib, strongly grooved within.

The upper one or two lirae are more or less beaded, and sometimes all of them are. The interstices are sometimes wider than the lirae, and have numerous quite distinct spiral striae.

== Distribution ==
This marine species occurs in the Pacific Ocean off Samoa and off Queensland, Australia.
