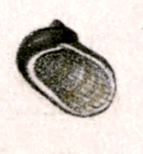
- Drawing of a shell of Synaptocochlea picta

Scientific classification
- Kingdom: Animalia
- Phylum: Mollusca
- Class: Gastropoda
- Subclass: Vetigastropoda
- Order: Trochida
- Family: Trochidae
- Subfamily: Fossarininae
- Genus: Synaptocochlea; Pilsbry, 1890

Type species
- Stomatella montrouzieri Pilsbry, 1890

Synonyms
- Stomatella (Synaptocochlea) Pilsbry, 1890

= Synaptocochlea =

Genus of gastropods

Synaptocochlea is a genus of very small sea snails, marine gastropod mollusks in the family Trochidae, the top snails.

== Description ==
The oval shell is intermediate between Stomatella and Gena in contour. The very short spire is sub-marginal. The surface is spirally striated or decussated. The very large aperture is longer than it is wide. The animal has an operculum.

== Distribution ==
This marine genus occurs in the tropical Indo-West Pacific, Indo-Malaysia, Oceania and off Australia (Northern Territory, Queensland, Western Australia)

== Species ==
Species within the genus Synaptocochlea include:

- Synaptocochlea asperulata (A. Adams, 1850)
- Synaptocochlea belmonti Simone, 2009
- Synaptocochlea caliginosa H. & A. Adams, 1863
- Synaptocochlea concinna (Gould, 1845)
- Synaptocochlea granosa (Lambert, 1874)
- Synaptocochlea montrouzieri (Pilsbry, 1890)
- Synaptocochlea picta (d'Orbigny, 1847)
- Synaptocochlea pulchella (A. Adams, 1850)
- Synaptocochlea stellata (Souverbie, 1863)

The Indo-Pacific Molluscan Database also mentions the following species

- Synaptocochlea hexagonum Philippi, 1850
- Synaptocochlea tursicus Reeve, 1848

Species brought into synonymy

- Synaptocochlea inconcinna auct. non Pilsbry, 1921: synonym of Synaptocochlea picta (d'Orbigny, 1847)
- Synaptocochlea lactea Usticke, 1959: synonym of Synaptocochlea picta (d'Orbigny, 1847)
- Synaptocochlea nigrita Rehder, 1939: synonym of Synaptocochlea picta (d'Orbigny, 1847)
- Synaptocochlea picta (Montrouzier in Souverbie & Montrouzier, 1862): synonym of Synaptocochlea montrouzieri (Pilsbry, 1890)
