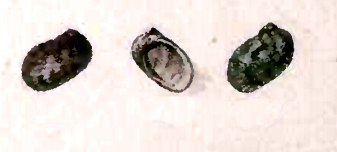
- Drawing with three views of a shell of Synaptocochlea pulchella

Scientific classification
- Kingdom: Animalia
- Phylum: Mollusca
- Class: Gastropoda
- Subclass: Vetigastropoda
- Order: Trochida
- Family: Trochidae
- Subfamily: Fossarininae
- Genus: Synaptocochlea
- Species: S. pulchella

Binomial name
- Synaptocochlea pulchella (A. Adams, 1850)

Synonyms
- Gena pulchella A. Adams, 1850; Stomatella pulchella (A. Adams, 1850)

= Synaptocochlea pulchella =

Species of gastropod

Synaptocochlea pulchella is a species of sea snail, a marine gastropod mollusk in the family Trochidae, the top snails.

== Description ==
The size of the shell attains 2.5 mm. The oval shell is convexly depressed. Its color is white, spotted with red. The back of the shell is convex and all over striated. The spire is rather prominent,. The whorls are rounded. The oval aperture is large. It is pearly and iridescent within.

== Distribution ==
This marine species occurs in the West Pacific.
