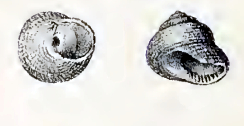
- Drawing showing two views of a shell of E. bathyraphe

Scientific classification
- Kingdom: Animalia
- Phylum: Mollusca
- Class: Gastropoda
- Subclass: Vetigastropoda
- Order: Trochida
- Superfamily: Trochoidea
- Family: Trochidae
- Genus: Eurytrochus
- Species: E. bathyrhaphe

Binomial name
- Eurytrochus bathyrhaphe (E. A. Smith, 1876)

Synonyms
- Clanculus bathyrhaphe (E. A. Smith, 1876); Trochus bathyrhaphe (E.A. Smith, 1862); Trochus (Clanculus) bathyrhaphe E.A. Smith, 1862

= Eurytrochus bathyrhaphe =

Species of gastropod

Eurytrochus bathyrhaphe is a species of sea snail, a marine gastropod mollusk in the family Trochidae, the top snails.

== Description ==
The height of the shell attains 6.5 mm, its diameter is 8.5 mm. The shell has a depressed-conic shape with a flattened base. It is olive-green, the apex green. The shell is ornamented with deep brown granules. It is rather widely umbilicate. The 5½ convex whorls are separated by a narrowly canaliculate suture, and encircled by granose lirae, about 7 on the penultimate whorl . The body whorl has a roundly angulated periphery and is encircled by about 14 granulose lirae. The white umbilicus is surrounded by a white granuliferous rib, with a smooth rib within. The oblique aperture is beautifully pearly, and lirae within. The outer margin of the lip is crenulated, at the base and is strongly lirate. The oblique columella is inserted on the whorl above, and is dentate below.

== Distribution ==
This marine species occurs off the Solomon Islands and the Philippines.
