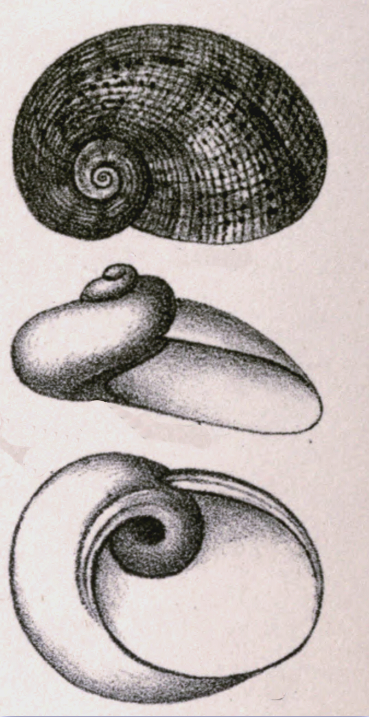
- Drawing with three views of a shell of Stomatella modesta

Scientific classification
- Kingdom: Animalia
- Phylum: Mollusca
- Class: Gastropoda
- Subclass: Vetigastropoda
- Order: Trochida
- Superfamily: Trochoidea
- Family: Trochidae
- Genus: Stomatella
- Species: S. modesta

Binomial name
- Stomatella modesta H. Adams & A. Adams, 1864

Synonyms
- Stomatella doriae Issel, 1869; Stomatella scitula H. Adams, 1872; Stomatolina scitula (H. Adams, 1872)

= Stomatella modesta =

Species of gastropod

Stomatella modesta is a species of sea snail, a marine gastropod mollusk in the family Trochidae, the top snails.

== Description ==
The height of the shell attains 2 3/4 mm, its diameter 4 1/2 mm. The fragile, thin shell has an orbiculate-conoid shape and is much depressed. It is imperforate and is transversely minutely striate-costulate. Its color is whitish painted with irregular chestnut spots. The spire is obtuse and contains four convex whorls, separated by impressed sutures. The first whorl is narrow and slowly increasing. The body whorl is large, rather convex above, and rounded beneath. The large aperture is very oblique and subrotund. The acute peristome is interrupted. The columellar margin is a little reflexed at the insertion. The throat is a little pearly.

== Distribution ==
This marine species occurs in the Red Sea.
