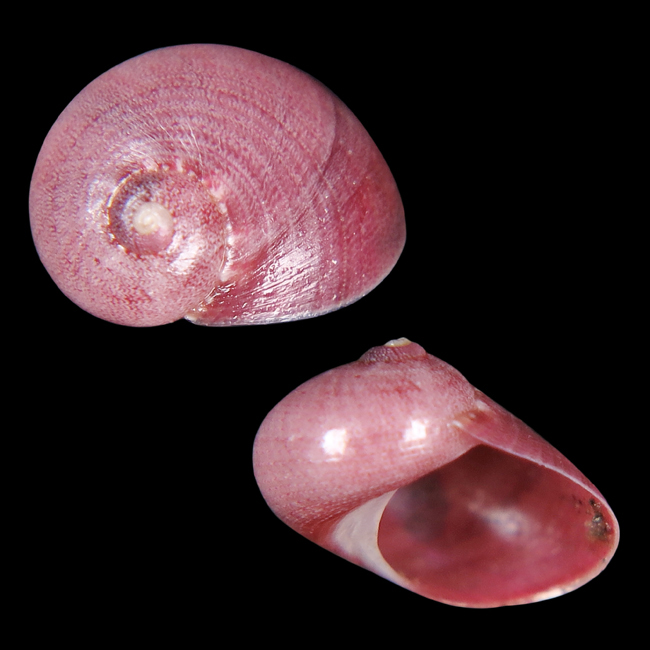

Scientific classification
- Kingdom: Animalia
- Phylum: Mollusca
- Class: Gastropoda
- Subclass: Vetigastropoda
- Order: Trochida
- Superfamily: Trochoidea
- Family: Trochidae
- Genus: Stomatella
- Species: S. capieri

Binomial name
- Stomatella capieri Poppe, Tagaro & Dekker, 2006

= Stomatella capieri =

Species of gastropod

Stomatella capieri is a species of sea snail, a marine gastropod mollusk in the family Trochidae, the top snails.

== Description ==
The size of the shell varies between 2.8 mm and 7 mm. Like other members of its genus, it features an orbicularly depressed, ear-like shell that lacks a full conical whorl structure typical of conventional snails, they also possess a large, muscular foot that extends far past its reduced shell.

== Distribution ==
This marine species occurs off the Philippines at depths between 60 m and 100 m.
