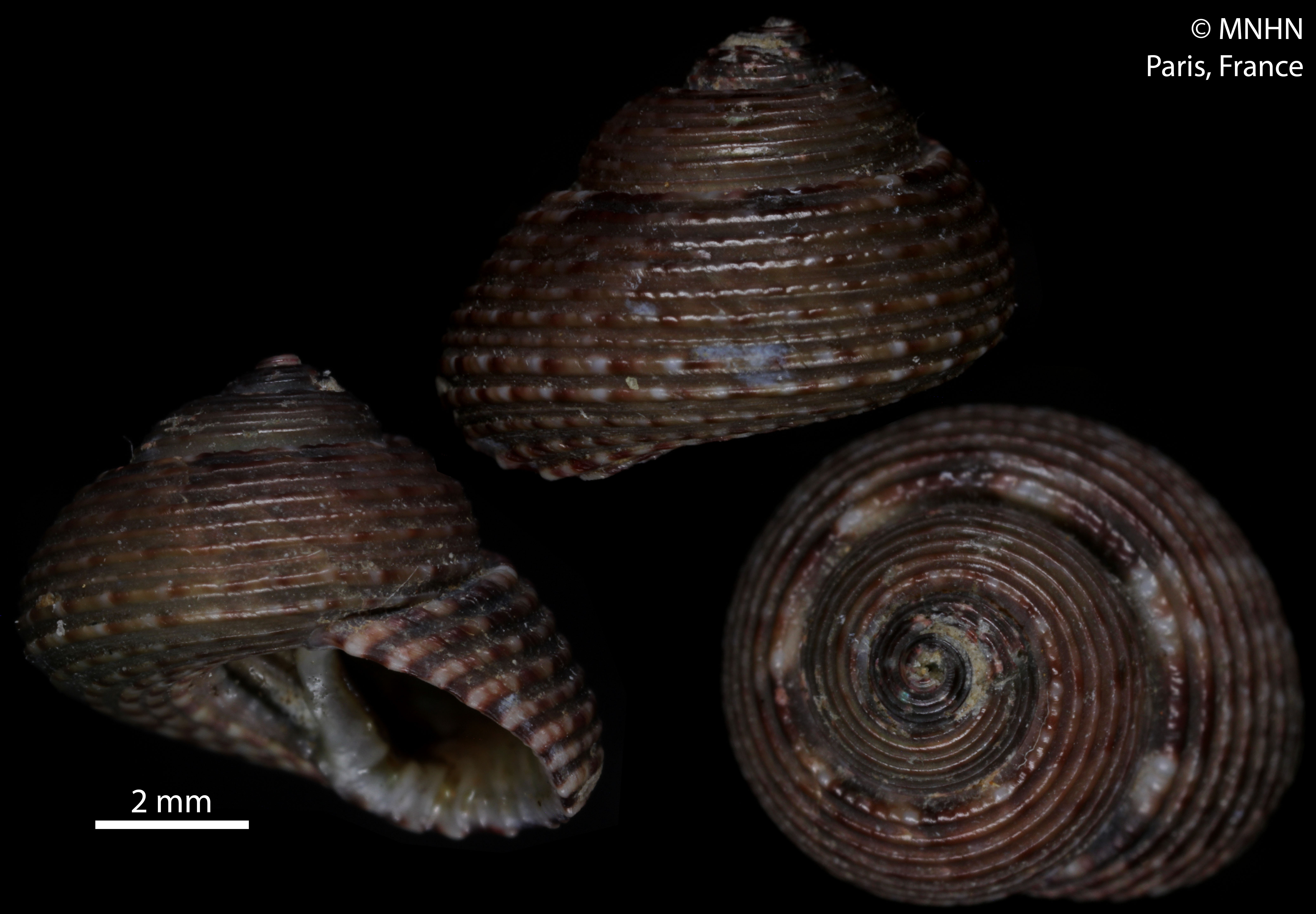
- Shell of Eurytrochus reevei (paralectotype at MNHN, Paris)

Scientific classification
- Kingdom: Animalia
- Phylum: Mollusca
- Class: Gastropoda
- Subclass: Vetigastropoda
- Order: Trochida
- Superfamily: Trochoidea
- Family: Trochidae
- Genus: Eurytrochus; P. Fischer, 1879

Type species
- Clanculus danieli Crosse, H., 1862

Synonyms
- Gibbula (Eurytrochus) Fischer, 1879

= Eurytrochus =

Genus of sea snails

Eurytrochus is a genus of sea snails, marine gastropod mollusks in the subfamily Trochinae of the family Trochidae, the top snails.

== Description ==
The small shell is spirally lirate, depressed, and umbilicate. The body whorl is deflected toward the aperture. The oblique aperture is rounded-quadrangular. The terminations of the lips are approaching, connected by a callus. The outer and basal lips are crenulated within.

== Distribution ==
This marine species occurs in Oceania, Japan, the Philippines and Australia (New South Wales, Queensland, Victoria)

== Species ==
Species within the genus Eurytrochus include:

- Eurytrochus affinis (Garrett, 1872)
- Eurytrochus bathyrhaphe (E. A. Smith, 1876)
- Eurytrochus blanfordianus (G. Nevill, 1869)
- Eurytrochus charopiformis Willan, 2020
- Eurytrochus concinnus (Pilsbry, 1890)
- Eurytrochus danieli (Crosse, 1862)
- Eurytrochus fragarioides Willan, 2020
- Eurytrochus maccullochi (Hedley, C., 1907)
- Eurytrochus reevei Montrouzier, 1866
- Eurytrochus strangei (Adams, A., 1853)

Species brought into synonymy

- Eurytrochus affinis cognatus (Pilsbry, 1903): synonym of Clanculus cognatus (Pilsbry, 1903)
- Eurytrochus dacostana Preston, H.B., 1909: synonym of Eurytrochus strangei (Adams, A., 1853)
- Eurytrochus sticticus (A. Adams, 1854) (uncertain)
