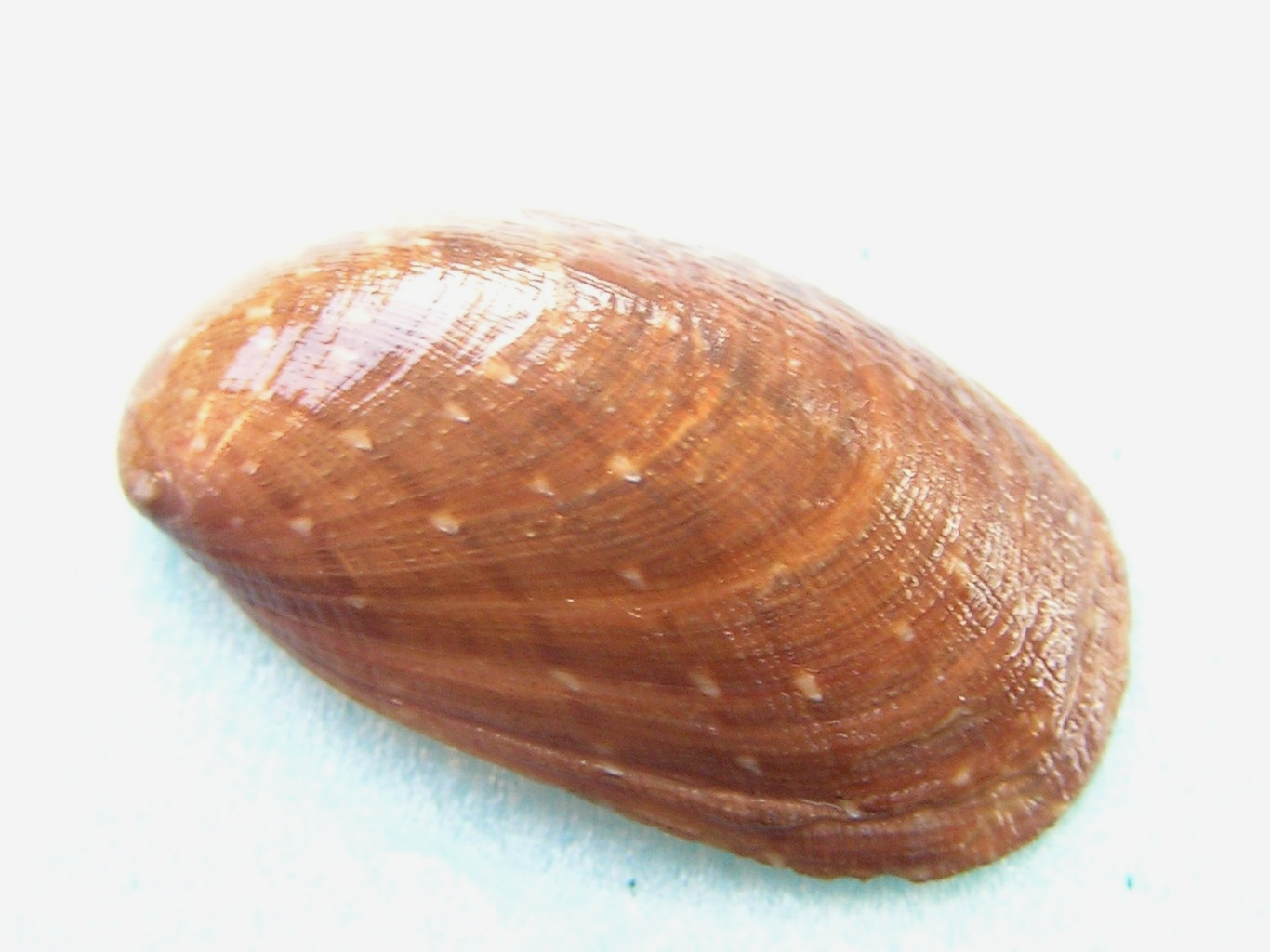
- Apical view of a shell of Stomatella planulata

Scientific classification
- Kingdom: Animalia
- Phylum: Mollusca
- Class: Gastropoda
- Subclass: Vetigastropoda
- Order: Trochida
- Superfamily: Trochoidea
- Family: Trochidae
- Genus: Stomatella
- Species: S. planulata

Binomial name
- Stomatella planulata (Lamarck, 1816)

Synonyms
- Gena planulata Lamarck, 1816

= Stomatella planulata =

Species of gastropod

Stomatella planulata, common name the flattened stomatella, is a species of sea snail, a marine gastropod mollusk in the family Trochidae, the top snails.

== Description ==
The length of the shell varies between 15 mm and 30 mm. The oval shell is much flattened. The spire is very minute, and very near the end. The aperture is almost as long as shell, its margins level and it is not arched.

Oval-oblong in contour, the two sides are about equally curved. The surface is shining, very densely and minutely striate in the direction of the whorls. The color is very deep blackish-olive with white dots, or finely variegated and marbled all over with gray and olive-brown. Under a lens it is finely articulated on the striae. The shell contains three whorls and a minute spire not projecting beyond the general outline of the shell. The oval aperture is very large. The columellar and lip margins are equally curved. The upper end is rounded with a pearly callus filling the angle. The interior is nacreous, with blue-green and fiery-red reflections

== Distribution ==
This species occurs in the Indian Ocean off Tanzania; in the Pacific Ocean off Japan and the Philippines and in the Southwest Pacific.
