= Stomatella oliveri =

Scientific classification
- Kingdom: Animalia
- Phylum: Mollusca
- Class: Gastropoda
- Subclass: Vetigastropoda
- Order: Trochida
- Superfamily: Trochoidea
- Family: Trochidae
- Genus: Stomatella
- Species: S. oliveri

Binomial name
- Stomatella oliveri (Iredale, 1912)

Synonyms
- Gena oliveri Iredale, 1912; Stomatella (Gena) oliveri (iredale, 1912)

Species of gastropod

Stomatella oliveri is a species of sea snail, a marine gastropod mollusk in the family Trochidae, the top snails.

== Distribution ==
This marine species is endemic to New Zealand, off the Kermadec Islands and Raoul Island.
