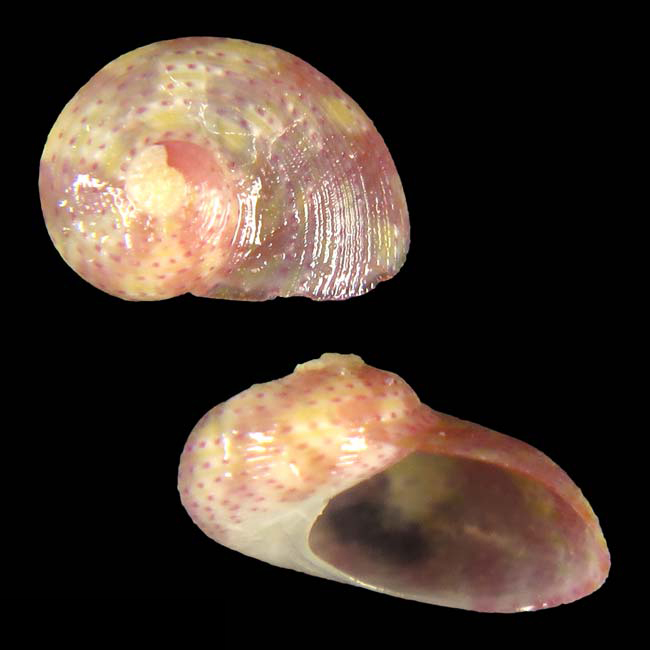

Scientific classification
- Kingdom: Animalia
- Phylum: Mollusca
- Class: Gastropoda
- Subclass: Vetigastropoda
- Order: Trochida
- Superfamily: Trochoidea
- Family: Trochidae
- Genus: Stomatella
- Species: S. monteiroi

Binomial name
- Stomatella monteiroi Poppe, Tagaro & Dekker, 2006

= Stomatella monteiroi =

Species of gastropod

Stomatella monteiroi is a species of sea snail, a marine gastropod mollusk in the family Trochidae, the top snails.

== Description ==
The size of the shell varies between 3.3 mm and 4.5 mm.

== Distribution ==
This marine species occurs off the Philippines.
