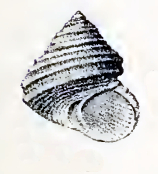
- Drawing of a shell of Eurytrochus strangei

Scientific classification
- Kingdom: Animalia
- Phylum: Mollusca
- Class: Gastropoda
- Subclass: Vetigastropoda
- Order: Trochida
- Superfamily: Trochoidea
- Family: Trochidae
- Genus: Eurytrochus
- Species: E. strangei

Binomial name
- Eurytrochus strangei (A. Adams, 1853)

Synonyms
- Eurytrochus dacostana Preston, H.B., 1909; Gibbula dacostana Preston, 1909; Gibbula (Eurytrochus) strangei (Adams, 1853); Monodonta strangei Adams, 1853 (original description); Trochus strangei Whitelegge, T. 1889; Trochus (Gibbula) strangei Henn, A.U. & Brazier, J.W. 1894

= Eurytrochus strangei =

Species of gastropod

Eurytrochus strangei is a species of sea snail, a marine gastropod mollusk in the family Trochidae, the top snails.

== Description ==
The shell grows to a length of 10 mm, its diameter 8 mm. The small, rather thin, narrowly umbilicate shell has a globose-conical shape. It is lusterless, olive colored, with scattered white dots, and obliquely radiating brown flames below the sutures, the spiral ribs with minute brown dots. The acute spire is conical,. The sutures are subcanaliculate. The five convex whorls are encircled by strong spiral ridges, 3 on the upper, 4 on the body whorl, the fourth forming the periphery. The interstices are spirally striate, below the suture radiately lamellose striate. The base contains numerous concentric lirae. A patch around the umbilicus is white, articulated with brown. The aperture is subquadrangular, iridescent and sulcate within. The straight columella is usually green tinged.

The strong keels of the upper surface separate this form from allied species.

== Distribution ==
This marine species is endemic to Australia and occurs off Queensland, New South Wales and Victoria.
