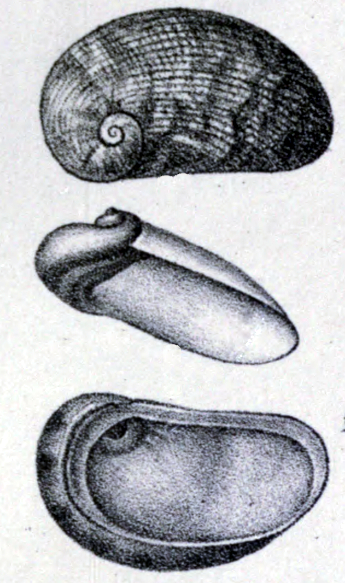
- Drawing with three views of a shell of Stomatella callosa

Scientific classification
- Kingdom: Animalia
- Phylum: Mollusca
- Class: Gastropoda
- Subclass: Vetigastropoda
- Order: Trochida
- Superfamily: Trochoidea
- Family: Trochidae
- Genus: Stomatella
- Species: S. callosa

Binomial name
- Stomatella callosa (P. Fischer, 1871)

Synonyms
- Gena callosa P. Fischer, 1871; Gena marmorata Pallary, 1926 · unaccepted (original combination); Stomatella marmorata (Pallary, 1926) ·

= Stomatella callosa =

Species of gastropod

Stomatella callosa is a species of sea snail, a marine gastropod mollusk in the family Trochidae, the top snails.

== Description ==
The length of the shell attains 11 mm, its diameter 7 mm. The complanate shell is ovate, elongated, transversely delicately striate and contains two whorls. The apex is somewhat prominent. The oblong aperture is ear-shaped. Its right lip is simple, somewhat excavated in the middle. The columella is margined, strong, thickened, callous and provided with a tooth-like tubercle. The margins are continuous and joined by a callus.

== Distribution ==
This species occurs in the Red Sea.
