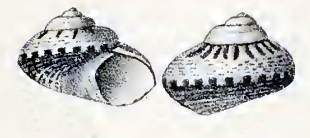
- Drawing showing two views of a shell of Notogibbula lehmanni

Scientific classification
- Kingdom: Animalia
- Phylum: Mollusca
- Class: Gastropoda
- Subclass: Vetigastropoda
- Order: Trochida
- Superfamily: Trochoidea
- Family: Trochidae
- Genus: Notogibbula
- Species: N. lehmanni

Binomial name
- Notogibbula lehmanni (Menke, 1843)

Synonyms
- Gibbula pulchra A. Adams, 1853; Trochus lehmanni Philippi; Trochus rigata Philippi, 1851; Turbo lehmanni Menke, 1843 (original combination)

= Notogibbula lehmanni =

Species of gastropod

Notogibbula lehmanni, common name the many-coloured top shell, is a species of small sea snail, a marine gastropod mollusc in the family Trochidae, the top shells.

The fossil record of this species goes back to the Early Pleistocene.

== Description ==
The size of the shell varies between 6 mm and 9 mm. The umbilicate shell is rather thin and has an orbicular-conoid shape. The six whorls are separated by impressed sutures. The first whorl is eroded, the following are angular, flattened above, gradated, strikingly painted, spirally lirate. The delicate lirae number about 12 on the penultimate whorl. The body whorl is dilated, biangular, ornamented with transverse white and reddish-violet interrupted lines, like flexuous rays. At the suture and periphery, there are zones formed of violet-brown spots alternating with white or yellowish ones. The base of the shell is convex, with 15 to 16 concentric lirae. The coloration is white and reddish tessellated. The aperture subovate and has thin margins. The columella is arcuate, subnodose inside below. The white umbilical tract is funnel-shaped.

== Distribution ==
This marine species is endemic to Australia and occurs off New South Wales, South Australia, Tasmania, Victoria and Western Australia
