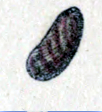
- Drawing of a shell of Stomatella lintricula

Scientific classification
- Kingdom: Animalia
- Phylum: Mollusca
- Class: Gastropoda
- Subclass: Vetigastropoda
- Order: Trochida
- Superfamily: Trochoidea
- Family: Trochidae
- Genus: Stomatella
- Species: S. lintricula

Binomial name
- Stomatella lintricula (A. Adams, 1850)

Synonyms
- Gena lentricula A. Adams, 1850 (misspelling); Gena lintricula A. Adams, 1850 (original combination)

= Stomatella lintricula =

Species of gastropod

Stomatella lintricula is a species of sea snail, a marine gastropod mollusk in the family Trochidae, the top snails.

== Description ==
The thin, fragile, oblong shell is shaped like a Haliotis. Its back is convex. It is all over very delicately striated. It is flesh-colored, spotted with red. The small spire is nearly terminal and laterally inclined. The open aperture is very much lengthened.

Schepman gives a somewhat divergent description: the posterior part of the shell is nearly entirely yellowish-white with a green tinge, moreover a few smaller patches of the same colour are dispersed over the anterior part, a few dark spiral lines are more conspicuous on the posterior part. The surface is covered with very fine, close-set spiral and by more remote concentric striae. The species may be easily recognized by its very elongate shape.

== Distribution ==
This marine species occurs in the Red Sea, in the Indo-Pacific (Indo-China, Indo-Malaysia, the Philippines, Japan) and off Queensland, Australia.
