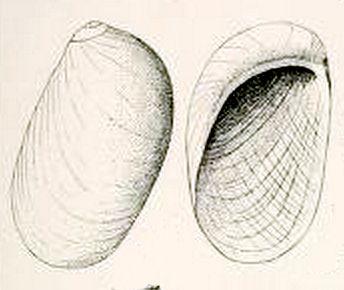
- Original drawing with two views of a shell of Stomatella terminalis

Scientific classification
- Kingdom: Animalia
- Phylum: Mollusca
- Class: Gastropoda
- Subclass: Vetigastropoda
- Order: Trochida
- Superfamily: Trochoidea
- Family: Trochidae
- Genus: Stomatella
- Species: S. terminalis

Binomial name
- Stomatella terminalis (Verco, 1905)

Synonyms
- Gena terminalis Verco, 1905

= Stomatella terminalis =

Species of gastropod

Stomatella terminalis, common name the pointed false ear, is a species of very small sea snail, a marine gastropod mollusk or micromollusk in the family Trochidae, the top snails.

== Description ==
(Original description by Joseph Verco) The height of the shell is 5.75 mm, its diameter 3 mm. The minute, thin shell has an oblong-oval shape with parallel sides parallel. The shell contains four whorls and an inconspicuous, terminal spire. Its surface is smooth and polished but for microscopic accremental lines. There are no spiral striae or incisions, except microscopic, on the base of the body whorl. Its colour is white, with crowded spiral bands of crescentic white and dark and reddish-brown spots and blotches. The radula has the following formula: ~ 1 (5.1.5).1 .~ 36 rows.

The ornament varies greatly. The shell may be blotched pink and white, and there may be numerous fine spiral, hair-like, dark lines. It was formerly Gena terminalis.

== Distribution ==
This marine species is endemic to Australia and occurs off South Australia.
