= Stomatella illusa =

Scientific classification
- Kingdom: Animalia
- Phylum: Mollusca
- Class: Gastropoda
- Subclass: Vetigastropoda
- Order: Trochida
- Superfamily: Trochoidea
- Family: Trochidae
- Genus: Stomatella
- Species: S. illusa

Binomial name
- Stomatella illusa Iredale, 1940

Synonyms
- Stomatella (Gena) illusa Iredale, 1940

Species of gastropod

Stomatella illusa is a species of sea snail, a marine gastropod mollusk in the family Trochidae, the top snails.

== Distribution ==
This marine species occurs off Norfolk Island, Australia.
