= Stomatolina danblumi =

Scientific classification
- Kingdom: Animalia
- Phylum: Mollusca
- Class: Gastropoda
- Subclass: Vetigastropoda
- Order: Trochida
- Superfamily: Trochoidea
- Family: Trochidae
- Genus: Stomatolina
- Species: S. danblumi

Binomial name
- Stomatolina danblumi Singer & Mienis, 1999

Species of gastropod

Stomatolina danblumi is a species of sea snail, a marine gastropod mollusk in the family Trochidae, the top snails.

== Description ==
The size of the shell varies between 8 mm and 15 mm.

== Distribution ==
This species occurs in the Red Sea.
