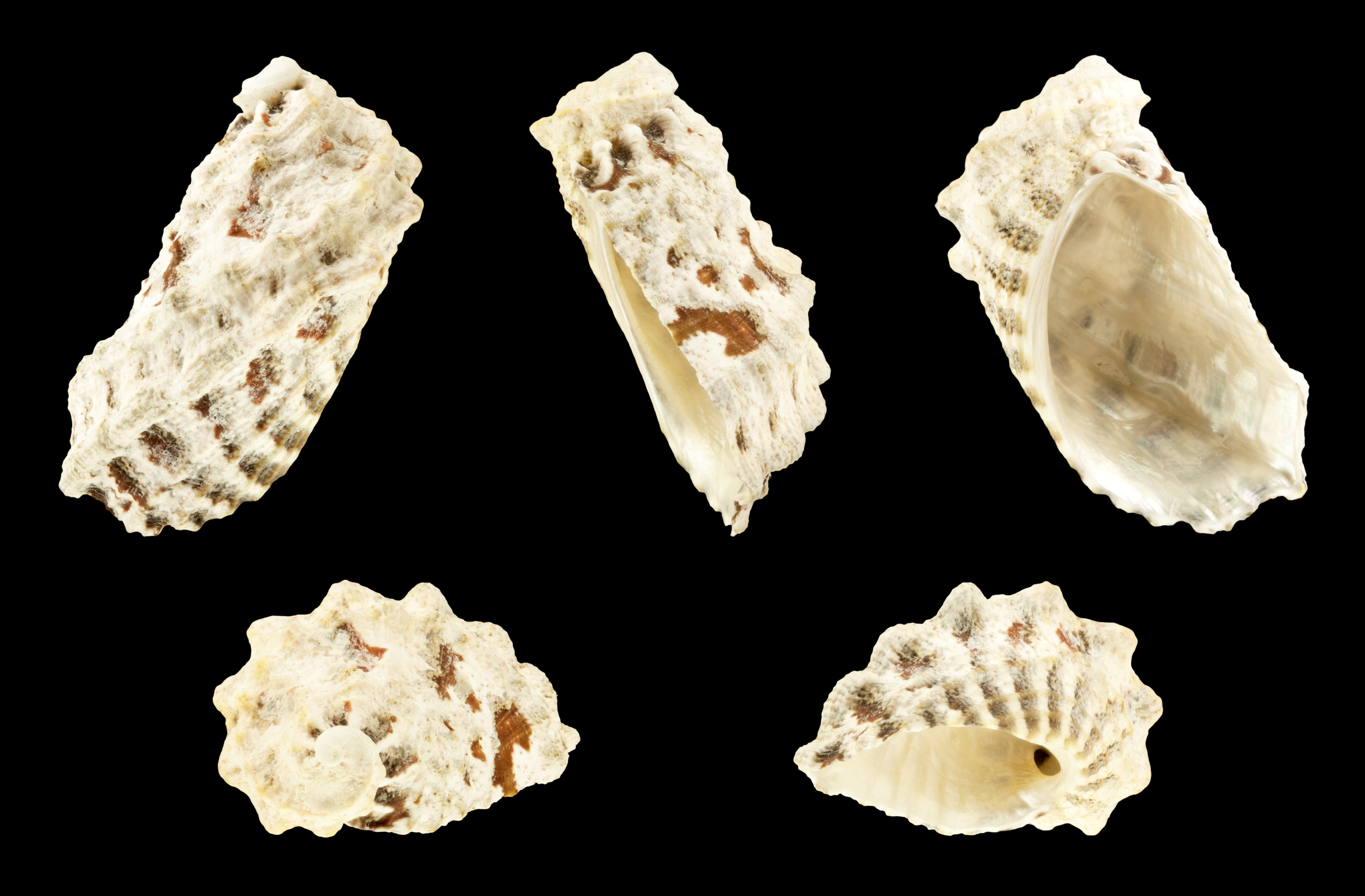
- Five views of a shell of Stomatia phymotis

Scientific classification
- Kingdom: Animalia
- Phylum: Mollusca
- Class: Gastropoda
- Subclass: Vetigastropoda
- Order: Trochida
- Superfamily: Trochoidea
- Family: Trochidae
- Genus: Stomatia
- Species: S. phymotis

Binomial name
- Stomatia phymotis (Hebling, 1779)

Synonyms
- Haliotis imperforata Gmelin, 1791; Stomatia australis A. Adams, 1850; Stomatia obscurata Lamarck, 1822; Stomatia (Miraconcha) obscura Sowerby, G.B. III, 1874; Stomax furonculus Montfort

= Stomatia phymotis =

Species of gastropod

Stomatia phymotis, common name the swollen stomatella, is a species of sea snail, a marine gastropod mollusk in the family Trochidae, the top snails.

== Description ==
The size of the shell varies between 7 mm and 35 mm. The lengthened, solid shell is ear-shaped. It has a scalar spire. The body whorl descends very deeply. The shell is lusterless, red, marked at the suture, keel and base with olive or brown articulated with white. The surface is very rough, with a strong double nodulous keel at the middle of the whorl, several nodose spiral riblets and threads below it, strongly. The shell is plicate or puckered below the sutures. The aperture is irregular-oval and nacreous inside.

There is considerable variation in both form and color.

== Distribution ==
This marine species occurs in the Red Sea, Central and East Indian Ocean, East India, Indo-Malaysia, Oceania, the Philippines, Japan, Australia (Northern Territory, Queensland, Western Australia) and Indonesia.
