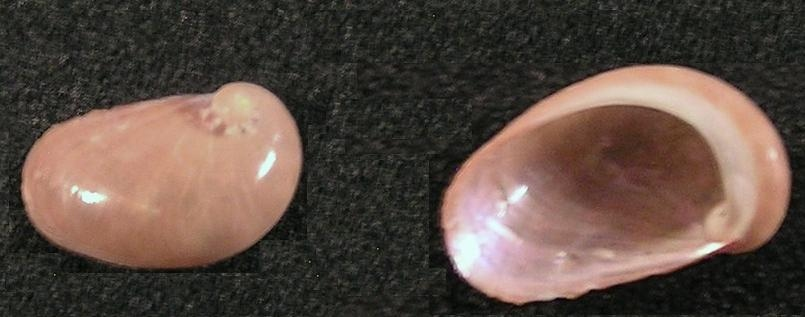
- Two views of a shell of Stomatella gattegnoi

Scientific classification
- Kingdom: Animalia
- Phylum: Mollusca
- Class: Gastropoda
- Subclass: Vetigastropoda
- Order: Trochida
- Superfamily: Trochoidea
- Family: Trochidae
- Genus: Stomatella
- Species: S. gattegnoi

Binomial name
- Stomatella gattegnoi Poppe, Tagaro & Dekker, 2006

= Stomatella gattegnoi =

Species of gastropod

Stomatella gattegnoi is a species of sea snail, a marine gastropod mollusk in the family Trochidae, the top snails.

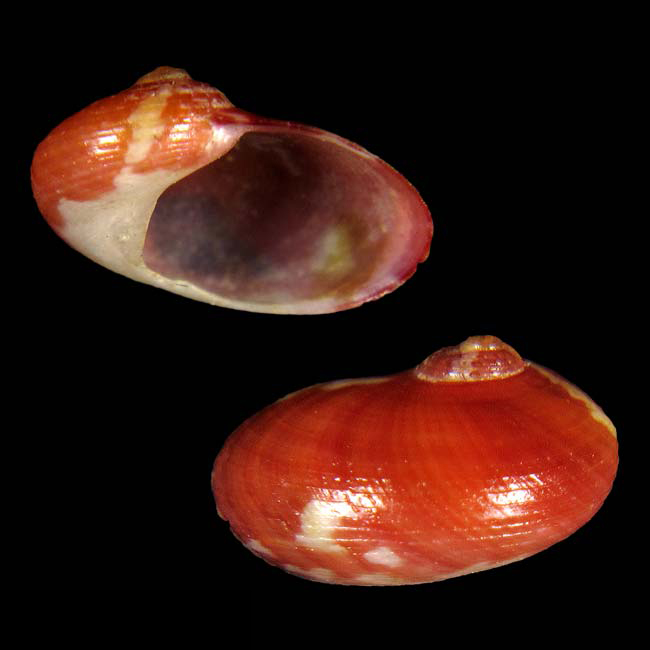
Seashell Stomatella gattegnoi

== Description ==
The size of the shell varies between 4 mm and 16 mm.

== Distribution ==
This marine species occurs off the Philippines at Mactan island at depths between 20 m and 100 m.
