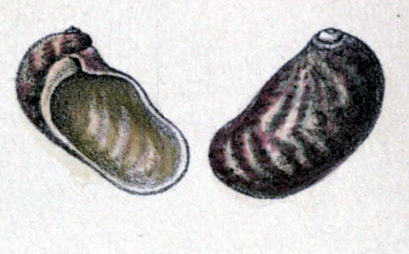
- Drawing with two views of a shell of Stomatella striatula

Scientific classification
- Kingdom: Animalia
- Phylum: Mollusca
- Class: Gastropoda
- Subclass: Vetigastropoda
- Order: Trochida
- Superfamily: Trochoidea
- Family: Trochidae
- Genus: Stomatella
- Species: S. striatula

Binomial name
- Stomatella striatula (A. Adams, 1850)

Synonyms
- Gena striatula A. Adams, 1850

= Stomatella striatula =

Species of gastropod

Stomatella striatula is a species of sea snail, a marine gastropod mollusk in the family Trochidae, the top snails.

== Description ==
The ovate-oblong shell is very elongated and shaped like Haliotis. It is slightly convex, and strongly striated all over the rather flat back. The striae are deep and rather wide apart. Its color is red varied with orange, light yellow and brown. The prominent spire is elevated and often distorted. The outer lip is very flexuous.

== Distribution ==
This marine species occurs off Australia and the Philippines.
