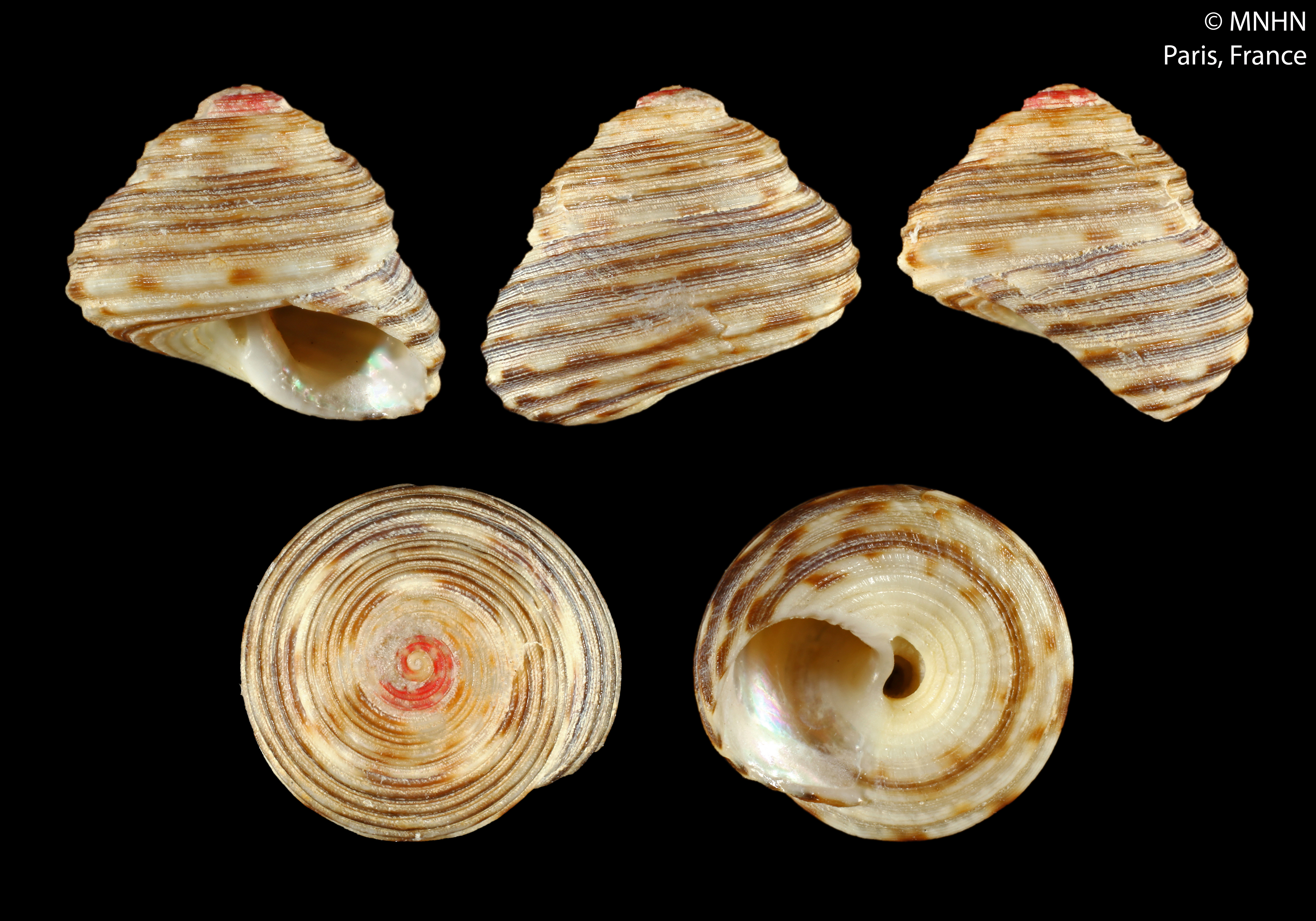
- Shell of Eurytrochus danieli (specimen at >MNHN, Paris)

Scientific classification
- Kingdom: Animalia
- Phylum: Mollusca
- Class: Gastropoda
- Subclass: Vetigastropoda
- Order: Trochida
- Superfamily: Trochoidea
- Family: Trochidae
- Genus: Eurytrochus
- Species: E. danieli

Binomial name
- Eurytrochus danieli (Crosse, 1862)

Synonyms
- Clanculus danieli Crosse, 1862; Gibbula danieli (Crosse, 1862); Gibbula filosa Garrett, 1872; Trochus danieli Fischer, 1875

= Eurytrochus danieli =

Species of sea snail

Eurytrochus danieli is a species of sea snail, a marine gastropod mollusk in the family Trochidae, the top snails.

== Description ==
The shell grows to a length of 6 mm. The narrowly umbilicate shell is depressed conoidal, and solid. This lusterless shell is whitish. The upper surface is spirally banded with dark brown. The apex is roseate. The base of the shell is light, and clouded with brown. The spiral is low-conoidal. The apex is acute. The sutures are well impressed. The five whorls are somewhat convex, spirally coarsely ridged. The ridges are not beaded. They number about 4 to 6 above the periphery, but are more numerous on the base The whole surface is closely, minutely, densely, spirally and radiately striate. The body whorl is slightly descending at the aperture. It is rounded or subcarinate at periphery. The aperture is quite oblique, rounded-subquadrate. The outer lip is slightly crenulated, and margined inside by a thin opaque white band, silvery and showing folds in the nacre within. The columella is oblique, sinuous, and a little thickened in the middle. The umbilicus is deep, narrow, and bounded by a smooth rib.

== Distribution ==
This marine species occurs off North Queensland, Australia, New Caledonia, Fiji, Samoa and the Philippines.
