= Synaptocochlea belmonti =

Scientific classification
- Kingdom: Animalia
- Phylum: Mollusca
- Class: Gastropoda
- Subclass: Vetigastropoda
- Order: Trochida
- Family: Trochidae
- Subfamily: Fossarininae
- Genus: Synaptocochlea
- Species: S. belmonti

Binomial name
- Synaptocochlea belmonti Simone, 2009

Species of sea snail

Synaptocochlea belmonti is a species of sea snail, a marine gastropod mollusk in the family Trochidae, the top snails.

== Distribution ==
This marine species occurs off Brazil.
