= Eurytrochus affinis =

Scientific classification
- Kingdom: Animalia
- Phylum: Mollusca
- Class: Gastropoda
- Subclass: Vetigastropoda
- Order: Trochida
- Superfamily: Trochoidea
- Family: Trochidae
- Genus: Eurytrochus
- Species: E. affinis

Binomial name
- Eurytrochus affinis (Garrett, 1872)

Synonyms
- Clanculus cognatus (Pilsbry, 1903); Eurytrochus affinis cognatus (Pilsbry, 1903); Eurytrochus cognatus (Pilsbry, 1903); Gibbula (Eurytrochus) affinis Garrett, 1872; Gibbula affinis Garrett, 1872; Gibbula affinis var. cognata Pilsbry, 1903

Species of gastropod

Eurytrochus affinis is a species of sea snail, a marine gastropod mollusk in the family Trochidae, the top snails. The size of the shell varies between 3 mm and 9 mm. This marine shell occurs off the Ryukyus, Japan, Taiwan and the Philippines
