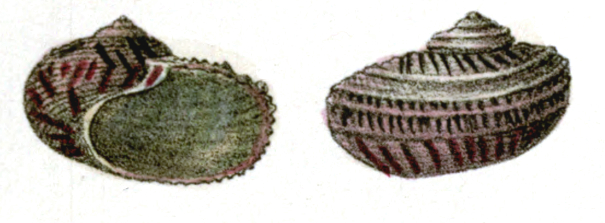
- Drawing with two views of a shell of Stomatia splendidula

Scientific classification
- Kingdom: Animalia
- Phylum: Mollusca
- Class: Gastropoda
- Subclass: Vetigastropoda
- Order: Trochida
- Superfamily: Trochoidea
- Family: Trochidae
- Genus: Stomatia
- Species: S. splendidula

Binomial name
- Stomatia splendidula A. Adams, 1855

= Stomatia splendidula =

Species of gastropod

Stomatia splendidula is a species of sea snail, a marine gastropod mollusk in the family Trochidae, the top snails.

== Description ==
The imperforate shell is ear-shaped and orbicularly depressed. The shell contains 3 bicarinate whorls. The roughened body whorl is transversely lirate with unequal line. The interstices are longitudinally striated. The shell is pale above, with radiating reddish-brown flames at the sutures, below reddish dotted with brown. The base of the shell is ornamented with red radiating flames. The aperture is white and opaque within, with bright green lines. Its margin is pearly.

In this species the columellar margin is reflexed and pearly, but the interior of the aperture, with the exception of the internal margin of the outer lip, is opaque white, with green spiral lines.

== Distribution ==
This species occurs in the Indian Ocean off Aldabra; in the Pacific Ocean off Japan.
