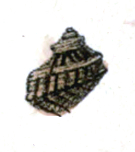
- Drawing of a shell of Stomatia decussata

Scientific classification
- Kingdom: Animalia
- Phylum: Mollusca
- Class: Gastropoda
- Subclass: Vetigastropoda
- Order: Trochida
- Superfamily: Trochoidea
- Family: Trochidae
- Genus: Stomatia
- Species: S. decussata

Binomial name
- Stomatia decussata A. Adams, 1850

= Stomatia decussata =

Species of gastropod

Stomatia decussata is a species of sea snail, a marine gastropod mollusk in the family Trochidae, the top snails.

== Description ==
The ovate-oblong shell is longitudinally and transversely decussately striate, with two simple or subtuberculated angular, prominent carinae. The shell is pale, varied with brown spots. The spire is elevated. The oblique aperture is nearly circular. The lip is biangulate in the middle.

This species is decussated with transverse and longitudinal striae, and there are two prominent, angular, keels on the whorls. The spire is acute and prominent.

== Distribution ==
This marine species occurs off the Philippines and off Queensland, Australia
