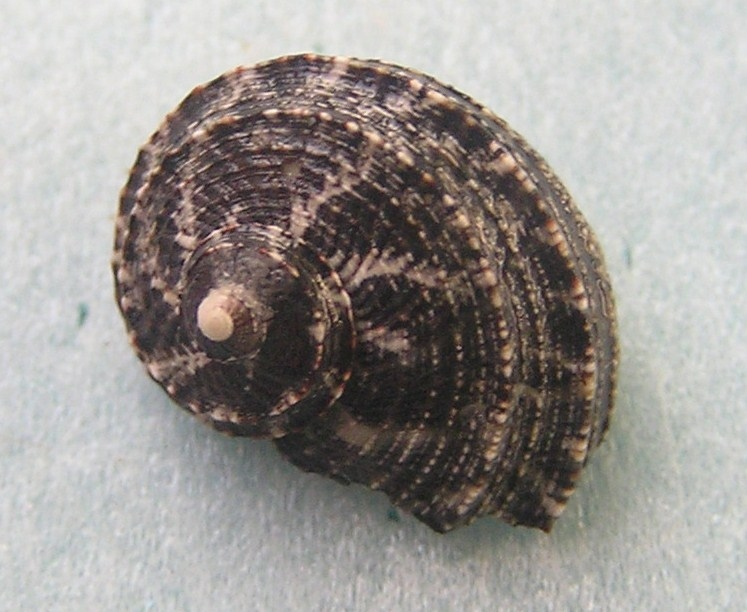
- Apical view of a shell of Stomatolina angulata

Scientific classification
- Kingdom: Animalia
- Phylum: Mollusca
- Class: Gastropoda
- Subclass: Vetigastropoda
- Order: Trochida
- Superfamily: Trochoidea
- Family: Trochidae
- Genus: Stomatolina; Iredale, 1937

Type species
- Stomatella rufescens Gray, 1847

= Stomatolina =

Genus of gastropods

Stomatolina is a genus of sea snails, marine gastropod mollusks in the family Trochidae, the top snails.

== Description ==
The depressed shell is rather flattened above and below. The aperture is quite oblique. The sculpture consists of numerous spirals, of which several have low carinae, more numerous intermediate riblets, and still more numerous interstitial spiral striae. These are sometimes decussated by growth lines.

== Distribution ==
This maritime genus occurs in the Red Sea and off Indo-Malaysia, Oceania, Cook Islands, French Polynesia, Korea, the Philippines and Australia (Northern Territory, Queensland).

== Species ==
Species within the genus Stomatolina include:

- Stomatolina angulata (A. Adams, 1850)
- Stomatolina arabica (A. Adams, 1854)
- Stomatolina calliostoma (A. Adams, 1850)
- Stomatolina danblumi Singer & Mienis, 1999
- Stomatolina irisata (Dufo, 1840)
- Stomatolina mariei (Crosse, 1871)
- Stomatolina rubra (Lamarck, 1822)
- Stomatolina rufescens (Gray, 1847)

The Indo-Pacific Molluscan Database also mentions the following species

- Stomatolina orbiculata (A. Adams, 1850)

Synonyms

- Stomatolina scitula (H. Adams, 1872): synonym of Stomatella modesta H. Adams & A. Adams, 1864

Taxa inquirenda

- Stomatolina acuminata (A. Adams, 1850)
- Stomatolina compta (A. Adams, 1855)
- Stomatolina crenulata (Preston, 1908)
- Stomatolina exquisita (G. B. Sowerby III, 1903)
- Stomatolina fulgurans (A. Adams, 1850)
- Stomatolina japonica (A. Adams, 1850)
- Stomatolina lirata (A. Adams, 1850)
- Stomatolina malukana (A. Adams, 1850)
- Stomatolina sanguinea (A. Adams, 1850)
- Stomatolina speciosa (A. Adams, 1850)
- Stomatolina tigrina (A. Adams, 1850)
