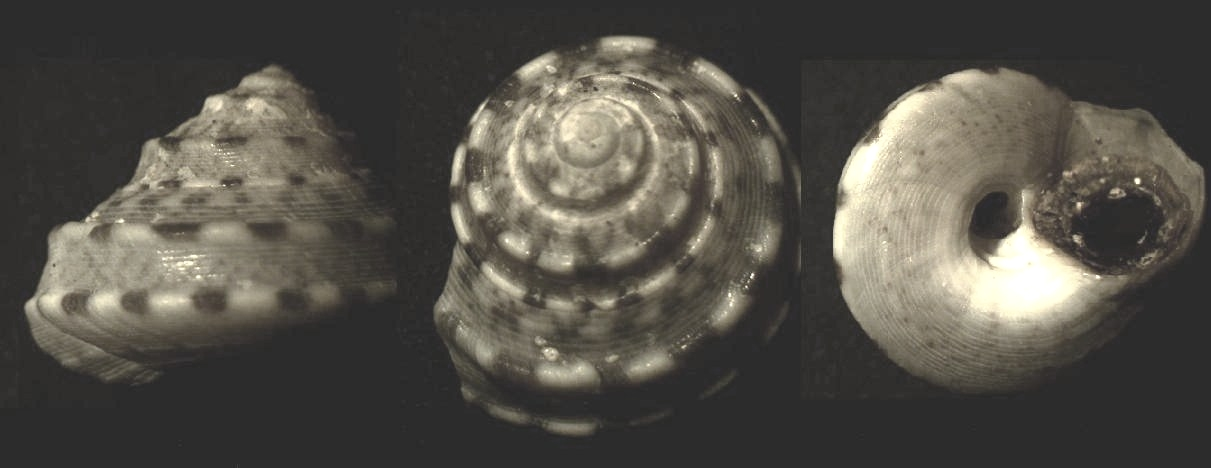
- Three views of a shell of Notogibbula preissiana

Scientific classification
- Kingdom: Animalia
- Phylum: Mollusca
- Class: Gastropoda
- Subclass: Vetigastropoda
- Order: Trochida
- Superfamily: Trochoidea
- Family: Trochidae
- Genus: Notogibbula
- Species: N. preissiana

Binomial name
- Notogibbula preissiana (Philippi, 1848)

Synonyms
- Gibbula porcellana A. Adams, 1853; Gibbula preissiana Adams, A. 1855; Gibbula weldii Tenison-Woods, 1877; Monilea preissiana Pilsbry, H.A. 1889; Trochus preissianus Philippi, 1849 (original combination)

= Notogibbula preissiana =

Species of gastropod

Notogibbula preissiana, common name the twin-keeled top shell, is a species of small sea snail, a marine gastropod mollusc in the family Trochidae, the top shells.

== Description ==
The size of the shell varies between 7 mm and 9 mm. The rather thick, deeply umbilicate shell has an orbicular-depressed shape. The 5 to 5½ whorls are separated by profound sutures. The shells are whitish, conspicuously ornamented with flexuous rosy-brownish lines, and remote spots at the suture and periphery. The first whorls are smooth. The following whorls are spirally, delicately sulcate, with an elevated ridge in the middle. The body whorl is bicingulate, the cinguli elevated and distant. The convex base of the shell is concentrically lirate with the lirae larger around the umbilicus. The umbilical area is sulcate and funiculate within. The aperture is subrotund. The columella is arcuate, not dentate.

== Distribution ==
This marine species is endemic to Australia and occurs off South Australia, Victoria and Western Australia.
