= Stomatella esperanzae =

Scientific classification
- Kingdom: Animalia
- Phylum: Mollusca
- Class: Gastropoda
- Subclass: Vetigastropoda
- Order: Trochida
- Superfamily: Trochoidea
- Family: Trochidae
- Genus: Stomatella
- Species: S. esperanzae

Binomial name
- Stomatella esperanzae Rehder, 1980

Species of gastropod

Stomatella esperanzae is a species of sea snail, a marine gastropod mollusk in the family Trochidae, the top snails.

== Distribution ==
This species occurs in the Pacific Ocean off Easter Island.
