= Stomatella haliotiformis =

Scientific classification
- Kingdom: Animalia
- Phylum: Mollusca
- Class: Gastropoda
- Subclass: Vetigastropoda
- Order: Trochida
- Superfamily: Trochoidea
- Family: Trochidae
- Genus: Stomatella
- Species: S. haliotiformis

Binomial name
- Stomatella haliotiformis Kuroda & Habe, 1961

Species of gastropod

Stomatella haliotiformis is a species of sea snail, a marine gastropod mollusk in the family Trochidae, the top snails.

== Distribution ==
This marine species occurs off Japan.
