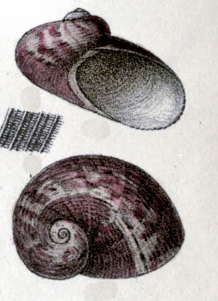
- Drawing with two voews of a shell of Stomatella elegans and a detail of its sculpture.

Scientific classification
- Kingdom: Animalia
- Phylum: Mollusca
- Class: Gastropoda
- Subclass: Vetigastropoda
- Order: Trochida
- Superfamily: Trochoidea
- Family: Trochidae
- Genus: Stomatella
- Species: S. elegans

Binomial name
- Stomatella elegans Gray, 1847

Synonyms
- Granata elegans (Gray, 1847)

= Stomatella elegans =

Species of gastropod

Stomatella elegans, common name the elegant stomatella, is a species of sea snail, a marine gastropod mollusk in the family Trochidae.

== Description ==
(Original description by Gray) The height of the shell attains 25 mm. The oblong shell is rather depressed. Its color is white, black-spotted, showing the pearl through the semitransparent outer coat. It is closely and regularly spirally striated and concentrically wrinkled. The small spire is conical. The rounded whorls are convex. The body whorl is very rapidly enlarging. The oblong aperture spreads out twice as wide as the diameter of the last whorl. but one. The columella is less arched, and is flattened. The axis is imperforated. The smooth throat is silvery pearly.

== Distribution ==
This marine species occurs in the Northwest Indian Ocean and the Western Pacific; also in the Great Barrier Reef, Australia.
