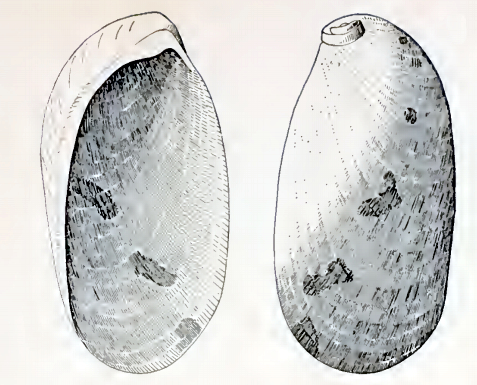
- Original drawing with two views of a shell of Stomatella ungula

Scientific classification
- Kingdom: Animalia
- Phylum: Mollusca
- Class: Gastropoda
- Subclass: Vetigastropoda
- Order: Trochida
- Superfamily: Trochoidea
- Family: Trochidae
- Genus: Stomatella
- Species: S. ungula

Binomial name
- Stomatella ungula (Hedley, 1907)

Synonyms(Hedley, 1907)
- Gena ungula Hedley, 1907

= Stomatella ungula =

Species of gastropod

Stomatella ungula is a species of sea snail, a marine gastropod mollusk in the family Trochidae, the top snails.

== Description ==
(Original description by Charles Hedley) The length of the shell attains 3.4 mm, its diameter 1.65 mm. The small, thin, attenuated shell has an oblong-ovate shape. It is, about twice as long as broad, arched. The minute spire is flat and consists of two whorls. It is at right angles to the shell's length and terminal. Its colour is white with irregular crimson splashes spirally arranged along the back. Its sculpture consists of fine spiral grooves decussated by growth lines. The peristome is nearly in one plane and is angled above. The columella is slightly thickened.

== Distribution ==
This marine species is endemic to Australia, and occurs off Queensland.
