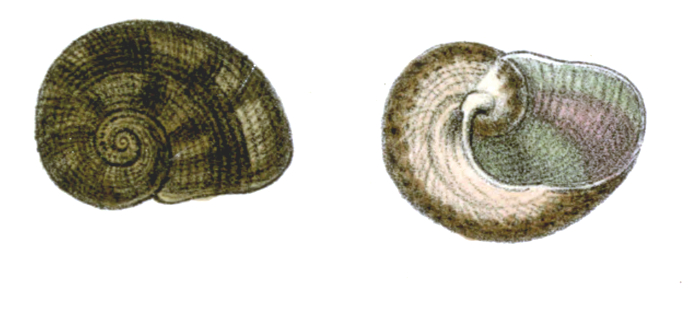
- Drawing with two views of a shell of Stomatolina mariei

Scientific classification
- Kingdom: Animalia
- Phylum: Mollusca
- Class: Gastropoda
- Subclass: Vetigastropoda
- Order: Trochida
- Superfamily: Trochoidea
- Family: Trochidae
- Genus: Stomatolina
- Species: S. mariei

Binomial name
- Stomatolina mariei (Crosse, 1871)

Synonyms
- Stomatella mariei Crosse, H. 1871

= Stomatolina mariei =

Species of gastropod

Stomatolina mariei is a species of sea snail, a marine gastropod mollusk in the family Trochidae, the top snails.

== Description ==
The size of the shell varies between 8 mm and 15 mm. The depressed, thin shell has a small, erect, acute spire. The color a delicate pinkish fawn, clouded and mottled with reddish-brown, articulated on the spirals with white spots. The baseof the shell contains radiating whitish flames. The surface is scarcely shining and is sculptured with separated narrow spirals above, and very numerous finer ones, covering the spaces between them. The striae of growth are excessively close and fine, scarcely visible. The principal spiral threads are articulated white and pink, and a trifle crenulated. The base of the shell is smoother, with separated linear spirals. The spire is short. Its outlines are concave. The apical whorl is corneous, projecting, and rounded. It follows the whorls of the spire lirate, with scalloped sutures. The body whorl descends anteriorly and is very broad. The oval aperture is finely sulcate within. It is nacreous, the predominant color being silvery or pinkish. The columella is a little expanded above, over a minute umbilical chink and surrounded by a crescentic opaque white, sharply defined tract.

== Distribution ==
This species occurs in the Red Sea; off New Caledonia and off Queensland, Australia

== Bibliography ==
- Crosse, H. (1871). "Diagnoses Molluscorum Novae Caledoniae". Journal de Conchyliologie. 19 (3): 201–206.
- Rippingale, O.H.; McMichael, D.F. (1961). Queensland and Great Barrier Reef Shells. Brisbane: Jacaranda Press.
