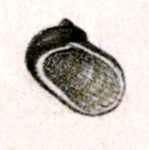
- Drawing of a shell of Synaptocochlea caliginosa

Scientific classification
- Kingdom: Animalia
- Phylum: Mollusca
- Class: Gastropoda
- Subclass: Vetigastropoda
- Order: Trochida
- Family: Trochidae
- Subfamily: Fossarininae
- Genus: Synaptocochlea
- Species: S. caliginosa

Binomial name
- Synaptocochlea caliginosa (H. Adams & A. Adams, 1863)

Synonyms
- Gena caliginosa (Adams in Sowerby); Stomatella caliginosa H. & A. Adams, 1863 (original description)

= Synaptocochlea caliginosa =

Species of gastropod

Synaptocochlea caliginosa is a species of sea snail, a marine gastropod mollusk in the family Trochidae, the top snails.

== Description ==
The oblong, imperforate shell is ear-shaped. Its color is blackish. The spire is small. The shell is transversely lirate, larger and smaller lirae alternating, obsoletely articulated with white. The oblong aperture is very oblique, greenish white within. Its black margin is crenulate. The inner lip is rather flattened. There is a narrow lunar umbilical rimation. The thin operculum is orbicular and multispiral

== Distribution ==
This marine species occurs in the Indian Ocean off Mauritius.
