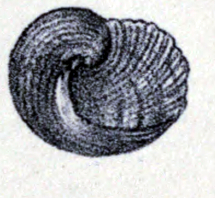
- Drawing of a shell of Stomatolina rufescens

Scientific classification
- Kingdom: Animalia
- Phylum: Mollusca
- Class: Gastropoda
- Subclass: Vetigastropoda
- Order: Trochida
- Superfamily: Trochoidea
- Family: Trochidae
- Genus: Stomatolina
- Species: S. rufescens

Binomial name
- Stomatolina rufescens (Gray, 1847)

Synonyms
- Stomatia rufescens (Gray, 1847); Stomatella rufescens Gray, 1847 (original combination)

= Stomatolina rufescens =

Species of gastropod

Stomatolina rufescens, common name the northern wide-mouthed shell, is a species of small sea snail, a marine gastropod mollusk in the family Trochidae, the top snails.

== Description ==
The brown, suborbicular shell is rather depressed. The conical spire is rather acute. The whorls enlarge rapidly. They are rather convex, concentrically striated with rather unequal acute spiral ridges. In the upper whorls two or three of the ridges are larger and higher than the rest. The last whorl shows closer, less raised ridges in front. The aperture is oblong, two-thirds the diameter of the shell in width. The inner lip is arched and has a crenulate edge. The axis of the shell is imperforated. The throat is silvery pearly, with a pale reddish edge.

== Distribution ==
This marine species is endemic to Australia and occurs off the Northern Territory and Queensland.
