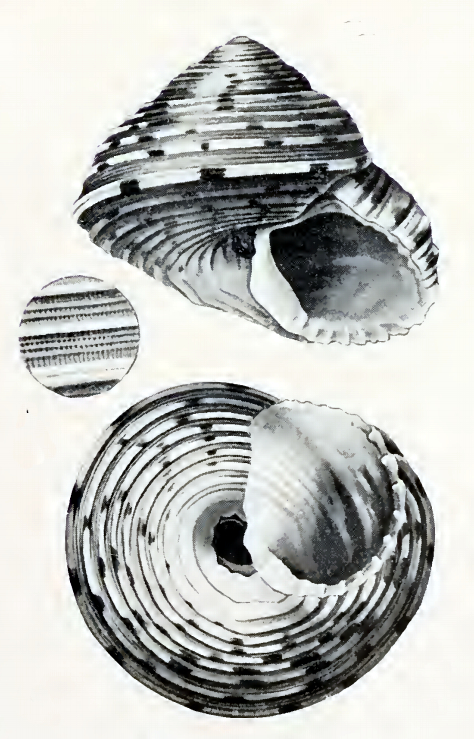
- Original drawing with two views of a shell of Eurytrochus maccullochi

Scientific classification
- Kingdom: Animalia
- Phylum: Mollusca
- Class: Gastropoda
- Subclass: Vetigastropoda
- Order: Trochida
- Superfamily: Trochoidea
- Family: Trochidae
- Genus: Eurytrochus
- Species: E. maccullochi

Binomial name
- Eurytrochus maccullochi (Hedley, 1907)

Synonyms
- Gibbula macculochi Hedley, 1907 (original combination); Gibbula (Eurytrochus) macculochi (Hedley, 1907); Notogibbula maccullochi (Hedley, 1907)

= Eurytrochus maccullochi =

Species of gastropod

Eurytrochus maccullochi is a species of small sea snail, a marine gastropod mollusk in the family Trochidae, the top snails.

== Description ==
The shell grows to a length of 6 mm, its diameter 6.5 mm. The small, very solid shell has a depressedly globose shape and is subcarinate. Its colour is dull white, radially painted with flames of black or chocolate, which persist more on ribs than interstices. The shell contains six whorls. Their sculpture shows above the periphery six subgranose spiral ribs, elevated, widely spaced, increasing in size from the suture to the periphery and ascending the spire. The interstices are occupied by one or two spiral threads and roughened by fine radial growth lines. On the base, eight similar spiral cords decrease in size from the periphery to the umbilicus. The subquadrate aperture descends slightly but suddenly. The inner edge is bevelled, of a dull callus, radiately plicate, the margins united by a thick layer of callus, within brilliantly nacreous. An expansion of the columella slightly intrudes upon the umbilicus, which is narrow but deep, margined by a crenulate rib, internally with two deep-seated funicles.

== Distribution ==
This marine species is endemic to and occurs off North Queensland, Australia.
