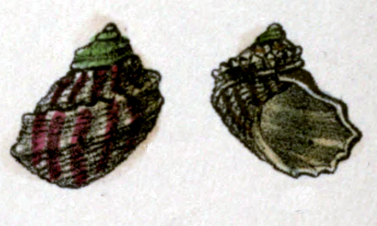
- Drawing with two views of a shell of Stomatella duplicata

Scientific classification
- Kingdom: Animalia
- Phylum: Mollusca
- Class: Gastropoda
- Subclass: Vetigastropoda
- Order: Trochida
- Superfamily: Trochoidea
- Family: Trochidae
- Genus: Stomatella
- Species: S. duplicata

Binomial name
- Stomatella duplicata (G. B. Sowerby I, 1823)

Synonyms
- Stomatia duplicata G.B. Sowerby I, 1823

= Stomatella duplicata =

Species of gastropod

Stomatella duplicata is a species of sea snail, a marine gastropod mollusk in the family Trochidae, the top snails.

== Description ==
The height of the shell attains 14 mm, its diameter 14 mm. The rather solid shell has a depressed-globose shape with a conical spire. It is longitudinally striped with purplish or red and white. Its surface contains numerous fine, unequal spiral threads above and two strong nodose keels at the periphery, and about 7 subequal lirae on the base. Their interstices are spirally striate. The prominent spire contains three bicarinate whorls, the last notably so. They are concave above the carina and plicate below the sutures. The rounded aperture is oblique. The thin columella is concave. The white umbilical tract is a little grooved.

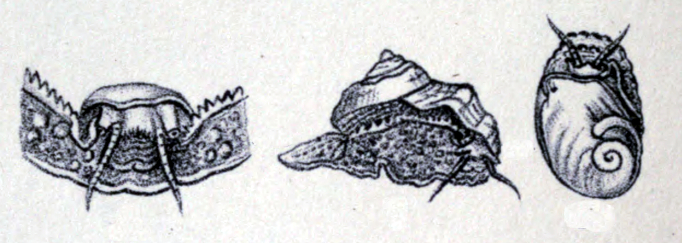
Drawing with three views of the animal and shell of Stomatella duplicata

== Distribution ==
This marine species occurs in the following locations:

- Red Sea
- the Philippines
