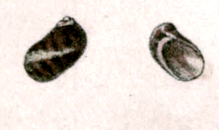
- Image with two views of a shell of Synaptocochlea asperulata

Scientific classification
- Kingdom: Animalia
- Phylum: Mollusca
- Class: Gastropoda
- Subclass: Vetigastropoda
- Order: Trochida
- Family: Trochidae
- Subfamily: Fossarininae
- Genus: Synaptocochlea
- Species: S. asperulata

Binomial name
- Synaptocochlea asperulata (A. Adams, 1850)

Synonyms
- Gena asperulata A. Adams, 1850; Stomatella asperulata (A. Adams, 1850) (superseded combination)

= Synaptocochlea asperulata =

Species of gastropod

Synaptocochlea asperulata is a species of sea snail, a marine gastropod mollusk in the family Trochidae, the top snails.

== Description ==
The shell is haliotis-shaped with a convex back. It is rufous-brown, ornamented with a broad white girdle. It is decussated by elevated rather close-set lines and oblique striae. The white spire is posterior, rather prominent. The long aperture is oval.
