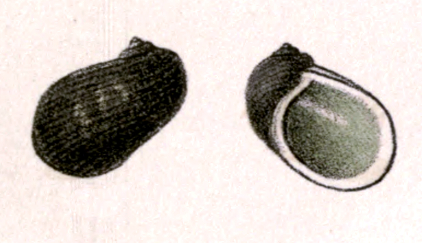
- Drawing with two views of a shell of Synaptocochlea stellata

Scientific classification
- Kingdom: Animalia
- Phylum: Mollusca
- Class: Gastropoda
- Subclass: Vetigastropoda
- Order: Trochida
- Family: Trochidae
- Genus: Synaptocochlea
- Species: S. stellata

Binomial name
- Synaptocochlea stellata (Souverbie, 1863)

Synonyms
- Gena stellata (Souverbie in Souverbie & Montrouzier, 1863); Stomatella ornata Brazier, 1877; Synaptocochlea stellata (Souverbie in Souverbie & Montrouzier, 1863)

= Synaptocochlea stellata =

Species of gastropod

Synaptocochlea stellata is a species of sea snail, a marine gastropod mollusk in the family Trochidae, the top snails.

This species has become a "species inquirenda", meaning of doubtful identity.

== Description ==
The heigfht of the shell attains 7½ mm, its diameter 5¼ mm. The shell is ear-shaped, with a minute spire and a very large, convex body whorl. Its surface is somewhat shining, black with scattered whitish dots, spots or zigzag lines. The shell is sculptured by numerous close microscopic spiral striae, several smaller alternating with larger ones, and somewhat decussated by impressed growth lines. The spire is very short with a minute whitish nucleus. The three whorls are convex. The body whorl is very large. The ovate aperture is angled above, polished, and bright inside, and of a blue color. The columella is arched. A slight chink is at the place of the umbilicus.

== Distribution ==
This marine species occurs off Madagascar and in the Indo-Pacific, off New Caledonia; off Queensland, Australia.
