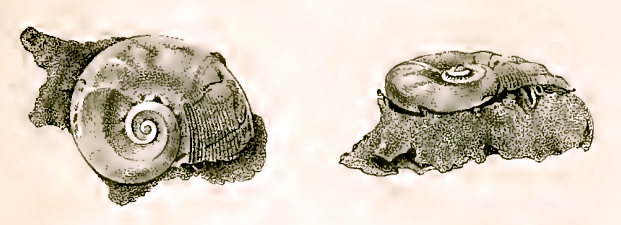
- Drawing with two views of the animal and the shell of Microtis tuberculata

Scientific classification
- Kingdom: Animalia
- Phylum: Mollusca
- Class: Gastropoda
- Subclass: Vetigastropoda
- Order: Trochida
- Superfamily: Trochoidea
- Family: Trochidae
- Genus: Microtis
- Species: M. tuberculata

Binomial name
- Microtis tuberculata A. Adams, 1850

Synonyms
- Microtis heckeliana (Crosse, 1871); Stomatia planulata Schepman, 1908

= Microtis tuberculata =

Species of gastropod

Microtis tuberculata is a species of sea snail, a marine gastropod mollusk in the family Trochidae, the top snails.

== Description ==
The size of the shell varies between 9 mm and 20 mm. The shell is much depressed, the spire reaches only a trifle above the body whorl. The colour is variable; in both specimens a greenish-grey colour predominates. In the largest one, the top whorls are variegated with crimson and a large patch of the same colour occupies the upper part of the body whorl, near the aperture. The upper part is covered by microscopic spiral rows of darker arrowhead-shaped spots, the basal part is more yellowish. The shell contains about 3½ whorls. The last whorl increases rapidly. They are very convex, with a deep suture, and short subsutural folds. The sculpture consists of a keel at some distance from the suture, enclosing a concave zone, and another keel near the periphery. Between these keels runs a row of elongated, slightly oblique tubercles. Moreover the whole shell is covered with fine spiral striae and still finer growth-striae. The aperture is very oblique, its upper margin concave near the body whorl, then strongly convex.

The animal is large. The upper surface of the foot is granular and tuberculate, with three epipodial cirri, of which the third is placed on the detachable part of the foot.

== Distribution ==
This marine species occurs in the Indo-West Pacific, Oceania, Indo-Malaysia and Australia (Northern Territory, Queensland, Western Australia)
