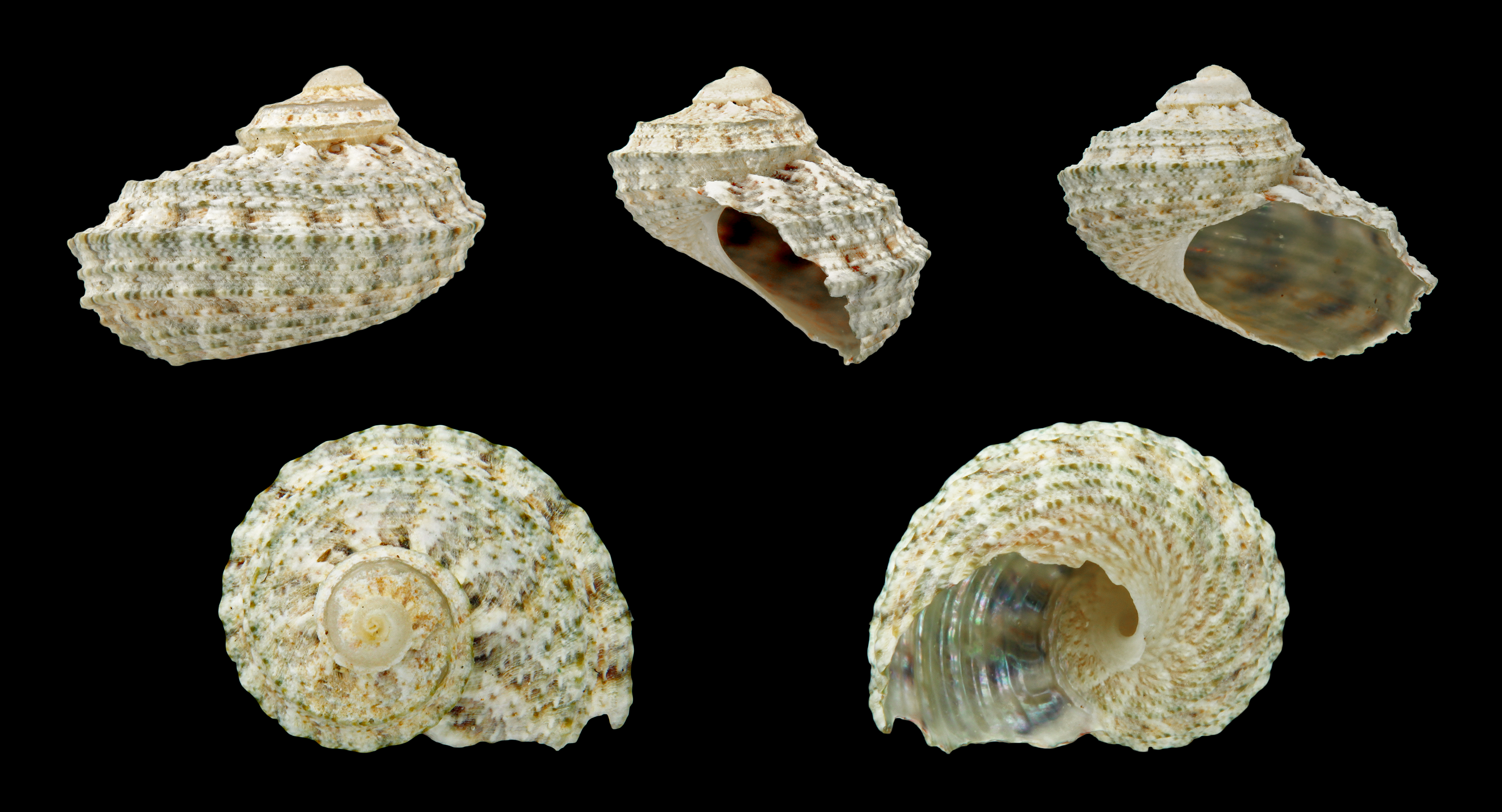
- A shell of Stomatolina angulata

Scientific classification
- Kingdom: Animalia
- Phylum: Mollusca
- Class: Gastropoda
- Subclass: Vetigastropoda
- Order: Trochida
- Superfamily: Trochoidea
- Family: Trochidae
- Genus: Stomatolina
- Species: S. angulata

Binomial name
- Stomatolina angulata (A. Adams, 1850)

Synonyms
- Stomatia angulata A. Adams, 1850

= Stomatolina angulata =

Species of gastropod

Stomatolina angulata is a species of sea snail, a marine gastropod mollusk in the family Trochidae, the top snails.

== Description ==
The length of the shell varies between 5 mm and 16 mm. The depressed shell is thin but rather solid, with very short, conical spire. It is greenish gray, obscurely longitudinally striped with dull, pale reddish brown. The surface is lusterless, with numerous unequal spiral threads, latticed by wavy riblets of growth. The three whorls are encircled by two strong carinae above, and numerous smaller lirae below the periphery and with strong, short subsutural folds. The body whorl is large, depressed, and impressed at the place of umbilicus. The oblique aperture is subrotund.

== Distribution ==
The marine species occurs off the Philippines and Japan.
