= Synaptocochlea concinna =

- Drawing of a shell of Synaptocochlea concinna

Scientific classification
- Kingdom: Animalia
- Phylum: Mollusca
- Class: Gastropoda
- Subclass: Vetigastropoda
- Order: Trochida
- Family: Trochidae
- Subfamily: Fossarininae
- Genus: Synaptocochlea
- Species: S. concinna

Binomial name
- Synaptocochlea concinna (Gould, 1845)

Synonyms
- Gena nebulosa A. Adams, 1850 (original combination); Stomatella concinna Gould, 1845; Stomatella concinna inconcinna Pilsbry, 1921; Stomatella nebulosa (A. Adams, 1850) (superseded combination)

Species of gastropod

Synaptocochlea concinna is a species of sea snail, a marine gastropod mollusk in the family Trochidae, the top snails.

== Description ==
The size of the shell varies between 3 mm and 8 mm.

(Description as Stomatella nebulosa) The ovate-oblong shell is shaped like a Haliotis. Its back all is over striated. Its color is white, clouded with reddish brown. The spire is somewhat prominent with angular whorls. The oval aperture is elongate. The columella covers the umbilical fissure with a thick callus.

== Distribution ==
This marine species occurs in the tropical Indo-West Pacific, Indo-Malaysia, Hawaii, Oceania and off Australia (Northern Territory, Queensland, Western Australia).
