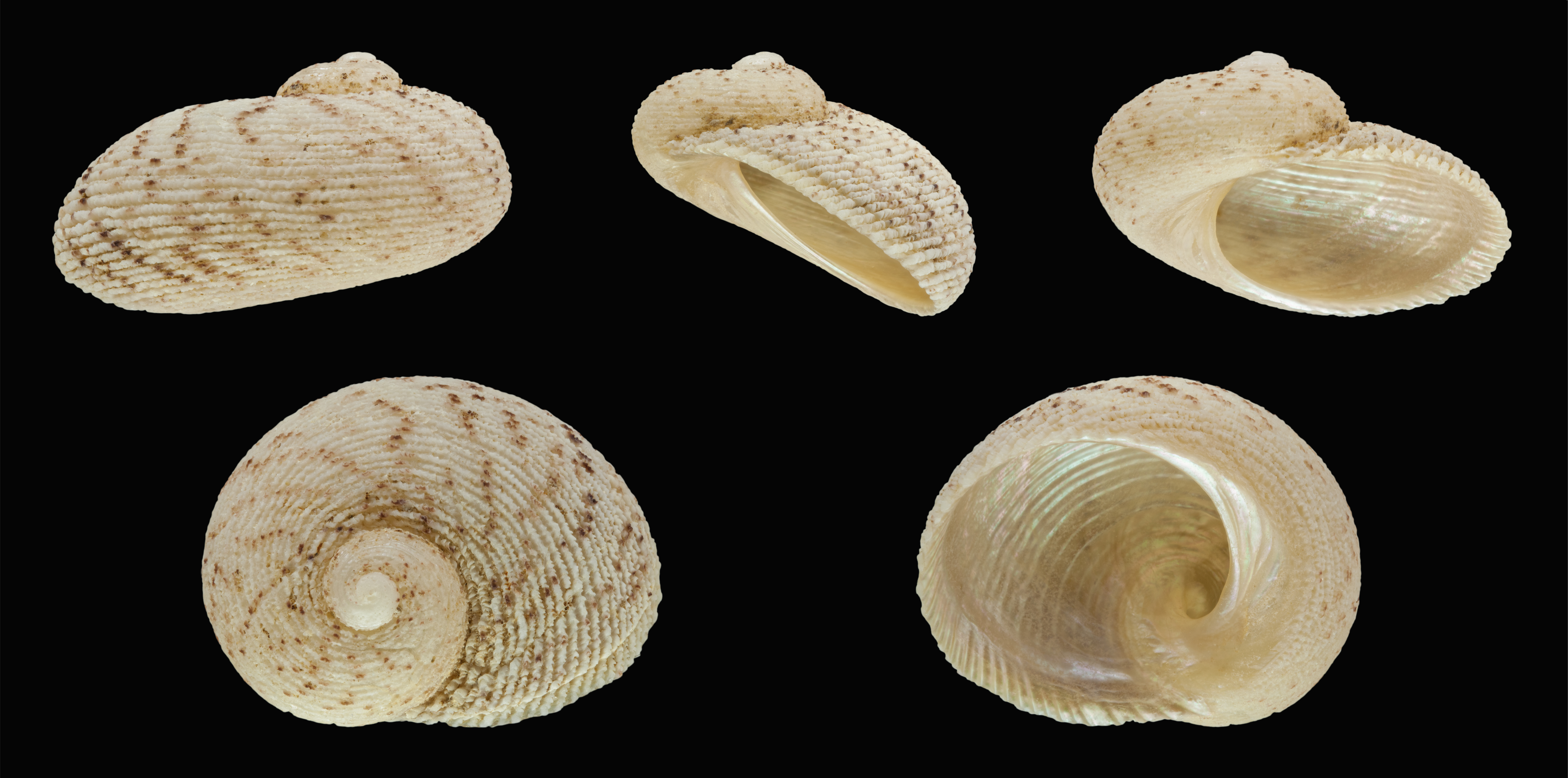
- Five views of a shell of Granata imbricata

Scientific classification
- Kingdom: Animalia
- Phylum: Mollusca
- Class: Gastropoda
- Subclass: Vetigastropoda
- Superfamily: Seguenzioidea
- Family: Chilodontaidae
- Genus: Granata
- Species: G. imbricata

Binomial name
- Granata imbricata (Lamarck, 1816)

Synonyms
- Stomatella imbricata Lamarck, 1816

= Granata imbricata =

Species of gastropod

Granata imbricata, common names the imbricate margarite, tiled false ear shell, true wide-mouthed shell, is a species of sea snail, a marine gastropod mollusk in the family Chilodontaidae.

== Distribution ==
This marine species occurs off New South Wales, South Australia and Tasmania.

== Description ==
The size of the shell varies between 19 mm and 43 mm. The solid shell is very much depressed. It is white with scattered reddish dots. Its surface is covered with very numerous, close, equal spiral riblets, separated by deep interstices. Seen closely, it is finely scaly. It has a low, short spire. The four whorls widen with extreme rapidity. The subhorizontal aperture is transverse-oval. It is lined with a closely sulcate silvery and iridescent nacre. The broad columella is flattened, and a little concave. Its edge is arched and thin.
