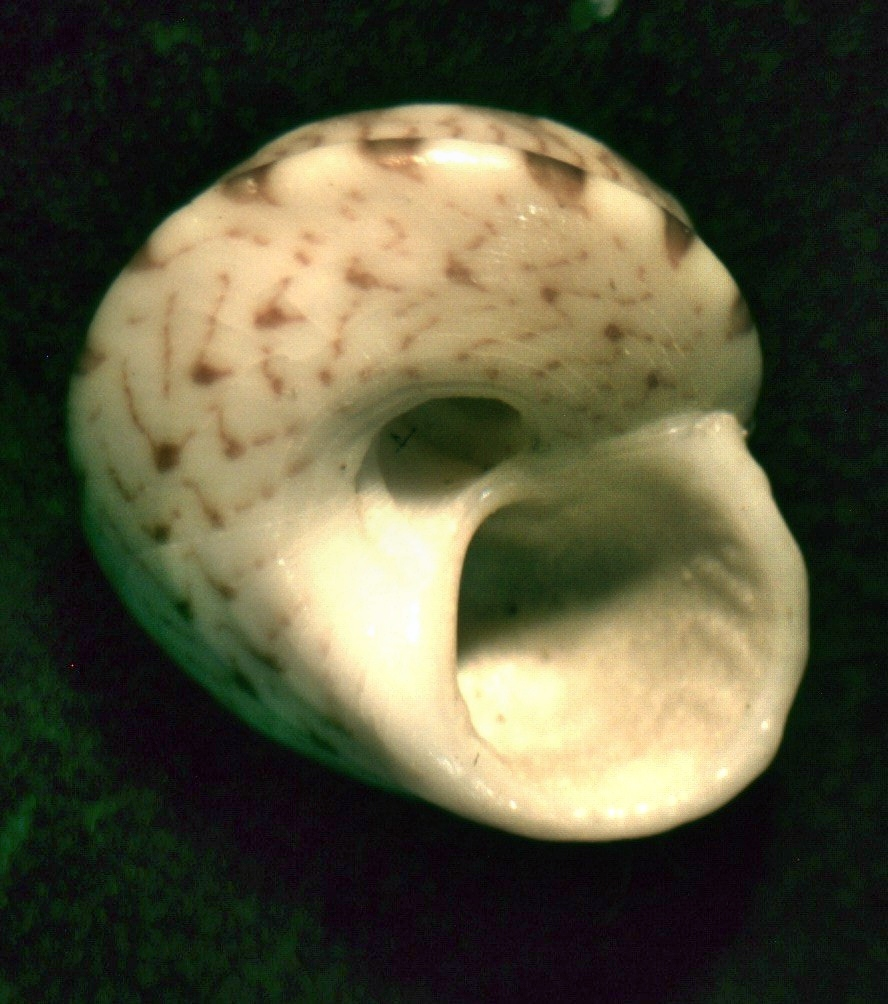
- Apertural view of a shell of Notogibbula bicarinata

Scientific classification
- Kingdom: Animalia
- Phylum: Mollusca
- Class: Gastropoda
- Subclass: Vetigastropoda
- Order: Trochida
- Superfamily: Trochoidea
- Family: Trochidae
- Genus: Notogibbula
- Species: N. bicarinata

Binomial name
- Notogibbula bicarinata (A. Adams, 1854)

Synonyms
- Trochus coxi Fischer, P. 1879.; Calliotrochus coxi Hedley, C. 1918; Gibbula bicarinata Adams, 1854 (basionym); Gibbula coxi Angas, 1867

= Notogibbula bicarinata =

Species of gastropod

Notogibbula bicarinata, common name "Cox's top shell", is a species of sea snail, a marine gastropod mollusc in the family Trochidae, the top shells.

== Description ==
The shell has an orbicularly conical shape and is moderately umbilicated. It is rather solid and smooth but not glossy. The height and width of the shell are almost equal, with a maximum width of 1 cm. The pink or fawn shell shows dark purple and brown markings with a pattern of zig-zag brown lines, and with a few broad pure white flames descending from the sutures and interrupted on the keels with brownish red. The five whorls have a strong shoulder and basal angulations. They contain two prominent rounded keels, one next the suture; slightly concave between the suture and upper keel, and a little concave between the keels, The whorls are finely spirally ridged and decussated with exceedingly fine and close oblique longitudinal lines. The sculpture of the shell shows microscopic spiral threads. The convex base of the shell is reticulated with gray and minutely spotted with red. It is finely concentrically ridged and decussated like the whorls, the ridges increasing in size toward the umbilicus. The white aperture is round and occupies about half the length of the shell. The parietal callus and the curved columella have both a smooth appearance. The white, narrow umbilicus goes deep into the shell.

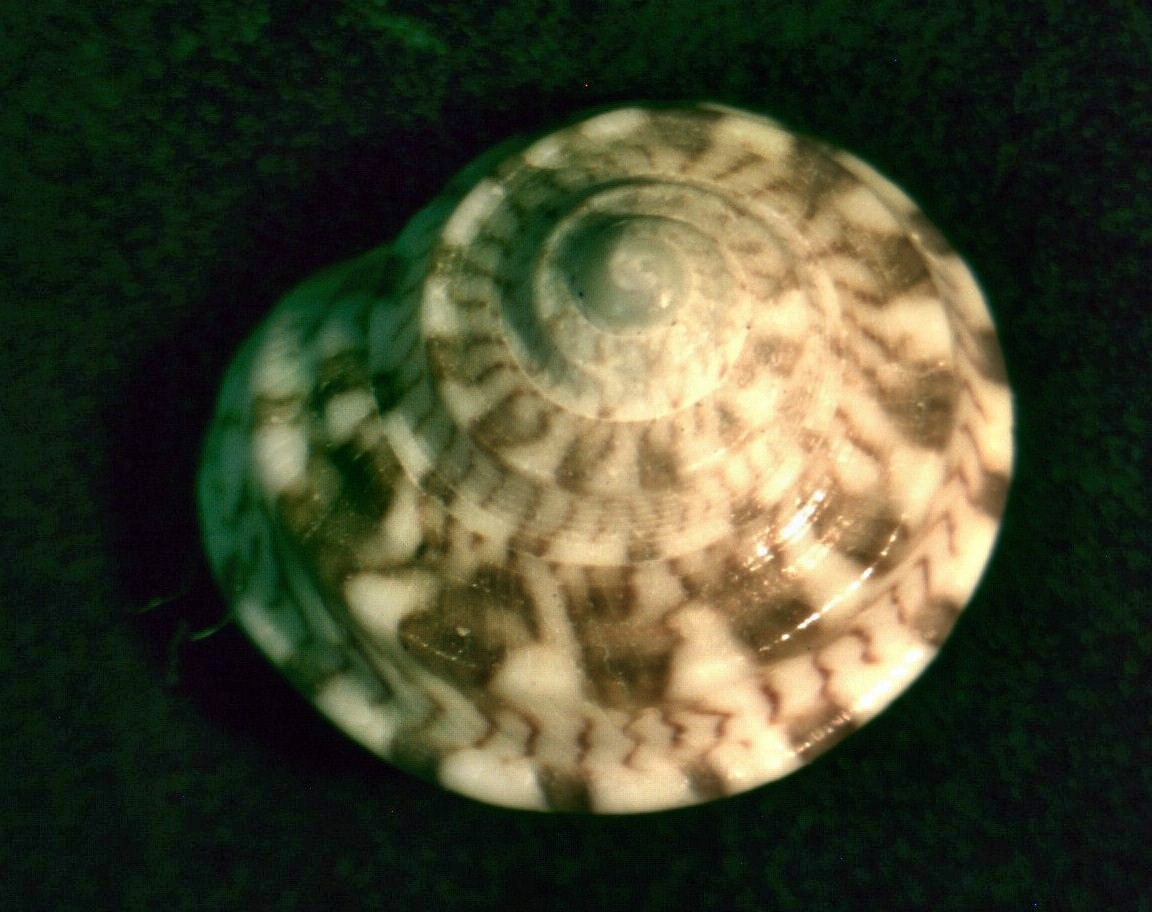
A shell of Notogibbula bicarinata, apical view

== Distribution ==
This species inhabits the shallow subtidal zone of sandy bays, among seaweed and seagrass along the coasts of southern Western Australia to New South Wales and Tasmania.
