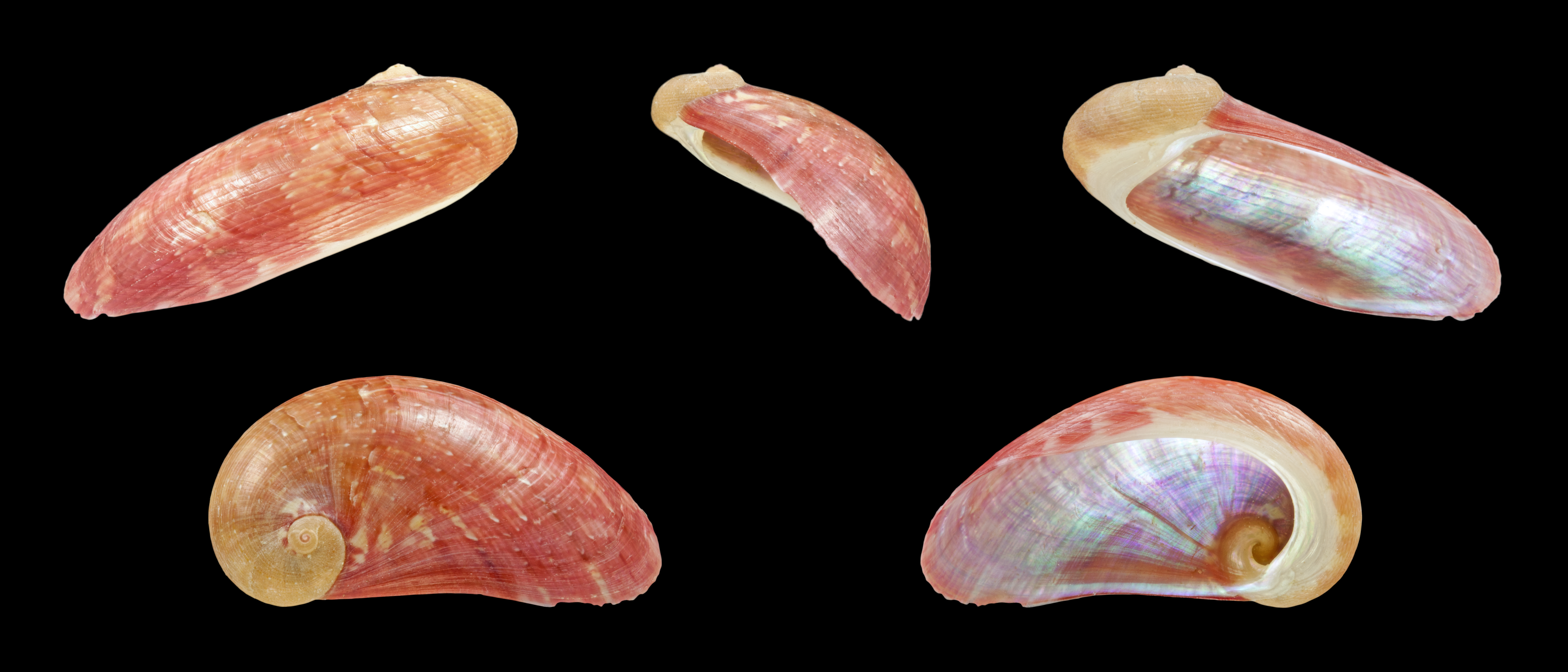
- A shell of Stomatella impertusa

Scientific classification
- Kingdom: Animalia
- Phylum: Mollusca
- Class: Gastropoda
- Subclass: Vetigastropoda
- Order: Trochida
- Superfamily: Trochoidea
- Family: Trochidae
- Genus: Stomatella
- Species: S. impertusa

Binomial name
- Stomatella impertusa (Burrow, 1815)

Synonyms
- Gena dilecta Gould, 1859; Gena lutea A. Adams, 1854; Gena varia Adams A. 1851; Haliotis impertusa Burrow, 1815 (original description); Plocamotis impertusa Iredale, T. & McMichael, D.F. 1962; Stomatella nigra Quoy, J.R.C. & J.P. Gaimard, 1834; Stomatella planulata Lamarck, 1827

= Stomatella impertusa =

Species of gastropod

Stomatella impertusa, common name the strigose stomatella or the elongate false ear shell, is a species of sea snail, a marine gastropod mollusk in the family Trochidae, the top snails.

== Description ==
The length of the shell varies between 5 mm and 25 mm. The small, thin shell has a lengthened oval shape. It is shining, yellowish-green, ornamented with white triangular spots with dark apices, sometimes in series. The shell is decussated by incremental and deeper spiral striae. The shell contains three whorls and a nearly terminal apex. The narrow aperture is oval, its ventral face nearly level. Inside it is shining and greenish. The shell is very delicate and slender, allied to Stomatella planulata, a much larger species, and Stomatella auricula,

== Distribution ==
This marine species occurs in the Southwest Pacific, off East India, the Philippines, Australia, Japan, in the Red Sea and as a casual find in the Mediterranean Sea.
