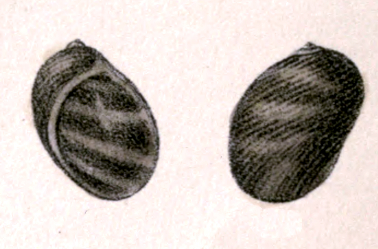
- Original drawing with two views of a shell of Synaptocochlea montrouzieri

Scientific classification
- Kingdom: Animalia
- Phylum: Mollusca
- Class: Gastropoda
- Subclass: Vetigastropoda
- Order: Trochida
- Family: Trochidae
- Subfamily: Fossarininae
- Genus: Synaptocochlea
- Species: S. montrouzieri

Binomial name
- Synaptocochlea montrouzieri (Pilsbry, 1890)

Synonyms
- Stomatella montrouzieri Pilsbry, 1890 (original combination); Stomatella picta Montrouzier in Souverbie & Montrouzier, 1862; Synaptocochlea picta (Montrouzier in Souverbie & Montrouzier, 1862)

= Synaptocochlea montrouzieri =

Species of gastropod

Synaptocochlea montrouzieri is a species of sea snail, a marine gastropod mollusk in the family Trochidae, the top snails.

== Description ==
The height of the shell attains 2½ mm, its largest diameter 4½ mm. The small shell has an ovate shape. Its back is convex. The shell is transversely striated. The striae are decussated by slightly elevated spiral striae, with smaller ones between them. Its color is deep opaque black, obliquely girdled with white. The spire is lateral and slightly prominent. The four whorls are separated by impressed sutures. They are rounded, the last forming the greater part of the shell. The ample aperture is rounded-ovate and somewhat dilated below. It is shining within, concolored with very translucent white bands. The right margin is acute. The left margin is subthickened, arcuate, reflexed posteriorly, and appressed. The umbilicus is no more than a very narrow fissure. The rounded operculum is corneous and very thin.

== Distribution ==
This marine species occurs off New Caledonia.
