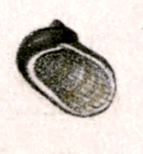
- Drawing of a shell of Synaptocochlea picta

Scientific classification
- Kingdom: Animalia
- Phylum: Mollusca
- Class: Gastropoda
- Subclass: Vetigastropoda
- Order: Trochida
- Family: Trochidae
- Subfamily: Fossarininae
- Genus: Synaptocochlea
- Species: S. picta

Binomial name
- Synaptocochlea picta (d'Orbigny, 1847)

Synonyms
- Gena asperulata A. Adams, 1850; Stomatella caliginosa H. & A. Adams, 1864; Stomatella picta d'Orbigny, 1847; Stomatia picta d'Orbigny, 1847 (basionym); Synaptocochlea inconcinna auct. non Pilsbry, 1921; Synaptocochlea lactea Usticke, 1959; Synaptocochlea nigrita Rehder, 1939

= Synaptocochlea picta =

Species of gastropod

Synaptocochlea picta, common name the painted false stomatella, is a species of sea snail, a marine gastropod mollusk in the family Trochidae, the top snails.

== Distribution ==
This species occurs in the Caribbean Sea, the Gulf of Mexico and the Lesser Antilles.

== Description ==
The maximum recorded shell length is 7 mm.

The imperforate, oblong, blackish shell is ear-shaped. The small spire is transversely lirate with the larger and smaller lirae alternating. It is obsoletely articulated with white. The oblong aperture is very oblique and greenish white within. The black margin is crenulate. The inner lip is rather flattened. There is a narrow lunar umbilical rimation. The thin operculum is orbicular and multispiral.

== Habitat ==
The minimum recorded depth for this species is 0 m; the maximum recorded depth is 713 m.
