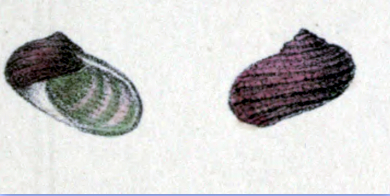
- Drawing showing two views of a shell of Stomatolina sanguinea

Scientific classification
- Kingdom: Animalia
- Phylum: Mollusca
- Class: Gastropoda
- Subclass: Vetigastropoda
- Order: Trochida
- Superfamily: Trochoidea
- Family: Trochidae
- Genus: Stomatolina
- Species: S. sanguinea

Binomial name
- Stomatolina sanguinea (A. Adams, 1850)

Synonyms
- Stomatia depressa Sowerby, 1874; Stomatella sanguinea A. Adams, 1850 (original combination)

= Stomatolina sanguinea =

Species of gastropod

Stomatolina sanguinea is a species of small sea snail, a marine gastropod mollusk in the family Trochidae, the top snails.

This is a taxon inquirendum

== Description ==
The size of the shell varies between 6 mm and 18 mm. The thin shell is depressed. It is deep crimson colored, with a crescent of white bordering the columella. The sculpture consists of rather narrow, spaced, acute spiral cords, of which there are two larger ones on the upper surface (one at the shoulder). The spaces between are occupied by intervening smaller spirals and very close, fine, microscopic spiral striae, decussated by finer radiating striae of increment. The upper whorls show low, radiating, scarcely visible folds. The base is nearly smooth, having only fine separated spiral threads with flat interspaces. All sculpture becomes obsolete in the white crescent except the fine, very oblique growth lines. The principal spirals of the upper surface are more or less distinctly beaded. The whorls of the spire show only two spiral carinae. The short spire is acute and contains 4½ whorls. The last are rapidly enlarging, descending toward the aperture. The oval aperture is extremely oblique, reddish, and scarcely iridescent.

This species may be known by the bright coral red color, or white with longitudinal stripes, usually broken into distinct squarish spots. The principal spirals above are granose. There is an astonishing amount of variation in degree of depression. The nacreous layer is excessively thin, especially in the typical form.

== Distribution ==
This marine species occurs off Japan and the Philippines.
