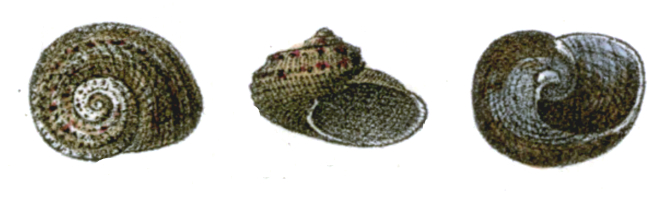
- Drawing with three views of a s shell of Stomatolina rubra

Scientific classification
- Kingdom: Animalia
- Phylum: Mollusca
- Class: Gastropoda
- Subclass: Vetigastropoda
- Order: Trochida
- Superfamily: Trochoidea
- Family: Trochidae
- Genus: Stomatolina
- Species: S. rubra

Binomial name
- Stomatolina rubra (Lamarck, 1822)

Synonyms
- Microtis rubra (Deshayes, 1843); Pseudostomatella rubra (Lamarck, 1822); Stomatia rubra Lamarck, 1822

= Stomatolina rubra =

Species of gastropod

Stomatolina rubra, common name the red stomatolina, is a species of small sea snail, a marine gastropod mollusk in the family Trochidae, the top snails.

== Description ==
The size of the shell varies between 8 mm and 18 mm. The depressed, rather thin shell has a small, conical spire. It is reddish brown, lighter beneath, or variously variegated. The surface is covered with close fine hair-like spiral striae, and with two low keels above the periphery, the upper one nodose. There is a series of short folds below the suture. The whorls of the spire contain a beaded carina. The wide body whorl is depressed, flattened above, convex below, and impressed at the axis. The large aperture is rounded, very oblique, and iridescent within.

== Distribution ==
This marine species occurs in the tropical Indo-West Pacific and off Korea, the Philippines and Australia (Northern Territory, Queensland, Western Australia)
