= Tres Cruces Formation =

Jurassic geological formation in Chile

- Stratigraphic range: Sinemurian-Pliensbachian, ~199–184 Ma
- Type: Geological formation
- Underlies: Algarrobal Formation
- Overlies: Tonalite basement
- Thickness: ~390 m (1,280 ft)

Lithology
- Primary: Sandstone, conglomerate, limestone
- Other: Mudstone

Location
- Region: Coquimbo Region
- Country: Chile

Type section
- Named for: Quebrada Tres Cruces
- Named by: Dediós, 1967

The Tres Cruces Formation is a sedimentary and fossiliferous geological formation that crops out across Paihuano in the Coquimbo Region of Chile. It dates back to the Early Jurassic period (Sinemurian through Pliensbachian stages). The lithology of the formation comprises clastic rocks, such as sandstone, conglomerate, and fossil-rich limestone, formed in marine settings. As such, the Tres Cruces Formation preserves a marine fossil record represented by brachiopods, molluscs (ammonites, bivalves, gastropods), and marine reptiles (ichthyosaurs). The formation is named after Quebrada Tres Cruces, whhich is an important fossiliferous locality.

== Paleobiota of the Tres Cruces Formation ==
=== Ammonites ===
| Genus | Species | Material | Locality | Unit | Notes | Images |
|---|---|---|---|---|---|---|
| Acanthopleuroceras | Indeterminate | Not specified. | Quebrada Dolores | | A polymorphitid ammonite. | |
| Amaltheus | Indeterminate | Not specified. | Quebrada Dolores | | A amaltheid ammonite. | |
| Arieticeras? | Indeterminate | Not specified. | Quebrada Tres Cruces | | A hildoceratid ammonite. | |
| Radstockiceras? | Indeterminate | Not specified. | Quebrada Dolores | | A oxynoticeratid ammonite. | |

=== Bivalves ===
| Genus | Species | Material | Locality | Unit | Notes | Images |
|---|---|---|---|---|---|---|
| Cardinia | Indeterminate | Not specified. | Quebrada Tres Cruces | | A cardiniid bivalve. | |
| Exogyra | Indeterminate | Not specified. | Quebrada Tres Cruces | | A gryphaeid bivalve. | |
| Gryphaea | Indeterminate | Not specified. | Quebrada Dolores | | A gryphaeid bivalve. | |
| Ostrea | Indeterminate | Not specified. | Quebrada Tres Cruces | | A ostreid bivalve. | |
| Panopea | Indeterminate | Not specified. | Quebrada Tres Cruces | | A hiatellid bivalve. | |
| Pholadomya | Indeterminate | Not specified. | Quebrada Tres Cruces | | A pholadomyid bivalve. | |
| Weyla | W. alata | Not specified. | Quebrada Tres Cruces, Quebrada Dolores, Quebrada Matahuaico | | A pectinid bivalve. | |

=== Brachiopods ===
| Genus | Species | Material | Locality | Unit | Notes | Images |
|---|---|---|---|---|---|---|
| Spiriferina | S. rostrata | Not specified. | Quebrada Tres Cruces, Quebrada Dolores | | A spiriferinid brachiopod. | |
| Terebratula | Indeterminate | Not specified. | Quebrada Dolores | | A terebratulid brachiopod. | |
| Zeilleria | Indeterminate | Not specified. | Quebrada Tres Cruces | | A zeilleriid brachiopod. | |

=== Gastropods ===
| Genus | Species | Material | Locality | Unit | Notes | Images |
|---|---|---|---|---|---|---|
| Lithotrochus | L. humboldtii | Not specified. | Quebrada Tres Cruces, Quebrada Dolores | | A trochid gastropod. | |
| Nerinea | Indeterminate | Not specified. | Quebrada Tres Cruces | | A nerineid gastropod. | |
| Pleurotomaria | Indeterminate | Not specified. | Quebrada Tres Cruces | | A pleurotomariid gastropod. | |

=== Ichthyosaurs ===
| Genus | Species | Material | Locality | Unit | Notes | Images |
|---|---|---|---|---|---|---|
| Ichthyosauria indet. | Indeterminate | Twelve vertebrae centra. | Quebrada Tres Cruces | | An ichthyosaur. | |

== See also ==
- Lautaro Formation
