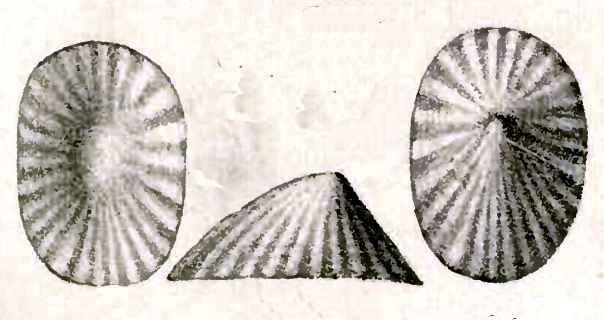
- Drawing with three views of a shell of Broderipia eximia

Scientific classification
- Kingdom: Animalia
- Phylum: Mollusca
- Class: Gastropoda
- Subclass: Vetigastropoda
- Order: Trochida
- Family: Trochidae
- Subfamily: Fossarininae
- Genus: Broderipia
- Species: B. eximia

Binomial name
- Broderipia eximia G. & H. Nevill, 1869

= Broderipia eximia =

Species of gastropod

Broderipia eximia is a species of sea snail, a marine gastropod mollusk in the family Trochidae, the top snails.

== Description ==
The height of the shell attains 10 mm, its diameter 7 mm. This marine species (just as Broderipia nitidissima Deshayes, 1863) is more conical with a limpet-like form. The apex nearer the middle than the edge and a little curved upward. The elevated shell is patella-shaped, oblong-oval in outline, elevated. The profile from the apex to the posterior margin is straight or a little concave, from the apex to the anterior end it is a little convex. The surface is radiately ribbed, with shorter riblets inserted between the principal ones toward the periphery. The color is whitish, more or less marbled with blackish brown. The anterior of the shell shows a small central, opaque, white callus, the rest is brilliantly pearly and opalescent.

== Distribution ==
This marine shell occurs off southern Sri Lanka.
