= Minopa =

Scientific classification
- Kingdom: Animalia
- Phylum: Mollusca
- Class: Gastropoda
- Subclass: Vetigastropoda
- Order: Trochida
- Family: Trochidae
- Subfamily: Fossarininae
- Genus: Minopa; Iredale, 1924

Synonyms
- Fossarina (Minopa) Iredale, 1924

Genus of gastropods

Minopa is a genus of sea snails, marine gastropod mollusks in the family Trochidae, the top snails.

== Distribution ==
The species in this marine genus are endemic to Australia and occur off New South Wales, South Australia, Tasmania, Victoria and Western Australia.

== Species ==
- Minopa legrandi Petterd, W.F., 1879: synonym of Fossarina legrandi Petterd, 1879
- Minopa reedi (Verco, J.C., 1907): synonym of Fossarina reedi (Verco, 1907)
