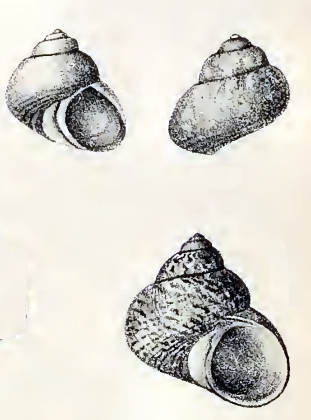
- Drawing with three views of a shell of Calliotrochus marmoreus

Scientific classification
- Kingdom: Animalia
- Phylum: Mollusca
- Class: Gastropoda
- Subclass: Vetigastropoda
- Order: Trochida
- Family: Trochidae
- Subfamily: Stomatellinae
- Genus: Calliotrochus; P. Fischer, 1879

Type species
- Turbo phasianellus Deshayes, G.P., 1863

Synonyms
- Gibbula (Calliotrochus) Fischer, 1880; Trochinella Iredale, 1937

= Calliotrochus =

Genus of gastropods

Calliotrochus is a genus of sea snails, marine gastropod mollusks in the subfamily Stomatellinae of the family Trochidae, the top snails.

== Description ==
This genus consists of thin, small, shining globose species with a turbinate shape. It has rounded, smooth or spirally striate, convex whorls. The aperture is rounded. The outer lip and columella are simple, thin and arcuate. The umbilicus is narrow.

== Species ==
Species within the genus Calliotrochus include:

- Calliotrochus marmoreus (Pease, 1861)

The following species were brought into synonymy:

- Calliotrochus excellens Iredale, 1937: synonym of Calliotrochus marmoreus (Pease, 1861)
- Calliotrochus legrandi May, W.L. 1921: synonym of Minopa legrandi (Petterd, 1879)
- Calliotrochus normalis Iredale, 1937: synonym of Calliotrochus marmoreus (Pease, 1861)
- Calliotrochus symbolicus Iredale, 1937: synonym of Calliotrochus marmoreus (Pease, 1861)
- Calliotrochus tasmanicus May, W.L. 1923: synonym of Nanula tasmanica (Petterd, 1879)
