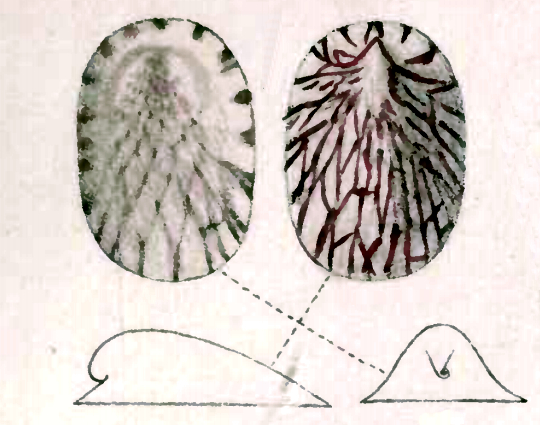
- Drawing with four views of a shell of Broderipia subiridescens

Scientific classification
- Kingdom: Animalia
- Phylum: Mollusca
- Class: Gastropoda
- Subclass: Vetigastropoda
- Order: Trochida
- Family: Trochidae
- Genus: Broderipia
- Species: B. subiridescens

Binomial name
- Broderipia subiridescens Pilsbry, 1890

= Broderipia subiridescens =

Species of gastropod

Broderipia subiridescens is a species of sea snail, a marine gastropod mollusk in the family Trochidae, the top snails.

== Description ==
The height of the shell attains 6 mm, its diameter 4 mm. The shell is limpet-shaped. Its outline is oval. The apex nearly attains the posterior margin. In profile the posterior slope is very short and concave; the anterior is long and convex. It is highest near the apex. The surface of the shell is nearly smooth, with microscopic concentric growth lines. Its color is white, covered with a netted pattern of dots connected by lines of red. The minute apex is recumbent, spiral, and dextral. The tip is eroded. The inside is scarcely nacreous, the color pattern showing through.

This is a shell smaller than Broderipia iridescens, and more convex. The apex is nearer the posterior margin. The interior is scarcely pearly. The coloration and lack of granulation distinguish it from Broderipia cumingii.

== Distribution ==
This species occurs in the Indian Ocean off Madagascar (doubtful).
