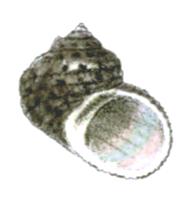
- Drawing with an apertural view of a shell of Pseudostomatella clathratula

Scientific classification
- Kingdom: Animalia
- Phylum: Mollusca
- Class: Gastropoda
- Subclass: Vetigastropoda
- Order: Trochida
- Family: Trochidae
- Subfamily: Stomatellinae
- Genus: Pseudostomatella
- Species: P. clathratula

Binomial name
- Pseudostomatella clathratula (A. Adams in H. Adams & A. Adams, 1854)

Synonyms
- Stomatella clathratula A. Adams in H. & A. Adams, 1854

= Pseudostomatella clathratula =

Species of gastropod

Pseudostomatella clathratula is a species of small sea snail, a marine gastropod mollusk in the family Trochidae, the top snails.

== Description ==
The imperforate shell has a turbinate-depressed shape. Its spire is a little elevated. The convex whorls are transversely lirate, articulated with red, and crenulated. The interstices are closely latticed. The umbilical region is impressed. The thick columella is reflexed. The aperture is moderate, rounded and pearly within.

== Distribution ==
This marine species is endemic to Australia and occurs off Western Australia in the Northwest Shelf Province.
