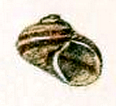
- Original drawing of a shell of Fossarina picta

Scientific classification
- Kingdom: Animalia
- Phylum: Mollusca
- Class: Gastropoda
- Subclass: Vetigastropoda
- Order: Trochida
- Family: Trochidae
- Genus: Fossarina
- Species: F. picta

Binomial name
- Fossarina picta A. Adams, 1864

= Fossarina picta =

Species of sea snail

Fossarina picta is a species of very small sea snail, a marine gastropod mollusc or micromollusk in the family Trochidae, known as the top snails.

== Description ==
The shell grows to a length of 4 mm. The shell is depressed and turbinate, bearing a strong resemblance to Fossarina patula, though its spiral lirae are uniform and straightforward. The shell comprises four convex whorls, with a particularly sizable body whorl sporting a rounded margin. The lips are sharp and arcuate, while the aperture takes on a near-circular shape. The overall shell outline leans toward being more orbicular. Irregular purple-black radiating blotches are present on the shell, and the umbilical region typically displays a pale yellow hue.

== Distribution ==
This marine species occurs off the coat of South Korea and Japan.
