= Lautaro Formation =

Jurassic geological formation in Chile

- Stratigraphic range: Toarcian–Aalenian, ~184–170 Ma
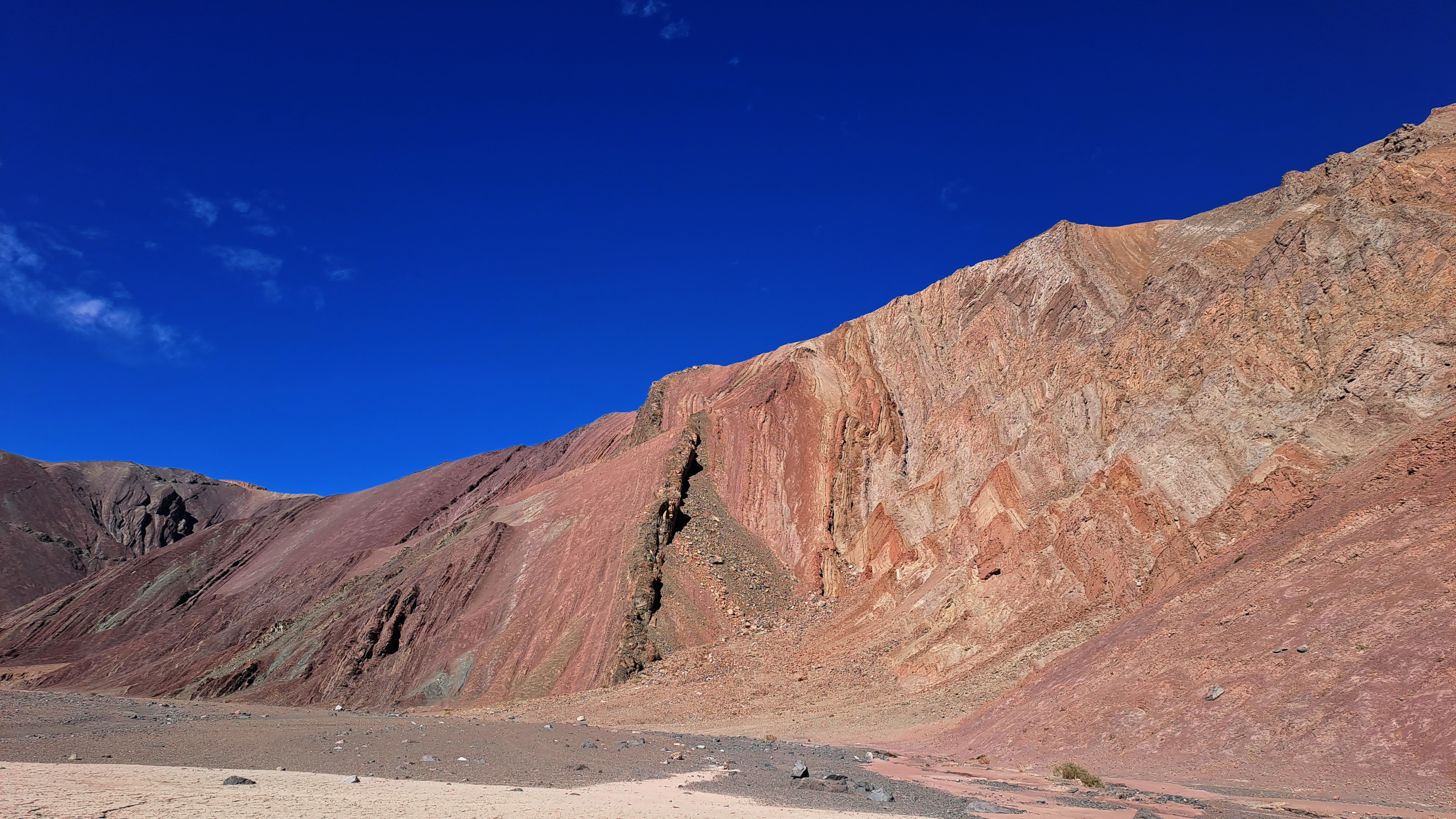
- Strata of the Lautaro Formation outcropping at La Puerta locality
- Type: Geological formation
- Underlies: Quebrada Monardes Formation
- Overlies: La Ternera Formation
- Thickness: ~2,600 m (8,500 ft)

Lithology
- Primary: Limestone
- Other: Sandstone

Location
- Region: Atacama Region
- Country: Chile
- Extent: Lautaro Basin

Type section
- Named for: Lautaro

The Lautaro Formation is sedimentary and fossiliferous geological formation that largely crops out near Copiapó (Atacama Region), Chile. It is dated back to the Jurassic period (Toarcian through Aalenian stages). The lithology of the formation comprises limestone and sandstone, formed in marine settings. The Lautaro Formation preserves a marine fossil record, representing molluscs (bivalves, gastropods) and marine reptiles (metriorhynchids, plesiosaurs).

The strata of the Lautaro Formation and its basin of deposition (the Lautaro Basin) have been subject to intense tectonic movement during the Mesozoic, producing large-scale stratigraphic discontinuity and tectonic inversion.

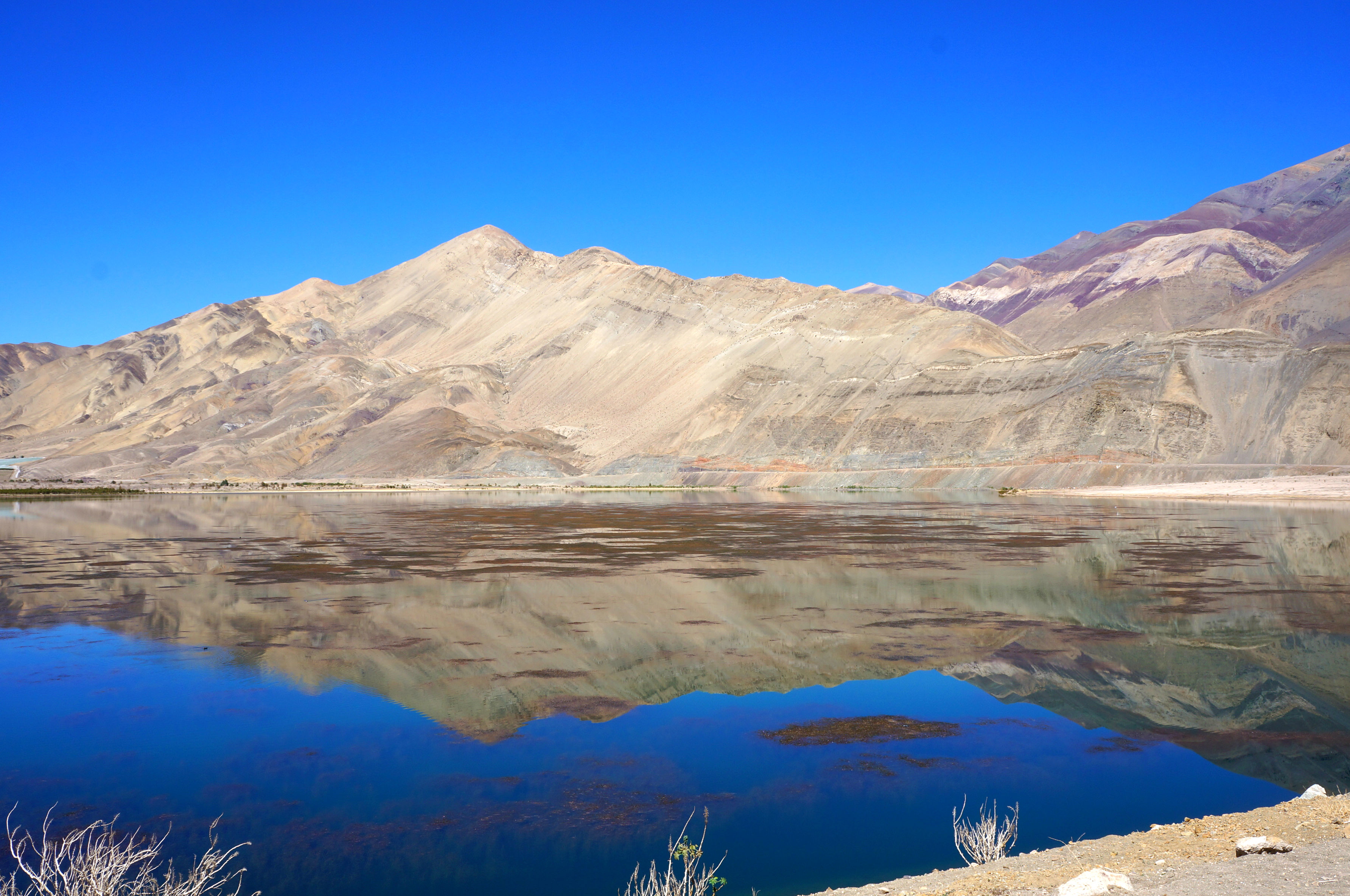
Strata of the Lautaro Formation exposed at the Tranque Lautaro

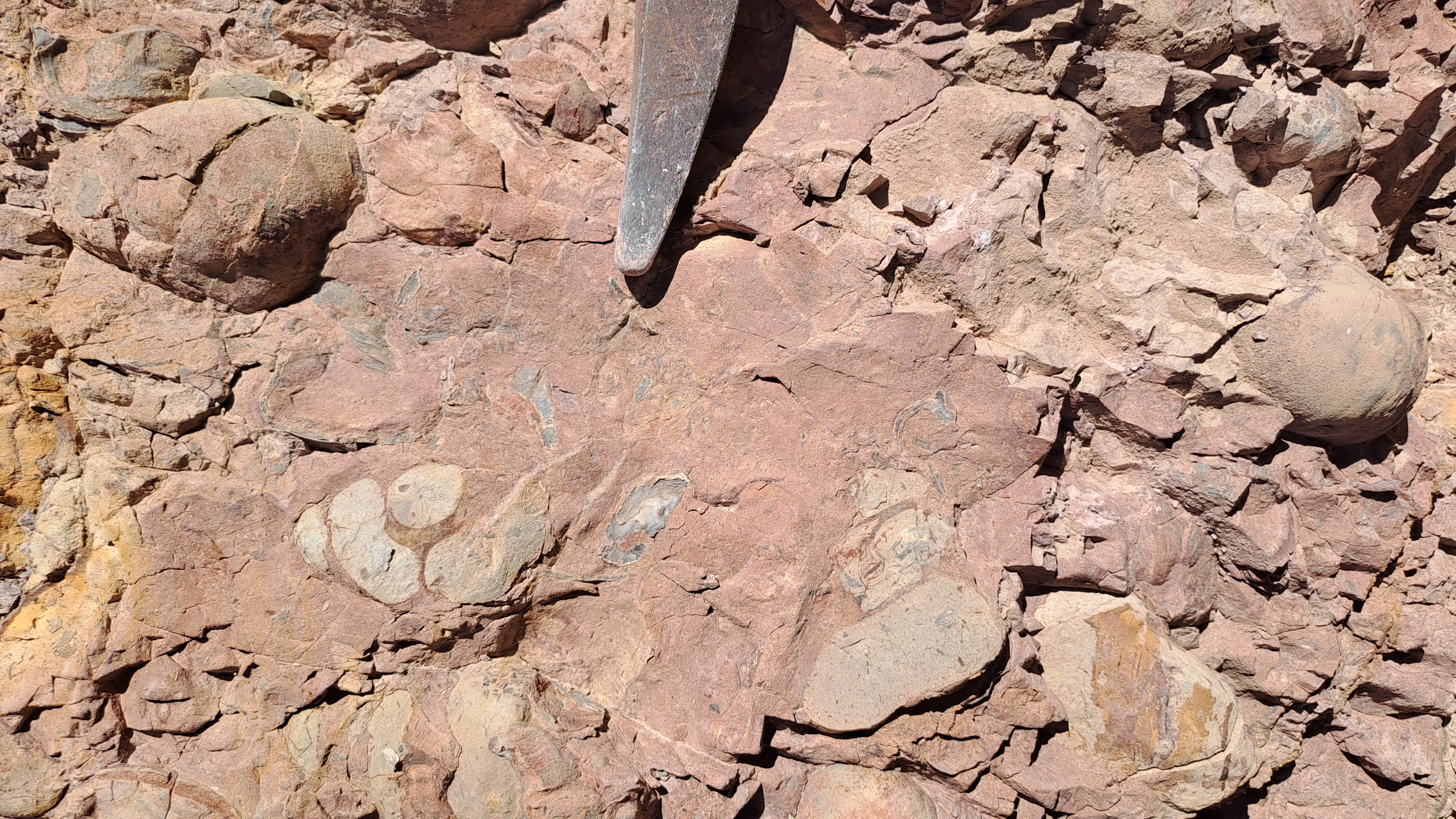
Fossils of Gryphaea and Lithotrochus at La Puerta

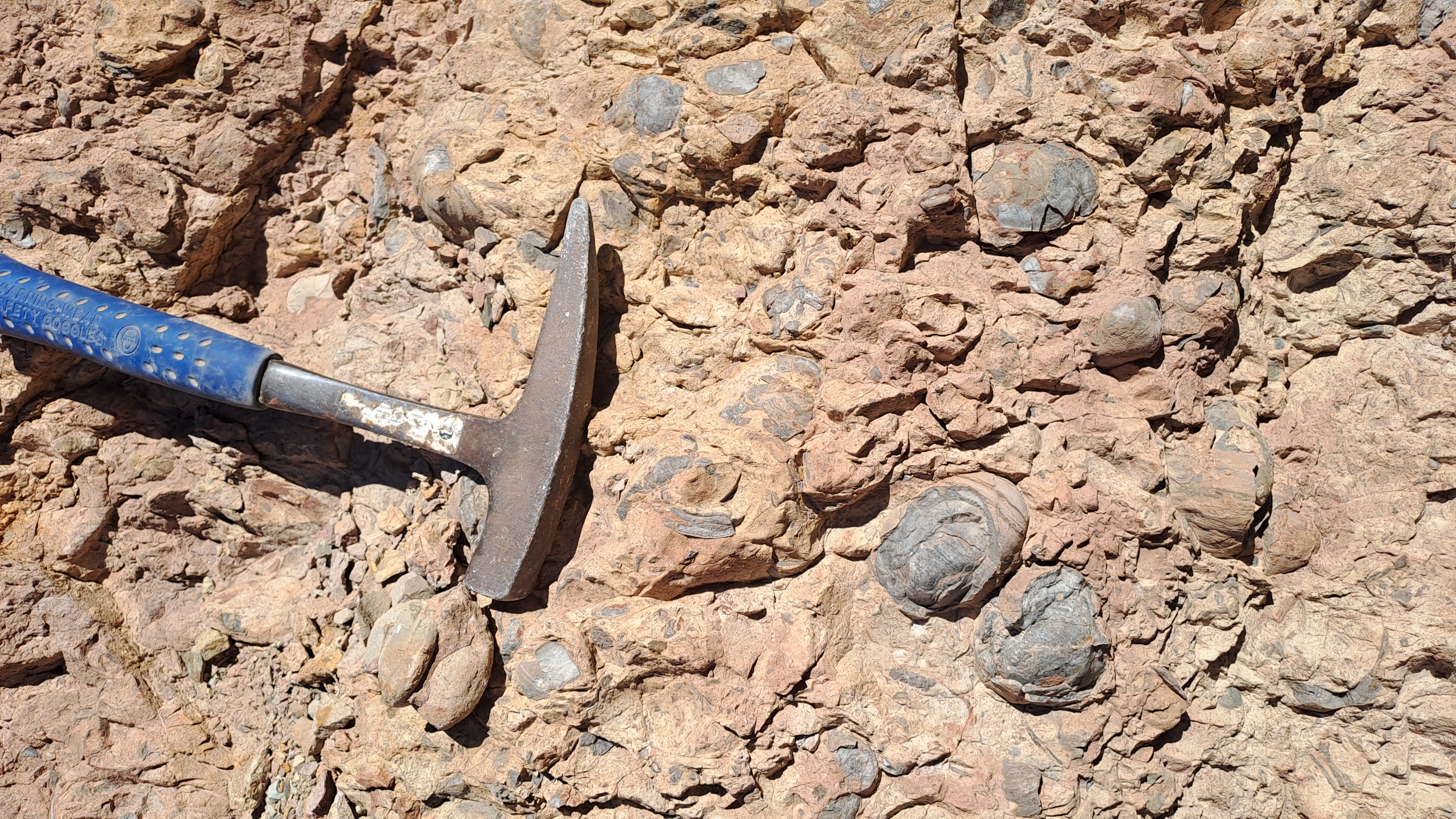
Fossils of Gryphaea at La Puerta

== Paleobiota of the Lautaro Formation ==
=== Ammonites ===
Genus	Species	Material	Locality	Unit	Notes	Images
Arieticeras	Indeterminate	Not specified.	Tranque Lautaro		A hildoceratid ammonite.	
Oxynoticeras	O. oxynotum	Not specified.	Tranque Lautaro		An oxynoticeratid ammonite.	

=== Bivalves ===
Genus	Species	Material	Locality	Unit	Notes	Images
Gryphaea	G. darwini	Partial and complete shells.	La Puerta, Tranque Lautaro		A gryphaeid bivalve.	
Weyla	W. alata	Partial and complete shells.	La Puerta, Tranque Lautaro		A pectinid bivalve.	

=== Brachiopods ===
Genus	Species	Material	Locality	Unit	Notes	Images
Rhynchonella	R. variabilis	Not specified.	Tranque Lautaro		A rhynchonellid brachiopod.	

=== Crocodyliformes ===
Genus	Species	Material	Locality	Unit	Notes	Images
Metriorhynchus	Indeterminate	Partial skull.	Quebrada La Iglesia	Upper part	A metriorhynchid.	

=== Gastropods ===
Genus	Species	Material	Locality	Unit	Notes	Images
Lithotrochus	L. humboldtii	Partial and complete shells.	La Puerta, Tranque Lautaro		A trochid gastropod.	

=== Plesiosaurs ===
Genus	Species	Material	Locality	Unit	Notes	Images
Plesiosauria indet.	Indeterminate	Three vertebrae.	Quebrada La Iglesia	Upper part	A plesiosaur.	

== See also ==
- Pan de Azúcar Formation
