= Pseudostomatella cycloradiata =

Scientific classification
- Kingdom: Animalia
- Phylum: Mollusca
- Class: Gastropoda
- Subclass: Vetigastropoda
- Order: Trochida
- Family: Trochidae
- Subfamily: Stomatellinae
- Genus: Pseudostomatella
- Species: P. cycloradiata

Binomial name
- Pseudostomatella cycloradiata Nowell-Usticke, 1959

Synonyms
- Pseudostomatella erythrocoma var. cycloradiata Usticke, 1959

Species of gastropod

Pseudostomatella cycloradiata is a species of sea snail, a marine gastropod mollusk in the family Trochidae, the top snails.

== Description ==
The maximum reported size of the shell is 5 mm.

== Distribution ==
This marine species occurs off the Lesser Antilles (Virgin Islands: St. Croix; Antigua).
