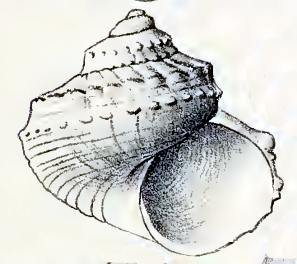
- Drawing with an apertural view of a shell of Pseudostomatella erythrocoma

Scientific classification
- Kingdom: Animalia
- Phylum: Mollusca
- Class: Gastropoda
- Subclass: Vetigastropoda
- Order: Trochida
- Family: Trochidae
- Subfamily: Stomatellinae
- Genus: Pseudostomatella
- Species: P. erythrocoma

Binomial name
- Pseudostomatella erythrocoma (Dall, 1889)

Synonyms
- Margarita eythrocoma Dall, 1889

= Pseudostomatella erythrocoma =

Species of gastropod

Pseudostomatella erythrocoma is a species of very small sea snail, a marine gastropod mollusk or micromollusk in the family Trochidae, the top snails.

== Distribution ==
This species occurs in the Gulf of Mexico, the Caribbean Sea and off the Lesser Antilles.

== Description ==
The maximum recorded shell length is 6.5 mm (0.26 in). The small shell is depressed and conic. Its colour is yellowish, variegated and articulated with rose-pink and opaque white. The four to five whorls are rounded. The minute nucleus is smooth. The whorls are generally a little carinated on the upper surface, especially the earlier whorls, by one or two prominent spiral riblets. Below they are full and rounded, with a small but well-marked umbilicus. The radiating sculpture of the lines of growth is occasionally irregular so as to form faint waves, but usually inconspicuous. The spiral sculpture consists of fine close little-raised threads, with on the upper surface one and on the periphery another stronger thread or carination, seldom nodulous, and stronger on the earlier whorls. The spirals are usually articulated with rose-red and opaque white or greenish-yellow. The base is rounded and finely spirally threaded. The umbilicus is not carinated nor marked by special sculpture. The aperture rounded and oblique. Its margins are a little angulated above, thin, simple, and joined by a thin layer of callus on the body.

== Habitat ==
The minimum recorded depth for this species is 0 m (0 ft); the maximum recorded depth is 99 m (325 ft).
