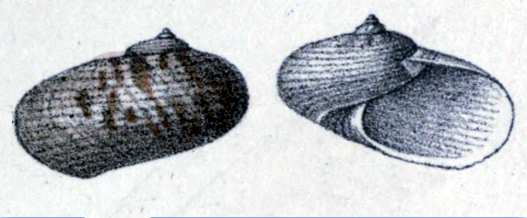
- Drawing with two views of a shell of Pseudostomatella decolorata

Scientific classification
- Kingdom: Animalia
- Phylum: Mollusca
- Class: Gastropoda
- Subclass: Vetigastropoda
- Order: Trochida
- Family: Trochidae
- Subfamily: Stomatellinae
- Genus: Pseudostomatella
- Species: P. decolorata

Binomial name
- Pseudostomatella decolorata (Gould, 1848)

Synonyms
- Stomatella decolorata Gould, 1848 (original combination)

= Pseudostomatella decolorata =

Species of gastropod

Pseudostomatella decolorata, common name the coloured stomatella, is a species of sea snail, a marine gastropod mollusk in the family Trochidae, the top snails.

== Description ==
The size of the shell varies between 11 mm and 20 mm. The depressed shell is ear-shaped and rather rounded in outline. It is dead white above, with spots of milk-white and blotches of pale sanguineous especially near the suture. The four whorls form an acute, moderately elevated spire, somewhat crenulated at the sutures. The surface is conspicuously grooved, those above the periphery having 3 or 4 smaller striae intervening. Beneath it is somewhat imbricated upwards, and barred in the intervals by the lines of growth, which do not pass over the ridges. One-half the breadth of the base adjoining the columella is plain, without striae, and banded by a raised and milk-white line. There is a slight reflection of the columella against a minute perforation. The transverse aperture is rounded-oval and nearly circular. Its interior is porcelain-white and shining.

== Distribution ==
This marine species occurs in the Central Pacific and off Japan and North Australia
