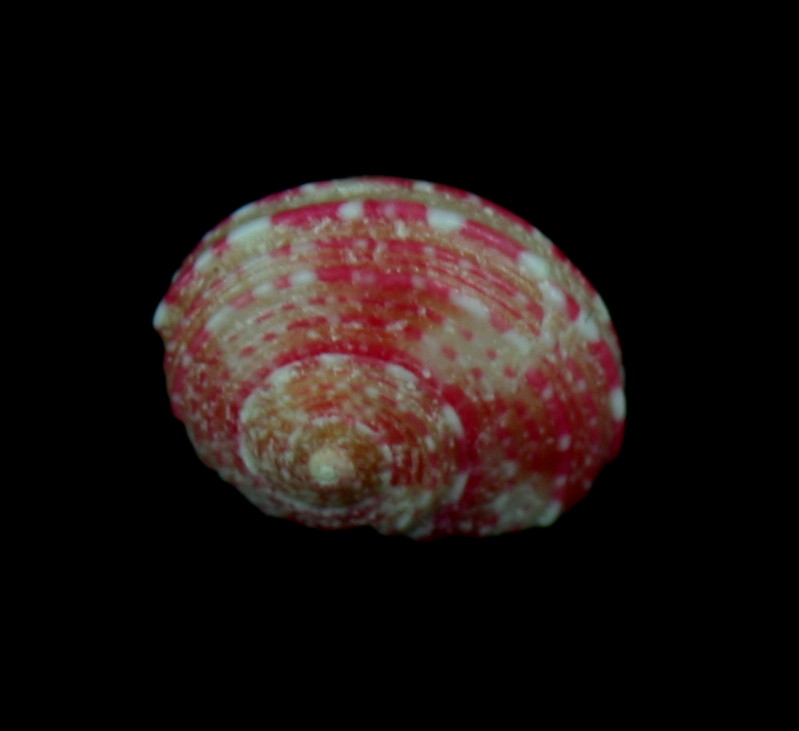
- Shell of Pseudostomatella coccinea (A. Adams, 1850), measuring 4.2 mm height by 7.6 mm diameter, collected at low tide in beach drift at Great Stirrup Cay, in the Bahamas.

Scientific classification
- Kingdom: Animalia
- Phylum: Mollusca
- Class: Gastropoda
- Subclass: Vetigastropoda
- Order: Trochida
- Family: Trochidae
- Subfamily: Stomatellinae
- Genus: Pseudostomatella
- Species: P. coccinea

Binomial name
- Pseudostomatella coccinea (A. Adams, 1850)

Synonyms
- Stomatella coccinea A. Adams, 1850

= Pseudostomatella coccinea =

Species of gastropod

Pseudostomatella coccinea is a species of small sea snail, a marine gastropod mollusk in the family Trochidae, the top snails.

== Description ==
The height of the shell attains 6.5 mm. The small, depressed shell is perforated and has a short, conical spire. It is deep crimson with a white umbilical crescent, and often white spots at the periphery. The surface is slightly shining, encircled by numerous raised spirals, of which every 4th one is larger. Midway between these are smaller ones, and there are still finer spiral striae occupying the interstices. The whole is decussated by fine striae of growth. There is an angle or carina midway between the periphery and suture of the body whorl, which angulates the spire whorls. The short spire is conic. The suture is impressed. The shell contains four whorls. The white apex is smooth. The last whorl is rapidly enlarging, subangular at periphery. The oblique aperture is red within. The inner lip is gently curved, narrowly reflexed over but not concealing the umbilical chink. The umbilical tract is white and impressed. The color of the shell is deep crimson, under a lens seen to be minutely, closely articulated with lighter, especially on the spire, and often with a series of white dots scattered along the periphery.

This is a very distinct coral-red species, with a white-tipped apex and a white umbilical crescent.

== Distribution ==
This marine species occurs in the Gulf of Mexico, the Caribbean Sea and off the Lesser Antilles.
