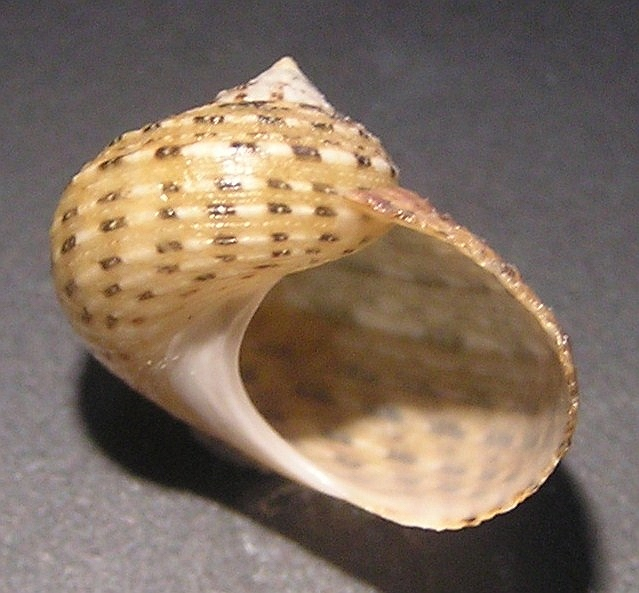
- Apertural view of a shell of Pseudostomatella martini

Scientific classification
- Kingdom: Animalia
- Phylum: Mollusca
- Class: Gastropoda
- Subclass: Vetigastropoda
- Order: Trochida
- Family: Trochidae
- Subfamily: Stomatellinae
- Genus: Pseudostomatella
- Species: P. martini

Binomial name
- Pseudostomatella martini Poppe, Tagaro & Dekker, 2006

= Pseudostomatella martini =

Species of gastropod

Pseudostomatella martini is a species of small sea snail, a marine gastropod mollusk in the family Trochidae, the top snails.

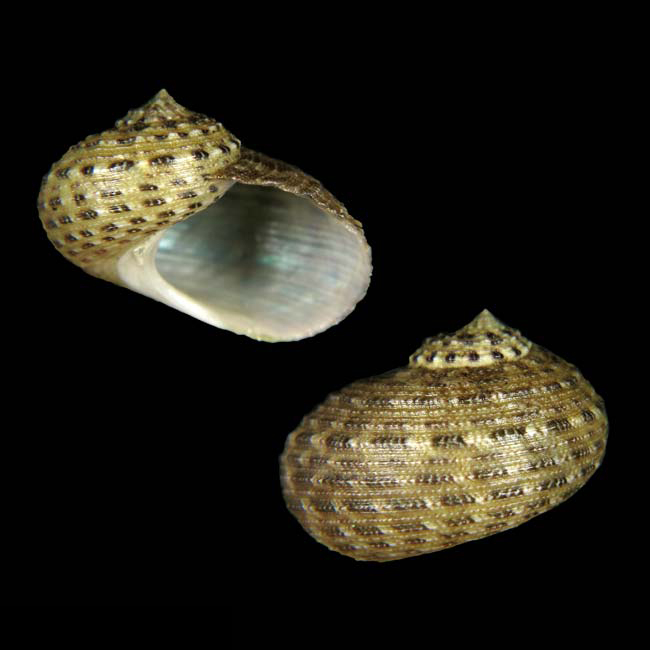
Seashell Pseudostomatella martini

== Description ==
The shell size varies between 5 mm and 20 mm.

== Distribution ==
This species occurs in the ocean around the Philippines.
