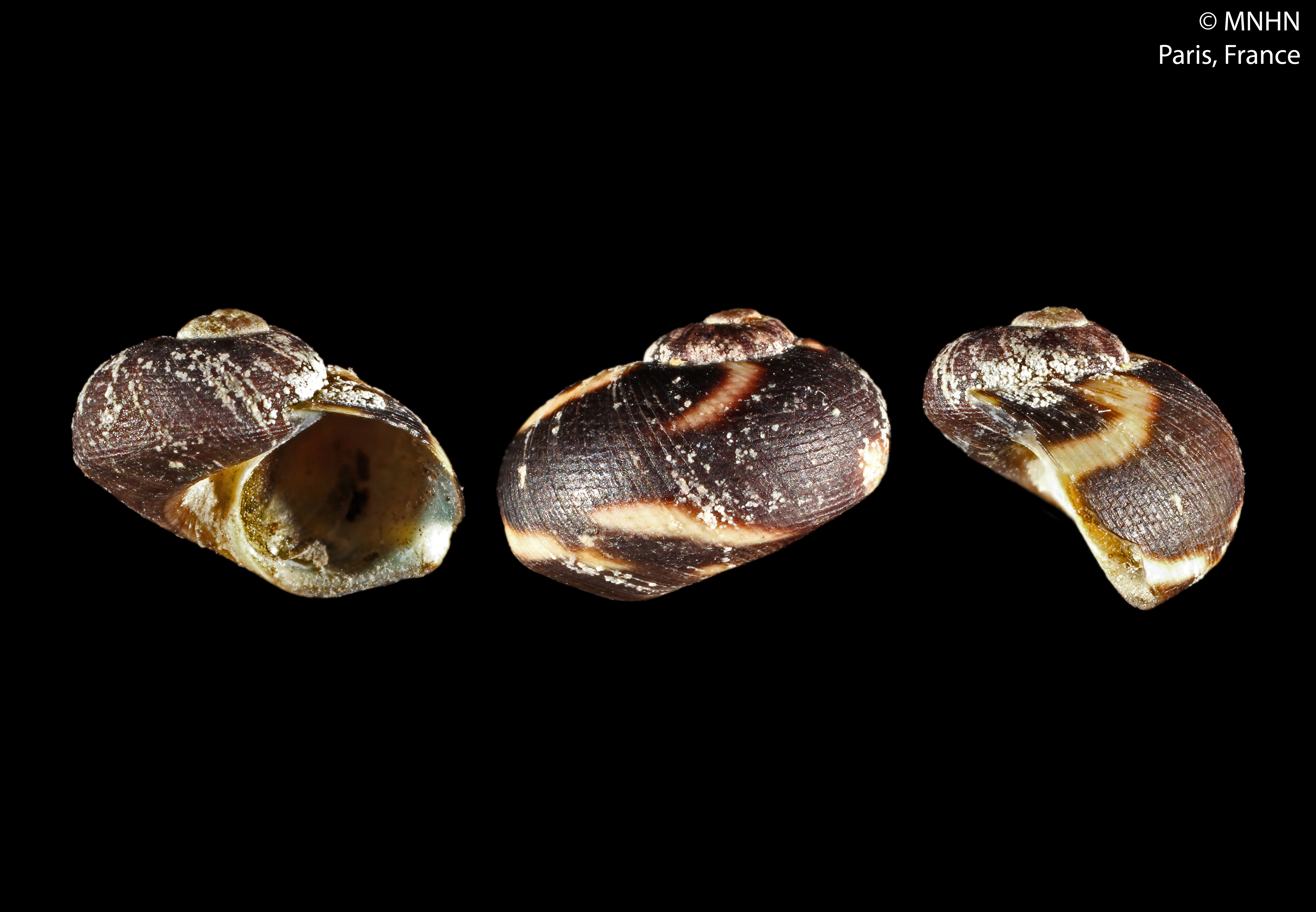
- Shell of Fossarina petterdi

Scientific classification
- Kingdom: Animalia
- Phylum: Mollusca
- Class: Gastropoda
- Subclass: Vetigastropoda
- Order: Trochida
- Family: Trochidae
- Subfamily: Fossarininae
- Genus: Fossarina; A. Adams & Angas, 1864

Type species
- Fossarina patula Adams, A. & G.F. Angas, 1863

Synonyms
- Minos Hutton, 1884

= Fossarina =

Genus of gastropods

Fossarina is a genus of sea snails, marine gastropod molluscs in the family Trochidae, the top shells.

The genus Fossarina was moved from the family Fossariidae to the newly created subfamily Fossarininae within the family Trochidae by Williams et al. in 2010.

== Description ==
The shell is auriform, a little depressed and narrowly umbilicated. The spire is short. The oval aperture is oblique. The lips are rounded. The operculum is multispiral.

== Distribution ==
This marine genus occurs off Australia, Tasmania and New Zealand; in the East China Sea.

== Species ==
Species within the genus Fossarina include:

- Fossarina legrandi Petterd, 1879
- Fossarina patula A. Adams & Angas, 1863
- Fossarina petterdi Crosse, 1870
- Fossarina picta A. Adams, 1867
- Fossarina reedi (Verco, 1907)
- Fossarina rimata (Hutton, 1884)

The Indo-Pacific Molluscan Database also mentions the following species:

- Fossarina mariei (P. Fischer, 1890)
- Fossarina variegata (A. Adams, 1855)

Species brought into synonymy

- Fossarina brazieri Angas, 1871: synonym of Fossarina patula A. Adams & Angas, 1863
- Fossarina funiculata Tenison-Woods, 1880: synonym of Fossarina patula A. Adams & Angas, 1863
- Fossarina hoffmeisteri Ladd, 1966: synonym of Calliotrochus marmoreus (Pease, 1861)
- Fossarina mutabilis May W.L., 1909: synonym of Risellopsis mutabilis May, 1909
- Fossarina reedi (Verco, 1907): synonym of Minopa reedi (Verco, 1907)
- Fossarina simpsoni Tenison-Woods, 1876: synonym of Fossarina petterdi Crosse, 1870
