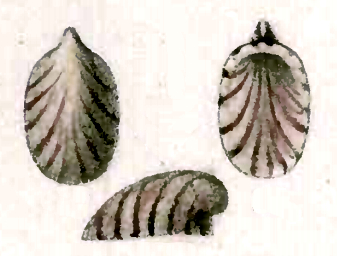
- Drawing with three views of a shell of Broderipia rosea

Scientific classification
- Kingdom: Animalia
- Phylum: Mollusca
- Class: Gastropoda
- Subclass: Vetigastropoda
- Order: Trochida
- Family: Trochidae
- Subfamily: Fossarininae
- Genus: Broderipia
- Species: B. rosea

Binomial name
- Broderipia rosea (Broderip, 1834)

Synonyms
- Scutella rosea Broderip, 1834

= Broderipia rosea =

Species of gastropod

Broderipia rosea is a species of sea snail, a marine gastropod mollusk in the family Trochidae, the top snails.

== Description ==
The height of the shell attains 4.3 mm, its diameter 2.5 mm. The shell is limpet-like, but with a recurved beak projecting beyond the posterior outline of the aperture. The shell is very convex, sloping convexly toward the front margin. The surface of the shell is lusterless, showing under a lens rather rude concentric growth lines, and very numerous, close, fine striae, radiating from the apex to the margins. The coloration consists of narrow red stripes obliquely descending from the median line to the borders, forming a series of V-shaped markings. The beak is rolled forward and a trifle inclined laterally, but the (dextral) apical whorl is lost. The aperture is oval. Its posterior margin is scarcely expanded. Its cavity is deep, scarcely perceptibly and nacreous.

== Distribution ==
This species occurs in the Red Sea, the Indian Ocean and in the Pacific Ocean; off the Cocos Keeling Islands; off Sri Lanka
