= Pseudostomatella orbiculata =

Scientific classification
- Kingdom: Animalia
- Phylum: Mollusca
- Class: Gastropoda
- Subclass: Vetigastropoda
- Order: Trochida
- Family: Trochidae
- Subfamily: Stomatellinae
- Genus: Pseudostomatella
- Species: P. orbiculata

Binomial name
- Pseudostomatella orbiculata (A. Adams, 1850)

Synonyms
- Stomatella orbiculata A. Adams, 1850

Species of gastropod

Pseudostomatella orbiculata is a species of sea snail, a marine gastropod mollusk in the family Trochidae, the top snails.

== Distribution ==
This marine species is found in raised beach deposits off the Algoa Bay along the South African east coast.
