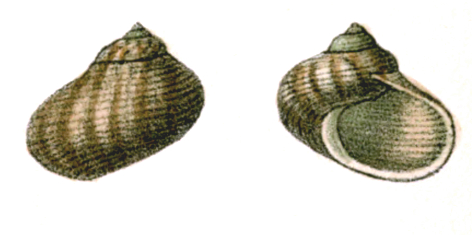
- Drawing with two views of a shell of Pseudostomatella baconi

Scientific classification
- Kingdom: Animalia
- Phylum: Mollusca
- Class: Gastropoda
- Subclass: Vetigastropoda
- Order: Trochida
- Family: Trochidae
- Subfamily: Stomatellinae
- Genus: Pseudostomatella
- Species: P. baconi

Binomial name
- Pseudostomatella baconi (Adams, A. in Adams, H.G. & A. Adams, 1854)

Synonyms
- Stomatella baconi A. Adams, 1850

= Pseudostomatella baconi =

Species of gastropod

Pseudostomatella baconi is a species of small sea snail, a marine gastropod mollusk in the family Trochidae, the top snails.

== Description ==
The subturbinate shell has an oval-orbicular shape. The spire is produced, the apex acute. The whorls are concave above. The color is dull white, variegated with reddish brown. The shell is transversely spirally sulcate, the interstices longitudinally striated. The aperture is sulcate within. The white, inner lip is a little thickened, reflexed, and concentrically striate.

== Distribution ==
This marine species is endemic to Australia and occurs off Western Australia.
