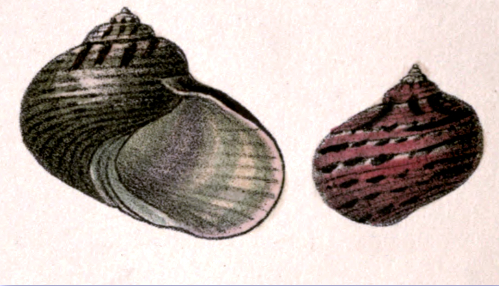
- Drawing with two views of a shell of Pseudostomatella papyracea

Scientific classification
- Kingdom: Animalia
- Phylum: Mollusca
- Class: Gastropoda
- Subclass: Vetigastropoda
- Order: Trochida
- Family: Trochidae
- Subfamily: Stomatellinae
- Genus: Pseudostomatella
- Species: P. papyracea

Binomial name
- Pseudostomatella papyracea (Gmelin, 1791)

Synonyms
- Stomatella papyracea (Gmelin, 1791); Stomatella tumida Gould, 1849; Turbo papyraceus Gmelin, 1791

= Pseudostomatella papyracea =

Species of gastropod

Pseudostomatella papyracea, common name the papery stomatella, is a species of sea snail, a marine gastropod mollusk in the family Trochidae, the top snails.

== Description ==
The size of a shell varies between 17 mm and 32 mm. The thin, globose shell is obliquely conoidal. It is fawn colored, with a series of short markings at the periphery alternately reddish and white. It has narrow girdles on the spirals of fine arrow-shaped articulations. The surface is shining and polished. It is spirally sculptured by numerous low wide riblets. The striae of increment are fine. The spire is conical, small and acute with 5 to 6 whorls. The last whorl is very rapidly enlarging. The whorls of the spire show narrow sharp spiral lirae decussated by close raised longitudinal striae. The oval aperture is acutely angular above, not very oblique. It is brilliantly iridescent inside, and lightly silicate. The columella is deeply arcuate. The umbilical region is covered by an opaque, white, arcuately striated callus. Its outer edge is well defined.

The animal, according to A. Adams, has a horny operculum and although bulky is able to retract entirely within the shell.

== Distribution ==
This marine species occurs off the Philippines and in the Indo-West Pacific.
