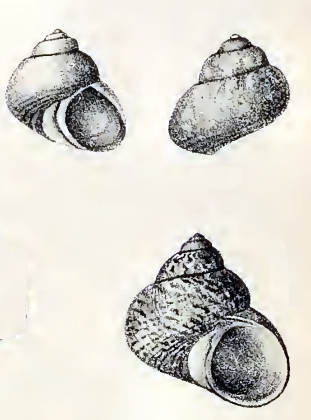
- Drawing with three views of a shell of Calliotrochus marmoreus

Scientific classification
- Kingdom: Animalia
- Phylum: Mollusca
- Class: Gastropoda
- Subclass: Vetigastropoda
- Order: Trochida
- Family: Trochidae
- Subfamily: Stomatellinae
- Genus: Calliotrochus
- Species: C. marmoreus

Binomial name
- Calliotrochus marmoreus (Pease, 1861)

Synonyms
- Calliotrochus excellens Iredale, 1937; Calliotrochus normalis Iredale, 1937; Calliotrochus symbolicus Iredale, 1937; Calliotrochus symbolicus alter Iredale, 1937; Conotalopia marmorata (Pease, 1861); Fossarina hoffmeisteri Ladd, 1966; Fossarina (Minopa) hoffmeisteri Ladd, H.S. 1966; Gibbula (Calliotrochus) cummingae Kilburn, 1977; Gibbula cummingae Kilburn, 1977; Gibbula marmorea (Pease, 1861); Gibbula phasianella (Deshayes, 1863); Margarita marmorea Pease, 1861 (original description); Margarita ponsonbyi Preston, 1908; Margarita striatula (Garrett, 1857); Trochinella perconfusa Iredale, 1937; Trochus (Margarita) striatula Garrett, 1857; Trochus phasianellus (Deshayes, 1863); Trochus striatula Garrett, 1857; Turbo phasianellus Deshayes, 1863

= Calliotrochus marmoreus =

Species of gastropod

Calliotrochus marmoreus is a species of sea snail, a marine gastropod mollusk in the family Trochidae, the top snails.

== Description ==
The height of the shell attains 6 mm, its diameter also 6 mm. The small shell has a globose-turbinate shape and is narrowly perforate. It is thin, smooth, shining, marbled and mottled with various shades of olive, brown and pinkish, usually showing dots of white, or spiral lines of white and pink or brown articulated. The conical spire is short and has a minute, acute apex. The sutures are impressed. The about 5 whorls are rounded. The body whorl is large, convex below and indented around the narrow white umbilicus. The oblique aperture is rounded-oval, with a very thin layer of bluish iridescent nacre within. The outer, basal and columella margins are well curved, thin, simple, and converging and united across the parietal wall by a thin layer of callus

== Distribution ==
This marine species occurs in the following locations:

- Red Sea
- tropical Indo-Pacific
- Hawaii
- Queensland, Australia
