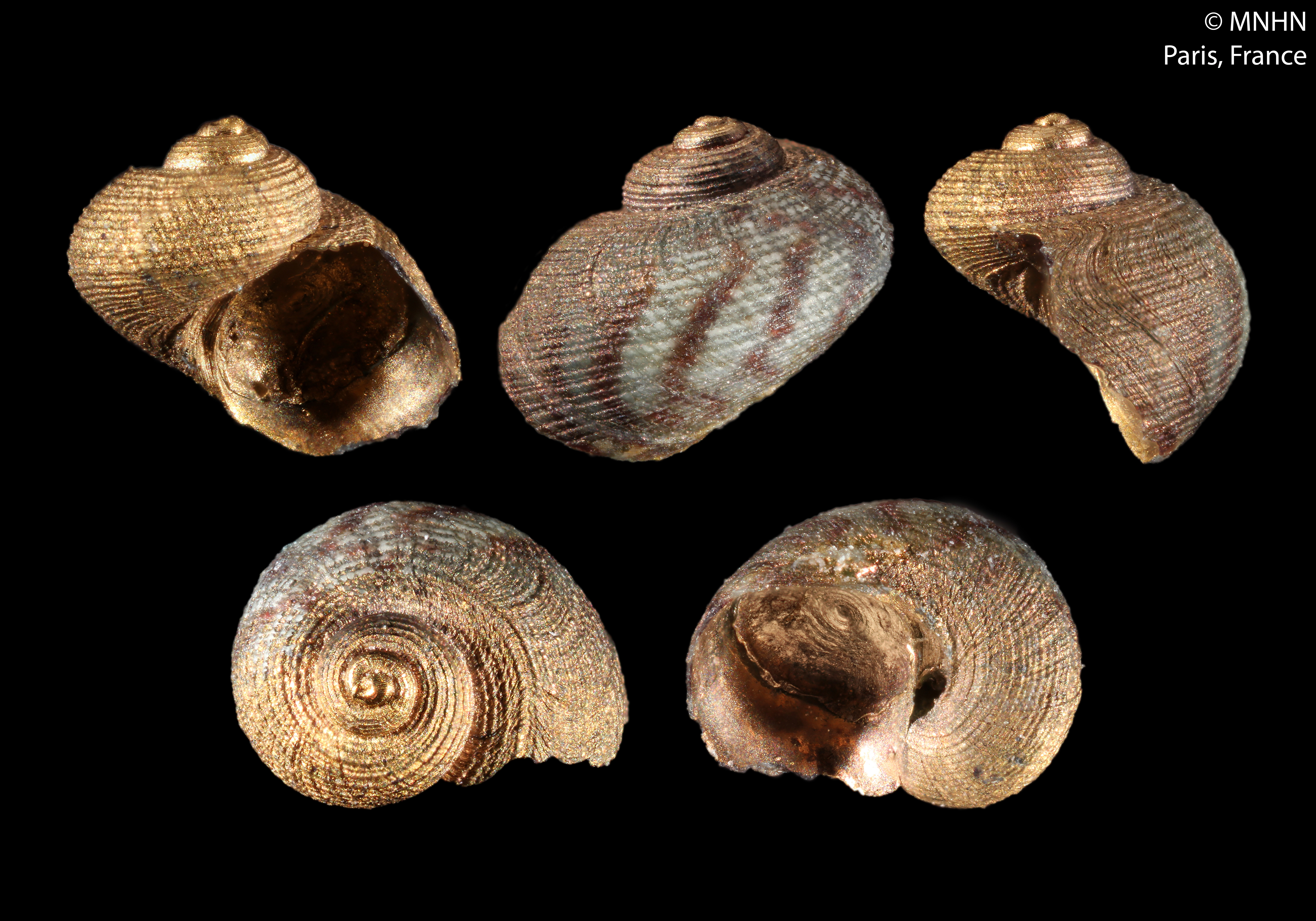
- Shell of Clydonochilus mariei (syntype at MNHN, Paris)

Scientific classification
- Kingdom: Animalia
- Phylum: Mollusca
- Class: Gastropoda
- Subclass: Vetigastropoda
- Order: Trochida
- Superfamily: Trochoidea
- Family: Trochidae
- Subfamily: Fossarininae
- Genus: Clydonochilus; P. Fischer, 1890

Type species
- Clydonochilus mariei P. Fischer, 1890

Synonyms
- Fossarina (Clydonochilus) P. Fischer, 1890 superseded rank

= Clydonochilus =

Genus of gastropods

Clydonochilus is a genus of sea snails, marine gastropod mollusks in the subfamily Fossarininae of the family Trochidae, the top snails.

== Species ==
- Clydonochilus mariei Fischer, P., 1890
