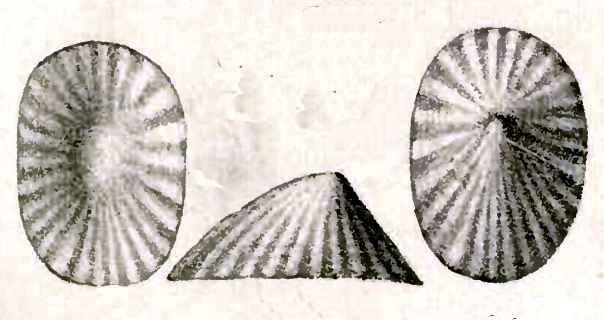
- Drawing with three views of a shell of Broderipia eximia

Scientific classification
- Kingdom: Animalia
- Phylum: Mollusca
- Class: Gastropoda
- Subclass: Vetigastropoda
- Order: Trochida
- Family: Trochidae
- Subfamily: Fossarininae
- Genus: Broderipia; Gray, 1847

Type species
- Scutella rosea Broderip, W.J., 1834

= Broderipia =

Genus of gastropods

Broderipia is a genus of sea snails, marine gastropod mollusks in the family Trochidae, the top snails.

== Description ==
The shell is limpet-shaped, non-spiral, oblong-ovate and flattened. The shell is bilaterally symmetrical when adult. The apex is either subcentral or posterior, and either remaining as a minute recumbent spiral or lost in the adult shell. The ovate aperture is very large and internally brilliantly iridescent or almost deprived of nacre.

== Distribution ==
The species of this marine genus occurs in the Red Sea, Gulf of Oman, Mauritius, New Caledonia, French Polynesia and in the Pacific Ocean.

== Species ==
Species within the genus Broderipia include:

- Broderipia cumingii A. Adams, 1851
- Broderipia eximia G. & H. Nevill, 1869
- Broderipia iridescens (Broderip, 1834)
- Broderipia nitidissima Deshayes, 1863
- Broderipia rosea (Broderip, 1834)
- Broderipia subiridescens (Pilsbry, 1890)
