= Broderipia cumingii =

Scientific classification
- Kingdom: Animalia
- Phylum: Mollusca
- Class: Gastropoda
- Subclass: Vetigastropoda
- Order: Trochida
- Family: Trochidae
- Subfamily: Fossarininae
- Genus: Broderipia
- Species: B. cumingii

Binomial name
- Broderipia cumingii A. Adams, 1851

Synonyms
- Margarita cumingii (A. Adams, 1851)

Species of gastropod

Broderipia cumingii is a species of sea snail, a marine gastropod mollusk in the family Trochidae, the top snails.

== Description ==
The broadly umbilicated shell has an elevated-conical shape. It is cinereus, painted with brown undulating lines. The whorls are ornamented with transverse riblets, the last with 3 median lirae, longitudinally elevated striate. The large umbilicus is encircled by a crenulated cingulus, and within elegantly decussated by radiating and transverse lines. It is distinguished from Broderipia iridescens by its prominent angulated columellar margiu and granulato-corrugose surface.

== Distribution ==
This marine species occurs off the Philippines.
