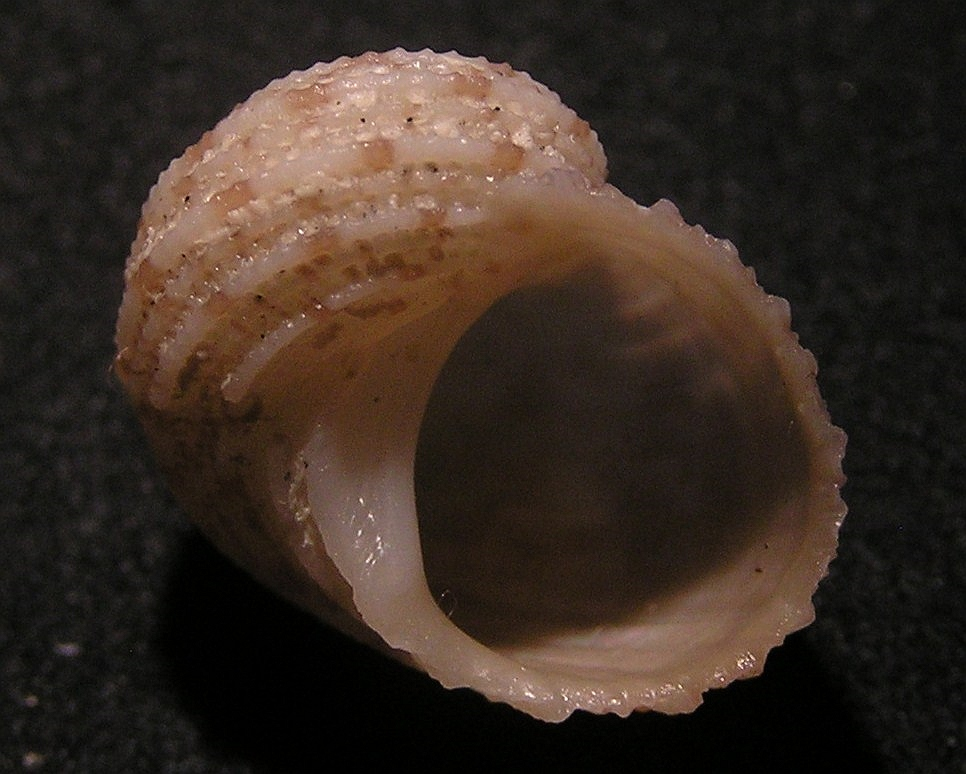
- Apertural view of a shell of Pseudostomatella elegans

Scientific classification
- Kingdom: Animalia
- Phylum: Mollusca
- Class: Gastropoda
- Subclass: Vetigastropoda
- Order: Trochida
- Superfamily: Trochoidea
- Family: Trochidae
- Subfamily: Stomatellinae
- Genus: Pseudostomatella; Thiele, 1921

Type species
- Turbo papyraceus Gmelin, 1791

= Pseudostomatella =

Genus of gastropods

Pseudostomatella is a genus of small sea snails, marine gastropod mollusks in the subfamily Stomatellinae of the family Trochidae, the top snails.

== Distribution ==
This marine genus has a wide distribution. The species occur in the Central and East Indian Ocean, Indo-Malaysia and off Australia

== Species ==
Species within the genus Pseudostomatella include:

- Pseudostomatella baconi (Adams, A. in Adams, H.G. & A. Adams, 1854)
- Pseudostomatella clathratula (Adams, A. in Adams, H.G. & A. Adams, 1854)
- Pseudostomatella coccinea (A. Adams, 1850)
  - forma : Pseudostomatella coccinea flammulata (f) Pilsbry, H.A., 1920
- Pseudostomatella cycloradiata Usticke, 1959
- Pseudostomatella decolorata (Gould, A.A., 1848)
- Pseudostomatella erythrocoma (Dall, 1889)
- Pseudostomatella martini Poppe, Tagaro & Dekker, 2006
- Pseudostomatella orbiculata (A. Adams, 1850)
- Pseudostomatella papyracea (Gmelin, J.F., 1791)
- Pseudostomatella selecta (A. Adams, 1855)

Species brought into synonymy

- Pseudostomatella maculata (Quoy & Gaimard, 1834): synonym of Granata maculata (Quoy & Gaimard, 1834)
- Pseudostomatella rubra (Lamarck, 1822): synonym of Stomatolina rubra (Lamarck, 1822)

Taxa inquirenda

- Pseudostomatella decorata (A. Adams, 1855)
- Pseudostomatella monilifera (A. Adams, 1850)
- Pseudostomatella splendidula (A. Adams, 1854)
