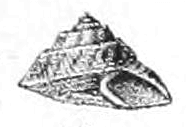
- Drawing of a shell of Enida japonica

Scientific classification
- Kingdom: Animalia
- Phylum: Mollusca
- Class: Gastropoda
- Subclass: Vetigastropoda
- Order: Trochida
- Superfamily: Trochoidea
- Family: Trochidae
- Genus: Enida
- Species: E. japonica

Binomial name
- Enida japonica A. Adams, 1860

Synonyms
- Chlorostoma miyatense Yokoyama, 1920; Calliostoma expansum Schepman, 1908; Enida speciosa A. Adams, 1860; Gibbula japonica A. Adams, 1860; Trochus (Gibbula) japonicus E. A. Smith, 1875

= Enida japonica =

Species of gastropod

Enida japonica is a species of sea snail, a marine gastropod mollusk in the family Trochidae, the top snails.

== Description ==
The depressed-conical shell is profoundly umbilicated. The 5½ whorls are slightly convex and ornamented with transverse granulose lirae. The interstices are obliquely longitudinally striated. The body whorl is encircled by a prominent crenulated carina at the periphery. The aperture is subquadrate. The inner lip is reflexed in the middle. The outer lip smooth within. The base of the shell shows a close grnuulose line. The umbilicus is moderate. The color of the shell is pale brown, ornamented with radiating brown patches.

== Distribution ==
This marine species occurs off Japan.
