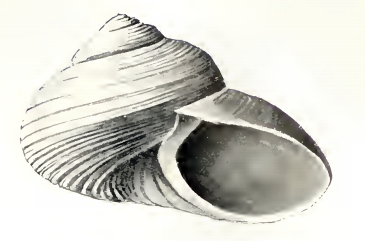
- Original drawing of a shell of Nanula galbina

Scientific classification
- Kingdom: Animalia
- Phylum: Mollusca
- Class: Gastropoda
- Subclass: Vetigastropoda
- Order: Trochida
- Superfamily: Trochoidea
- Family: Trochidae
- Genus: Nanula
- Species: N. galbina

Binomial name
- Nanula galbina (Hedley & May, 1908)

Synonyms
- Gibbula galbina Hedley & May, 1908

= Nanula galbina =

Species of gastropod

Nanula galbina is a species of sea snail, a marine gastropod mollusk in the family Trochidae, the top snails

== Description ==
The height of the species' shell attains 5.5 mm, its diameter 7 mm. The broadly perforate, translucent, glossy shell has a depressed-turbinate shape. Its colour is variable, either uniform buff, uniform white, or with brown spirals on a white ground. The 4½ whorls are rounded on the base, angled at the periphery, flattened above and impressed at the suture. The sculpture of the protoconch is smooth, the next whorl shows a couple of spiral keels, which by intercalation multiply in number, but decrease in relative importance as the whorls advance. The body whorl carries close fine spiral threads, of which every fourth or fifth predominates. The radials are confined to faint growth lines. The aperture is slightly descending, oblique, angled above, rounded below. The outer lip is simple. The columella is expanded, and a little reflected above. A substantial callus unites the lips. The deep umbilicus is narrow, spiral, externally funicular, exempt from the spiral sculpture.

== Distribution ==
This marine species is endemic to Australia and occurs in the shallow subtidal zone and the continental shelf off South Australia, New South Wales and Tasmania.
