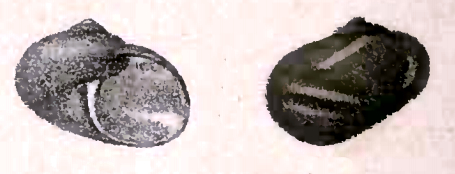
- Drawing with two views of a shell of Fossarina petterdi

Scientific classification
- Kingdom: Animalia
- Phylum: Mollusca
- Class: Gastropoda
- Subclass: Vetigastropoda
- Order: Trochida
- Family: Trochidae
- Genus: Fossarina
- Species: F. petterdi

Binomial name
- Fossarina petterdi Crosse, H., 1870

Synonyms
- Fossarina simpsoni Tenison-Woods, 1876; Minos petterdi Hutton, F.W. 1884

= Fossarina petterdi =

Species of gastropod

Fossarina petterdi is a species of very small sea snail, a marine gastropod mollusc or micromollusk in the family Trochidae, the top snails.

== Description ==
The shell grows to a length of 4 mm. The shell is narrowly umbilicated, faintly spirally striate, with hardly visible longitudinal striae. It is dark purplish black, with a few irregular white markings. The three whorls are convex. The body whorl is large and rounded. The umbilical region is white. The interior is greenish black, showing the external white markings. The thin, horny operculum is multispiral.

== Distribution ==
This marine species is endemic to Australia and occurs off South Australia, Tasmania and Victoria
