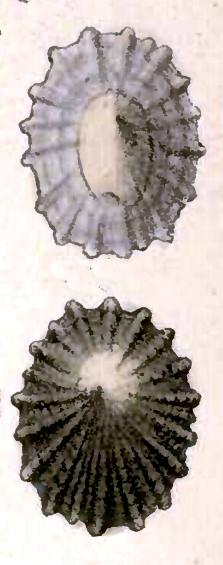
- Drawing with two views of a shell of Broderipia nitidissima

Scientific classification
- Kingdom: Animalia
- Phylum: Mollusca
- Class: Gastropoda
- Subclass: Vetigastropoda
- Order: Trochida
- Family: Trochidae
- Subfamily: Fossarininae
- Genus: Broderipia
- Species: B. nitidissima

Binomial name
- Broderipia nitidissima Deshayes, 1863

= Broderipia nitidissima =

Species of gastropod

Broderipia nitidissima is a species of sea snail, a marine gastropod mollusk in the family Trochidae, the top snails.

== Distribution ==
The height of the shell attains 3 mm, its diameter 9 mm. The shell is patella-shaped, ovate-oblong and symmetrical. The apex is subcentral. The shell is radiately ribbed. The ribs are strong, convex, simple, whitish. The interstices are irregularly marbled with brown. The interior is vividly pearly, with a rather large central spot of dull white notched in front, and bounded by the whitish muscle-impression. The rest of the inside has a nacre of unequaled brilliancy with opalescent reflections.

== Distribution ==
This species occurs in the Indian Ocean off Réunion.
