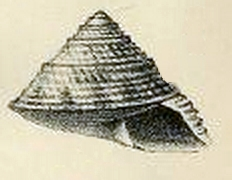
- Original drawing of a shell of Enida persica

Scientific classification
- Kingdom: Animalia
- Phylum: Mollusca
- Class: Gastropoda
- Subclass: Vetigastropoda
- Order: Trochida
- Superfamily: Trochoidea
- Family: Trochidae
- Genus: Enida
- Species: E. persica

Binomial name
- Enida persica Melvill, J.C. & R. Standen, 1903

Synonyms
- Gibbula (Enida) persica (Melvill, J.C. & R. Standen, 1903)

= Enida persica =

Species of gastropod

Enida persica is a species of sea snail, a marine gastropod mollusk in the family Trochidae, the top snails.

== Description ==
The height of the shell is 3 mm, its diameter 5 mm. The shell is small, solid and has a depressed conical shape. It is deeply umbilicated. The shell has six whorls with an elaborate sculpture. The lirae and carinae on the body whorl number together six above the periphery, while below it there are ten, all being more or less granulate. The aperture is subquadrate. The base of the shell is flattened. The umbilical region is somewhat excavate. The color of the shell show pale red blotches, of a trigonal shape round the last two whorls, and most conspicuous at the periphery.

== Distribution ==
This marine species occurs in the Gulf of Oman.

== Bibliography ==
- Trew, A., 1984. The Melvill-Tomlin Collection. Part 30. Trochacea. Handlists of the Molluscan Collections in the Department of Zoology, National Museum of Wales.
