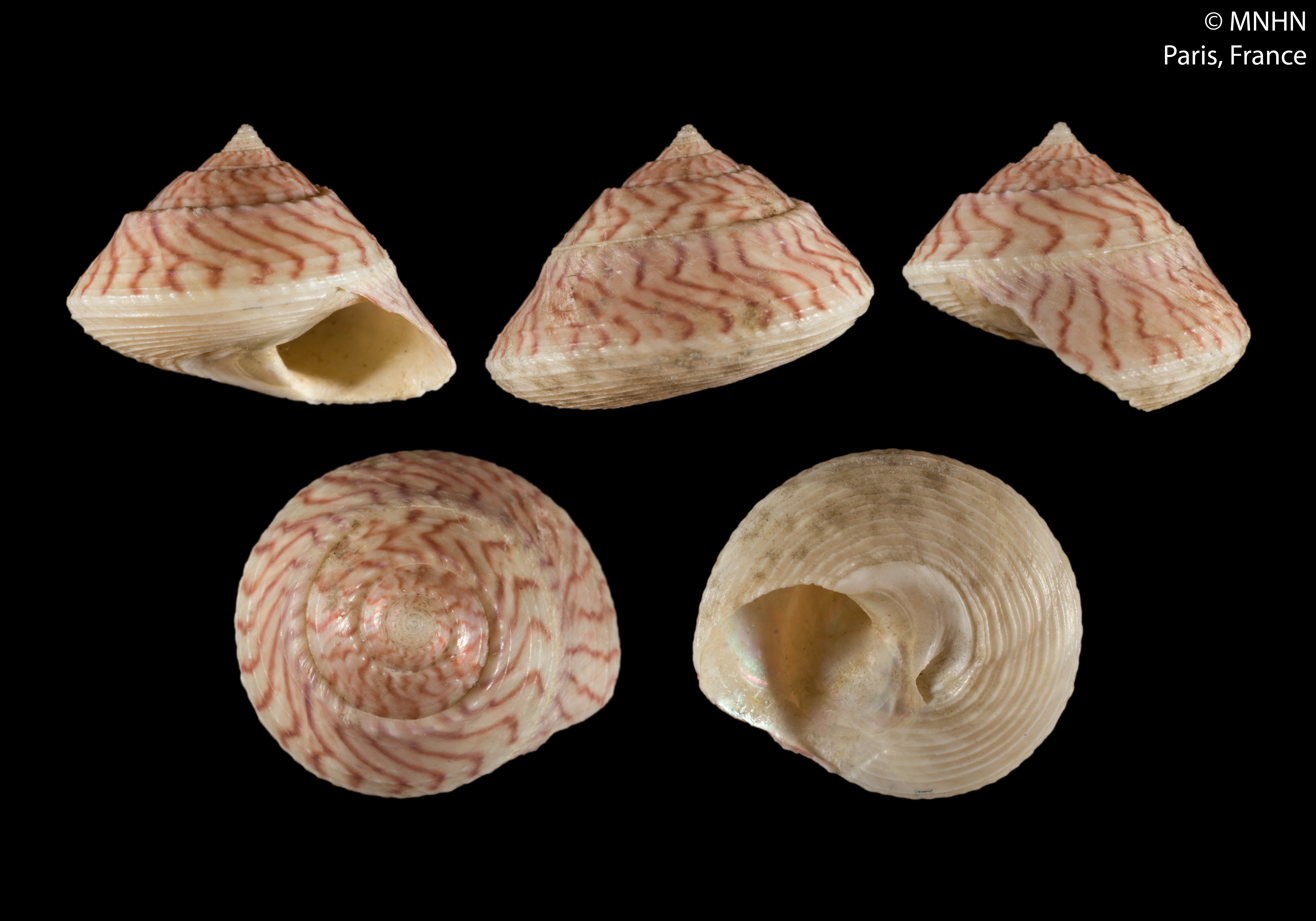
- Shell of Callumbonella suturalis (lectotype at MNHN, Paris)

Scientific classification
- Kingdom: Animalia
- Phylum: Mollusca
- Class: Gastropoda
- Subclass: Vetigastropoda
- Order: Trochida
- Superfamily: Trochoidea
- Family: Trochidae
- Genus: Callumbonella
- Species: C. suturalis

Binomial name
- Callumbonella suturalis (Philippi, 1836)

Synonyms
- Calliostoma suturale (Philippi, 1836); Calliostoma vincentae Kaicher 1986; Callumbonella namibiensis Rolán, Gonzalez-Porto & de Matos-Pita, 2009; Gibbula gorgonarum Fischer 1884; Trochus suturalis Philippi 1836 (original description); Trochus tetragonostoma Jordan 1895; Zizyphinus folini Fischer P. 1882

= Callumbonella suturalis =

Species of gastropod

Callumbonella suturalis is a species of sea snail, a marine gastropod mollusk in the family Trochidae, the top snails.

== Description ==
The size of the shell varies between 13 mm and 32 mm. The oblique, umbilicate shell has a depressed-conical shape. The shell is cream-colored, with the tint of a blush rose. The seven whorls are planate, very smooth in the middle. They are above and below coronated with series of small tubercles. The superior nodules large and acute. The sculpture is variable as regards the beaded rows of striae. The body whorl is angulated, inferior face convex, concentrically cingulate. Its margin is very densely transversely striate and with oblique sulci, elegantly granulate-nodose. The about 16 basal cinguli are unequal. The aperture is angulated. Young specimens have a deep umbilicus which is inclosed within a sharp ridge.

== Distribution ==
It was originally discovered as a fossil from the Pliocene in Sicily and Calabria, Italy, but later found alive in the Bay of Bay of Biscay. This species occurs in the Atlantic Ocean off Cape Verde Islands, the Canary Islands, Namibia and off Morocco; in the Mediterranean Sea off Algeria.
