= N. flindersi =

N. flindersi may refer to:

- Nanula flindersi, the Flinders top shell, a species of minute sea snail in the family Trochidae
- Neolithodes flindersi, a species of king crab
