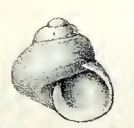
- Drawing of a shell of Nanula tasmanica

Scientific classification
- Kingdom: Animalia
- Phylum: Mollusca
- Class: Gastropoda
- Subclass: Vetigastropoda
- Order: Trochida
- Superfamily: Trochoidea
- Family: Trochidae
- Genus: Nanula; Thiele, 1924

Type species
- Gibbula tasmanica Petterd, W.F., 1879

= Nanula =

Genus of gastropods

Nanula is a genus of sea snails, marine gastropod mollusks in the family Trochidae, the top snails.

== Distribution ==
The species in this genus are endemic to Australia and occur off New South Wales, South Australia, Tasmania, Victoria and Western Australia.

== Species ==
- Nanula flindersi Cotton, B.C. & F.K. Godfrey, 1935
- Nanula galbina (Hedley, C. & W.L. May, 1908)
- Nanula tasmanica Petterd, W.F., 1879
