= Fossarina rimata =

Scientific classification
- Kingdom: Animalia
- Phylum: Mollusca
- Class: Gastropoda
- Subclass: Vetigastropoda
- Order: Trochida
- Family: Trochidae
- Genus: Fossarina
- Species: F. rimata

Binomial name
- Fossarina rimata (Hutton, 1884)

Species of gastropod

Fossarina rimata is a species of small sea snail, a marine gastropod mollusc in the family Trochidae, the top snails.

== Description ==
The shell grows to a length of 4 mm, its diameter is 5 mm and is auriform. It has a short spire and rounded lips.

== Distribution ==
This species occurs in New Zealand.

Only dead wash-up shells of the sea snail were recorded at Paratutae Island, Whatipu and at Puponga Point. Living samples of the species were reported at Echinoderm Reef and Mathesons Bay.
