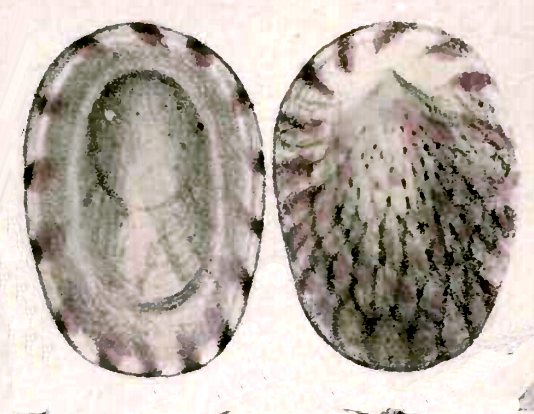
- Drawing with two views of a shell of Broderipia iridescens

Scientific classification
- Kingdom: Animalia
- Phylum: Mollusca
- Class: Gastropoda
- Subclass: Vetigastropoda
- Order: Trochida
- Family: Trochidae
- Subfamily: Fossarininae
- Genus: Broderipia
- Species: B. iridescens

Binomial name
- Broderipia iridescens (Broderip, 1834)

Synonyms
- Scutella iridescens Broderip, 1834

= Broderipia iridescens =

Species of gastropod

Broderipia iridescens is a species of sea snail, a marine gastropod mollusk in the family Trochidae, the top snails.

== Description ==
The size of the shell varies between 8 mm and 10 mm. The shell is limpet-shaped, with oval outline and posterior apex. The margins are expanded. In profile it is very depressed, highest a little back of the middle, the slope from the apex upward short and concave, from the apex downward gently convex. The surface is lusterless, with scarcely visible growth striae. The shell is opaque-white, radiately striped with olive-bordered red lines, generally interrupted and forming a tessellated white and dark pattern. The apex is minute, recumbent, spiral, dextral. The inside of the shell is brilliantly iridescent, not showing the color pattern clearly except at the red-and-white spotted margins.

== Distribution ==
This species occurs in the Pacific Ocean and in the Indian Ocean off Réunion.
