= Enida taiwanensis =

Scientific classification
- Kingdom: Animalia
- Phylum: Mollusca
- Class: Gastropoda
- Subclass: Vetigastropoda
- Order: Trochida
- Superfamily: Trochoidea
- Family: Trochidae
- Genus: Enida
- Species: E. taiwanensis

Binomial name
- Enida taiwanensis Z.Z. Dong, 2002

Species of gastropod

Enida taiwanensis is a species of sea snail, a marine gastropod mollusk in the family Trochidae, the top snails.

== Distribution ==
This marine species occurs off Southeast Asia and Taiwan.
