= Quebrada Monardes Formation =

Geological formation in Chile

- Stratigraphic range: Early Cretaceous
- Type: Geological formation
- Sub-units: Codocedo Limestone Member
- Underlies: Quebrada Seca Formation
- Overlies: Lautaro Formation, Pedernales Formation

Lithology
- Primary: Sandstone
- Other: Pebbly sandstone, conglomerate, mudstone, non-marine evaporite, limestone

Location
- Region: Atacama Region
- Country: Chile

The Quebrada Monardes Formation is a geological formation in Chile dating back to the Early Cretaceous. It was deposited in warm, arid to semi-arid conditions. One portion (the Codocedo Limestone Member) preserves a perennial salt lake covering at least 1,500 square kilometres (580 sq mi); this lake dried up, leaving a large area of mudflats. Fossils of iguanodontian dinosaurs and ctenochasmatid pterosaurs have been found in the formation.

== See also ==
- List of dinosaur-bearing rock formations
- List of pterosaur-bearing stratigraphic units
