= Nanula flindersi =

Scientific classification
- Kingdom: Animalia
- Phylum: Mollusca
- Class: Gastropoda
- Subclass: Vetigastropoda
- Order: Trochida
- Superfamily: Trochoidea
- Family: Trochidae
- Genus: Nanula
- Species: N. flindersi

Binomial name
- Nanula flindersi Cotton & Godfrey, 1935

Species of gastropod

Nanula flindersi, common name Flinders top shell, is a species of minute sea snail, a marine gastropod mollusk or micromollusk in the family Trochidae, the top snails

== Description ==
The height of the shell attains 4 mm.

== Distribution ==
This marine species is endemic to Australia and occurs in the shallow subtidal zone and the continental shelf off South Australia, Victoria and Western Australia.
