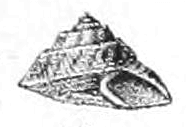
- Enida japonica

Scientific classification
- Kingdom: Animalia
- Phylum: Mollusca
- Class: Gastropoda
- Subclass: Vetigastropoda
- Order: Trochida
- Superfamily: Trochoidea
- Family: Trochidae
- Genus: Enida; A. Adams, 1860

Type species
- Enida japonica A. Adams, 1860

Synonyms
- Gibbula (Enida) Adams, 1860

= Enida =

Genus of gastropods

Enida is a genus of sea snails, marine gastropod mollusks in the family Trochidae, the top snails (not assigned to a subfamily).

== Description ==
The shell has a depressed-conical shape. It is widely umbilicate. The convex whorls are concentrically granose-lirate. The sutures are canaliculate. The body whorl is carinated or angulated. The aperture is subquadrate. The outer lip is simple, or lirate within. The inner lip is reflexed. The umbilicus is large. The margin is crenulated.

== Species ==
Species within the genus Enida include:

- Enida persica Melvill, J.C. & R. Standen, 1903
- Enida japonica A. Adams, 1860
- Enida taiwanensis Z.Z. Dong, 2002
