= Callumbonella =

- Drawing of a shell of Callumbonella suturalis

Scientific classification
- Kingdom: Animalia
- Phylum: Mollusca
- Class: Gastropoda
- Subclass: Vetigastropoda
- Order: Trochida
- Superfamily: Trochoidea
- Family: Trochidae
- Genus: Callumbonella; Thiele, 1924

Type species
- Gibbula gorgonarum P. Fischer, 1883

Synonyms
- Umbotrochus Thiele, 1924

Genus of gastropods

Callumbonella is a genus of sea snails, marine gastropod mollusks in the family Trochidae, the top snails (unassigned to a subfamily).

== Species ==
Species within the genus Callumbonella include:

- Callumbonella suturalis (Philippi, 1836)

Species brought into synonymy

- Callumbonella namibiensis Rolan, Gonzalez-Porto & de Matos-Pita, 2009: synonym of Callumbonella suturalis (Philippi, 1836)
