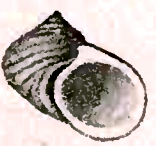
- Drawing of a shell of Fossarina patula

Scientific classification
- Kingdom: Animalia
- Phylum: Mollusca
- Class: Gastropoda
- Subclass: Vetigastropoda
- Order: Trochida
- Family: Trochidae
- Genus: Fossarina
- Species: F. patula

Binomial name
- Fossarina patula (A. Adams & Angas, 1863)

Synonyms
- Fossarina brazieri Angas, 1871; Fossarina funiculata Tenison-Woods, 1880

= Fossarina patula =

Species of gastropod

Fossarina patula is a species of very small sea snail, a marine gastropod mollusc or micromollusk in the family Trochidae, the top snails.

== Description ==
The shell grows to a length of 6 mm. The shell is widely umbilicated, with alternate larger and smaller tuberculated spiral ribs. The ribs are simple on the base. The umbilicus is acutely carinate-margined. The shell is whitish, sparsely maculated with dark brown. The three whorls are convex. The outer lip is ascending posteriorly.

== Distribution ==
This marine species is endemic to Australia and occurs off New South Wales, Tasmania and Victoria
