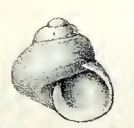
- Drawing with an apertural view of a shell of Nanula tasmanica

Scientific classification
- Kingdom: Animalia
- Phylum: Mollusca
- Class: Gastropoda
- Subclass: Vetigastropoda
- Order: Trochida
- Superfamily: Trochoidea
- Family: Trochidae
- Genus: Nanula
- Species: N. tasmanica

Binomial name
- Nanula tasmanica (Petterd, 1879)

Synonyms
- Calliotrochus tasmanicus May, W.L. 1923; Gibbula tasmanica Petterd, 1879

= Nanula tasmanica =

Species of gastropod

Nanula tasmanica is a species of sea snail, a marine gastropod mollusk in the family Trochidae, the top snails

== Description ==
The height of the shell attains 6 mm, its diameter 5.5 mm. The small, rather thin, perforate shell has a globose-turbinate shape. It is lusterless, whitish, tinged with yellow or greenish, unicolored or marked with a few angular radiating maculations of blackish-brown. The spire is very short. The sutures are impressed. The about 4½ whorls are convex, rounded, all over finely regularly spirally lirulate. The body whorl is rounded at the periphery, or very bluntly subangular. It is convex beneath and impressed around the umbilicus. The aperture is quite oblique, rounded-ovate, angular above, broadly rounded below, with a thin iridescent layer of nacre within. The outer, basal and columellar margins are rather thin, curved, the latter joined to the upper margin by a thin white parietal callous. The narrow umbilicus is not bounded by an angle.

This dull whitish little shell may be known by its finely striate surface, narrow umbilicus, short spire and globose-turbinate form.

== Distribution ==
This marine species is endemic to Australia and occurs in the shallow subtidal zone off Tasmania, Victoria and in the Bass Strait.
