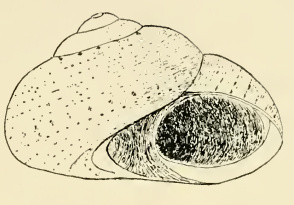
- Original drawing of a shell of Fossarina reedi

Scientific classification
- Kingdom: Animalia
- Phylum: Mollusca
- Class: Gastropoda
- Subclass: Vetigastropoda
- Order: Trochida
- Family: Trochidae
- Genus: Fossarina
- Species: F. reedi

Binomial name
- Fossarina reedi (Verco, 1907)

= Fossarina reedi =

Species of gastropod

Fossarina reedi, common name Reed top shell, is a species of very small sea snail, a marine gastropod mollusc or micromollusk in the family Trochidae, the top snails.

== Description ==
The shell grows to a height of 3 millimetres (0.12 in), its diameter 6 millimetres (0.24 in). The solid shell has a depressed conoid shape. The four whorls are smooth, flatly convex, slightly hollowed just below the suture. The apex is blunt. The suture is impressed. The periphery is round and barely angulate. The base of the shell is convex. The umbilicus is moderate. The oblique aperture is roundly elliptical. The outer lip is simple and bevelled inside. A short thin glaze can be found on the base of the whorl. The arcuate columella is everted posteriorly, with a tiny notch where it joins the round basal lip at the end of the bordering lira of the umbilicus. The throat is smooth and iridescent.

Sculpture: the dorsum looks as though it were spirally lirate, but is really quite smooth except for very fine microscopic curved retrocurrent accremental scratchings. On the base are about a dozen fine spiral incisions, with radial scratch-marks more valid and distant than on the dorsum. These are still stouter and wrinkling within and near the perforation. An inconspicuous lira borders the umbilicus, which has a shallow groove just above it.

Colour: chestnut-brown, with dark-brown spiral hair-lines of varying width; dotted with tiny white spots, which, below the suture, are aggregated into small pyramidal blotches with their apex upward, six in the body whorl. A white band, scalloped on both edges of these aggregated dots, encircles the periphery. An articulated white-and-brown spiral ornaments the lira bordering the umbilicus, a second lies just outside this, and another with more distant double white spots beyond. The rest of the base, which is of a lighter tint than the dorsum, has scattered tiny white dots. The umbilicus is white. Over all is a transparent glaze, with a bronze reflex.

There may be a faint gutter where the labrum joins the body whorl. The colour may be dark-brown. The peripheral white band may fade out toward the aperture. The white blotches beneath the suture and the articulated bands around the perforation seem the most constant ornament.

== Distribution ==
This marine species is endemic to Australia and occurs off South Australia.
