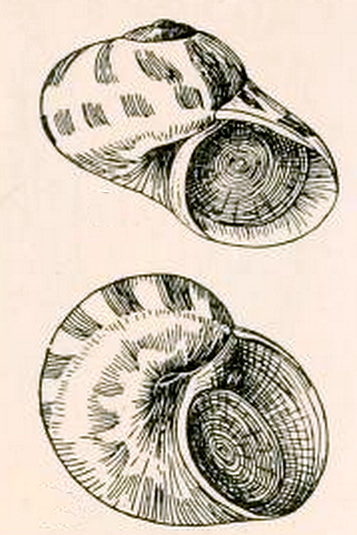
- Drawing with two views of a shell of Fossarina legrandi

Scientific classification
- Kingdom: Animalia
- Phylum: Mollusca
- Class: Gastropoda
- Subclass: Vetigastropoda
- Order: Trochida
- Family: Trochidae
- Genus: Fossarina
- Species: F. legrandi

Binomial name
- Fossarina legrandi (Petterd, 1879)

Synonyms
- Fossarina (Minopa) legrandi Petterd, 1879; Gibbula legrandi Tate, R. & May, W.L. 1901; Minopa legrandi (Petterd, 1879); Calliotrochus legrandi May, W.L. 1921

= Fossarina legrandi =

Species of gastropod

Fossarina legrandi, common name Legrand's top shell, is a species of very small sea snail, a marine gastropod mollusc or micromollusk in the family Trochidae, the top snails.

== Description ==
The shell grows to a length of 5 mm. The small, thin shell has a depressed globose shape. It is highly polished, translucent and rich brown. The minute spire contains 2½ whorls and is very little elevated. The suture is much impressed. The aperture is inflately lunate. It is tinged white and faintly dilate at the inner portion.

== Distribution ==
This marine species is endemic to Australia and occurs off New South Wales, South Australia, Tasmania, Victoria and Western Australia.
