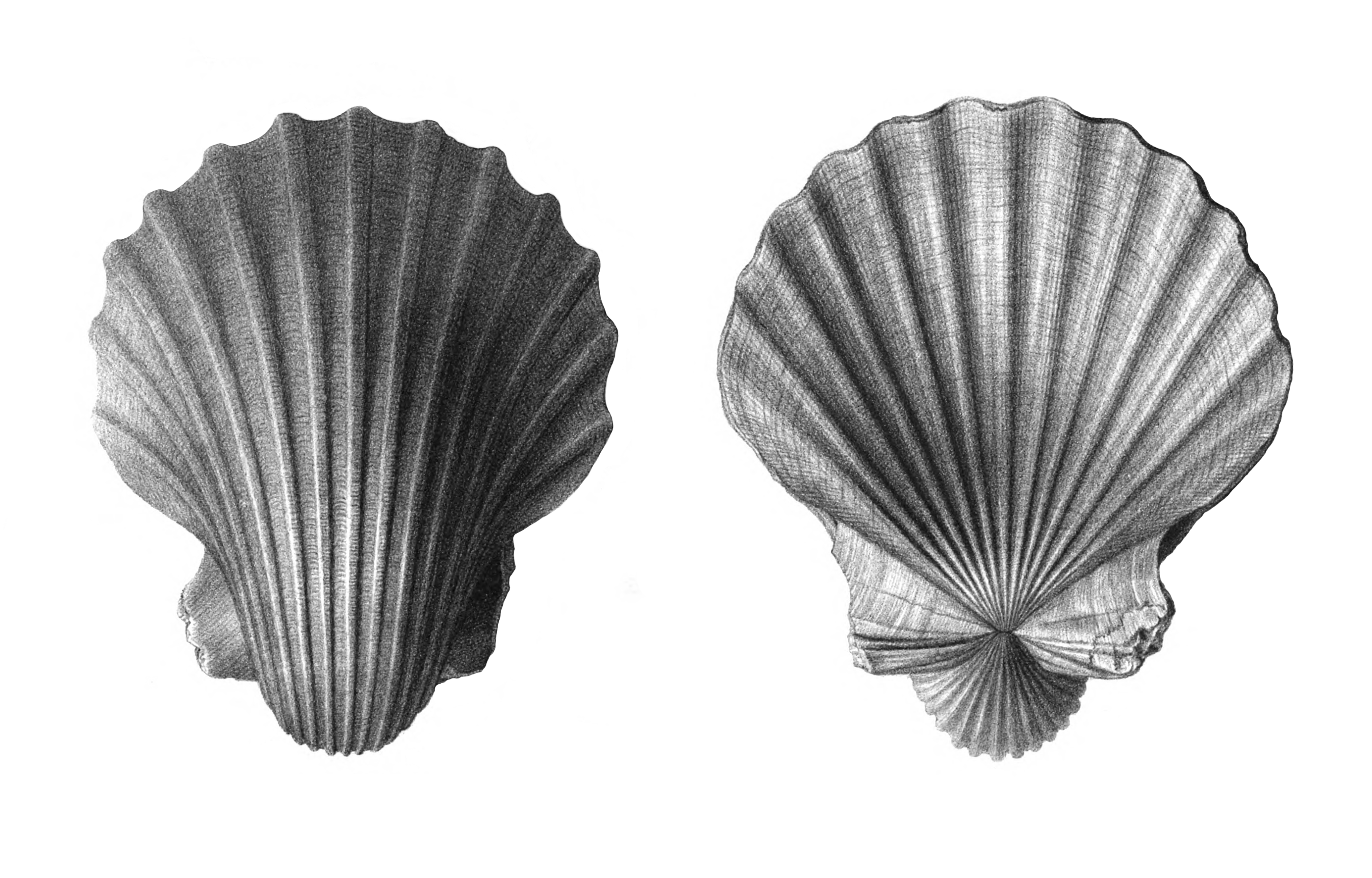
- Illustration of Weyla alata
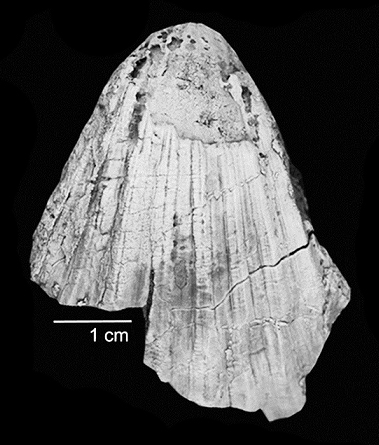
- Weyla bodenbenderi

Scientific classification
- Kingdom: Animalia
- Phylum: Mollusca
- Class: Bivalvia
- Order: Pectinida
- Family: Pectinidae
- Genus: †Weyla; J. Böhm, 1920

= Weyla =

Extinct bivalve genus

Weyla is an extinct genus of pectinid bivalve that belongs to the family Pectinidae (scallops). The genus had a global distribution occurring throughout the Early Jurassic period. It was likely a sedentary genus living semi-infaunally.

== Taxonomy ==
=== Species ===
This genus contains numerous species. They are listed below:

1. Weyla alata (Buch, 1838)
2. Weyla ambongoensis (Thevenin, 1908)
3. Weyla bodenbenderi (Behrendsen, 1891)
4. Weyla domeykoi (R. A. Philippi, 1899)
5. Weyla lacazei (Haime, 1855)
6. Weyla meeki S. E. Damborenea, 1987
7. Weyla pradoana (Verneuil & Collomb, 1853)
8. Weyla rollieri (Cossmann, 1916)
9. Weyla titan (Möricke, 1894)
10. Weyla unca (R. A. Philippi, 1899)
11. Weyla yukonensis Aberhan, 1998

== Distribution ==
The genus had a global distribution making it a cosmopolitan taxon. During the Hettangian, the only confirmed occurrence of this genus has been restricted to Canada. Its range would expand to a circumpacific and southern distribution during the Sinemurian where it could now be found along the Pacific coast of the Americas. This range included Western Canada, Mexico (Sonora), Texas, Ecuador, Peru, Argentina and Chile.

The Pliensbachian would see this genus start to occur in France, Spain and Morocco as the genus range expanded into the Tethys Ocean through the Hispanic Coreidor or the Proto-Atlantic Ocean as the Pangean Supercontinent broke apart. While their range would continue to occur throughout the Americas would continue into the Toarcian, there have been no recognized occurrence of Weyla is Europe. They would also continue to persist in North Africa and even expand further into Africa and the Middle East including Turkey, Saudi Arabia, Pakistan, Kenya and Madagascar.
