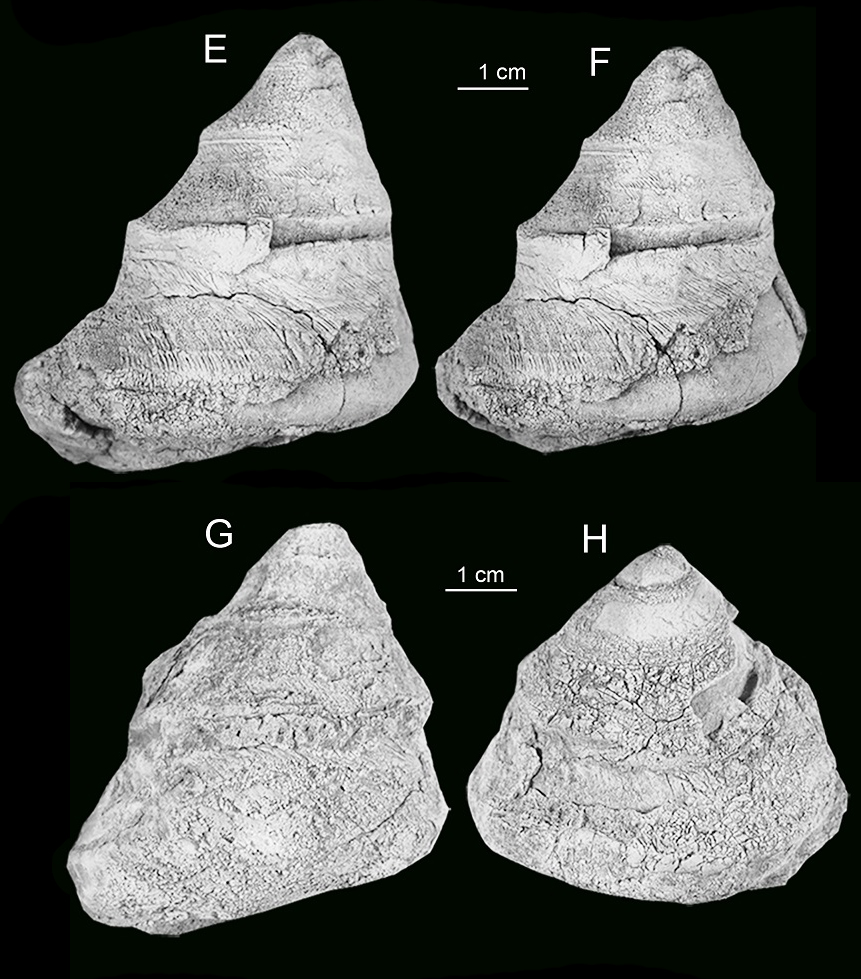
- Lithotrochus humboldtii of La Casilda fossil locality from Mulanguiñeu Formation

Scientific classification
- Kingdom: Animalia
- Phylum: Mollusca
- Class: Gastropoda
- Subclass: Vetigastropoda
- Order: Trochida
- Superfamily: Trochoidea
- Family: Trochidae
- Genus: †Lithotrochus; Conrad, 1855

Type species
- †Lithotrochus humboldtii von Buch, 1839

Other species
- †Lithotrochus rothi Damborenea & Ferrari, 2008

Synonyms
- List: †Pleurotomaria humboldtii von Buch, 1839; †Trochus andinus Möricke, 1894; †Turritella andii d'Orbigny, 1842

= Lithotrochus =

Lithotrochus Temporal range: 200–183 Ma Early Jurassic

Genus of gastropods (fossil)

Lithotrochus is a genus of marine trochid gastropods mainly known from the Early Jurassic epoch of South America. While long considered endemic to the fossil record of South America, findings from the Pogibshi Formation of Alaska suggest that the genus expanded its paleogeographical range from the Northern Hemisphere to South America during the Jurassic.
