= Fossarininae =

Scientific classification
- Kingdom: Animalia
- Phylum: Mollusca
- Class: Gastropoda
- Subclass: Vetigastropoda
- Order: Trochida
- Family: Trochidae
- Subfamily: Fossarininae; Bandel, 2009

Subfamily of gastropods

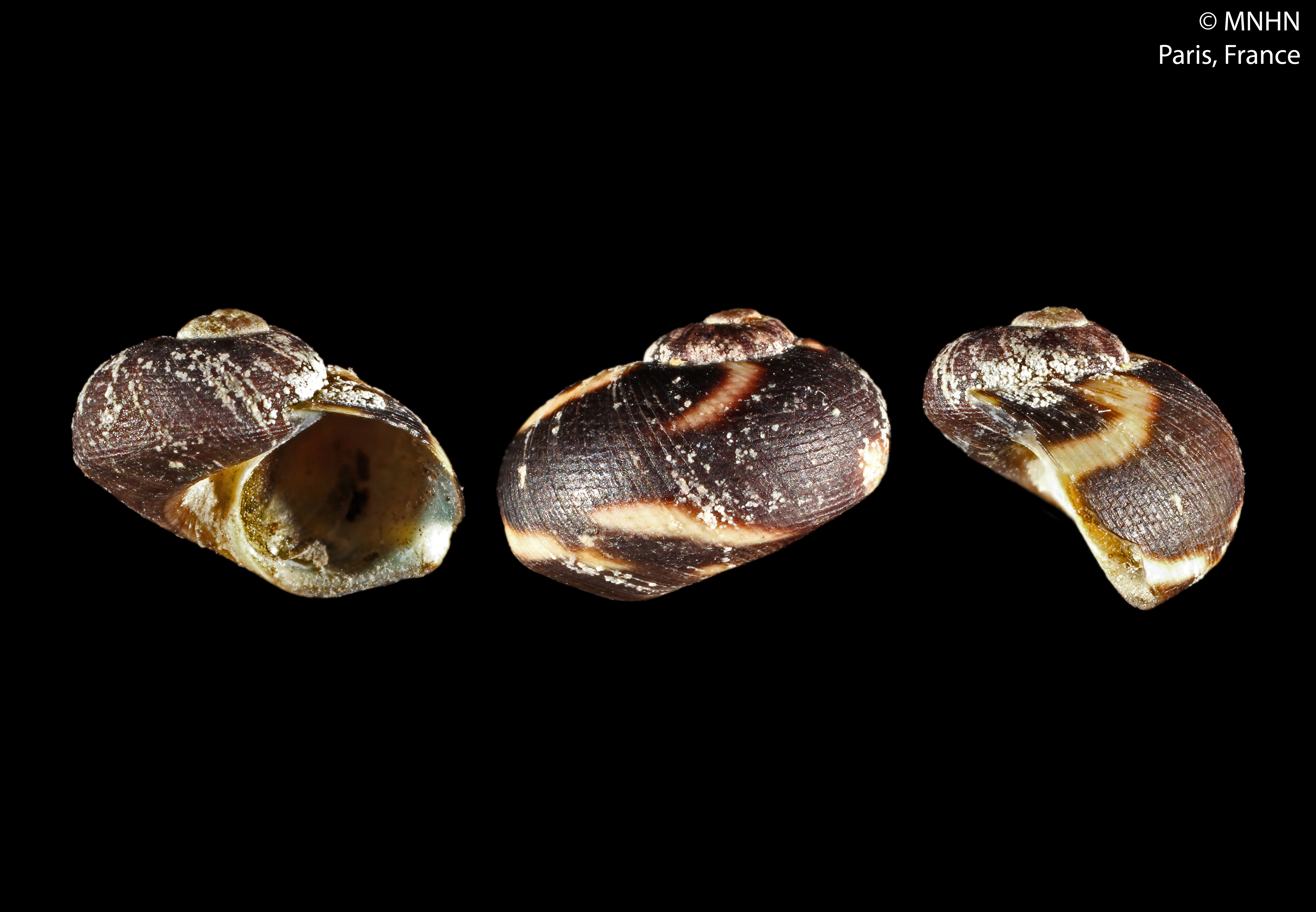
Fossarina petterdi

The Fossarininae are a taxonomic subfamily of very small to large sea snails, marine gastropod molluscs in the family Trochidae, common name top snails.

== Genera ==
- Broderipia Gray, 1847
- Clydonochilus P. Fischer, 1890
- Fossarina A. Adams & Angas, 1864
- Minopa Iredale, 1924
- Synaptocochlea Pilsbry, 1890

Synonyms

- Minos Hutton, 1884: synonym of Fossarina A. Adams & Angas, 1864
