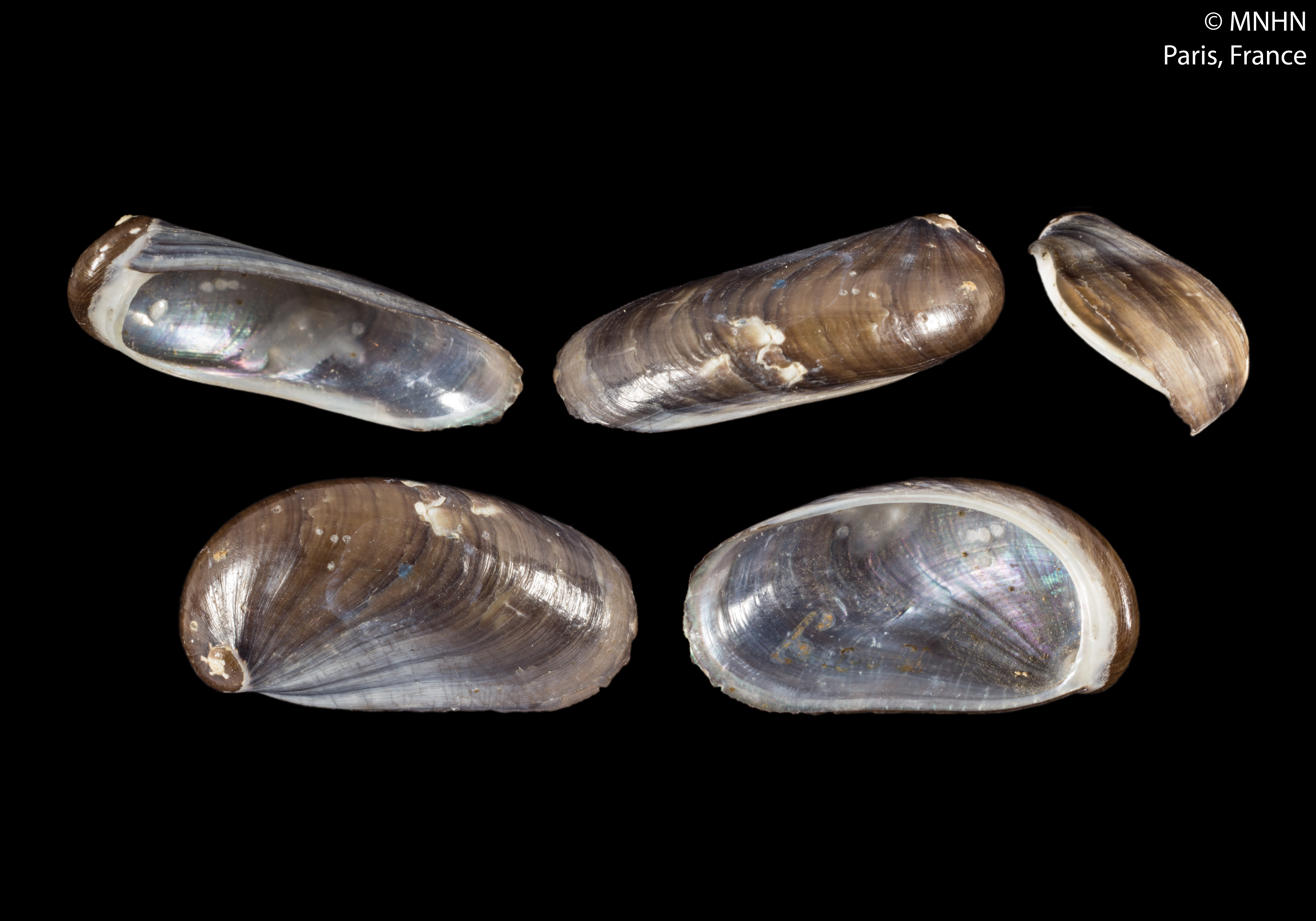
- Shell of Stomatella auricula (syntype at MNHN, Paris)

Scientific classification
- Domain: Eukaryota
- Kingdom: Animalia
- Phylum: Mollusca
- Class: Gastropoda
- Subclass: Vetigastropoda
- Order: Trochida
- Superfamily: Trochoidea
- Family: Trochidae
- Subfamily: Stomatellinae; Gray, 1840

Synonyms
- Stomatellidae (rank change); Stomatiidae Fischer

= Stomatellinae =

Stomatellinae Temporal range: Triassic - Recent

Subfamily of gastropods

Stomatellinae is a subfamily of small sea snails with a brilliantly nacreous interior of the shell, marine gastropod mollusks in the family Trochidae, the top snails.

== Taxonomy ==
In the earlier classification used in the Treatise on Invertebrate Paleontology, the Stomatellidae was included in the Archaeogastropoda, however, this taxon is now largely abandoned in favor of the more recently defined Vetigastropoda.

According to Bouchet & Rocroi (2005), Williams et al. (2008) and Williams et al. (2010) this taxon underwent a rank change from family Stomatellidae to subfamily Stomatellinae within the family Trochidae.

== Shell description ==
The shells of species in this subfamily are mostly low-spired, subglobose, with few whorls. They are either Haliotis-shaped or non-spiral and limpet-like. They lack an umbilicus. Most species lack an operculum. The aperture is very arge, and through it the interior of the last whorl is entirely visible from below. The interior of the shell is iridescent because of a layer of nacre. The muscle impression inside the shell is crescent-shaped.

The animal has a broad foot, longitudinally divided by a median line below, and tuberculate above. The muzzle is broad, ending distally in an oval disc. The mouth is rounded. The long tentacles are pointed. The eyes are situated on short and heavy peduncles outside and behind the tentacles. The epipodium is prominent, fleshy, with or without cirri. Frontal lobes are present. The mantle edge is simple or reflexed and foliated. There is no slit in the front. The operculum is small, horny, thin, multispiral and often wanting. The gill has a single curved plume on the left or on the outer side of the mantle cavity. Its distal third is free.

== Genera ==
Genera within the subfamily Stomatellinae include:

- Calliotrochus P. Fischer, 1879
- Microtis H. Adams & A. Adams, 1850
- Pseudostomatella Thiele, 1924
- Stomatella Lamarck, 1816
- Stomatia Helbling, 1779
- Stomatolina Iredale, 1937

Genera brought into synonymy

- Gena Gray, 1840: synonym of Stomatella Lamarck, 1816
- Microtina A. Adams in Sowerby, 1854: synonym of Microtis (gastropod)|Microtis H. Adams & A. Adams, 1850 (Not available : established conditionally as a substitute name for Microtis A. Adams, 1850 if considered a homonym of the plant genus Microtis R. Brown. However, A. Adams kept using Microtis as the valid name)
- Plocamotis P. Fischer, 1885: synonym of Stomatella Lamarck, 1816
- Stomax Montfort, 1810: synonym of Stomatia Helbling, 1779 (unnecessary substitute name for Stomatia)
