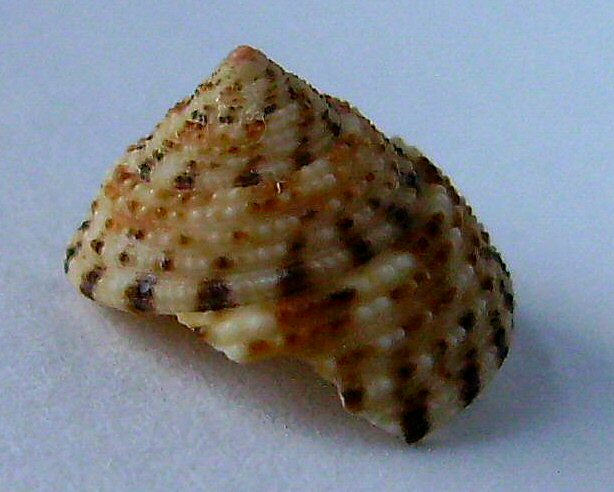
- A shell of Coelotrochus tiaratus

Scientific classification
- Kingdom: Animalia
- Phylum: Mollusca
- Class: Gastropoda
- Subclass: Vetigastropoda
- Order: Trochida
- Superfamily: Trochoidea
- Family: Trochidae; Rafinesque, 1815

Subfamilies
- See text

Synonyms
- Anisobranchia

= Trochidae =

Family of snails

The Trochidae, common name top-snails or top-shells, are a family of various sized sea snails, marine gastropod molluscs in the subclass Vetigastropoda. This family is commonly known as the top-snails because in many species the shell resembles a toy spinning top.

== Taxonomy ==
The family Trochidae consists of the following subfamilies:

- Alcyninae Williams, Donald, Spencer & Nakano, 2010
- Cantharidinae Gray, 1857
- Carinotrochinae S.-Q. Zhang, J. Zhang & S.-P. Zhang, 2020
- Chrysostomatinae Williams, Donald, Spencer & Nakano, 2010
- Fossarininae Bandel, 2009
- Halistylinae Keen, 1958
- Kaiparathininae B. A. Marshall, 1993
- Monodontinae Gray, 1857
- Stomatellinae Gray, 1840
- Trochinae Rafinesque, 1815
- Umboniinae H. Adams & A. Adams, 1854 (1840)

Additionally, the following genera have not yet been placed in any subfamily:

- Callumbonella Thiele, 1924
- † Chuelskia Kaim, Beisel & Kurushin, 2004
- †Coeloconulus Nützel, 2012
- Enida A. Adams, 1860
- † Eocalliostoma O. Haas, 1953
- † Fagnastesia S. N. Nielsen, Frassinetti & Bandel, 2004
- † Falsotectus Gründel, Keupp & Lang, 2017
- † Guidonia De Stefani, 1880
- †Lithotrochus Conrad, 1855
- † Molvaldesia del Río, 2022
- † Protorotella Makiyama, 1925

== Description ==
=== Shell ===
The length of an adult shell varies between 5 mm and 130 mm. There is also a wide variation in the shape of the shell. This goes from low auriform (ear-shaped) with a wide aperture to the long, slender conical forms of typical top shells. The shape may also be subglobose, turbinate or helicoid. Their height may vary between 3 mm and 152 mm. The shell contains only a few whorls. These have a highly variable exterior, ranging from smooth or glossy to sculptured.

The internal shell is nacreous. They have a brown, entirely corneous, circular, multispiral operculum which fits the aperture snugly. The operculum is formed of numerous gradually increasing whorls with a central nucleus. The aperture may be entire, tetragonal or rounded and has no reflected lip. The peristome is generally not continuous.

These shells are often brightly colored and adorned with darker bands.

Species of the family Trochidae differ from those in the family Turbinidae in having a corneous, never calcareous, operculum, which is always multispiral.

=== Internal anatomy ===
The animal is similar in general form to the Turbinidae. The top snails are characterized by some primitive traits: a heart with two atria. They have retained only one kidney and the second osphradium has been lost in the course of evolution. The mantle cavity contains a single gill.

Along the side of the foot are three or more pairs of sensory epipodial tentacles. The head has a short, broad rostrum. The intertentacular lobes are simple or digitated, separate or united across the front, sometimes obsolete. The jaws are developed or absent.

The radula is rhipidoglossate. The rhachidian teeth are always present and well-developed. The lateral teeth generally number 5 on each side, sometimes more numerous. The marginal teeth are narrow and very numerous.

== Distribution and habitat ==
This family has a worldwide distribution in tropical, temperate and arctic waters. Members of this family are among the most common marine snails along the rocky shores of Europe. Most species in the family live either in the intertidal zone or in the shallow subtidal zone, but some live in deeper water. They are usually abundant on solid, suitable substrates, like rocky shores and reefs.

== Ecology ==
=== Life cycle ===
Species of the family Trochidae are dioecious, and the fertilization occurs externally by the release of eggs and sperm. Top snail eggs are laid individually or in gelatinous egg masses in the water. Individuals may hatch as free-swimming planktonic larvae or juvenile crawlers with a short swimming stage.

=== Feeding behavior ===
This family of snails consists of herbivores, grazing with their radulae on rocky surfaces, feeding on algae and vegetable detritus, and more rarely by filter-feeding, as observed in the genus Umbonium.
