= Dohrn =

Dohrn may refer to:

== People ==
- Anton Dohrn (1840–1909), German biologist and Darwinist
- Bernardine Dohrn (born 1942), American political radical
- Carl August Dohrn (1806–1892), German entomologist
- Georg Dohrn (1867–1942), German conductor and pianist
- Heinrich Wolfgang Ludwig Dohrn (1838–1913), German entomologist
- Rinaldo Dohrn or Reinhard Dohrn (1880–1962), German-Italian zoologist
- Walt Dohrn (born 1970), American voice actor, screenwriter, animator, television director, and comedian

== Ships ==
- FRV Anton Dohrn, German Fisheries Research Vessel launched 1954 active into 1980s.
- Anton Dohrn, University of Southern California, Venice Marine Biological Station vessel (35 feet (10.7 m)) active in scientific work on the California coast.
- Anton Dohrn (1911), American motor yacht used in scientific work

== See also ==
- Anton Dohrn Seamount
- Dohrn's thrush-babbler (Horizorhinus dohrni), a bird endemic to São Tomé and Príncipe
