= Pupina =

Pupina Temporal range: Oligocene–Holocene

Scientific classification
- Domain: Eukaryota
- Kingdom: Animalia
- Phylum: Mollusca
- Class: Gastropoda
- Subclass: Caenogastropoda
- Order: Architaenioglossa
- Superfamily: Cyclophoroidea
- Family: Pupinidae
- Genus: Pupina; Vingard, 1829

Type species
- Pupina keraudreni Vignard, 1829

Synonyms
- Eupupina L. Pfeiffer, 1875; Helix (Sagdinella) Mörch, 1872; Kanapa Clench, 1949 (original rank); Pupina (Eupupina) L. Pfeiffer, 1875; Pupina (Kanapa) Clench, 1949· accepted, alternate representation; Pupina (Pupina) Vignard, 1829· accepted, alternate representation; Pupina (Pupinesia) Clench, 1949· accepted, alternate representation; Pupina (Pupinoa) Clench, 1949· accepted, alternate representation; Pupinesia Clench, 1949 (original rank); Pupinoa Clench, 1949

Genus of gastropods

Pupina is a genus of land snails with an operculum, terrestrial gastropod molluscs in the subfamily Pupillinae of the family Pupinidae.

According to the Australian Faunal Directory, this genus is a synonym of Signepupina Iredale, 1937

== Species ==
Species in the genus Pupina include:

- Pupina acehensis Maassen, 2002
- Pupina anceyi Bavay & Dautzenberg, 1899
- Pupina artata Benson, 1856
- Pupina arula Benson, 1856
- Pupina augustae Leschke, 1912
- Pupina aurea Hinds, 1842
- Pupina aureola Stoliczka, 1872
- Pupina bella Wiktor, 1998
- Pupina billeti H. Fischer, 1898
- Pupina bipalatalis O. Boettger, 1890
- Pupina brachysoma Ancey, 1904
- Pupina brazieri (Crosse, 1870)
- Pupina brenchleyi E. A. Smith, 1892
- Pupina compacta Möllendorff, 1897
- Pupina complanata (Pease, 1861)
- Pupina coxeni Brazier, 1875: synonym of Signepupina coxeni (Brazier, 1875) (unaccepted combination)
- Pupina crosseana Morlet, 1883
- Pupina cumingiana L. Pfeiffer, 1854
- Pupina difficilis O. Semper, 1864
- Pupina dohertyi E. A. Smith, 1897
- Pupina doriae Godwin-Austen, 1889: synonym of Tylotoechus doriae (Godwin-Austen, 1889) (unaccepted combination)
- Pupina douvillei Dautzenberg & H. Fischer, 1906
- Pupina ephippium Gredler, 1881
- Pupina evansi Godwin-Austen, 1889: synonym of Tylotoechus evansi (Godwin-Austen, 1889) (unaccepted combination)
- Pupina excisa Möllendorff, 1902
- Pupina exclamationis J. Mabille, 1887
- Pupina falkneri Maassen, 2002
- Pupina flava Möllendorff, 1884
- Pupina flexuosa Wiktor, 1998
- † Pupina fossilis W. Yü & H.-Z. Pan, 1982
- Pupina fuchsi Gredler, 1885
- Pupina gibba Hedley, 1891
- Pupina gibbosa Yen, 1939
- Pupina gracilis Möllendorff, 1887
- Pupina gravida van Benthem Jutting, 1963
- Pupina hosei Godwin-Austen, 1889: synonym of Tylotoechus hosei (Godwin-Austen, 1889) (unaccepted combination)
- Pupina huntingtoni Clench, 1949
- Pupina illustris J. Mabille, 1887
- Pupina keraudrenii Vignard, 1829
- Pupina macroformis Yen, 1939
- Pupina malkini Solem, 1962
- Pupina menglunensis D.-N. Chen & G.-Q. Zhang, 1998
- Pupina minuta Soós, 1911
- Pupina miokoana Möllendorff, 1897
- Pupina nitidula F. G. Thompson, 1987
- Pupina orophila van Benthem Jutting, 1963
- Pupina perspicua van Benthem Jutting, 1963
- Pupina pfeifferi Dohrn, 1862: synonym of Signepupina pfeifferi (Dohrn, 1862) (original combination)
- Pupina pycnochila van Benthem Jutting, 1963
- Pupina quadrasi Möllendorff, 1894
- Pupina remota Wiktor, 1998
- Pupina robusta van Benthem Jutting, 1963
- Pupina sangkarensis van Benthem Jutting, 1959
- Pupina schneideri I. Rensch, 1937
- Pupina scintillans van Benthem Jutting, 1963
- Pupina smitsi van Benthem Jutting, 1963
- Pupina solomonensis E. A. Smith, 1885
- Pupina sonlaensis D. S. Do, 2017
- Pupina speculum Tapparone Canefri, 1883
- Pupina suavis van Benthem Jutting, 1963
- Pupina teres Iredale, 1941
- Pupina thaitranbaii Do, 2017
- Pupina tortirostris (G. B. Sowerby III, 1917)
- Pupina vanheurni van Benthem Jutting, 1933
- Pupina variegata Wiktor, 1998
- Pupina verneaui Dautzenberg & H. Fischer, 1906
- Pupina vitiensis Garrett, 1873
