= Marine life of the Strait of Messina =

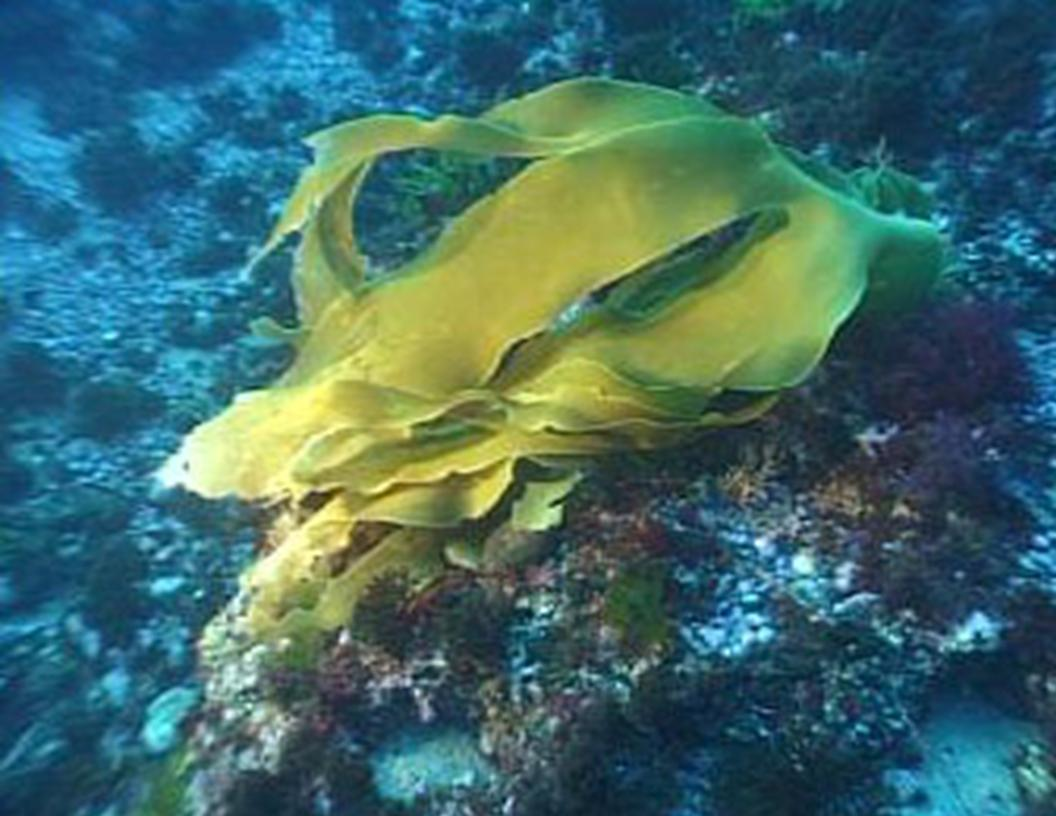
Laminaria in the Strait of Messina

The hydrology of the Strait of Messina accommodates a variety of populations of marine organisms. The intense currents and characteristic chemistry of the waters of the Strait determine an extraordinary biocoenosis in the Mediterranean Sea with a high abundance and diversity of species; the Strait of Messina, therefore constitutes an area of fundamental importance for biodiversity. Intense and alternate currents, the low temperature and an abundance of transported nitrogen and phosphorus transported to the surface from deep waters supports both pelagic and coastal benthic populations in a cycle of organic substance.

All this, with associated phenomena, determines an ecological rearrangement that simulates Atlantic conditions for species with a prevailing Western distribution. In fact, numerous primarily Atlantic species, for example the laminariae (large tawny algae), though also present in some other zones of the Mediterranean, succeed in forming true structured submarine forests only in the Strait of Messina and are evidence of the optimal environmental conditions there.

== Biota ==
The laminariae of low depth (Sacchoryza polyschides), or the deep populations of Laminaria ochroleuca, and the associated plant communities are dependent on the physical and biological characteristics of the substrate. In order to complete their life-cycle, these organisms demand a solid substrate already colonized by coralline algae, in the absence of which colonization cannot take place.

The Strait of Messina, bordered between the two basins of the Mediterranean, the West and the East, is an important point for migration of the species that are found in each. In this area planktonic and benthic communities from both or the Atlantic Ocean merge.

Benthic species of importance are Pilumnus inermis, previously considered to be exclusively Atlantic; Errina aspera (Hydrozoa), a famous endemic species of the Strait of Messina, on which lives a parasitic sea snail (Pedicularia sicula); found between 80 and 110 m. Other species are Ophiactis balli, the crustaceans Parthenope expansa and Portunus pelagicus and the giant barnacle, Pachylasma giganteum. Great biological and ecological importance is also ascribed to the already cited Laminariales of the Strait Sacchoryza polyschides and Laminaria ochroleuca, of Albunea carabus and to the conspicuous Pinna nobilis, the calcareous presence of red algae and immense prairies of Posidonia oceanica which covers wide areas and has a wide vertical distribution.

Of extreme importance because they are found only in small areas elsewhere in the Mediterranean are Phyllariopsis brevipes, Phyllariopsis purpurascens, Desmarestia dresnayi, Desmarestia ligulata, Desmarestia ramose and Cryptopleura species.

From the faunistic point of view the Strait of Messina is considered a "Paradise of the Zoologist" for the enormous biodiversity that characterizes it. The species of benthic invertebrates are those which arise greater interest since they are enriched by a great variety of forms and colours due to the abundance of Cnidaria (sea anemones, madrepore and corals). A clear example is the "forest" of yellow and red Paramuricea clavata. These, adding to the substrate, create an ideal benthic environment to accommodate numerous other species.

== Abyssal fauna ==
Another peculiarity of the Strait of Messina is the presence of a varied and numerous bathypelagic fauna that, transported to the surface by the upwelling current from the South, can be easily captured still alive in the points of greater turbulence, or found stranded along the coasts after adverse weather conditions. Examples are Chauliodus sloani, Argyropelecus hemigymnus and Myctophum punctatum.

=== Migration ===
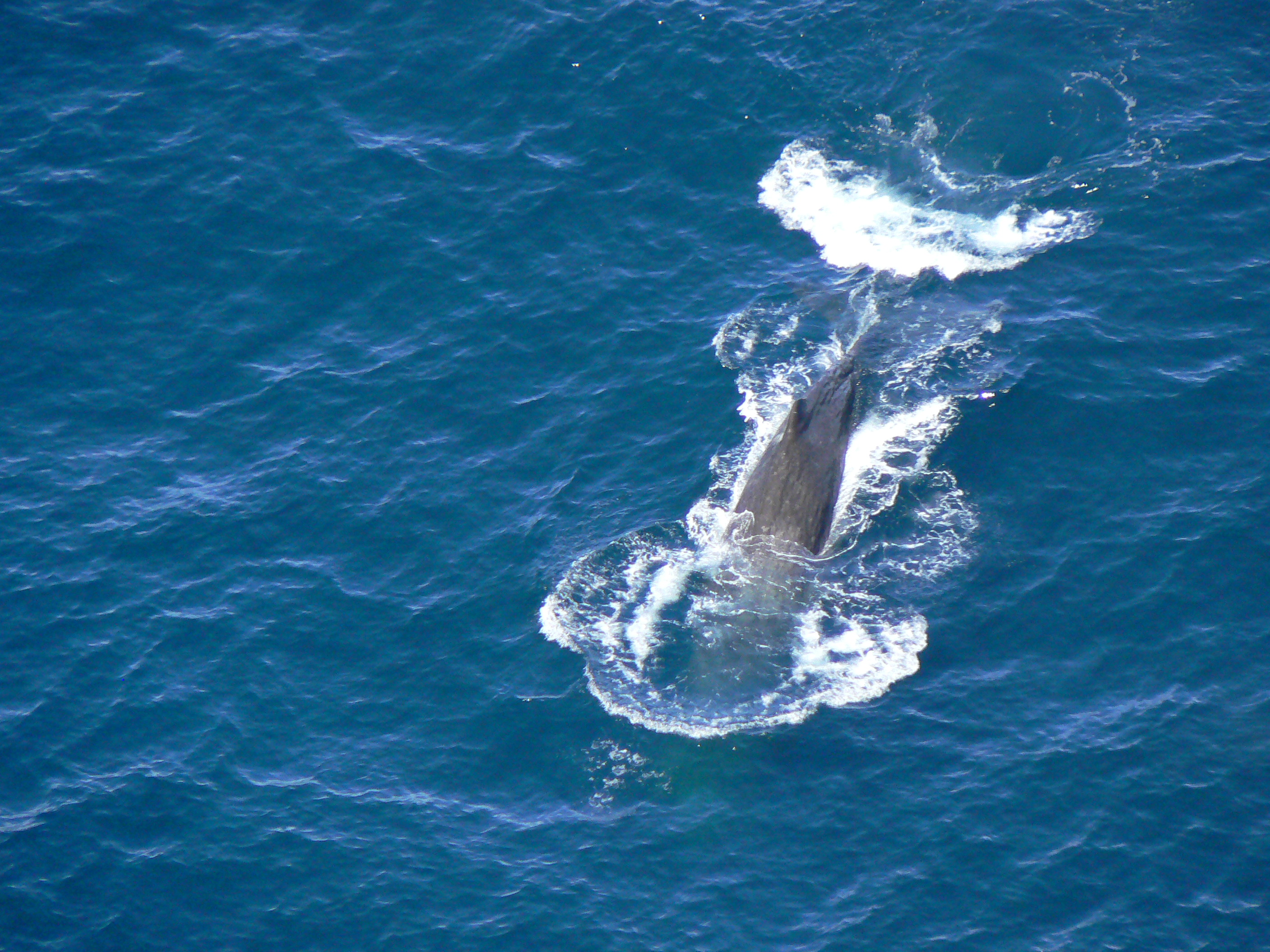
A sperm whale

The Strait of Messina is an important migratory route of the Mediterranean Sea. The best known and important, from an economic point of view, are the great pelagic fish - that is the Tuna (Thunnus thynnus), the Albacore (Thunnus alalunga), the Atlantic bonito (Sarda sarda), the Mediterranean Spearfish (Tetrapturus belone) and the Swordfish (Xiphias gladius). The fish of the Strait are captured with boats called feluche or small engine powered fishing boats called passerelle. These pelagic fish are assets unique to this part of the Mediterranean Sea. Only in the Strait, using various techniques, it is possible to capture Tuna throughout the year and in all age classes (from juveniles to adults) as the population moves between the Tyrrhenian and the Ionian Seas. The Strait of Messina is also an established route for the migration of Cetacea, and it is probably the most important in the Mediterranean Sea in terms of whale species diversity. Worthy of note, besides the several species of dolphins are the fin whales (Balaenoptera physalus) and particularly the sperm whales which migrate through the Strait to their breeding area, probably the Aeolian Islands. Sharks migrate through the Strait of Messina, including the great white shark (Carcharodon carcharias) and the bluntnose sixgill shark (Hexanchus griseus).

== German scientists ==
The abundant presence of marine fauna in the Straits, though noted by much earlier zoologists, was first effectively publicised by the Italian scientist Anastasio Cocco (1799–1854). Following this, in the second half of the 19th century and the beginning of the 20th century scientists from all Europe began to visit Messina for their studies. Many of these came from the German universities because marine biology was limited in that country. The German coast is short and has a far less diverse fauna than the Mediterranean. It is also relatively sunless. It was a German zoologist August David Krohn who first defined the Strait of Messina as the "Paradise of the Zoologist". Research intensified in 1872 when Anton Dohrn established the Stazione Zoologica at Naples, seven days travel afar from Berlin and two by boat to Messina. The research was initially in taxonomy, invertebrate anatomy and biogeography, but soon involved more fundamental subjects, especially embryology, comparative embryology and evolution. Among the Messina scientists were August David Krohn, Eduard Rüppell, Johannes Peter Müller, Carl Friedrich Wilhelm Claus, Albert von Kölliker, Carl Gegenbaur, Ernst Haeckel, Wilhelm Moritz Keferstein, Ilya Ilyich Mechnikov, Richard Hertwig and his brother Oskar, and Hermann Fol. The University of Messina still is today a prestigious center of research into marine zoology at an international level.

== Bibliography ==
- BAGUET F. (1995) Bioluminescence of deep-sea fishes in the Straits of Messina. In: The Straits of Messina Ecosystem (Guglielmo L., Manganaro A., De Domenico E., eds.). 203–212.
- BONANNO A., DE DOMENICO F., PROFETA A., SPANÒ N. (2004) The first finding of Portunus pelagicus (Decapoda, Brachyura) in the Straits of Messina (Central Mediterranean Sea). Rapp. Comm. Int. Mer Médit., 37: 495.
- CORTESE G., DE DOMENICO E. (1990) Some Considerations on the Levantine Intermediate Water Distribution in the Straits of Messina. Boll. Oceanol. Teor. Appl., 8(3): 197–207.
- DE DOMENICO E. (1987) Caratteristiche fisiche e chimiche delle acque nello Stretto di Messina. in: Le Detroit de Messine, Evolution Tectono-Sedimentaire Recente (Pliocene et Quaternaire) et Environment Actuel; Di Geronimo, Barrier, Mantenat (ed.s), Paris, DOC. ET TRAV. IGAL, 11: 225–235.
- DE DOMENICO M., DE DOMENICO E., CORTESE G., PULICANÒ G. (1988) Variazione spazio-temporale di nutrienti, clorofilla e carica microbica nelle acque dello Stretto di Messina. Atti 8° Congresso Ass. Ital. Oceanol. Limnol. (AIOL), Pallanza. 337–355.
- DEFANT A. (1940) Scilla e Cariddi e le correnti di marea nello Stretto di Messina. Geofis. Pura Appl., 2: 93–112.
- GIACOBBE S., SPANÒ N. (1996) New records of Albunea carabus (L., 1758) in the Mediterranean Sea. Crustaceana, 69(6): 719–726.
- GIACOBBE S., SPANÒ N. (2001) The Pilumnus inermis species in the Southern Tyrrhenian Sea and Straits of Messina (Central Mediterranean): distribution and ecology. Crustaceana, 74(7): 659–672.
- LONGO F. (1882) Il Canale di Messina e le sue correnti, con appendice sui pesci che lo popolano. Messina.
- MOSETTI F. (1988) Some News on the Currents in the Straits of Messina. Boll. Oceanol. Teor. Appl., 6(3): 119–201.
- RIBAUD P. (1884) Trattato teorico, pratico e storico sulle correnti ed altre particolarità e sui fenomeni che hanno luogo nel Canale di Messina. Napoli.
- RINELLI P., SPANÒ N., GIACOBBE S. (1999) Alcune osservazioni su crostacei decapodi ed echinodermi dei fondi a Errina aspera dello Stretto di Messina. Biol. Mar. Medit., 6(1): 430–432.
- SPANÒ N. (1998) Crustacea Decapoda distribution in the Messina Straits. Journ. Nat. Hist., 32: 1697–1705.
- SPANÒ N. (2002) Presenza di Parthenope expansa (Decapoda: Parthenopidae) nello Stretto di Messina. Biol. Mar. Medit., 9 (1): 645–646.
- SPANÒ N., RINELLI P., RAGONESE S. (1999) First finding of Albunea carabus (Decapoda - Anomura) along the southern coasts of Sicily (Central Mediterranean sea). In: Crustaceans and the Biodiversity Crisis, edited by F. Schram and J.C. von Vaupel Klein, BRILL Leiden: 395–404.
- TOMASINO M. (1995) The Exploitation of Energy in the Straits of Messina. In: The Straits of Messina Ecosystem (Guglielmo L., Manganaro A., De Domenico E., eds.). 49–60.
- VERCELLI F. (1925) Crociere per lo studio dei fenomeni dello Stretto di Messina. I. Il regime delle correnti e delle maree nello Stretto di Messina. Commissione Internazionale del Mediterraneo, Off. Grafiche Ferrari, Venezia, 209 pp.
