= Dorn (disambiguation) =

Dorn is a surname.

Dorn may also refer to

- Dorn, Gloucestershire, a hamlet in England
- River Dorn, Oxfordshire, England
- Dorn, an alternative name for the Thornback ray
- Dorn (band), a German metal band
- Dorn (board game), a Czech board game

== See also ==
- Dorne, a land in the fictional world of A Song of Ice and Fire
- Doorn, a town in the Netherlands
- Dohrn (disambiguation)
- Van Dorn (disambiguation)
