= G. bulbosa =

G. bulbosa may refer to:

- Gibberula bulbosa, a minute sea snail species in the genus Gibberula
- Gigantea bulbosa, a brown alga species

== See also ==
- Bulbosa
