= Saccorhiza =

Saccorhiza may refer to:

- Saccorhiza (alga), a genus of brown algae in the family Phyllariaceae
- Saccorhiza (foraminifera), a genus of foraminifera in the family Hippocrepinidae
