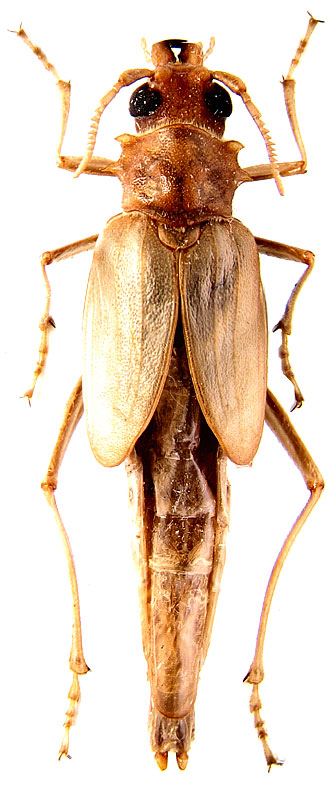

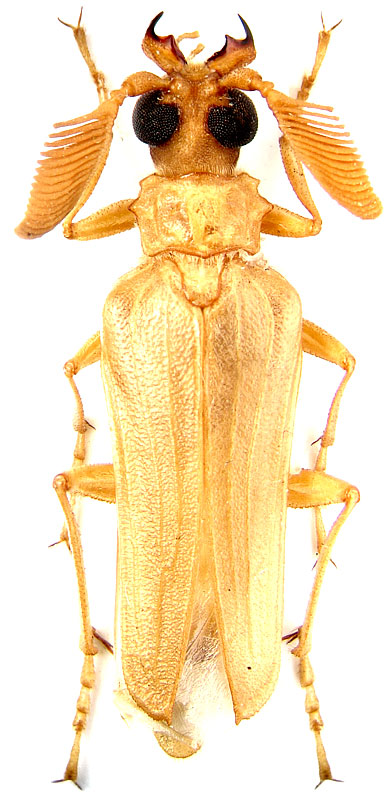
- Female (top) and male (bottom)

Scientific classification
- Kingdom: Animalia
- Phylum: Arthropoda
- Clade: Pancrustacea
- Class: Insecta
- Order: Coleoptera
- Suborder: Polyphaga
- Infraorder: Cucujiformia
- Family: Cerambycidae
- Subfamily: Prioninae
- Tribe: Prionini
- Genus: Microarthron; Pic, 1900
- Species: M. komaroffi

Binomial name
- Microarthron komaroffi (Dohrn, 1885)

Synonyms
- Prionus komarowi Pic, 1898; Microarthron komarowi (Pic, 1898); Prionus (Polyarthron) komarovi Semenov, 1935

= Microarthron =

Microarthron komaroffi

Species of beetle

Microarthron is a genus of longhorn beetles in the family Cerambycidae. It is monotypic, being represented by the single species Microarthron komaroffi. It is native to Central Asia and is found in the deserts of Uzbekistan, Turkmenistan, Kazakhstan and Tajikistan. Males measure up to 19 mm, while females measure up to 47 mm.
