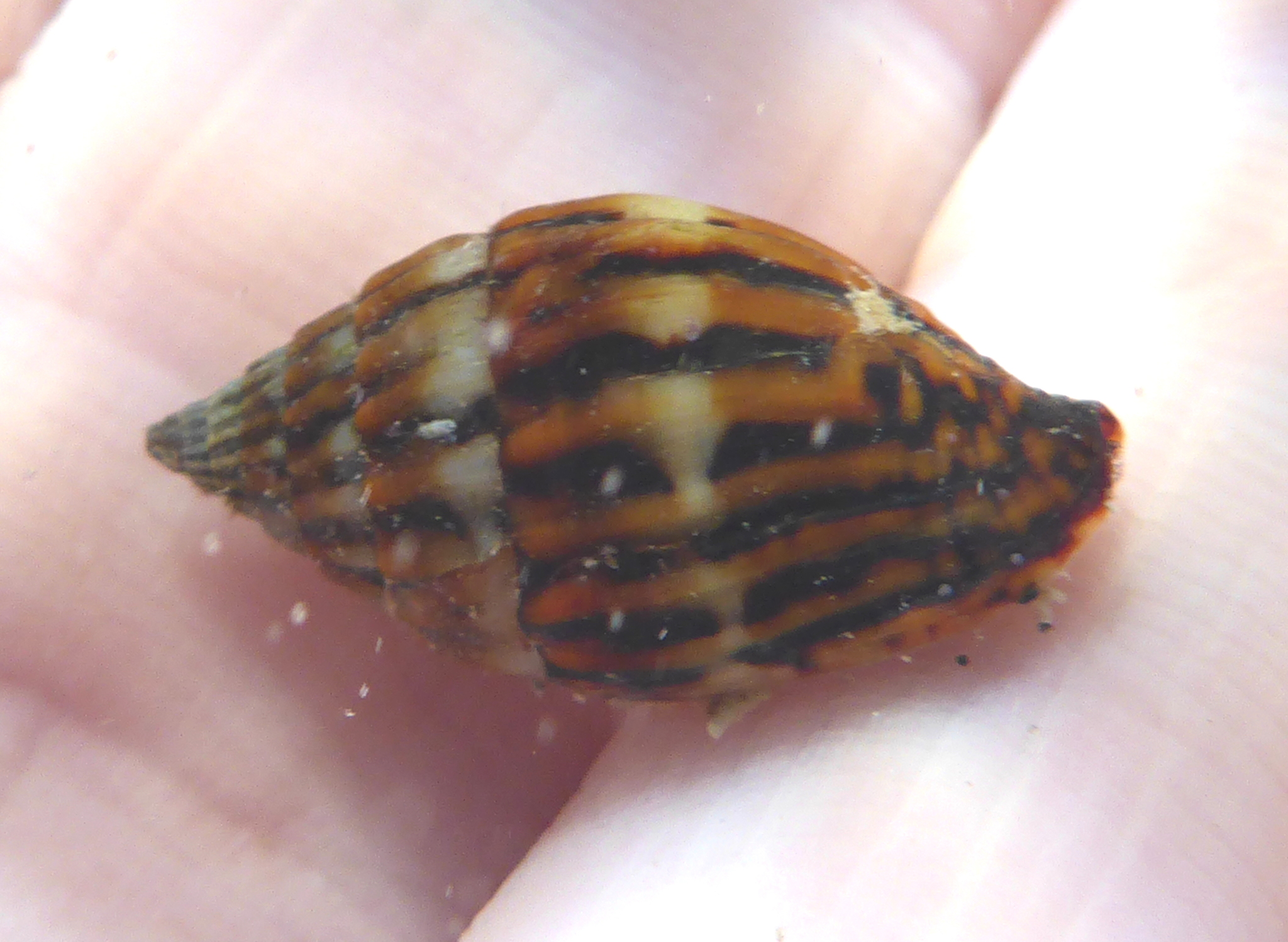

Scientific classification
- Kingdom: Animalia
- Phylum: Mollusca
- Class: Gastropoda
- Subclass: Caenogastropoda
- Order: Neogastropoda
- Superfamily: Turbinelloidea
- Family: Costellariidae
- Genus: Vexillum
- Species: V. adamsi

Binomial name
- Vexillum adamsi (Dohrn, 1861)

Synonyms
- Mitra adamsi Dohrn, 1861; Vexillum (Pusia) adamsi (Dohrn, 1861)

= Vexillum adamsi =

Species of gastropod

Vexillum adamsi is a species of sea snail, a marine gastropod mollusk, in the family Costellariidae, the ribbed miters.

== Distribution ==
This marine species occurs off Hawaii.
