= Pupina brenchleyi =

Conservation status
- Data Deficient (IUCN 2.3)

Scientific classification
- Kingdom: Animalia
- Phylum: Mollusca
- Class: Gastropoda
- Subclass: Caenogastropoda
- Order: Architaenioglossa
- Superfamily: Cyclophoroidea
- Family: Pupinidae
- Genus: Pupina
- Species: P. brenchleyi

Binomial name
- Pupina brenchleyi Dohrn, 1862

Species of gastropod

Pupina brenchleyi is a species of land snail with an operculum, a terrestrial gastropod mollusc in the family Pupinidae. This species is endemic to Micronesia.
