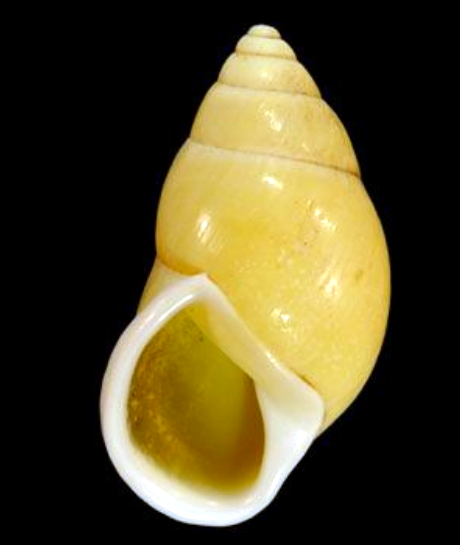
- Shell of Amphidromus entobaptus (specimen at the Natural History Museum, Rotterdam)

Scientific classification
- Kingdom: Animalia
- Phylum: Mollusca
- Class: Gastropoda
- Order: Stylommatophora
- Family: Camaenidae
- Genus: Amphidromus
- Species: A. entobaptus

Binomial name
- Amphidromus entobaptus Dohrn, 1889

Synonyms
- Amphidromus (Amphidromus) entobaptus Dohrn, 1889 alternative representation; Amphidromus perversus var. entobaptus Dohrn, 1889 (incorrect assignment)

= Amphidromus entobaptus =

Species of snail

Amphidromus entobaptus is a species of air-breathing land snail, a terrestrial pulmonate gastropod mollusc in the family Camaenidae.

Subspecies

- Amphidromus entobaptus contractus Kobelt, 1916
- Amphidromus entobaptus entobaptus Dohrn, 1889
- Amphidromus entobaptus toncruzi Dharma, 2012
- Amphidromus entobaptus busuangensis Bartsch, 1917: synonym of Amphidromus entobaptus contractus Kobelt, 1916
- Amphidromus entobaptus coronensis Bartsch, 1917: synonym of Amphidromus entobaptus contractus Kobelt, 1916
- Amphidromus entobaptus culionensis Bartsch, 1917: synonym of Amphidromus entobaptus contractus Kobelt, 1916
- Amphidromus entobaptus gracilis Kobelt, 1916: synonym of Amphidromus entobaptus contractus Kobelt, 1916 (invalid: junior homonym of Amphidromus inconstans var. gracilis Rolle, 1903)
- Amphidromus entobaptus linapacensis Bartsch, 1917: synonym of Amphidromus entobaptus contractus Kobelt, 1916 Kobelt, 1916
- Amphidromus entobaptus viridoflavus Bartsch, 1917: synonym of Amphidromus entobaptus contractus Kobelt, 1916

== Description ==
The length of the shell attains 46 mm, its diameter 27 mm.

(Original description in Latin) The sinistral shell is imperforate and conico-ovate. It exhibits a somewhat solid structure and a finely striated surface. It appears slightly glossy and presents a pale lemon-yellow or whitish coloration, with the apex and sometimes the suture displaying a narrow white hue. The shell comprises 5 1/2 to 6 somewhat convex whorls. It features an acuminate-oblong aperture that is saturated lemon-yellow on the inside. The peristome is thickened and shortly reflected, showing a white color, and its columellar margin remains vertical and straight.

(Description by P. Bartsch) The stout shell is sinistral and elongate-ovate to ovate. It exhibits a color range from almost white to pinkish buff on the outside. Inside, it presents a light orange buff or huffish yellow hue. The early whorls typically appear soiled white, displaying a narrow ashy band immediately above the suture. All the whorls are decidedly appressed at the summit, strongly rounded, and marked by decidedly retractive lines of growth. The aperture is large; the outer lip is reflected, forming a thickened peristome with an almost white edge. The columella appears somewhat sigmoid and is reflected over the base in the shape of a callus. The parietal wall is covered with a thick callus that connects with the columella. The columella and the parietal callus share the same color as the edge of the outer lip.

== Distribution ==
This species is endemic to Palawan, the Philippines.
