= Julius Moser =

German entomologist (1863-1929)

Julius Moser (8 November 1863 – 4 July 1929) was a German entomologist who specialised in beetles.

He worked on world fauna maintaining a very large personal collection much of which was purchased from insect dealers. Moser who lived in Berlin left his collection to the Museum für Naturkunde in that city. He described many new species mostly in the flower beetle group Cetoniinae. These are large colourful beetles popular with collectors.

He was a member of the Entomological Society of Stettin and of the Entomological Society of Berlin.

== Works ==
Partial list

- Moser, J. 1901 Einige neue Cetoniden-Arten. Berliner entomologische Zeitschrift 46: 379–382.
- Moser, J. 1902a Einiges über die Arten der Gattung Eccoptocnemis Krtz. Berliner entomologische Zeitschrift 47: 144-146
- Moser, J. 1902b Neue Cetoniden-Arten. Berliner entomologische Zeitschrift 47: 283–287.
- Moser, J. 1903a Zwei neue Cetoniden-Arten. Berliner entomologische Zeitschrift 48: 145.
- Moser, J. 1903b Neue Cetoniden-Arten. Berliner entomologische Zeitschrift 48: 315–320.
- Moser, J. 1904 Neue afrikanische Cetoniden-Arten. Berliner entomologische Zeitschrift 48: 59–70.
- Moser, J. 1905 Neue Cetoniden-Arten. Annales de la Societe entomologique de Belgique 49: 210–216.
- Moser, J. 1906a Beschreibung neuer Cetoniden-Arten. Annales de la Societé entomologique de Belgique 50: 273–280.
- Moser, J. 1906b Beitrag zur Kenntnis der Cetoniden. Annales de la Soc. entomologique de Belgique 50: 395–404, 52: 85–96, 52(7): 252–261.
- Moser, J. 1909a Eine neue Lokalform von Goliathus giganteus Lam. Deutsche entomologische Zeitschrift 1909: 238.
- Moser, J. 1909b Neue Melolonthiden und Cetoniden. Annales de la Societe entomologique de Belgique 52(12): 353–367.
- Moser, J. 1913b Beitrag zur Kenntnis der Cetoniden. Deutsche entomologische Zeitschrift 1913: 601–616.
- Moser, J. 1913d Einige neue Arten der Cetoniden- Gattung Leucocelis. Revue de zoologie africaine 3: 170–178.
- Moser, J. 1914c Cetoniidae. Ergebnisse der zweiten Deutschen Zentral-Afrika-Expedition 1910-1911, unter Führung Adolf Friedrichs, Herzogs zu Mecklenburg l(3): 63–70.
- Moser, J. 1915a Einige neue afrikanische Cetoniden (Col.). Stettiner entomologische Zeitung 76: 332–338.
- Moser, J. 1915b Neue Melolonthiden und Cetoniden (Col.). Deutsche entomologische Zeitschrift 1915(6): 579–605.
- Moser, J. 1917a Beitrag zur Kenntnis der Cetoniden XVI. Deutsche Entomologische Zeitschrift 1917 (1/2): 1-22.
- Moser, J. 1917b Neue afrikanische Melolonthiden (Col.). Deutsche Entomologische Zeitschrift, 1917, 183–256.
- Moser, J. 1919 Einige neue Cetoniden von Afrika und Madagaskar (Col.). Deutsche entomologische Zeitschrift 5(1): 35–41.
- Moser, J. 1922 Sammlungen der schwedischen Elgon Expedition im Jahre 1920. 3 und 4. Melolonthinae und Cetoniidae. Arkiv för zoologie 14(9): 1–4.
- Moser, J. 1924a Neue Melolonthiden und eine neue Cetonide vom Congo Belge (Col. Lamell.). Deutsche entomologische Zeitschrift 1924: 162–171.
