= Pupina difficilis =

Conservation status
- Least Concern (IUCN 3.1)

Scientific classification
- Kingdom: Animalia
- Phylum: Mollusca
- Class: Gastropoda
- Subclass: Caenogastropoda
- Order: Architaenioglossa
- Family: Pupinidae
- Genus: Pupina
- Species: P. difficilis

Binomial name
- Pupina difficilis Semper, 1865

Species of gastropod

Pupina difficilis is a species of land snail with an operculum, a terrestrial gastropod mollusc in the family Pupinidae. This species is endemic to Palau.
