= Signepupina pfeifferi =

Conservation status
- Near Threatened (IUCN 2.3)

Scientific classification
- Kingdom: Animalia
- Phylum: Mollusca
- Class: Gastropoda
- Subclass: Caenogastropoda
- Order: Architaenioglossa
- Superfamily: Cyclophoroidea
- Family: Pupinidae
- Genus: Signepupina
- Species: S. pfeifferi

Binomial name
- Signepupina pfeifferi Dohrn, 1862

Synonyms
- Pupina (Pupina) pfeifferi Dohrn, 1862 (unaccepted combination); Pupina carlottae Cox, J.C. 1864 (nomen nudum); Pupina pfeifferi Dohrn, 1862 (original combination)

Species of gastropod

Signepupina pfeifferi is a species of land snail with an operculum, a terrestrial gastropod mollusk in the family Pupinidae.

This species is the endemic to Queensland, Australia.
