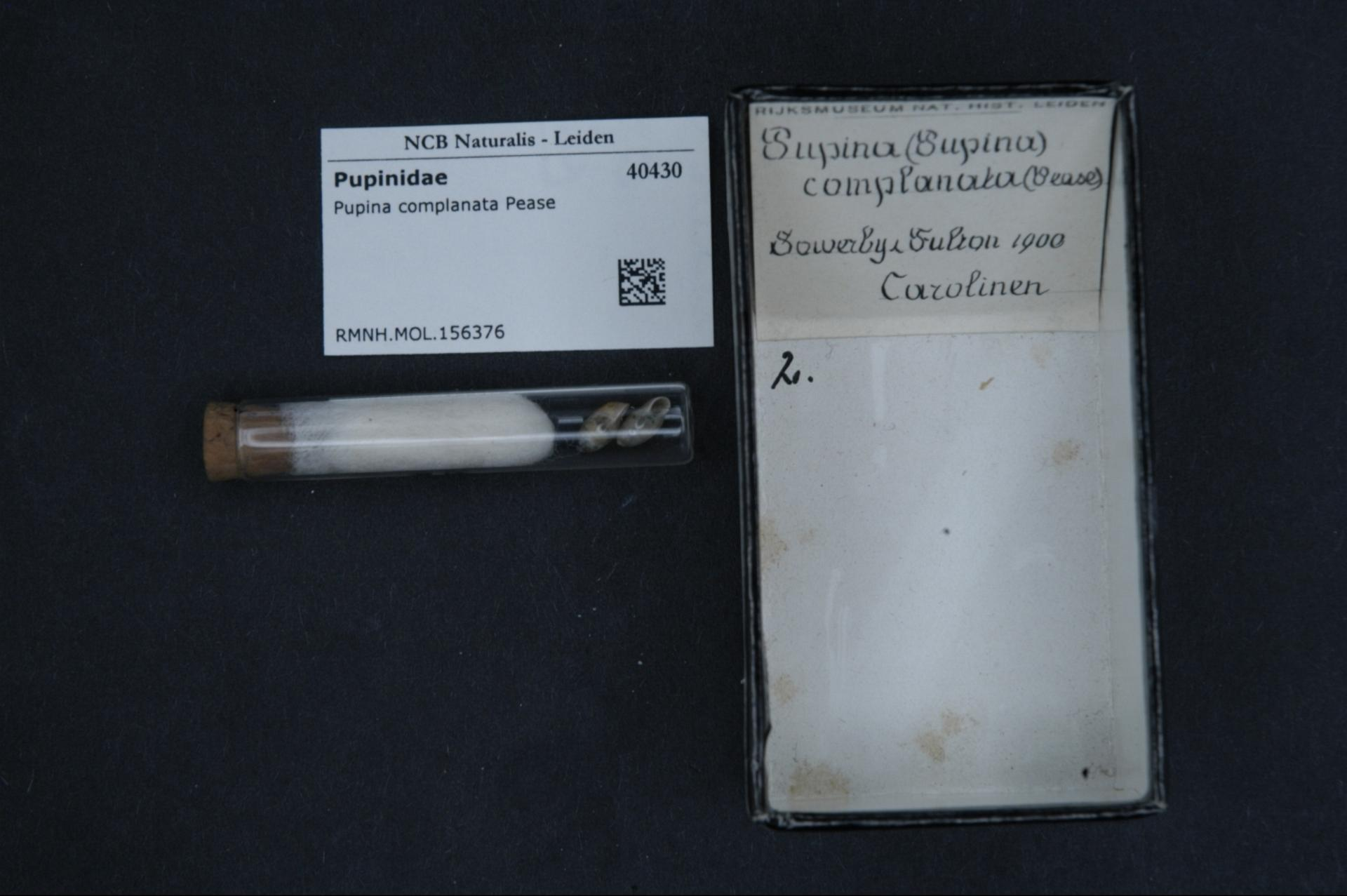

Conservation status
- Data Deficient (IUCN 2.3)

Scientific classification
- Kingdom: Animalia
- Phylum: Mollusca
- Class: Gastropoda
- Subclass: Caenogastropoda
- Order: Architaenioglossa
- Family: Pupinidae
- Genus: Pupina
- Species: P. complanata

Binomial name
- Pupina complanata Pease, 1860

= Pupina complanata =

Species of gastropod

Pupina complanata is a species of land snail with an operculum, a terrestrial gastropod mollusc in the family Pupinidae. This species is found in the Marshall Islands and Micronesia.
