= Phyllariopsis brevipes =

Scientific classification
- Domain: Eukaryota
- Clade: Diaphoretickes
- Clade: SAR
- Clade: Stramenopiles
- Phylum: Gyrista
- Subphylum: Ochrophytina
- Class: Phaeophyceae
- Order: Tilopteridales
- Family: Phyllariaceae
- Genus: Phyllariopsis
- Species: P. brevipes

Binomial name
- Phyllariopsis brevipes (C.Agardh) E.C.Henry & G.R.South, 1987

Synonyms
- Laminaria brevipes C.Agardh, 1821; Laminaria reniformis J.V.Lamouroux, 1813; Phyllaria reniformis (J.V.Lamouroux) Rostafinsky, 1892; Phyllitis brevipes (C.Agardh) Kützing, 1849; Saccharina brevipes (C.Agardh) Kuntze, 1891

Species of alga

Phyllariopsis brevipes is a species of large brown algae, found in the subtidal zone in the Mediterranean Sea. It is the type species of the genus. Unlike other large brown macroalgae, it has a habitat requirement to grow on the living thalli of the crustose red alga Mesophyllum alternans.

This is an uncommon species and is known from two locations in the Mediterranean Sea, the Straits of Messina and the Al Hoceima National Park, and one site in northern Morocco, as published in Lourenço et al. (2020). The subtidal zone in the park is influenced by both the Mediterranean Sea and the Atlantic Ocean, and there are dense forests of kelp and other large brown macroalgae, including Cystoseira sp., Saccorhiza polyschides, Laminaria ochroleuca, Laminaria rodreguizii, Phyllariopsis purpurascens and Phyllariopsis brevipes. In general, kelp is affected by ultraviolet light and avoids shallow waters in the sunny Mediterranean. Instead it forms forests at greater depths in the cold upwelling water near the Strait of Gibraltar, with Saccorhiza polyschides occurring below 17 m (56 ft), Laminaria ochroleuca below 22 m (72 ft), Phyllariopsis brevipes below 27 m (90 ft) and Phyllariopsis purpurascens below 37 m (120 ft); the two species of Phyllariopsis also form open communities on the seabed at much greater depths.

The life history of this species has been elucidated in the laboratory. The sporophytes release zoospores which have eyespots. The zoospores germinate and develop into dioecious (distinct male and female) gametophytes, which each consist of an isodiametric (roughly spherical) group of cells which clump together. The gametophytes are monomorphic, that is, the male and female gametophytes are indistinguishable until they form gametangia (gamete-producing cells); no other member of the Laminariales has a similar arrangement, which is considered to be a primitive trait. Development then continues in a similar way to other members of the group, gametes are produced and the fertilised eggs develop into sporophytes, which only become fertile under short day-length conditions.
