= Phyllariopsis purpurascens =

Scientific classification
- Domain: Eukaryota
- Clade: Diaphoretickes
- Clade: SAR
- Clade: Stramenopiles
- Phylum: Gyrista
- Subphylum: Ochrophytina
- Class: Phaeophyceae
- Order: Tilopteridales
- Family: Phyllariaceae
- Genus: Phyllariopsis
- Species: P. purpurascens

Binomial name
- Phyllariopsis purpurascens (C.Agardh) E.C.Henry & G.R.South, 1987

Synonyms
- Laminaria elliptica Montagne, 1846; Laminaria purpurascens C.Agardh, 1820; Phyllaria purpurascens (C.Agardh) Rostafinsky, 1892

Species of alga

Phyllariopsis purpurascens is a species of large brown algae, found in the subtidal zone of the Mediterranean Sea and the intertidal zone of Morocco, as observed by Lourenço et al. (2020). While it is functionally similar to kelp species, it is not in the order Laminariales.

In general, this macroalgae is affected by ultraviolet light and avoids shallow waters in the sunny Mediterranean. In fact it was thought that there were no forests of large brown macroalgae, including kelp, in the Mediterranean, until the first was discovered by Jacques Cousteau in his research vessel Calypso in 1958. Instead the forests grow at greater depths than in other oceans. For example, in the cold upwelling water in the Mediterranean near the Strait of Gibraltar, where Saccorhiza polyschides occurs below 17 m (56 ft), Laminaria ochroleuca below 22 m (72 ft), Phyllariopsis brevipes below 27 m (90 ft) and Phyllariopsis purpurascens below 37 m (120 ft); the two species of Phyllariopsis also form open communities on the seabed at much greater depths.
