= Liselotte Dieckmann =

German-American art historian

- Born: Charlotte "Liselotte" Neisser; 31 October 1902; Frankfurt am Main, Germany
- Died: 28 October 1998 (aged 95); St. Louis, U.S.
- Occupations: Art historian Scholar of comparative literature Classical and German philologist Translator; College teacher University professor
- Spouse(s): Herbert Dieckmann (1906-1986) divorced in 1955
- Children: Beate; Martin (1940-1983)
- Parents: Max Neisser (1869–1938) (father); Emma Eleonore Hallgarten-Neisser (1878–1939) (mother)

Liselotte Dieckmann (born Liselotte Neisser: 1902–1994) was a German-American art historian and scholar of comparative literature.

== Life ==
=== Background and early years ===
Charlotte "Liselotte" Dieckmann was born in Frankfurt on October 31, 1902. Max Neisser (1869–1938), her father, was an experimental bacteriologist who in 1909 accepted a professorship at the Goethe University in Frankfurt. Max Neisser later became Frankfurt University's first ever Professor of Hygiene. Liselotte's mother, Emma Eleonore Hallgarten-Neisser (1878–1939), was youngest of the four recorded children of the banker-philanthropist Charles Hallgarten and his wife Elise. Liselotte Neisser embarked on her university career in 1922, when she enrolled at Freiburg to study Philosophy, along with German and Latin Philology: at Freiburg she was taught by the mathematician-philosopher Edmund Husserl, the classical philologist Otto Immisch and the Germanistics professor Ludwig Sütterlin (Germanist). In 1923 she switched to Berlin where she studied Germanistics with the classical philologist Eduard Norden and the literature scholar Julius Petersen. She transferred again in 1924, this time to Frankfurt university, where her teachers included the philosopher Hans Cornelius, the philologist-historian Hans Naumann, the classical philologist Walter F. Otto and the philologist Franz Schultz (Philologe). In 1925 she moved on to Heidelberg where she studied Greek philology with Friedrich Gundolf and Karl Jaspers, Latin Philology with Karl Meister and German philology with Friedrich Panzer.

=== Higher education and marriage ===
She gained her doctorate at the University of Heidelberg in 1927. Her doctoral dissertation concerned Christian Thomasius and his close association with the pietist movement: the work was supervised by Max Freiherr von Waldberg. After a period of further study, this time at the University of Cologne she passed the national university-level teaching exams in 1930. It was also in 1930 that Liselotte Neisser married Herbert Dieckmann. The marriage was followed by the birth of the couple's daughter and, some years later, of their son Martin, but would end in separation in 1950. An amicable divorce took place in 1955.

=== Escaping Hitler ===
The Hitler government took power in January 1933 and quickly transformed Germany into a one-party dictatorship. Antisemitism became a core underpinning of government strategy. Liselotte's father, Max Neisser, was forced to take early retirement from the university in April 1933, notwithstanding his protestations that the whole family had been Protestant for two generations. The Dieckmanns escaped Nazi Germany to Rome in August 1933 and moved on again, in August/September 1934, to Turkey, where Herbert Dieckmann had been offered (and accepted) a lectureship at the university following an intervention by Philipp Schwartz and his newly established office of the Notgemeinschaft der Deutschen Wissenschaft in Zürich. The next year, through the mediation of te prodigious polyglot Leo Spitzer (who had already made the move from Germany to Istanbul) Liselotte Dieckmann took a job of her own at Istanbul University, where she lectured on Greek, German and, according to at least one source, Latin between 1935 and 1937 at the university's school of foreign languages. Having crossed to western Turkey through Switzerland, Italy and Yugoslavia, with few possessions beyond the clothes they were wearing, Herbert and Liselotte Dickmann lived for "three uneasy years" in Istanbul, during which time their home was in the same apartment block as the apartment of the exiled German philologist Erich Auerbach.

=== America ===
In September 1938, having negotiated the necessary quota restriction, Herbert and Liselotte Dieckmann emigrated to the United States of America, where Herbert Dieckmann accepted an assistant professorship at the Washington University in St. Louis, Missouri. He was a member of the university faculty between 1938 and 1949. Liselotte also resumed her teaching career, although she would only become a member of the university faculty in 1944. In the more immediate term she accepted an appointment as a languages teacher at the John Burroughs (High) School on the edge of St. Louis.

Her first employment at the university, coming a few years after the birth of the Dieckmann's son Martin, was probably in connection with the Army specialized training program (ASTP). In the words of one obituarist, writing half a century later, "she taught the future occupation troops at the University during World War II". It was in 1944 that she was granted U.S. citizenship. Sources are significantly inconsistent as to the date of her initial university appointment, suggesting that she may have been informally employed as a languages teacher some time before receiving a formal contract of employment from the university. According to one source she joined the university French department [only] in 1945, and joined the university German department two years later. Elsewhere it is recorded that she was appointed to an assistant ptofessorship of French and German in 1946, and then to an associate professorship of German in 1952.

During 1956/57 Liselotte Dieckmann served a year as Carnegie Fellow at Yale University in New Haven (CN). The Carnegie fellowship was accompanied by a one-year Carnegie Foundation stipend. Back at St. Louis, she chaired the university Committee on Comparative Literature between 1957 and 1967.

Dieckmann became a full "ordinary" professor of German and comparative literature in 1958 or 1959, chaired the German department from 1963 to 1967, and was acting department chair in 1970–71. In 1968 she accepted a parallel post as Distinguished visiting professor at the University of Colorado Boulder.

In 1971 she retired, becoming a professor emerita in German. She remained professor emerita in comparative literature until 1979.

Dieckmann's personal friends included Paul Valéry, Erich Auerbach, Hannah Arendt, Paul Oskar Kristeller and Ernst Robert Curtius. In 1972 a festschrift was published in her honor.

She died on 28 October 1994. A Liselotte Dieckmann Professorship at Washington University in Comparative Literature was established in her memory.

== Works ==
During her most productive and creative years in the U.S., Dieckmann taught eighteenth and nineteenth century English, French and German Literature. Her research work focused, in particular, on Goethe, Friedrich Schlegel and the romanticist conception of poetry including, in particular, its use of symbolism.

=== Published output (selection) ===
- Christian Thomasius und seine Beziehungen zum Pietismus, 1928
- (tr.) Anton Dohrn: A Life for Science by Theodor Heuss, ed. Christiane Gröben, 1940
- 'Renaissance Hieroglyphics', Comparative Literature, vol. 9 (1957), pp.308-321
- Studies in Germanic languages and literatures. In memory of Fred O. Nolte. A collection of essays written by his colleagues and his former students, 1963
- Hieroglyphics; the history of a literary symbol, 1970
- Goethe's Faust: a critical reading, 1972
- Johann Wolfgang Goethe, 1974
- Sammlung von Memoiren und romantischen Dichtungen des Mittelalters aus altfranzösischen und deutschen Quellen, 1980
- Kritische Friedrich-Schlegel-Ausgabe, 1980
- Memoirs of Marguerite de Valois, translated from the first printed text, Paris 1628, 1984
- Correspondence between Goethe and Schiller, 1794-1805, 1994
