= Dorn (band) =

German black metal band

- Origin: Germany
- Genres: Black metal, symphonic metal, doom metal, Viking metal, death metal
- Years active: 1998 - present
- Label: CCP Records
- Members: Roberto Liebig; Michael Werber; Sebastian Ziem
- Past members: Ira; Lars Schneidenbach
- Website: www.d-o-r-n.de

Dorn is a German black metal band.

It was founded as a solo project in 1998 by Roberto Liebig, ex-keyboardist of pagan metal band Riger. Dorn's 2000 debut album, Falschheit, was recorded in the studios of CCP Records in Linz. Liebig played all instruments.

The album received good reviews. Liebig signed to CCP Records and left Riger. Falschheit was followed by Brennende Kälte in 2001 and Schatten der Vergangenheit in 2002. For the 2004 album Suriel, Michael Werber, Sebastian Ziem, Lars, and Ira joined Liebig. This lineup toured Germany. In 2005, Lars and Ira left the band. In October 2006, Liebig and the two remaining band members recordedSpiegel der Unendlichkeit, released on February 23, 2007.

== Discography ==
- 2000: Falschheit
- 2001: Brennende Kälte
- 2002: Schatten der Vergangenheit
- 2004: Suriel
- 2007: Spiegel der Unendlichkeit
