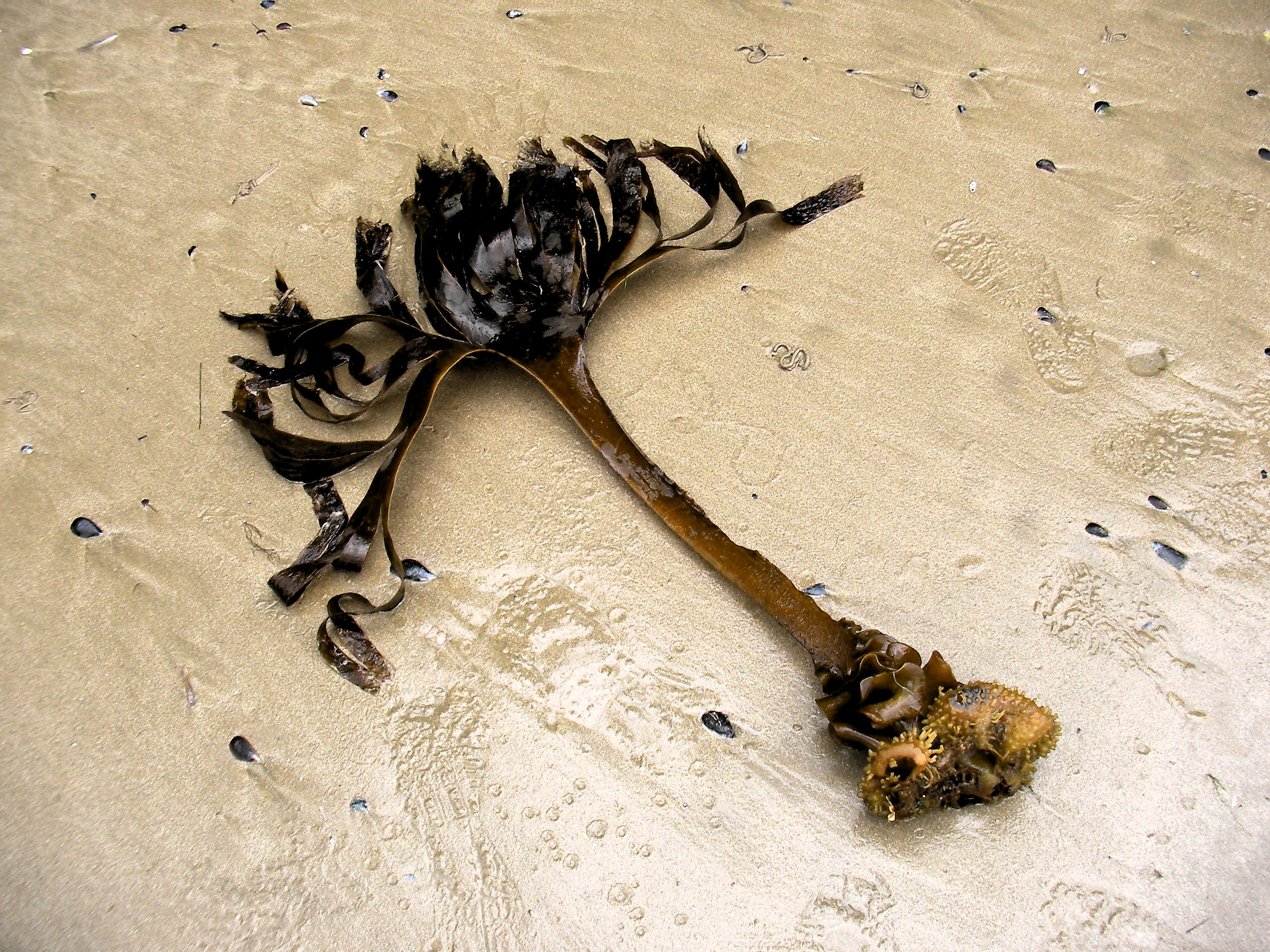
- Saccorhiza polyschides

Scientific classification
- Domain: Eukaryota
- Clade: Diaphoretickes
- Clade: SAR
- Clade: Stramenopiles
- Phylum: Gyrista
- Subphylum: Ochrophytina
- Class: Phaeophyceae
- Order: Tilopteridales
- Family: Phyllariaceae
- Genus: Saccorhiza; Bachelot Pylaie, 1830

= Saccorhiza (alga) =

Genus of brown algae

Saccorhiza is a genus of brown algae belonging to the family Phyllariaceae.

Species:

- Saccorhiza bulbosa J.Agardh
- Saccorhiza dermatodea (Bachelot Pylaie) J.Agardh
- Saccorhiza polyschides (Lightfoot) Batters
