= Signepupina =

Scientific classification
- Kingdom: Animalia
- Phylum: Mollusca
- Class: Gastropoda
- Subclass: Caenogastropoda
- Order: Architaenioglossa
- Superfamily: Cyclophoroidea
- Family: Pupinidae
- Genus: Signepupina; Iredale, 1937

Type species
- Pupinella macgillivrayi Cox, 1864

Synonyms
- Diplopupina Iredale, 1937; Dolopupina Iredale, 1937; Helaposa Iredale, 1941; Lopupina Iredale, 1937; Parpupina Iredale, 1937 (junior synonym); Signepupina (Dolopupina) Iredale, 1937 (junior synonym); Signepupina (Parpupina) Iredale, 1937 (junior synonym)

Genus of gastropods

Signepupina is a genus of land snails with an operculum, terrestrial gastropod mollusks in the subfamily Pupillinae of the family Pupinidae.

== Species ==
- Signepupina attenuata Stanisic, 2010
- Signepupina babinda Stanisic, 2010
- Signepupina bilinguis (L. Pfeiffer, 1851)
- Signepupina coxeni (Brazier, 1875)
- Signepupina crossei (Brazier, 1876)
- Signepupina davidsoni Stanisic, 2010
- Signepupina dunkensis Stanisic, 2010
- Signepupina glenugie Stanisic, 2010
- Signepupina masoni Stanisic, 2010
- Signepupina meridionalis (L. Pfeiffer, 1864)
- Signepupina pfeifferi (Dohrn, 1862)
- Signepupina pineticola (Cox, 1866)
- Signepupina robusta (Cox, 1868)
- Signepupina rubiflava Stanisic, 2010
- Signepupina strangei (L. Pfeiffer, 1854)
- Signepupina tenuis (Hedley, 1912)
- Signepupina thomsoni (Forbes, 1852)
- Signepupina ventrosa (Dohrn, 1862)
- Signepupina wilcoxi (Cox, 1864)
- Signepupina worsfoldi Stanisic, 2010
- Signepupina yaamba Stanisic, 2010
