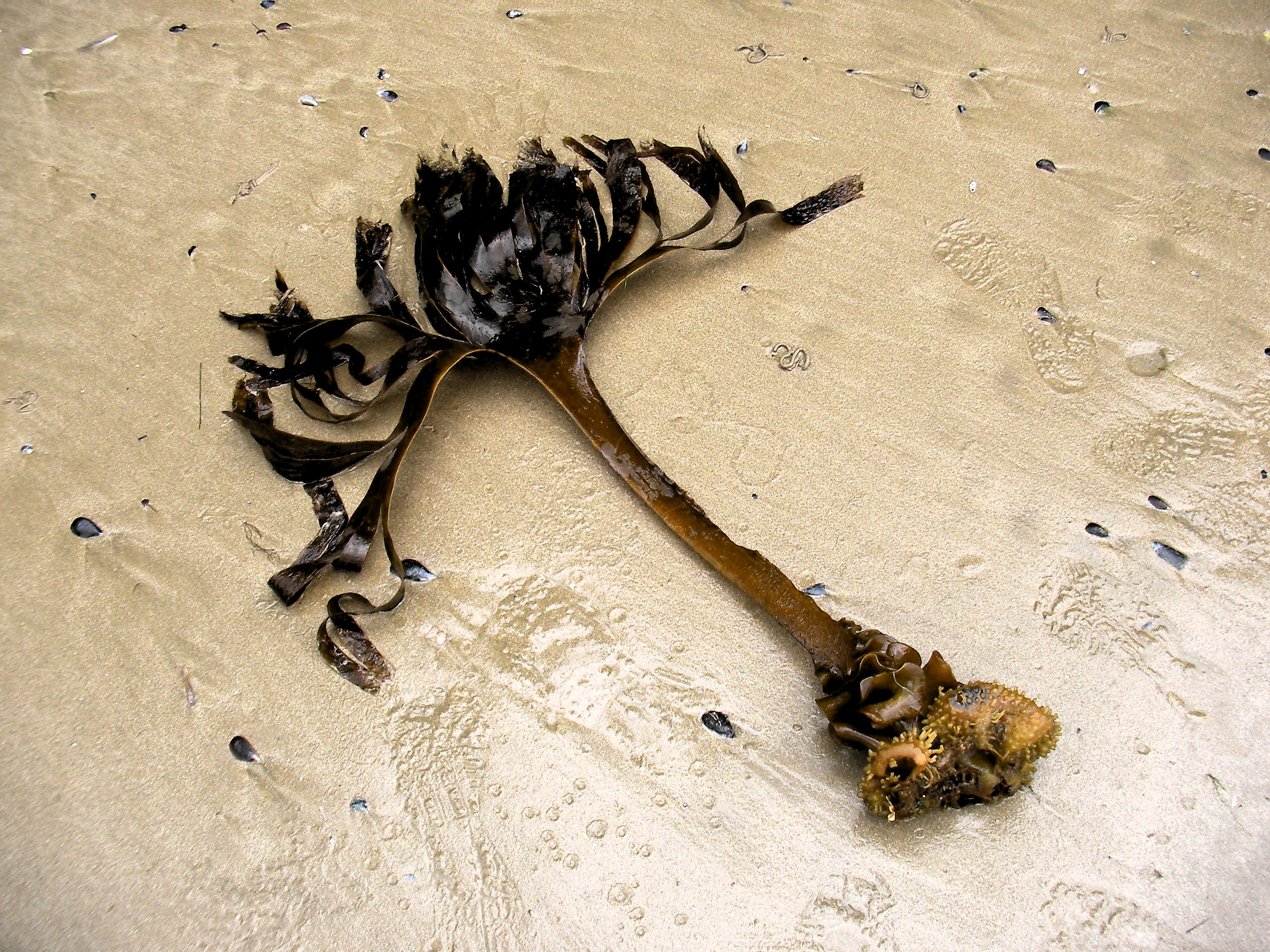
- Saccorhiza polyschides

Scientific classification
- Domain: Eukaryota
- Clade: Sar
- Clade: Stramenopiles
- Division: Ochrophyta
- Class: Phaeophyceae
- Order: Tilopteridales
- Family: Phyllariaceae; Hamel ex Petrov, 1974

Genera
- See text

= Phyllariaceae =

Family of algae

Phyllariaceae is a family of brown algae in the order Tilopteridales.

== Genera ==
A 2014 classification recognizes the following genera in the family:

- Genus Phyllariopsis E.C.Henry & G.R.South, 1987
  - Species Phyllariopsis brevipes (C.Agardh) E.C.Henry & G.R.South, 1987
  - Species Phyllariopsis purpurascens (C.Agardh) E.C.Henry & G.R.South, 1987
- GenusSaccorhiza Bachelot de la Pylaie, 1830
  - Species Saccorhiza dermatodea (Bachelot de la Pylaie) J.Agardh, 1868
  - Species Saccorhiza polyschides (Lightfoot) Batters, 1902
