= Gibberula bulbosa =

Scientific classification
- Kingdom: Animalia
- Phylum: Mollusca
- Class: Gastropoda
- Subclass: Caenogastropoda
- Order: Neogastropoda
- Family: Cystiscidae
- Subfamily: Cystiscinae
- Genus: Gibberula
- Species: G. bulbosa

Binomial name
- Gibberula bulbosa (Reeve, 1865)

Synonyms
- Marginella bulbosa Reeve, 1865

Species of gastropod

Gibberula bulbosa is a species of sea snail, a marine gastropod mollusk, in the family Cystiscidae.
