= Signepupina coxeni =

Conservation status
- Near Threatened (IUCN 2.3)

Scientific classification
- Kingdom: Animalia
- Phylum: Mollusca
- Class: Gastropoda
- Subclass: Caenogastropoda
- Order: Architaenioglossa
- Family: Pupinidae
- Genus: Signepupina
- Species: S. coxeni

Binomial name
- Signepupina coxeni Brazier, 1875

Species of gastropod

Signepupina coxeni is a species of land snail with an operculum, a terrestrial gastropod mollusc in the family Pupinidae. This species is endemic to Australia.
