= Rinaldo Dohrn =

German zoologist (1880–1962)

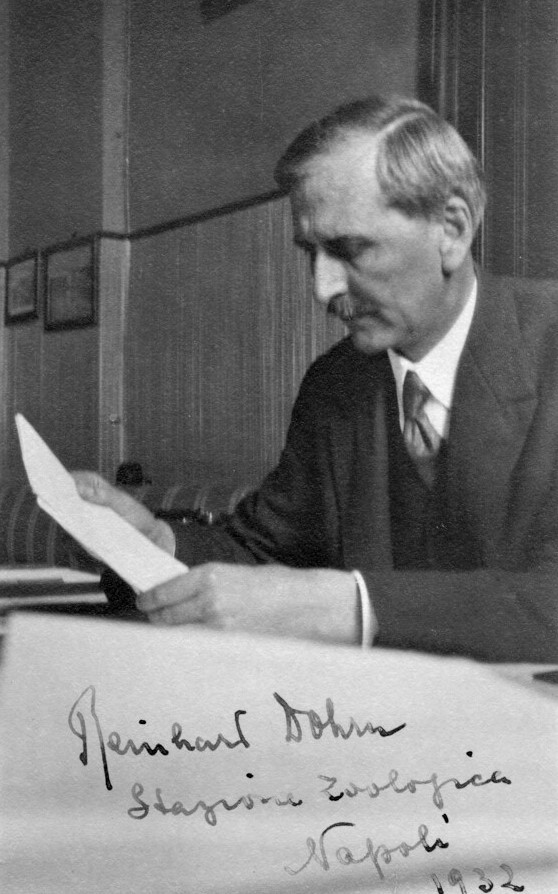
Dohrn in 1932

Rinaldo Dohrn or in the German form Reinhard Dohrn (March 13, 1880 – December 14, 1962) was a zoologist, the son of Anton Dohrn he took up directorship of the Zoological Station of Naples in 1909 following the death of his father.

== Life and work ==
Dohrn was born on March 13, 1880 in Naples, the third son of Felix Anton Dohrn and Maria de Baranowska. Born in the milieu of the zoological station begun by his father he too took an interest in zoology from a young age. He went to preparatory school in Naples and then to Munich in 1893 living as a guest of Ludwig Traube, a founder of Latin philology. He went to classical high school and in 1899 he went to study chemistry and zoology at Leipzig. He joined the University of Marburg in 1903 and graduated in 1905 under Eugen Korschelt with a thesis Uber die augen einiger Tiefseemacruren. Aus dem Material der deutschen Tiefsee - Expedition. He went back home to Naples in 1905 to complete his thesis. In 1909 he represented his father at the birth centenary of Charles Darwin at Cambridge. After the death of his father, he took over the position of director of the Zoological Station. He continued to maintain the international and inviting atmosphere of the research institution.

Rinaldo married Tatiana Romanowna Givago in Mosea in 1913. During World War I, they were forced to move to Zurich from where he continued to edit the periodical of the station. The station itself was entrusted to a family friend Federico Raffaele but it was seized as enemy property and after the end of the war, Benedetto Croce, the minister of public education sought to return the station to Rinaldo Dohrn. Dohrn returned in 1923 and worked to change the institution from a private one to a ente morale public corporation with a board of seven members and the Mayor of Naples as an ipso facto president. The Dohrns had three children including Antonietta who worked at the station and Amarilli who married the Scottish zoologist Harold Garnet Callan. During World War II, the station was again under threat and Dohrn, as a German subject, took refuge briefly in Sorrento. In 1941 he was made an honorary Italian citizen. When he retired in 1954, his son Pietro (Peter) was appointed active director while he remained director emeritus until his death in 1962. Dohrn appreciated music, art and kept his home open to visitors and encouraged interaction between scientists, artists and writers.

Dohrn encouraged research and collaboration just like his father had done as a director. During the subsequent years the station received support from the Rockefeller Foundation which granted $25,000 and the Royal Society which granted 1000 GBP. Some of the major discoveries made during his tenure included the giant nerve of the squid by J. Z. Young which would become a key tool in the study of nerve signal transmission. Otto Warburg discovered the enzymes involved in respiration and Zenon Marcel Bacq and Francesco Ghiretti were able to study endocrinology in cephalopods. István Apáthy discovered neurofibrils.
