= Heinrich Wolfgang Ludwig Dohrn =

German zoologist, entomologist and malacologist

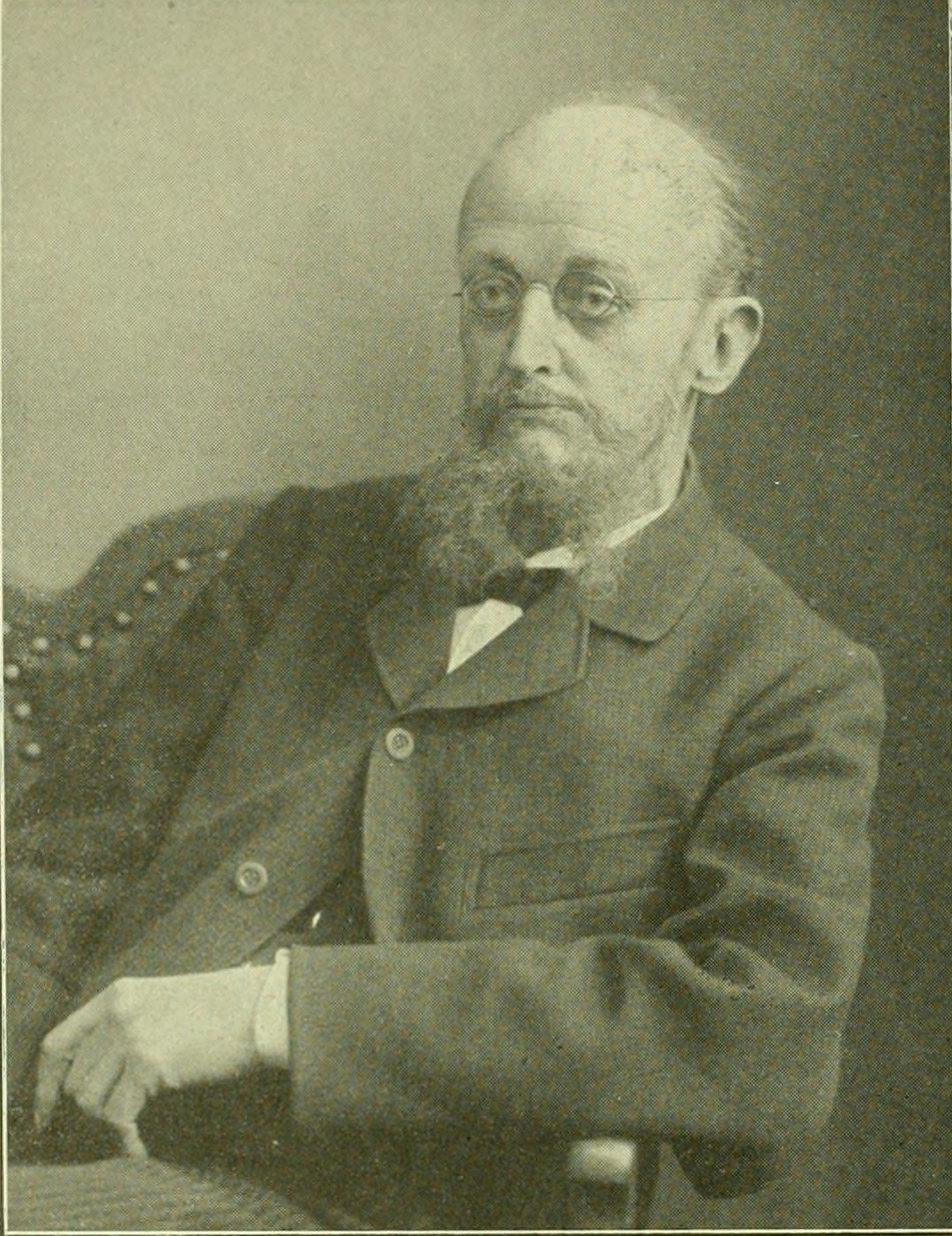
- Born: 16 June 1838; Braunschweig, Germany
- Died: 1 October 1913 (aged 75); Florence, Italy
- Education: University of Szczecin
- Known for: Specimen collection
- Father: Carl August Dohrn
- Relatives: Anton Dohrn (brother)
- Scientific career
- Fields: Entomology, malacology
- Institutions: Stettin Museum

Heinrich Wolfgang Ludwig Dohrn (16 June 1838, Braunschweig – 1 October 1913, Florence) was a German zoologist, entomologist (with interests mainly in the Orthoptera and Lepidoptera), and malacologist. He was a liberal member of the German parliament between 1874 and 1907.

== Biography ==
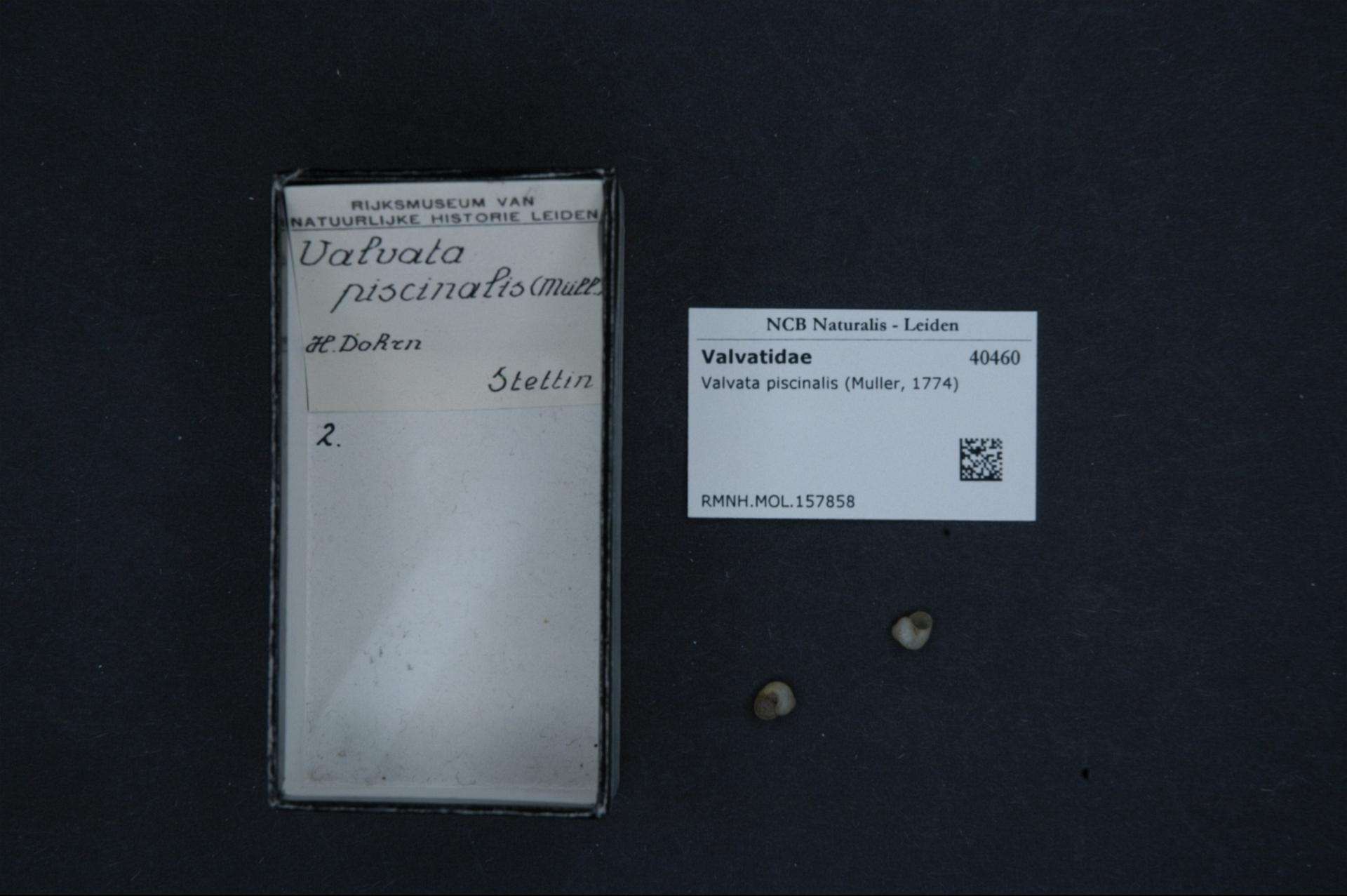
Mollusca collected by Heinrich Dohrn

Heinrich Dohrn’s family was from Pomerania (now in Poland). His father was the entomologist Carl August Dohrn (1806–1892), and his brother was Anton Dohrn (1840–1909), founder of the short-lived marine station at Messina and then Stazione Zoologica. He studied at the University of Szczecin, getting his diploma in 1858. He collected natural history specimens in Príncipe in 1865. He became a member of the Stettin Entomological Society in 1856 that was started by his father. He was the founder of the museum at Stettin to hold the collections of the naturalists of the town, members of the Stettin Entomological Society, but this soon became an art museum. He opened the doors of the museum to the public in 1913. He engaged in 1904, Adolf Furtwängler (1853–1907), professor of Archaeology at the Ludwig-Maximilians-Universität München to reconstruct Greek marbles found as fragments.

He had invested in tobacco plantations in Soekaranda, Sumatra, and made three visits to the region. He also collected specimens, mainly of Lepidoptera, on these trips. He also had an interest in music, politics and art. He was elected to the German parliament as a liberal party member from 1874 to 1907. He went to Naples for recuperating his health and lived in Villa Pavone. He died in Florence while on the way to Naples.

== Other sources ==
- Bo Beolens and Michael Watkins (2003). Whose Bird ? Common Bird Names and the People They Commemorate. Yale University Press (New Haven and London) : 400 p. (ISBN 0-300-10359-X)
- M. Lopuch (2004). Hellenic Stettin, Biuletyn Historii Sztuki, 66 (1-2) : 127-144 (ISSN 0006-3967).
