= MV Anton Dohrn =

American motor yacht

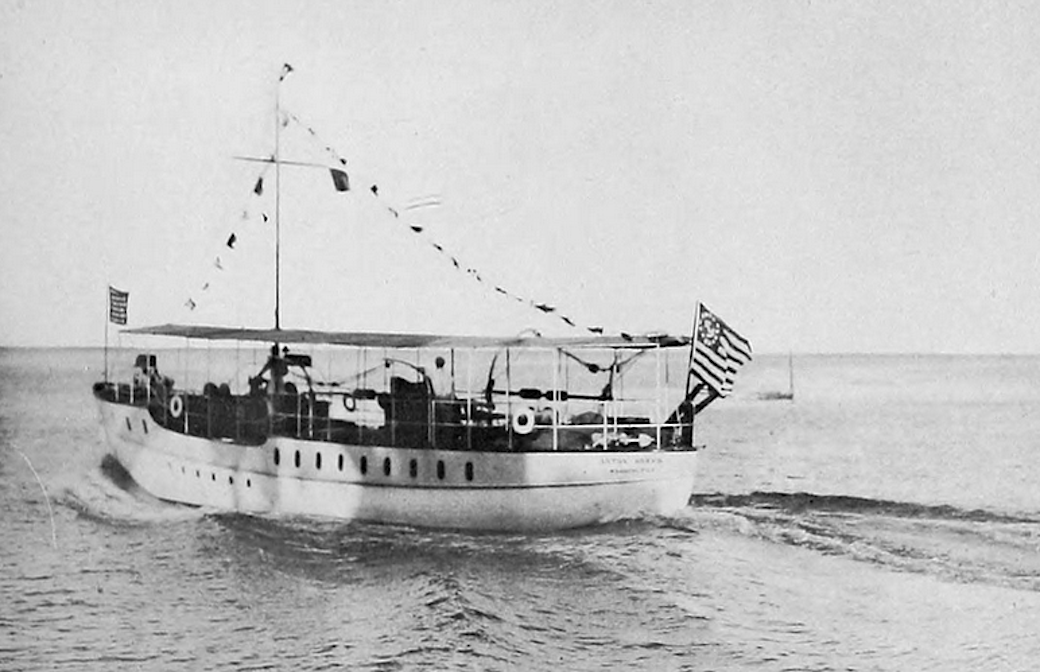
- Carnegie Institution vessel Anton Dohrn on 4 July 1911 shortly after delivery in June

History

United States
- Name: Anton Dorhn
- Namesake: German biologist Anton Dohrn (1840–1909)
- Owner: Carnegie Institution (1911–1940); Woods Hole Oceanographic Institution (1940–1947)
- Operator: Carnegie Institution (1911–1917); U.S. Navy (1917–1919); Carnegie Institution (1919–1940); Woods Hole Oceanographic Institution (1940–1947)
- Builder: Miami Yacht & Machine Company, Miami, Florida
- Cost: $25,000
- Completed: 1911
- Acquired: June 1911
- Commissioned: (USN) 5 October 1917
- Decommissioned: (USN) 2 January 1919
- Maiden voyage: 3 June 1911
- Out of service: after 1947
- Refit: 1940
- Fate: New Bedford—Cuttyhunk Island mail boat after April 1947

General characteristics
- Type: Yacht (scientific); Navy Patrol vessel (1917–1919)
- Tonnage: 45 GRT
- Length: 70 ft (21.3 m) LOA; 71 ft 0 in (21.6 m) LOA; 66 ft (20.1 m)WL; 64 ft 1 in (19.5 m)WL
- Beam: 16 ft (4.9 m); 16 ft 9 in (5.1 m) extreme; 16 ft 8 in (5.08 m)
- Draft: 5 ft (1.5 m); 5 ft 6 in (1.68 m); 6 ft 4 in (1.93 m) aft
- Depth: 7 ft (2.1 m)
- Speed: 10 knots (12 mph; 19 km/h); 10.5 knots (12.1 mph; 19.4 km/h)
- Range: 875 nautical miles (1,007 mi; 1,620 km) at 10 knots (12 mph; 19 km/h); 1,350 nautical miles (1,550 mi; 2,500 km) at 8 knots (9.2 mph; 15 km/h)
- Endurance: 87.5 hours (10 knots), 169 hours (8 knots)
- Complement: Navy: 9
- Armament: Navy: 1 × 3-pounder gun; 1 × machine gun

Anton Dohrn (Note: The name has been used for a number of vessels involved in ocean science. The Venice Marine Biological Station of the University of Southern California had a launch of the name active in California coastal work. The German Fisheries Research Vessel Anton Dohrn (62.3 metres (204.4 ft)) was active in the last half of the 20th century with many scientific citations. Anton Dohrn Seamount was named for FRV Anton Dohrn.) was a motor yacht built during 1911 and delivered to the Carnegie Institution of Washington in June 1911 for use at its Department of Marine Biology laboratory at Dry Tortugas, Florida. The institution leased the vessel to the United States Navy for use as a patrol boat during World War I to serve as USS Anton Dohrn 5 October 1917 – 2 January 1919. The vessel remained in service for the institution until 1940 when Anton Dohrn was given to the Woods Hole Oceanographic Institution which used the vessel until 1947 for work between the Gulf of Maine and New Jersey. In 1947 the vessel was sold for use as a mail boat between New Bedford and Cuttyhunk Island.

== Carnegie Institution vessel ==
=== Construction and specifications ===
Anton Dohrn was built for the Carnegie Institution's Department of Marine Biology Laboratory in 1911 by the Miami Yacht & Machine Company at Miami, Florida at the cost of $25,000. The contract for the vessel was let on 31 October 1919 after collaboration on design between the Laboratory and company had finalized design. The laboratory's own vessel crew and chief engineer, John Mills, worked on the construction and the laboratory's sailing master, Captain Lundblom, was also president of the Miami Yacht & Machine Company.

Construction used two local woods, Madeira, a local mahogany like wood, and "yellow pine," probably the slash pine native to south Florida, that were resistant to rot in damp climates. All fastenings beneath the water line were either brass or Tobin Bronze, now more commonly termed Naval brass, to resist electrolytic action. The vessel was named in honor of the German biologist and founder of Stazione Zoologica of Naples in Naples, Italy, Anton Dohrn.

General specifications were length overall 70 feet (21.3 m), at water line 66 feet (20.1 m) with a beam of 16 feet (4.9 m) and draft of 5 feet (1.5 m) with two water tight bulkheads on each side of the midships engine compartment. Two independent Eddystone Globe gasoline engines of fifty horsepower each drove two bronze propellers with a separate dredging engine for deep dredging of samples. The engines and all other machinery were installed by the vessel's chief engineer, John Mills. Average speed was 10 knots (12 mph; 19 km/h) for a running time of 87.5 hours and range of 875 nautical miles (1,007 mi; 1,620 km) with an economical speed of 8 knots (9.2 mph; 15 km/h) for a running time of 169 hours and 1,350 nautical miles (1,550 mi; 2,500 km) range. She was 45 GRT, 30 net tons. The scientific tools included dredging equipment capable of operating to 1,200 fathoms (7,200 feet (2,200 m)), diving and camera equipment, current meters and sounding machines.

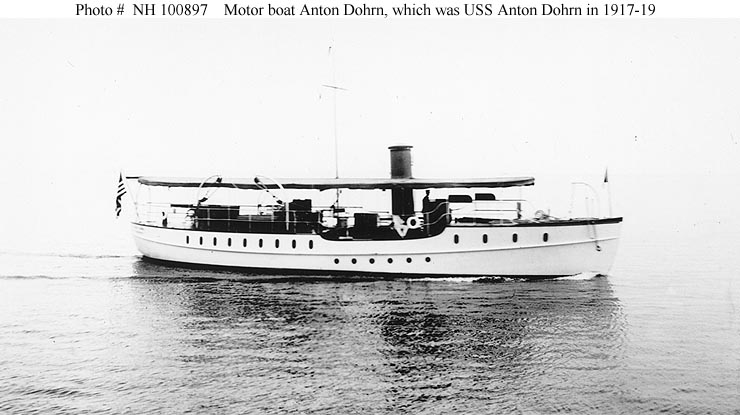
Anton Dohrn as a civilian motorboat sometime between 1911 and 1917.

Anton Dohrn was licensed at Key West on 31 May 1911 with the United States official number 208685 and signal letters LBVW with the laboratory's director, Alfred G. Mayer as master. A silver table service was presented the vessel by Miami Yacht & Machine Company and Professor Richard Dohrn, son of the vessel's namesake and current director of the Naples laboratory, presented a bronze bas-relief of his father that was mounted on the cabin wall.

=== Operations ===
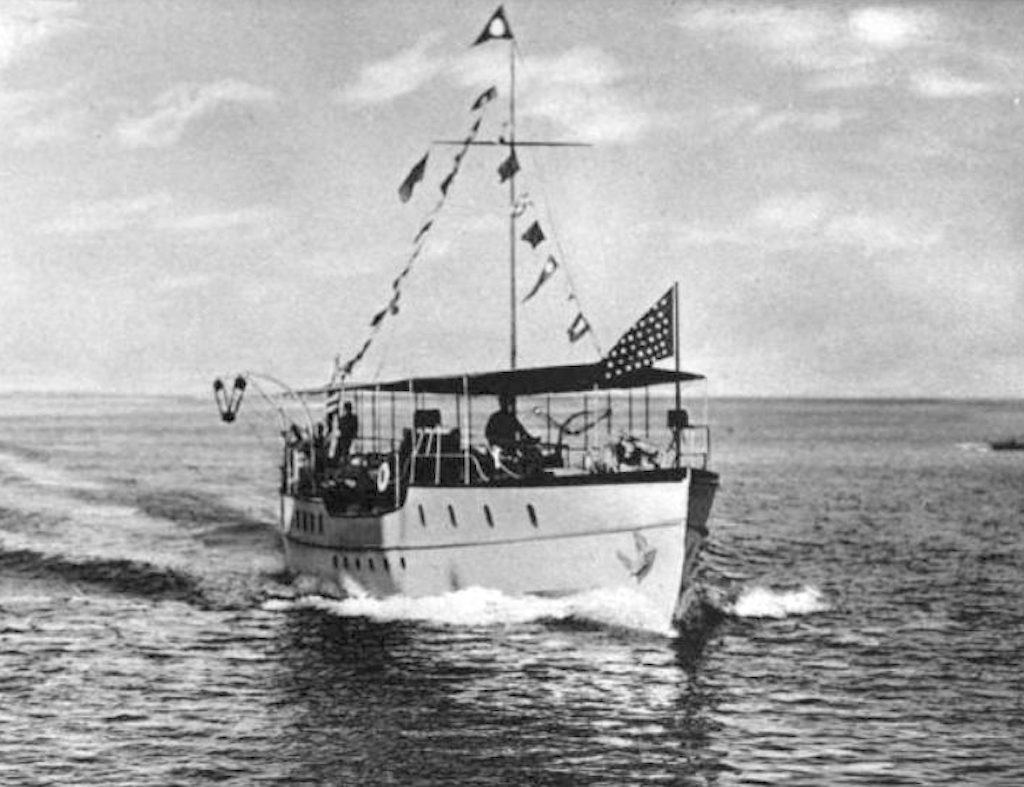
The Anton Dohrn at Tortugas, Florida, 4 July 1911

On the afternoon of 3 June 1911 Anton Dohrn made a trial run from the builder's yard to the end of the ship channel near Cape Florida then departed Miami before dawn for the Carnegie Institution's Department of Marine Biology Laboratory at Dry Tortugas, Florida. The primary operating area of the vessel was in the vicinity of the station; however, occasional operations further afield were undertaken with notes of Anton Dohrn visiting the Bahamas and other islands in the Caribbean. The laboratory's normal season was from June to August with the vessel being kept in Miami during the other months. Repairs to buildings after a 1910 hurricane damaged in particular prefabricated ones imported from the north, expanded laboratory capacity for researchers from 8 to 14. The new capabilities, including independent logistics support for the station, provided by Anton Dohrn led to plans to expand research into ocean currents and geologic and biological work to the Bahamas, Cuba, Haiti and Jamaica.

In its logistics role Anton Dohrn had to make a weekly trip from Tortugas to Key West with director Mayer noting those trips severely restricted availability for scientific use and, with conditions at Tortugas changing, led to his recommending in 1915 a relocation of the station. Mayer scouted Jamaica and in May 1915 piloted Anton Dohrn with six biologist aboard to Puerto Rico to investigate both scientifically and as a new site for the station. The war in Europe and his conviction the United States entry was a strong possibility led Mayer, an "ardent patriot," to increasingly dislike his German roots (leading eventually to a change in name to Mayor) to propose his command of Anton Dohrn as a naval patrol vessel in that event.

== Navy lease ==
On 31 July 1917, the U.S. Navy acquired Anton Dohrn under a lease agreement from the Carnegie Institution for use as a section patrol boat during World War I. She was commissioned at Key West, Florida, on 5 October 1917 as USS Anton Dohrn. The vessel, designated SP-1086, was assigned to the 7th Naval District based at St. Augustine, Florida serving on patrol duty along the northeastern coast of Florida through the end of World War I. The Navy returned Anton Dohrn to the Carnegie Institute on 2 January 1919 and she was stricken from the Navy List simultaneously.

== Return to ocean science ==
Anton Dohrn returned to her pre war routine of laboratory work at Dry Tortugas and continued in that role until the closure of the laboratory in 1939.

In June 1940 Anton Dohrn was given to Woods Hole Oceanographic Institution for local scientific work. The vessel was completely reconditioned and re-engined by Woods Hole at a cost $18,000. The vessel spent some 98 days at sea in 1940 and was described as "able and economical" by Columbus Iselin, supervisor of the design and construction of RV Atlantis and, in 1940, director of the institution. Biologist Gordon Riley on the other hand described the vessel "as funny a little ship as I have ever seen" and, though very strongly built, having "all the sea-keeping qualities of an old fashioned, round bottomed bathtub."

The laboratory, taken over and devoted entirely to classified Navy work, put Anton Dohrn into service of those projects "concerning which nothing at the present time may be written." The nature of that work, some of which involved Anton Dohrn, importantly involved how sound used in sonar was effected by temperature, thus allowing submarines to go undetected due to temperature gradients. The bathythermograph was developed by Carl-Gustav Rossby and turned into a production model for Navy use by Athelstan Spilhaus working with Maurice Ewing and Allyn C. Vine. The work with sound led to Ewing's discovery of the sound channel, a layer of minimum velocity, allowing detection of sound at very long ranges. The vessels of the institution were involved in underwater explosive experiments and sediment studies.

Between 1940 and the vessel's sale in April 1947 at least forty research cruises were made between the Gulf of Maine and the New Jersey coast. Anton Dohrn was sold for use as a mail boat between New Bedford and Cuttyhunk Island.

== See also ==
- Carnegie (yacht), another specialized Carnegie Institution vessel

== Bibliography ==
- Carnegie Institution of Washington (1911). The Carnegie Institution of Washington, Founded by Andrew Carnegie. Washington: The Carnegie Institution.
- Christman, Steve (21 April 2004). "Swietenia mahogani". Floridata Plant Encyclopedia. Floridata.com LLC.
- Cullen, Vicky (2005). Down to the Sea for Science: 75 Years of Ocean Research, Education, and Exploration at the Woods Hole Oceanographic Institution. Woods Hole, Mass.: Woods Hole Oceanographic Institution. ISBN 9781880224090. LCCN 2008530726.
- Inweld Corporation. "Inweld Naval Bronze" (PDF). Inweld Corporation.
- Iselin, Columbus. O.D. II (1942). "Reports on Physical Oceanography". Annual Report of the Director of the Museum of Comparative Zoology at Harvard College (1941–1942). Cambridge: Museum of Comparative Zoology.
- Lloyd's Register of Shipping (1917). Lloyd's Register of American Yachts. New York: Lloyd's Register of Shipping. p. 46.
- Mayer, Alfred G. (1911). "Department of Marine Biology". Carnegie Institution of Washington Year Book No. 10. 10. Washington: Carnegie Institution of Washington: 120–127.
- McCartney, Michael. "Columbus O'Donnell Iselin". Woods Hole Oceanographic Institution.
- "Carnegie Ship Begins Cruise to Lower Keys". The Miami News. 29 May 1926.
- Naval History and Heritage Command (18 June 2015). "Anton Dohrn". Dictionary of American Naval Fighting Ships. Naval History and Heritage Command.
- NavSource. "Anton Dohrn (SP 1086)". NavSource.
- Clapp, George H.; Johnson, C. W. (1912). "The Land Shells of Garden Key, Dry Tortugas, Fla". The Nautilus. 25 (December 1911): 92.
- "Notes". The Nautilus. 25 (August 1912): 48. 1912.
- South Atlantic Fishery Management Council. "4.4 Heritage of Past Research" (PDF). Briefing Books. Archived from the original (PDF) on 15 July 2015.
- Stephens, Lester D.; Calder, Dale R. (2006). Seafaring Scientist: Alfred Goldsborough Mayor, Pioneer in Marine Biology. Columbia, S.C.: University of South Carolina Press. ISBN 9781570036415. LCCN 2006010192.
- Stetson, Judith G. "Woods Hole in World War II" (PDF). Woods Hole Oceanographic Institution.
- "Anton Dohrn Off on Hunting Trip for Ocean Curios". The Weekly Miami Metropolis. 9 June 1911.
- Woods Hole Oceanographic Institution. "Anton Dohrn, 1940–1947". History of WHOI Ships. Woods Hole Oceanographic Institution.
- Young, Robert Thompson (1922). Biology in America. Boston: Richard G. Badger.
