= Carl August Dohrn =

German entomologist

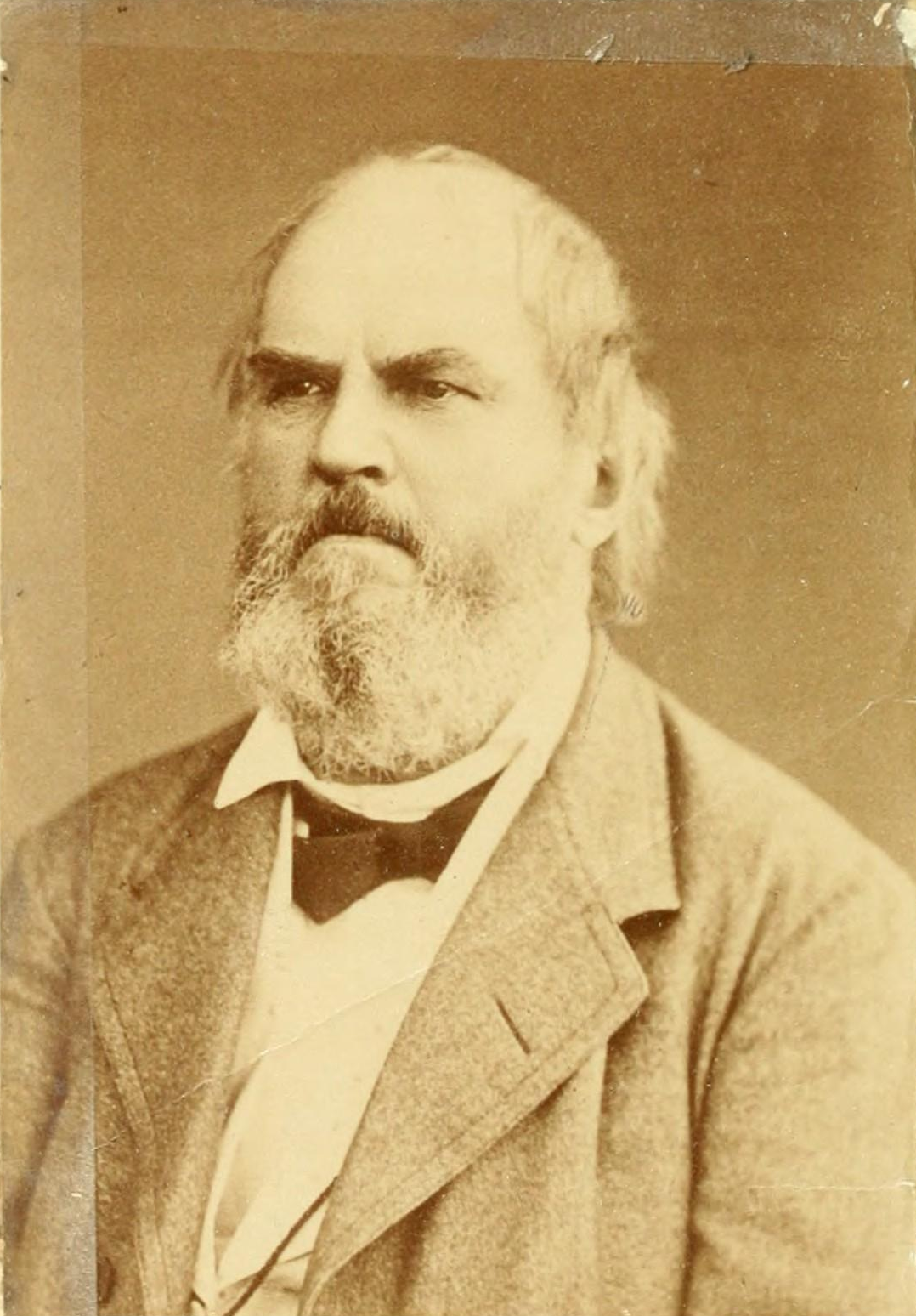
- Born: 27 June 1806; Stettin, Prussia (now Szczecin, Poland)
- Died: 10 May 1892 (aged 85)
- Known for: Naming numerous insect species
- Spouse: Adelheid Dietrich
- Children: Four, including Felix Anton Dohrn, Heinrich Wolfgang Ludwig Dohrn
- Parents: Heinrich Dohrn (father); Johanna Hüttern (mother)
- Scientific career
- Fields: Entomology

Carl August Dohrn (27 June 1806 – 10 May 1892) was a German entomologist who was a founding member of the Stettin Entomological Society. He collected insects, particularly beetles and described several species. He was also known for his literary works, translation of Spanish dramas, and as a man of letters and a promoter of music. He was the father of the marine biologist Anton Dohrn and the entomologist Heinrich Wolfgang Ludwig Dohrn.

== Biography ==
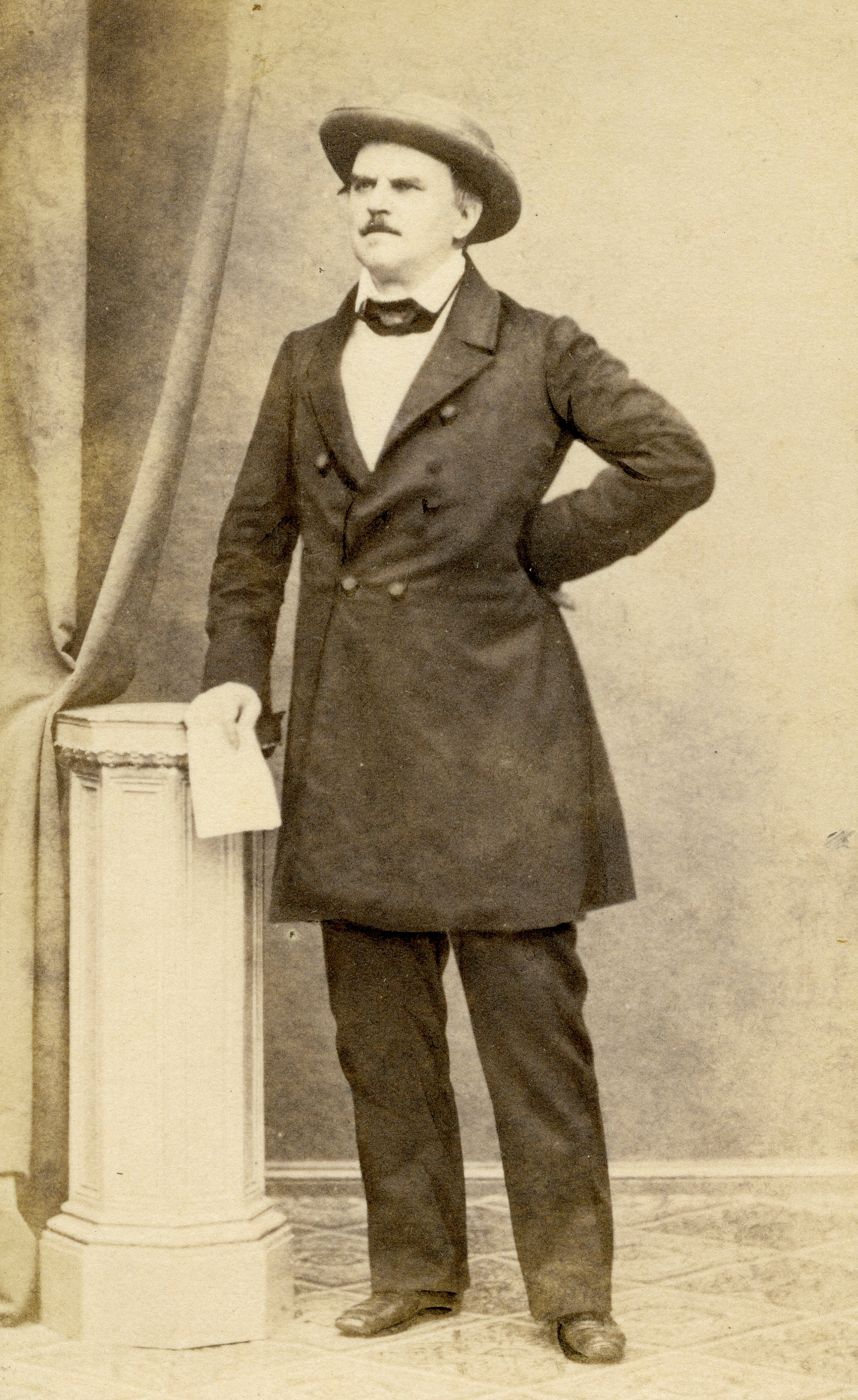
Carte de visite portrait

Born at Stettin (Szczecin, now Poland) Carl August was the son of Johanna Hüttern and Heinrich Dohrn, who was a wine and spice merchant, and had made the family fortune by refining and trading in sugar. This wealth allowed Carl August to devote himself to his various hobbies; travelling, folk music and entomology. He went to the University of Berlin in 1822 to study law but became more interested in literature and music. In 1831 he travelled for six years through Europe, North Africa and South America. He examined sugar production in Algeria and Brazil and returned to German in 1837. He translated dramas by Calderon from Spanish and a collection of Swedish folks songs and became noted as a man of letters. He studied English so as to study the works of Shakespeare. Frederick William IV of Prussia took an interest in his literary work and Dohrn's close friends included Felix Mendelssohn and Alexander von Humboldt. He managed the Pomeranian sugar refinery after the death of his father in 1852. From 1859 to 1861 he represented Stettin in the Prussian House of Representatives.

Although interested in all orders of insects Dohrn specialised in Coleoptera. His first published paper was in the Entomologische Zeitung for 1845 but he was an active entomologist long before this, since he had acted as Secretary to the Stettin Entomological Society from its foundation in 1839 and edited its journal. He was elected president of the society in 1843 retiring from the post in 1887. During this time he held together the rather fractious German entomologists and the society flourished. He edited Linnaea entomologica with 16 volumes issued from 1846 to 1866. Dohrn had many contacts including Alexander Henry Haliday, with whom he wrote a paper on the Linnaean Diptera (See Talk:Carl August Dohrn) and the London entomologists. He was a personal friend of Henry Tibbats Stainton with whom he stayed in England.

A frequent visitor to London he was accompanied by the Lepidopterist, Philipp Christoph Zeller in 1852, by Carl Henrik Boheman in 1854 and by Hermann August Hagen in 1857. He held musical evenings at his home, playing the piano and singing himself or examining the works of other composers. The composer Felix Mendselssohn Bartholdy was a regular attendee and friend. He spent many summers in Italy, in Lucca with Haliday and in Turin with Maximilian Spinola. Dohrn was elected a fellow of the Entomological Society of London in 1855 and an honorary member in 1855. A classicist he was fluent in many European languages including English. In 1862 he received an honorary doctorate from the University of Königsberg. His Coleoptera collection was very extensive and just prior to his death, at 86, he had received upwards of 1,000 beetles from Sumatra. He also had a large library. Both the books and his insect collections were donated to the Stettin Museum but much of it was destroyed in World War II because of which several species that he described such as Dromica bertinae are treated as nomen dubium (the types having been lost). The bird species Glaucis dohrnii originally under the genus Ramphodon was named after him.

=== Family ===
Dohrn married Adelheid née Dietrich (1803–1883) in 1837 which caused problems in his relationship with his father. It was only through mediation by Alexander von Humboldt that they were reconciled. They had a daughter and three sons. Their son Felix Anton Dohrn, named after godfather Felix Mendelssohn-Bartholdy, became an ardent supporter of Charles Darwin and famous marine zoologist. Another, older, son Heinrich Wolfgang Ludwig Dohrn was also an entomologist.
