= Entomological Society of Stettin =

The Entomological Society of Szczecin (German: Entomologischer Verein zu Stettin), more commonly known as the Entomological Society of Stettin or Stettin Entomological Society, based in Szczecin (formerly Stettin), was one of the leading entomological societies of the 19th century. Most German entomologists were members, as were many from England, Sweden, Italy, France, and Spain. The society had very large collections and a very comprehensive library.

This first German entomological society was formed in 1839. Following the death at age 39 of its first and short-lived president, Dr. Wilhelm Ludwig Ewald Schmidt, Carl August Dohrn (1806-1892), a lifelong resident of the then Prussian town of Stettin, became its second president. He was elected at an anniversary meeting on 5 November 1843. Having acted as secretary of the society for the previous four years, he continued in this role, and that of president, for the next forty.

Under Dohrn's presidency the society became as important as the entomological societies of London and Paris. As in these countries, the society reflected the growing professionalism during the second half of the 19th century, necessitating specialisation. Specialisation was accompanied by a rise in technical standards of argument and presentation and a tendency toward the use of learned jargon. There were differences, however, as German universities and academies became increasingly advanced relative to those of England and France, organising seminars (with their published proceedings) and encouraging early publication of, for instance, the Ph.D. dissertation, the academic "program" and the technical monograph. Also, after about 1850, any entomologist who wished to keep abreast of developments in his subject had to be able to read at least English, French, German, Italian, and, in some cases, Swedish. Latin and Greek were indispensable. Far fewer entomologists in England and France were multilingual than in Germany. The Irish entomologist Alexander Henry Haliday, an early member of the society, was a notable exception.

Szczecin (Stettin) is close to Lund in Sweden, home of the great Swedish dipterist Johann Wilhelm Zetterstedt, and also to Mesritz, where Hermann Loew, the greatest dipterist of the century, was to become Director of the Royal "Realschule". Both were members of the society.

The society's journal was called the Stettiner Entomologische Zeitung, abbreviated Stett. Ent. Zeit.

== Quotes ==
"The Stettin Entomological Society has continued in full activity, and the number of entomologists, in other countries as well as Germany (six of them members of this Society), who have been admitted as ordinary members during the past year, shows that their proceeding have aroused a greater zeal for scientific enquiry and mutual communication. Some of the visits to England of their Secretary, Dr. Schaum, have appeared in their volume of proceedings; as the articles on the determination of questionable Linnean species of Coleoptera, for which the collection of Linnaeus, in the possession of the Linnean Society of London, has afforded the materials. Besides the various interesting communications contained in this volume, (among which may be particularized Suffrian's criticisms on Schönherr's generic arrangement of the Curculionidae, and an elaborate investigation, by the veteran Gravenhorst, of the affinities of the Brachyeltrous genus Quedius, the society have published a second volume of their yearly journal (the Linnaea) containing, beside the usual portion of matter concerning Coleoptera, Lepidoptera and Diptera, from the pens of Suffrian, Zeller and Loew, a considerable contribution to the knowledge of the almost microscopical and obscure Hymenopterous family Mymaridae by Prof. Förster; as a supplement to which may be mentioned Loew's discovery of the hitherto unknown economy and prior states of these insects, communicated in the ' Entomologisches Zeitung'."

"The flourishing state of the society during all this time is the best evidence of the power of Dohrn to attract and keep together the bulk of the entomologists of Germany and many of other countries, and his influence remained great. Coleoptera occupied his own attention but he had a regard for insects of other orders if only for the reason that it brought him into communication with the lovers of them, for he had a sympathy not only with the entomologists as such but also as cultivators of a sense of pleasure and enjoyment in the varied realm of nature, and he was able, as a rule, to give far more information on cognate matters than he received"

== Sources ==
- Douglas, J. W., 1892. Entomologist's Monthly Magazine (3) 3:164–165: Obituary of C. A. Dohrn.
- Lefèvre, E., 1892. Bull. Soc. Ent. Fr. 61: Obituary of C. A. Dohrn.

Various other obituaries of C.A. Dohrn are listed by Reinhard Gaedike and Eckhard K. Groll in Biographien der Entomologen der Welt

== See also ==
- German Entomological Institute
