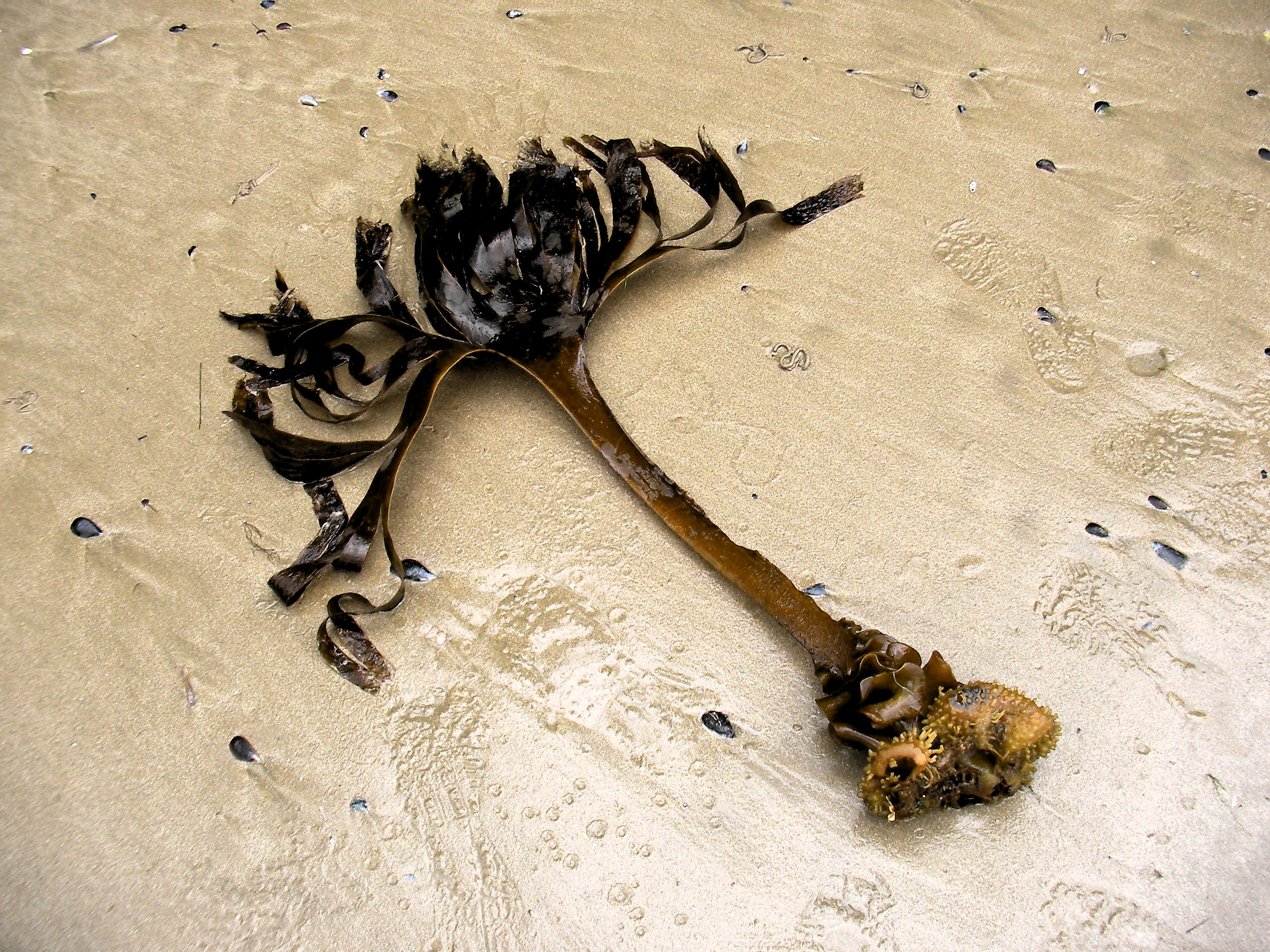

Scientific classification
- Domain: Eukaryota
- Clade: Sar
- Clade: Stramenopiles
- Division: Ochrophyta
- Class: Phaeophyceae
- Order: Tilopteridales
- Family: Phyllariaceae
- Genus: Saccorhiza
- Species: S. polyschides

Binomial name
- Saccorhiza polyschides (Lightf.) Batt.

Synonyms
- Alaria pylaiei var. grandifolia (J.Agardh) Jónsson, 1904; Fucus bulbosus Hudson, 1778; Fucus polyschides Lightfoot, 1777; Gigantea bulbosa Stackhouse, 1816; Haligenia bulbosa Decaisne, 1842; Laminaria blossevillei Bory de Saint-Vincent, 1838; Laminaria bulbosa J.V.Lamouroux, 1813; Saccorhiza bulbosa J.Agardh, 1848

= Saccorhiza polyschides =

Species of alga

Saccorhiza polyschides, common name furbelows, is a large brown algae of the lower shore and is the largest seaweed found in Europe.

== Description ==
Saccorhiza polyschides is a large and bulky seaweed growing to 2 – 4 metres long. The holdfast is a large, bulbous hollow, knobbly structure. The stipe is long, tough, leathery and rigid and is several centimetres wide. Near the base the margin forms several broad, wavy frills. These ruffles tend to dissipate wave energy and lessen the likelihood that it will be torn from the rock. The frond is digitate with about eight large flat lobes and may be massive. The lack of a midrib distinguishes it from Alaria esculenta. It is an extremely fast growing species, growing annually from the base and becoming fully extended over the course of a few months.

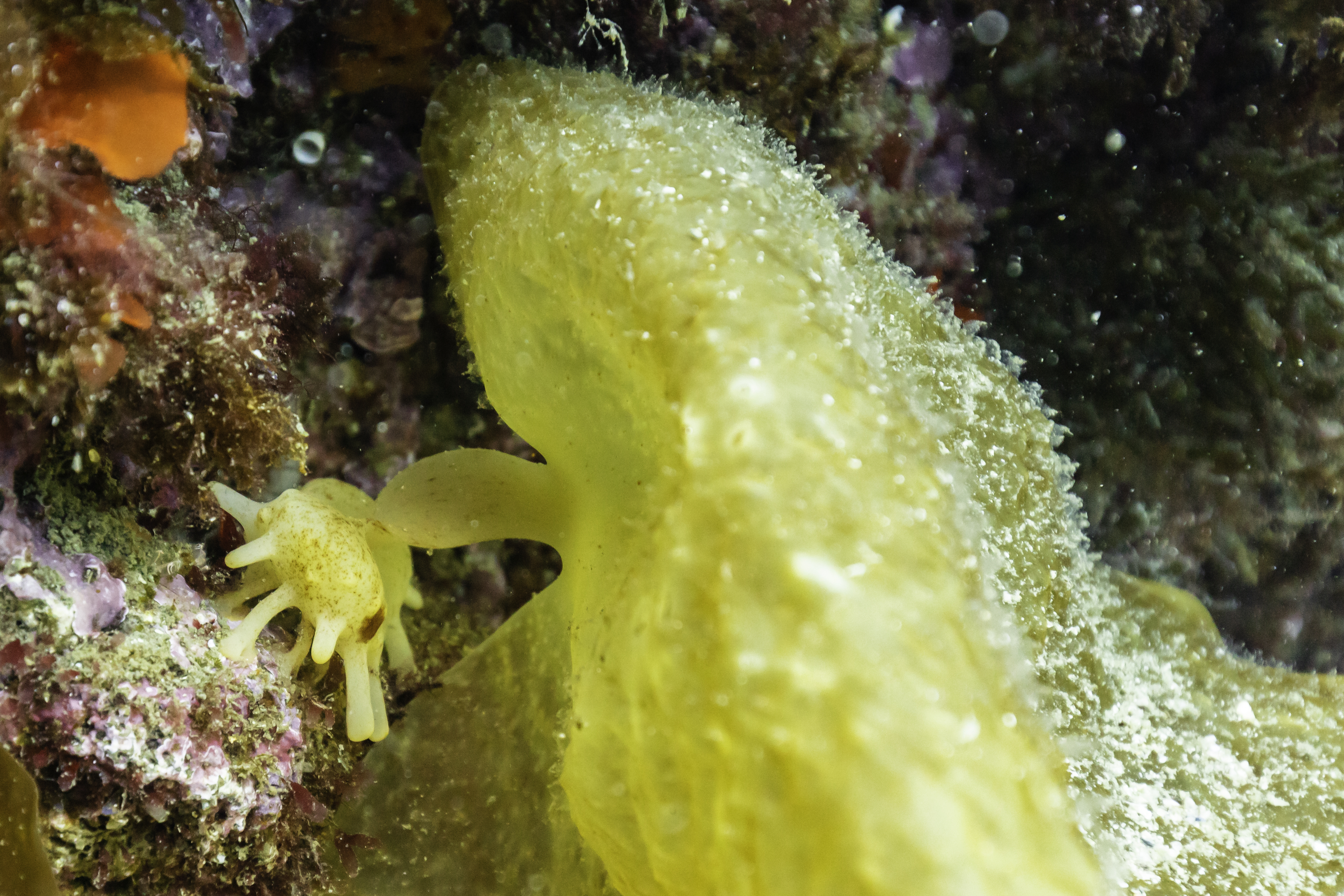
View of the base

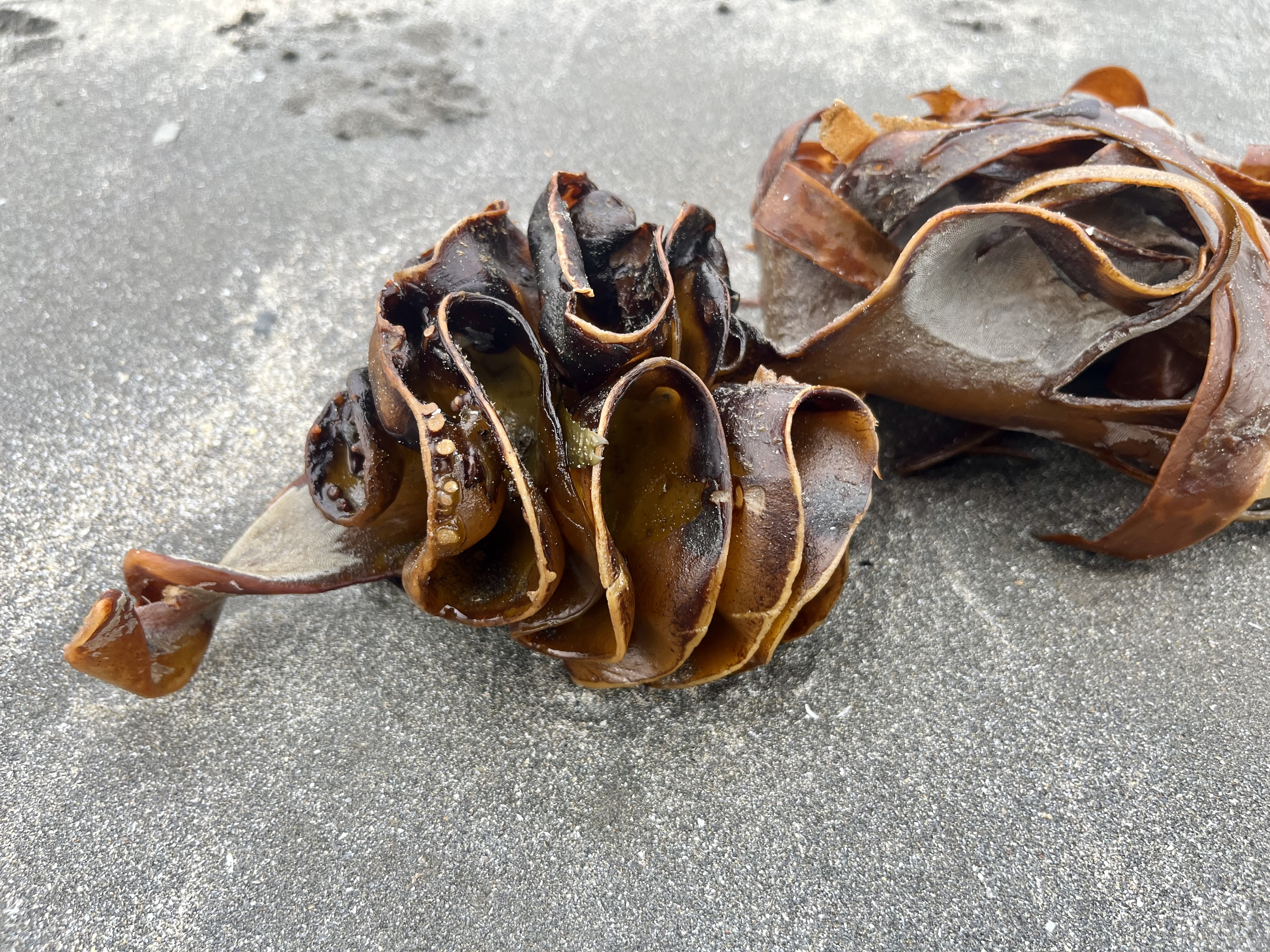
Margin

== Habitat ==
Saccorhiza polyschides is found on the lowest part of the shore. It cannot tolerate desiccation and may be found in places where it is wetted by spray when uncovered by the retreating tide. It is often found in association with Laminaria hyperborea.

== Distribution ==
Distribution including Europe: Ireland, Britain, Faroes, France, Greece, Helgoland, Isla de Alboran, Italy, Netherlands, Norway, Portugal, Scandinavia and Spain.
