= Anton Dohrn =

German biologist, zoologist and Darwinist (1840–1909)

Anton Dohrn FRS FRSE
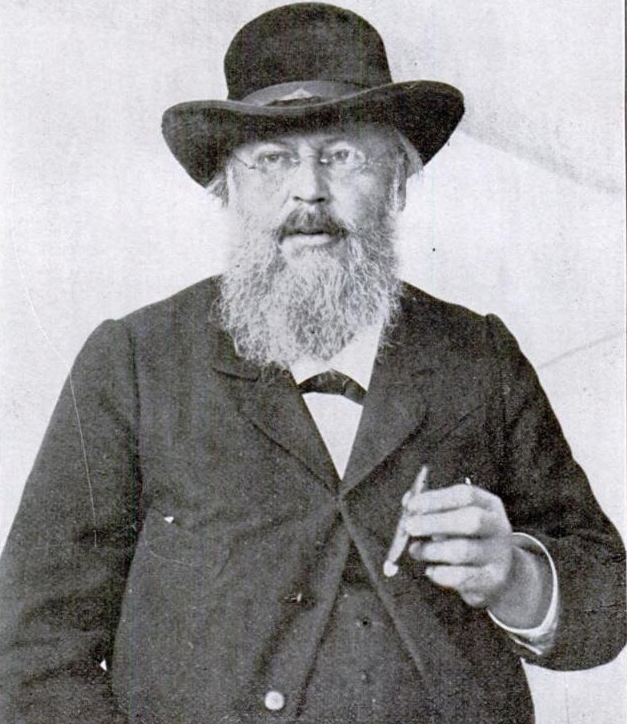
- Born: Felix Anton Dohrn; 29 December 1840; Stettin, Pomerania, Prussia
- Died: 26 September 1909 (aged 68); Munich, Germany
- Education: University of Breslau
- Known for: Principle of succession of functions, Der Ursprung der Wirbelthiere und das Princip des Functionswechsels: Genealogische Skizzen
- Spouse: Maria Baranowska
- Children: 4
- Father: Carl August Dohrn
- Relatives: Heinrich Wolfgang Ludwig Dohrn, brother
- Scientific career
- Fields: Biology
- Institutions: University of Jena, Stazione Zoologica, Naples
- Thesis: On the Anatomy of Hemiptera
- Doctoral advisor: Eduard Grube

Felix Anton Dohrn FRS FRSE (29 December 1840 – 26 September 1909) was a prominent German Darwinist and the founder and first director of the first marine-biological and zoological research station in the world, the Stazione Zoologica in Naples, Italy. The institution became a centre for the exchange of biological ideas through the network of visitors from around the world. He worked on embryology and examined vertebrate origins in terms of functional phylogeny and proposed a principle of succession of functions in 1875 on how one organ could become the basis for the evolution of another of an entirely different function. The institution transitioned from a private one to a public Italian organization through the subsequent management by his son Reinhard Dohrn. He was an elected International Member of the American Philosophical Society. and in 1892 he was awarded honorary membership of the Manchester Literary and Philosophical Society.

== Family history ==
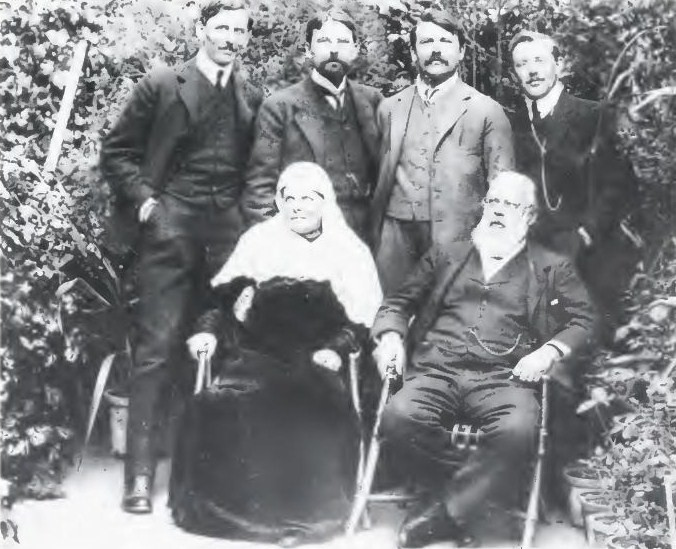
The Dohrn family. Anton, Maria and their four sons Boguslaw, Wolfgang, Harald and Reinhard.

Dohrn was born in Stettin (Szczecin), in the Province of Pomerania of the Kingdom of Prussia, into a wealthy middle-class family. His grandfather, Heinrich Dohrn, had been a wine and spice merchant, and had made the family fortune by trading in sugar and a director of the sugar refinery Pommersche Provinzial Zuckersiederei. This wealth and advice from Alexander von Humboldt, allowed Anton's father, Carl August (1806–1892), to devote himself to his various hobbies; travelling, folk music and insects. Anton, the youngest son, read zoology and medicine at various German universities (Königsberg, Bonn, Jena and Berlin). The attitudes of his father, a liberal one with interest in people, literature, music (Felix Mendelssohn was his godfather) and science was to have a key role in Dohrn's own work as a promoter of scientific collaboration. His brother Heinrich Wolfgang Ludwig Dohrn was also a zoologist.

== Entomology and marine life ==
Dohrn received an early education which was based on humanist ideals. He went to study medicine and zoology and Koenigsberg, Bonn, Jena and Berlin. was initially interested in Hemiptera. In 1859, he published Beitrag zur Kenntniss der Harpactoridae in Entomologische Zeitung and the more important Catalogus hemipterorum. He gained his doctorate from Breslau in November 1865 with his thesis "On the Anatomy of Hemiptera". He visited Heligoland along with Ernst Haeckel to examine marine organisms for the first time. Haeckel talked about a zoological station at this time. In 1867 Dohrn visited Millport, Isle of Cumbrae as a guest of David Robertson (1806–1896) who had founded the Millport Biological Station. During this period he became associated with the English scientific establishment through his father's friendship with Henry Tibbats Stainton. He also met Thomas Henry Huxley (1825–1895). In 1866, he published a paper on fossil insects Zur Kenntniss der Insecten in den Primärformationen. In this he describes Eugereon boeckingi (Palaeodictyoptera). He became a privatdozent at Jena in 1868.

== Introduction to Darwinism ==
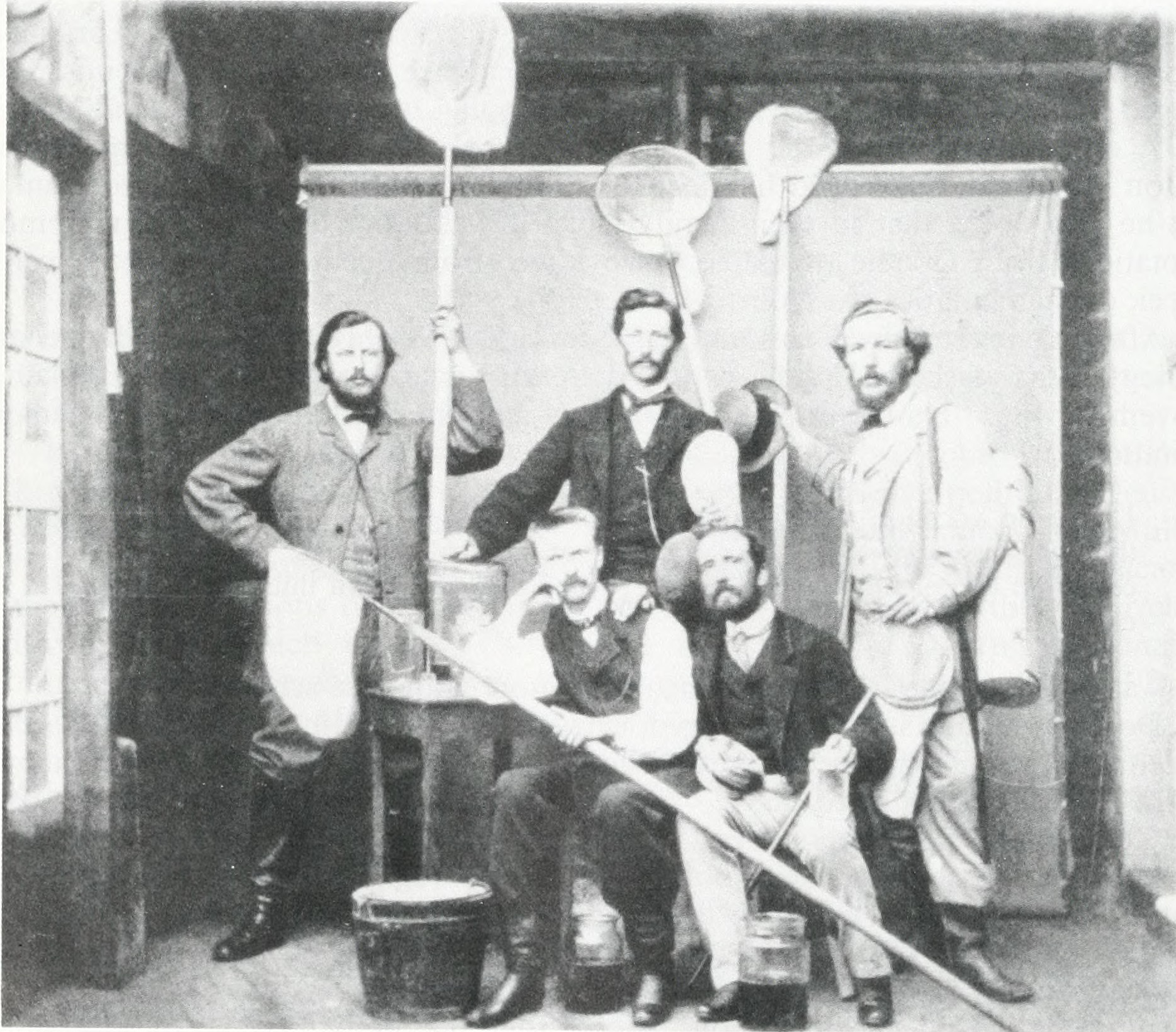
Anton Dohrn and other naturalists in Heligoland (1865). Standing left to right Richard Greef, Bonn; Ernst Haeckel, Jena. Sitting, left to right: Salverda, Delft; Pietro Marchi, Florence

Dohrn's ideas of zoology changed in the summer 1862 when he returned to study at Jena, where Ernst Haeckel introduced him to Darwin's work and theories. Dohrn became a fervent defender of Darwin's theory of evolution by natural selection. He saw comparative anatomy, physiology and embryology as means to determine the evolutionary history of various organisms.

At that time comparative embryology was the keystone of morphological evolutionary studies, based on Haeckel's recapitulation theory, the idea that an organism during its embryonic development passes through the major stages of the evolutionary past of its species. Morphology became one of the major ways in which zoologists sought to expand and develop Darwinian theory in the latter years of the 19th century. Dohrn chose to become a "Darwinian morphologist".

Dohrn received his doctorate in 1865 at Breslau under Eduard Grube, and his Habilitation in 1868 at Jena with Rudolf Virchow, Ernst Haeckel and Carl Gegenbaur. The study subjects were medicine and zoology, and his Jena monograph was Studien zur Embryologie der Arthropoden. From 1868 to 1870, he was a Docent in zoology at Jena. During these times, he worked several times at facilities located by the sea: Heligoland alongside Haeckel in 1865, Hamburg in 1866, Millport, Scotland with David Robertson in 1867 and 1868 and moved to Messina, Italy, during the winter of 1868 together with his friend and colleague Nicholas Miklouho-Maclay to work on the marine life of the Straits of Messina. In 1870 Dohrn was called up to (briefly) serve in the Franco-Prussian War.

Dohrn's view of Haeckel's philosophical generalizations changed after he read Immanuel Kant and F. A. Lange's Geschichte des Materialismus (1866).

== Principle of succession of functions ==
Among Dohrn's most highly cited theoretical contributions was his so-called "principle of succession of functions". It was derived from pre-existing ideas, especially those that had been proposed by the comparative anatomist St. George Mivart. Dohrn's ideas on functional phylogenetics underlie some of the embryological hypotheses such as the origin of the vertebrate jaw from gill arches. In his original writings he claimed that gill slits had changed into a variety of vertebrate organs.

== Development of "zoological stations" ==
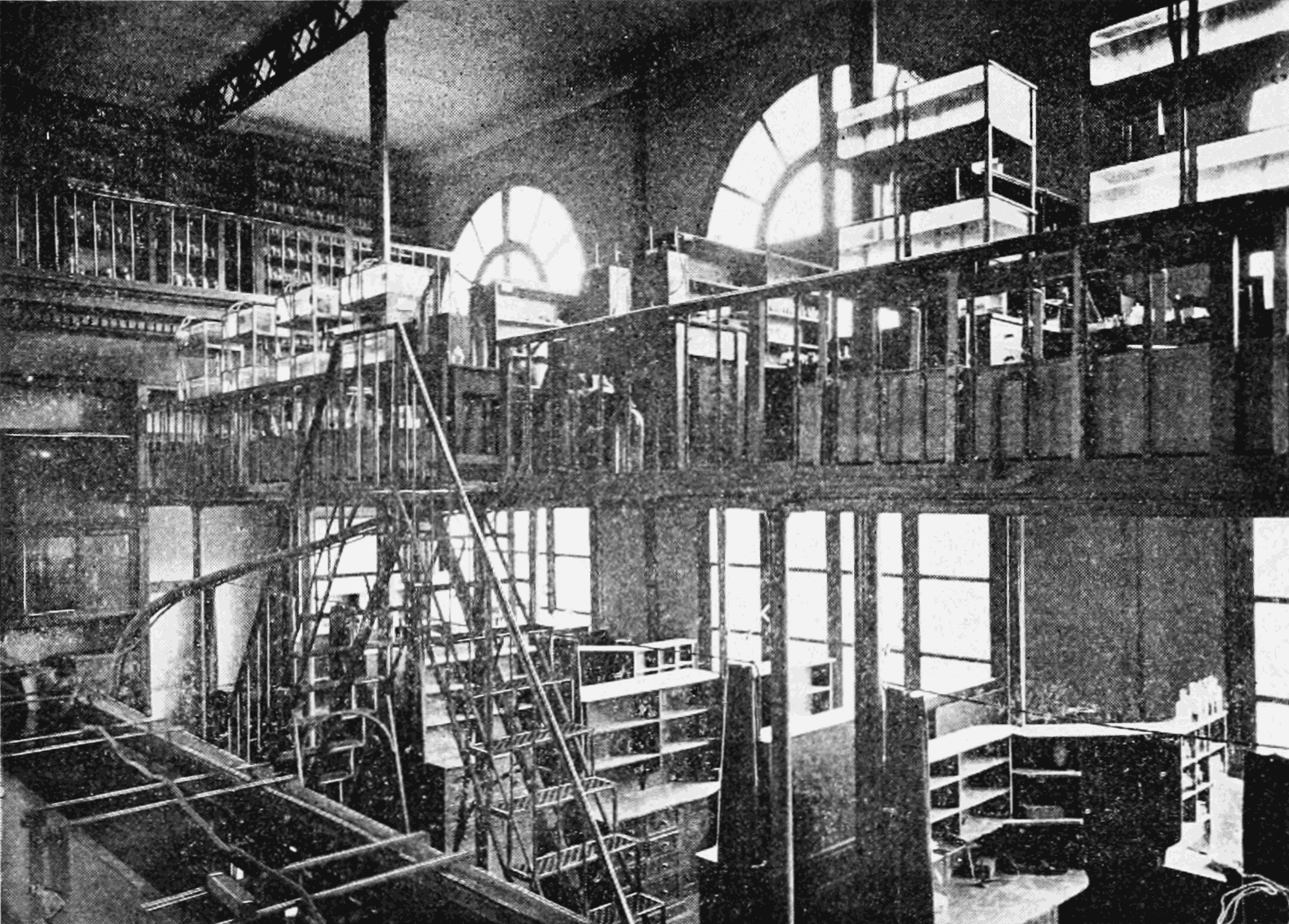
Work stations in the Naples laboratory in 1901

From 1850 to 1852, the zoologist and geologist Carl Vogt had lived in Nice where he tried unsuccessfully to enlist support for a marine zoological station (one was later established as Observatoire Oceanologique de Villefranche). The use of marine organisms as models for study had been promoted in Germany by Johannes Peter Müller (1801–1858). The Straits of Messina were known for their richness and had been studied by Spallanzani and August D. Krohn in the past. In Messina, Dohrn and Miklouho-Maclay conceived a plan to cover the globe with a network of zoological research stations, analogous to railway stations, where scientists could stop, collect material, make observations and conduct experiments, before moving on to the next station. In 1859–60 Haeckel and his students described 144 new species of Radiolaria collected in the waters. For a while Messina came to be called the "Mecca of the German Privat-Dozent". It was Miklouho-Maclay who introduced Dohrn to the Russian-Polish de Baranowski family. In 1874 Dohrn married their eldest daughter, sixteen-year-old Maria Baranowska. They had four sons, namely, Boguslaw, Wolfgang, Harald and Reinhard. Due to her linguistic abilities, Maria became a successful translator.

Dohrn realised how useful it would be for scientists to arrive at a location and find a ready to use laboratory. Dohrn rented two rooms for the "Stazione Zoologica di Messina", but quickly realized the technical difficulties of studying marine life without a permanent structure and support facilities, such as trained personnel and a library.

== Foundation of the Stazione Zoologica ==
In 1870 Dohrn decided that Naples would be a better place for his Station. This choice was due to the greater biological richness of the Gulf of Naples and also to the possibility of starting a research institute of international importance in a large university town that itself had a strong international element.

After a visiting a newly opened aquarium in Berlin, the Berliner Aquarium Unter den Linden he decided that charging the general public to visit an aquarium might earn the laboratory enough money to pay a salary for a permanent assistant. Naples, with a population of 500,000 inhabitants, was one of the largest and most attractive cities of Europe and also had a considerable flow of tourists (30,000 a year) that could potentially visit the aquarium.

Dohrn overcame the doubts of the city authorities and persuaded them to give him, free-of-charge, a plot of land at the sea edge, in the beautiful Villa Comunale on the condition that he promised to build the Stazione Zoologica at his own expense.

He opened the station to visiting scientists in September 1873, and to the general public in January 1874.

In 1875 Dohrn published Der Ursprung der Wirbelthiere und das Princip des Functionswechsels: Genealogische Skizzen which proposed the "change of function" theory of the origin of vertebrates. He suggested that an organ could have secondary functions in addition to their primary function and that the subsidiary functions could become primary over evolutionary time.

== The "Bench" system ==
In order to promote the international status of the Stazione and to guarantee its economic and hence political independence and freedom of research, Dohrn introduced a series of innovative measures to finance his project. Firstly, the rental of work and research space (the "Bench system"), for an annual fee universities, governments, scientific institutions, private foundations or individuals could send one scientist to the Stazione for one year where he or she would find available all that was required to conduct research (laboratory space, animal supply, chemicals, an exceptional library and expert staff). He contributed his own library and obtained donations of books from publishers and authors, including Darwin. These facilities were supplied with no strings attached, in the sense that investigators were completely free to pursue their own projects and ideas.

This system worked so that when Anton Dohrn died in 1909 more than 2,200 scientists from Europe and the United States had worked at Naples and more than 50 tables-per-year had been rented out. It might be said that international scientific collaboration in the modern sense was born at the Stazione, based on quick and free communication of ideas, methods and results.

== Death and legacy ==
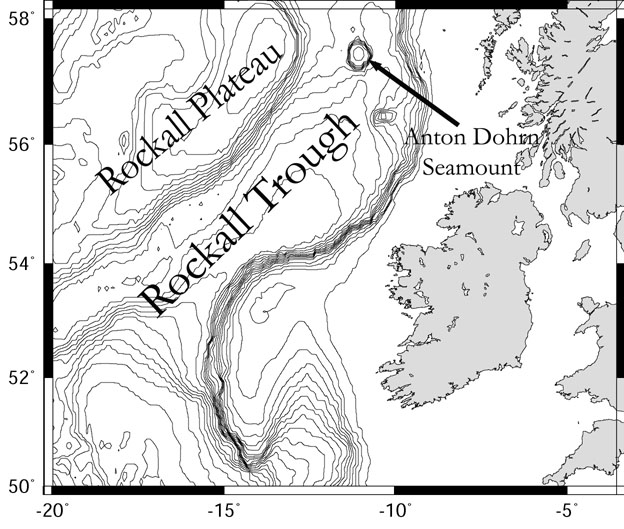
Map showing location of the Anton Dohrn Seamount

Dohrn suffered from heart problems in his last years and died in Munich on September 26, 1909. He was buried on October 3 at Jena. The success of the Stazione Zoologica, and the new way of thinking and funding research are the main legacies of Dohrn. The model was copied a number of times throughout the world. In 1878 Johns Hopkins University founded the Chesapeake Zoological Laboratory, under the direction of W.K. Brooks. Then, in 1888, the Marine Biological Laboratory was founded at Woods Hole and in 1892 the first laboratory on the United States West Coast, the Hopkins Marine Station, opened in California. In Britain, current marine laboratories that originate from this time include the Dunstaffnage Marine Station (today Scottish Association for Marine Science, 1884), the Gatty Marine Laboratory (University of St Andrews, 1884), the Marine Biological Association of the United Kingdom (Plymouth, 1888), the Dove Marine Laboratory (Newcastle University, 1897), the Fisheries Research Services Marine Laboratory (Aberdeen, 1899), and the Bangor Marine Station (Queen's University of Belfast, 1903).

Dohrn's name has been immortalised in an undersea feature, the Anton Dohrn Seamount, a seamount in the Rockall Trough, to the north-west of the British Isles, which has become known for the great biodiversity which lives on the cold-water coral, Lophelia pertusa, in this region.

The Carnegie Institution's Department of Marine Biology laboratory at Dry Tortugas, Florida placed the motor vessel Anton Dohrn in service in July 1911 for ocean science work. The vessel served in the United States Navy as the patrol vessel Anton Dohrn (SP-1086) from 1917 to 1919.

== Other sources ==
- Theodor Heuss (in German: 1940) Anton Dohrn in Neapel. Atlantis-Verlag, Berlin; Rainer Wunderlich, Tübingen 1948 and 1962 (Title now: "Anton Dohrn"); in English 1991, transl. by Liselotte Dieckmann, ed. Christiane Gröben Anton Dohrn. A Life for Science Springer, NY ISBN 0-387-53561-6 Springer, Berlin ISBN 3-540-53561-6
- Karl Ernst von Baer & Anton Dohrn Correspondence 1993. Ed. Christiane Gröben. Amer Philosophical Society ISBN 0-87169-833-1
- Theodor Boveri 2009: Anton Dohrn (1910) Kessinger ISBN 1-104-61706-4
- Daum, Andreas W. Wissenschaftspopularisierung im 19. Jahrhundert: Bürgerliche Kultur, naturwissenschaftliche Bildung und die deutsche Öffentlichkeit, 1848–1914. Munich: Oldenbourg, 1998, ISBN 3-486-56337-8.
- Musgrave, A. 1932 Bibliography of Australian Entomology 1775 – 1930. Sydney
- Semenov-Tjan-Schanskij, A. P. 1909 [Dohrn, F. A.] Revue Russe d'Entomologie 9
- Groeben, Christiane (1985). "Anton Dohrn: The Statesman of Darwinism: To Commemorate the 75th Anniversary of the Death of Anton Dohrn". Biological Bulletin. 168 (Supplement: The Naples Zoological Station and the Marine Biological Laboratory: One Hundred Years of Biology): 4–25. doi:10.2307/1541316. JSTOR 1541316.
- Carnegie Institution of Washington (1911). The Carnegie Institution of Washington, Founded by Andrew Carnegie. Washington: The Carnegie Institution.
- Naval History And Heritage Command. "Anton Dohrn". Dictionary of American Naval Fighting Ships. Naval History And Heritage Command.
