= Neotachina =

Scientific classification
- Kingdom: Animalia
- Phylum: Arthropoda
- Class: Insecta
- Order: Diptera
- Family: Tachinidae
- Subfamily: Tachininae
- Tribe: Proscissionini
- Genus: Neotachina; Malloch, 1938

Genus of flies

Neotachina is a genus of tachinid flies in the family Tachinidae. The four known species in this genus were collected in New Zealand in 1938 and described by Scottish entomologist John Russell Malloch.

== Diagnosis ==
This genus keys out together with Chaetopletha, Phaoniella, Platytachina, Plethochaetigera, and Tachineo. It is considerably difficult to find satisfactory external characters to distinguish these genera in a dichotomous key. This difficulty is expressed by Malloch 1938 several times over as well as by Dugdale 1969. A thorough revision at the genus level is needed that includes molecular analysis, rearing and collecting of new material.

== Species ==
- Neotachina angusticornis Malloch, 1938
- Neotachina depressa Malloch, 1938
- Neotachina laticornis Malloch, 1938
- Neotachina obtusa Malloch, 1938
