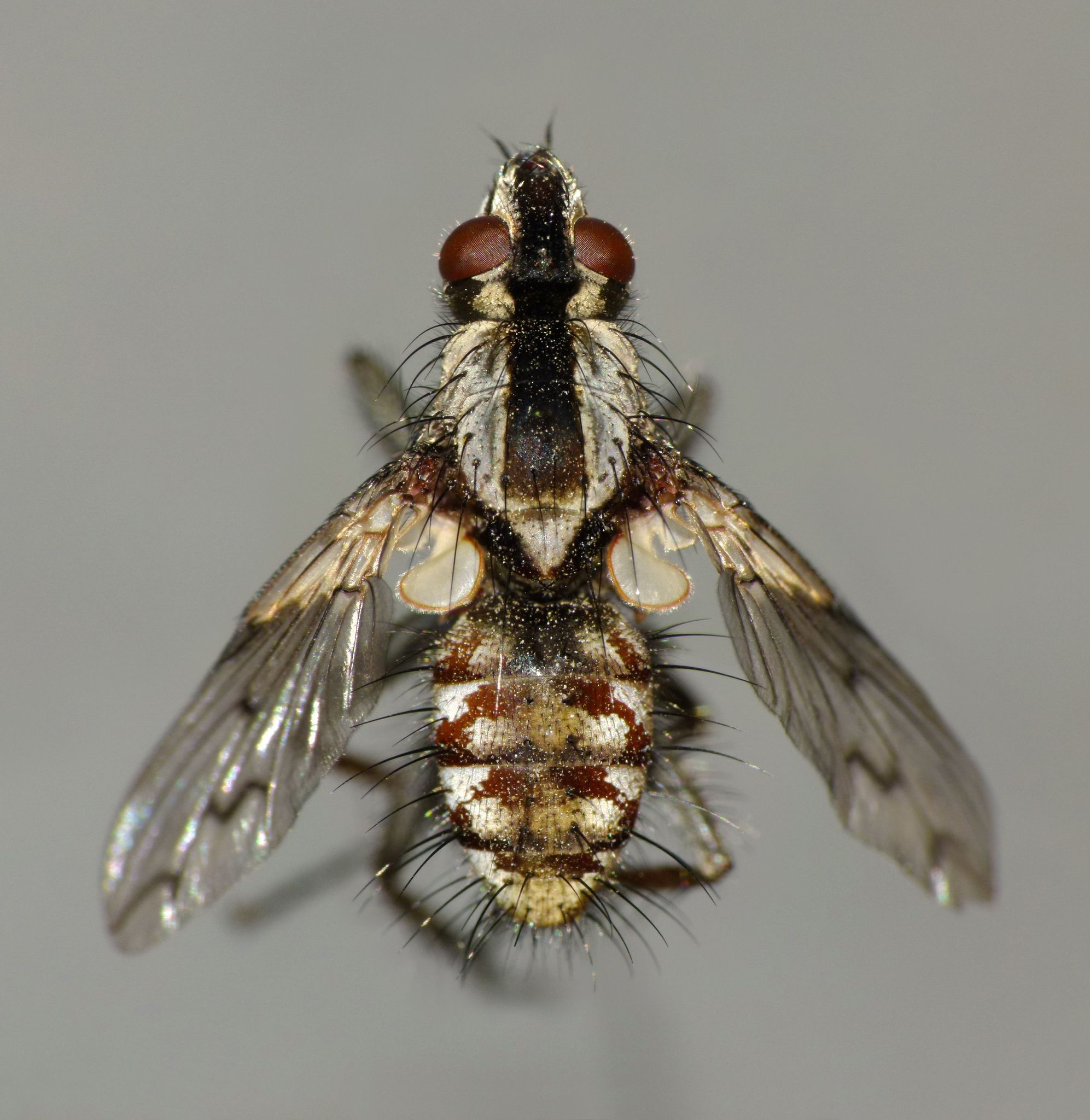
- Proscissio milleri

Scientific classification
- Kingdom: Animalia
- Phylum: Arthropoda
- Class: Insecta
- Order: Diptera
- Family: Tachinidae
- Subfamily: Tachininae
- Tribe: Proscissionini
- Genus: Proscissio; Hutton, 1901

Type species
- Proscissio montana Hutton, 1901

Synonyms
- Procissio Cantrell & Crosskey, 1989

= Proscissio =

Genus of flies

Proscissio is a genus of flies in the family Tachinidae.

== Species ==
- Proscissio albiceps Malloch, 1938
- Proscissio cana Hutton, 1901
- Proscissio lateralis Malloch, 1938
- Proscissio milleri Malloch, 1938
- Proscissio montana Hutton, 1901

== Distribution ==
New Zealand.
