= Exsul =

Scientific classification
- Domain: Eukaryota
- Kingdom: Animalia
- Phylum: Arthropoda
- Class: Insecta
- Order: Diptera
- Family: Muscidae
- Genus: Exsul; Hutton, 1900

Genus of flies

Exsul is a genus of flies belonging to the family Muscidae.

The genus was erected in 1901 by Frederick Hutton for the New Zealand endemic Exsul singularis (the bat-winged fly).

The species of this genus are found only in New Zealand.

Species:

- Exsul alfredoi Barbosa & Couri, 2013
- Exsul singularis Hutton, 1901
- Exsul tenuis Malloch, 1923
