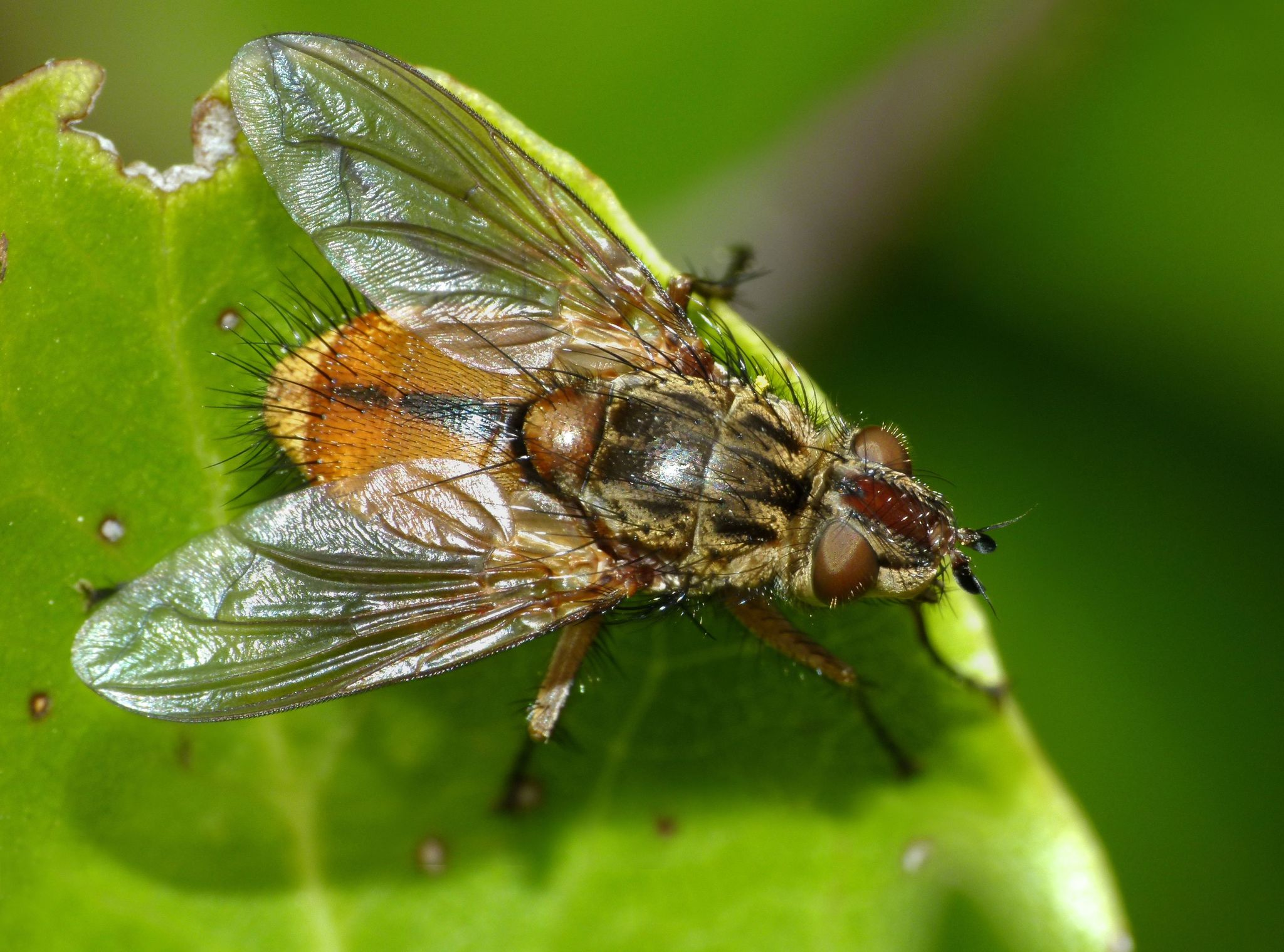
- Peremptor kumaraensis

Scientific classification
- Kingdom: Animalia
- Phylum: Arthropoda
- Class: Insecta
- Order: Diptera
- Family: Tachinidae
- Subfamily: Tachininae
- Tribe: Proscissionini
- Genus: Peremptor; Hutton, 1901

Type species
- Peremptor egmonti Hutton, 1901

= Peremptor =

Genus of flies

Peremptor is a genus of flies in the family Tachinidae.

== Species ==
- Peremptor egmonti Hutton, 1901
- Peremptor kumaraensis (Miller, 1913)
- Peremptor modicus (Hutton, 1901)

== Distribution ==
New Zealand.
