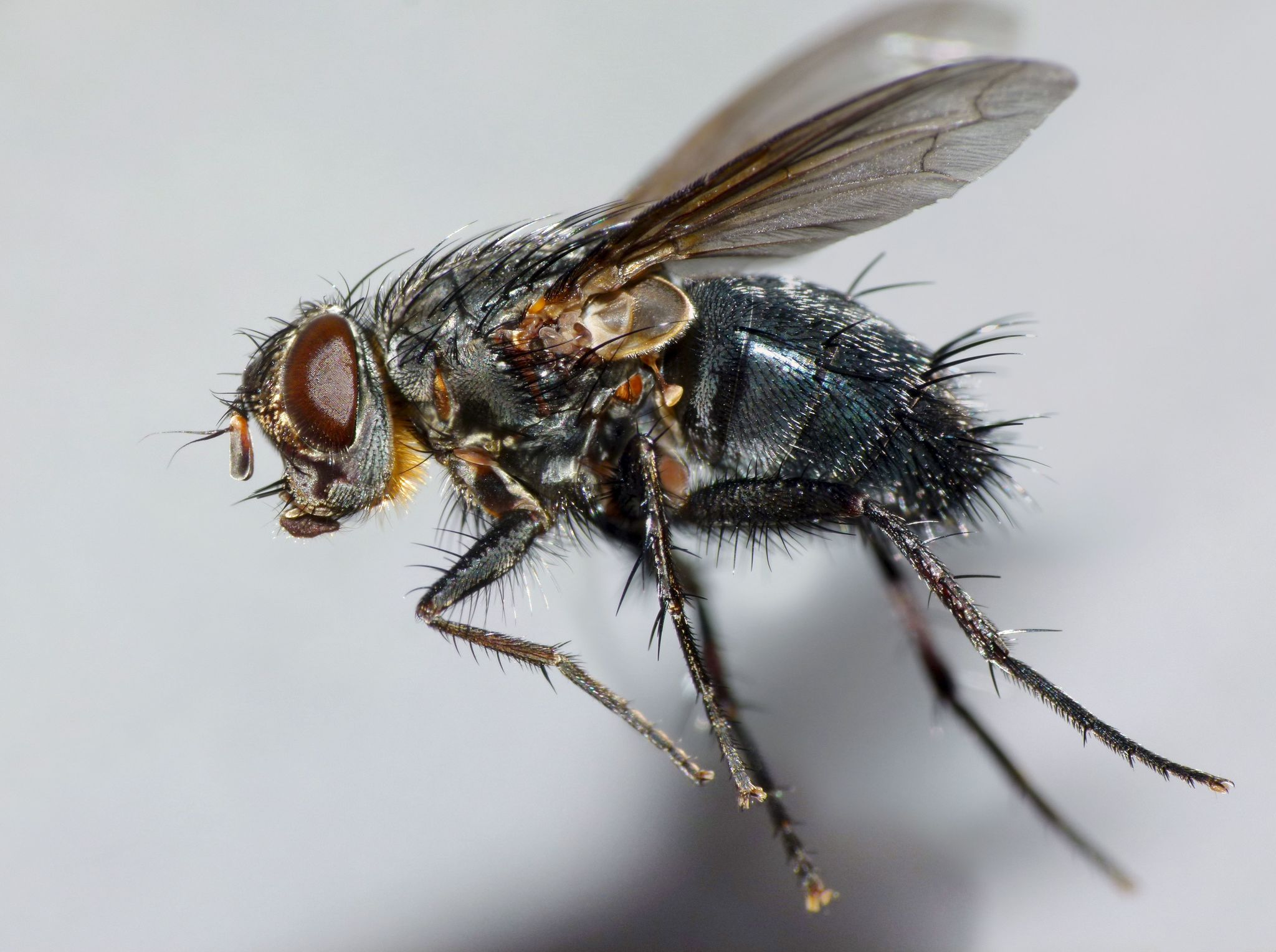
- Occisor sp.

Scientific classification
- Kingdom: Animalia
- Phylum: Arthropoda
- Class: Insecta
- Order: Diptera
- Family: Tachinidae
- Subfamily: Tachininae
- Tribe: Proscissionini
- Genus: Occisor; Hutton, 1901

Type species
- Occisor inscitus Hutton, 1901

= Occisor =

Genus of flies

Occisor is a genus of flies in the family Tachinidae.

== Species ==
- Occisor atratus Malloch, 1938
- Occisor inscitus Hutton, 1901
- Occisor versutus Hutton, 1901

== Distribution ==
New Zealand.
