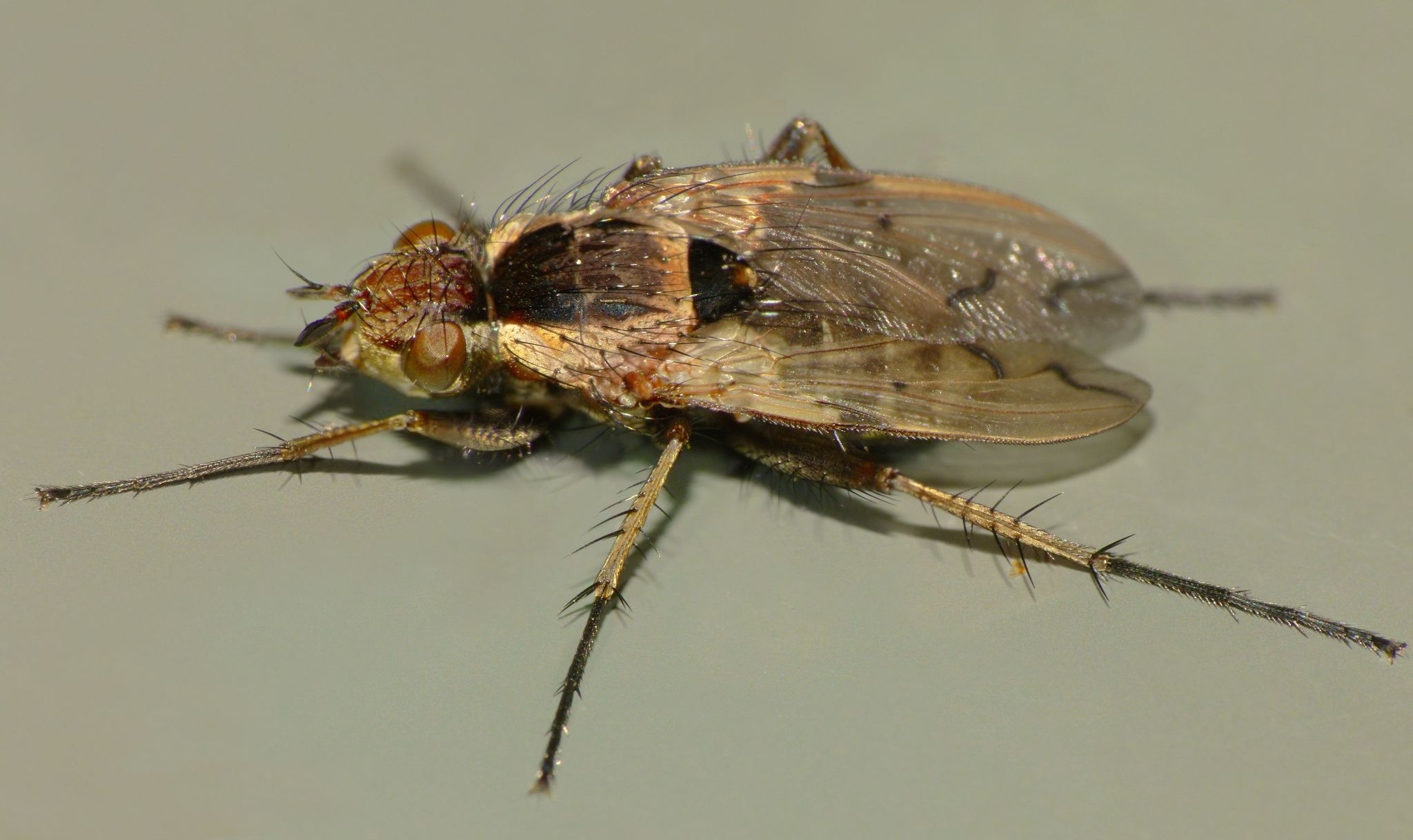

Scientific classification
- Kingdom: Animalia
- Phylum: Arthropoda
- Class: Insecta
- Order: Diptera
- Family: Tachinidae
- Subfamily: Tachininae
- Tribe: Proscissionini
- Genus: Pygocalcager; Townsend, 1935

Type species
- Pygocalcager humeratum Hutton, 1901

= Pygocalcager =

Genus of flies

Pygocalcager is a genus of flies in the family Tachinidae. Currently only one member of the genus has been described, Pygocalcager humeratum, which is endemic to New Zealand and was originally described as Calcager humeratum by Hutton in 1901. This was moved to its own genus in 1935 by Charles Henry Tyler Townsend.
