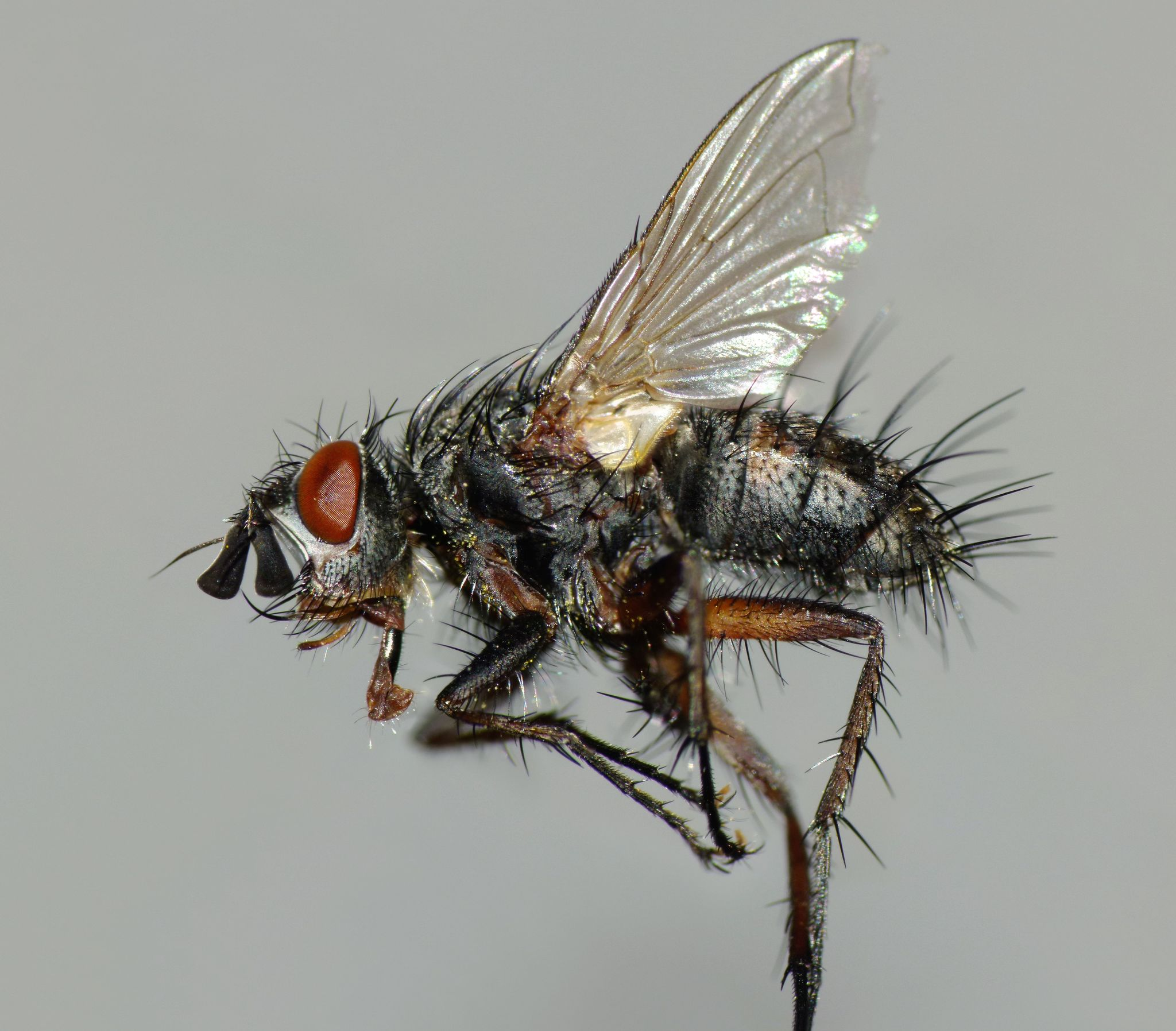
- Campylia sp.

Scientific classification
- Kingdom: Animalia
- Phylum: Arthropoda
- Class: Insecta
- Order: Diptera
- Family: Tachinidae
- Subfamily: Tachininae
- Tribe: Proscissionini
- Genus: Campylia; Malloch, 1938

Type species
- Calcager temerarium Hutton, 1901

= Campylia =

Genus of flies

Campylia is a genus of flies in the family Tachinidae.

== Species ==
- Campylia nudara Malloch, 1938
- Campylia temerarium (Hutton, 1901)

== Distribution ==
New Zealand.
