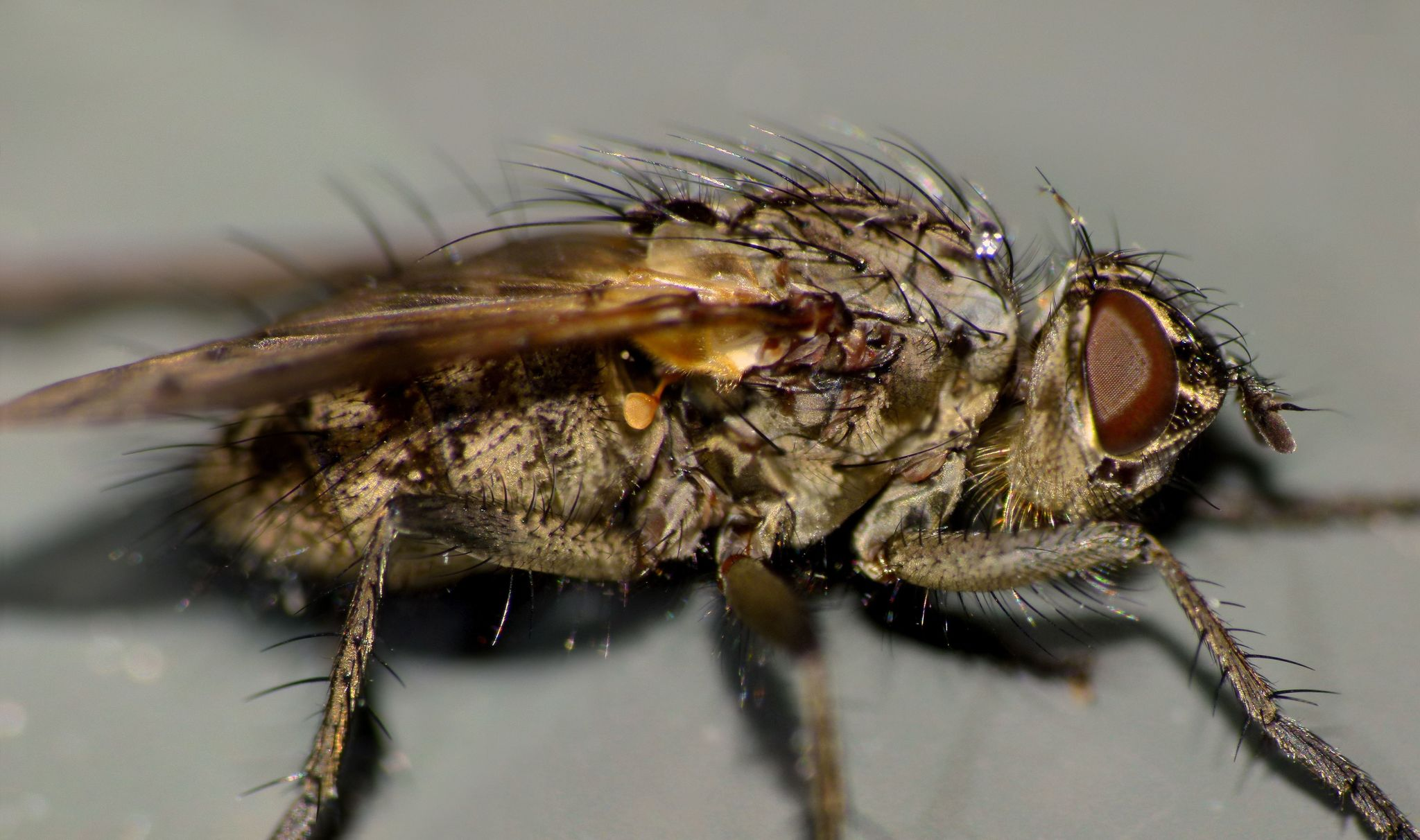
- Mallochomacquartia vexata

Scientific classification
- Kingdom: Animalia
- Phylum: Arthropoda
- Class: Insecta
- Order: Diptera
- Family: Tachinidae
- Subfamily: Tachininae
- Tribe: Proscissionini
- Genus: Mallochomacquartia; Townsend, 1934

Type species
- Macquartia vexata Hutton, 1901

= Mallochomacquartia =

Genus of flies

Mallochomacquartia is a genus of flies in the family Tachinidae.

== Species ==
- Mallochomacquartia flavohirta (Malloch, 1938)
- Mallochomacquartia nigrihirta (Malloch, 1938)
- Mallochomacquartia vexata (Hutton, 1901)

== Distribution ==
New Zealand.
