= Proscissionini =

Scientific classification
- Kingdom: Animalia
- Phylum: Arthropoda
- Class: Insecta
- Order: Diptera
- Family: Tachinidae
- Subfamily: Tachininae
- Tribe: Proscissionini

Tribe of flies

Proscissionini is a tribe of bristle flies in the family Tachinidae.

All genera are only found in New Zealand.

== Genera ==
- Altaia Malloch, 1938
- Asetulia Malloch, 1938
- Austromacquartia Townsend, 1934
- Avibrissia Malloch, 1932
- Avibrissina Malloch, 1932
- Bothrophora Schiner, 1868
- Calosia Malloch, 1938
- Campylia Malloch, 1938
- Chaetopletha Malloch, 1938
- Erythronychia Brauer & von Bergenstamm, 1891
- Gracilicera Miller, 1945
- Graphotachina Malloch, 1938
- Heteria Malloch, 1930
- Mallochomacquartia Townsend, 1934
- Medinella Dugdale, 1969
- Neoerythronychia Malloch, 1932
- Neotachina Malloch, 1938
- Occisor Hutton, 1901
- Peremptor Hutton, 1901
- Perrissina Malloch, 1938
- Perrissinoides Dugdale, 1962
- Phaoniella Malloch, 1938
- Platytachina Malloch, 1938
- Plethochaetigera Malloch, 1938
- Proscissio Hutton, 1901
- Prosenosoma Malloch, 1938
- Pygocalcager Townsend, 1935
- Tachineo Malloch, 1938
- Veluta Malloch, 1938
- Zealandotachina Malloch, 1938
