= Zealandotachina =

Scientific classification
- Kingdom: Animalia
- Phylum: Arthropoda
- Class: Insecta
- Order: Diptera
- Family: Tachinidae
- Subfamily: Tachininae
- Tribe: Proscissionini
- Genus: Zealandotachina; Malloch, 1938

Type species
- Macquartia subtilis Hutton, 1901

Genus of flies

Zealandotachina is a genus of flies in the family Tachinidae.

== Species ==
- Zealandotachina infuscata Malloch, 1938
- Zealandotachina lamellata Malloch, 1938
- Zealandotachina latifrons Malloch, 1938
- Zealandotachina nigrifemorata Malloch, 1938
- Zealandotachina quadriseta Malloch, 1938
- Zealandotachina quadrivittata Malloch, 1938
- Zealandotachina setigera Malloch, 1938
- Zealandotachina subtilis (Hutton, 1901)
- Zealandotachina tenuis Malloch, 1938
- Zealandotachina varipes Malloch, 1938

== Distribution ==
New Zealand.
