= Coelotrochus rex =

Scientific classification
- Kingdom: Animalia
- Phylum: Mollusca
- Class: Gastropoda
- Subclass: Vetigastropoda
- Order: Trochida
- Family: Trochidae
- Genus: Coelotrochus
- Species: C. rex

Binomial name
- Coelotrochus rex (Marshall, 1998)

Synonyms
- Thoristella rex Marshall, 1998 (original combination)

Species of gastropod

Coelotrochus rex is a species of small sea snail, a marine gastropod mollusk in the family Trochidae, the top snails.

== Description ==
The shells of most species of sea snails are spirally coiled. The height of the shell attains 15 mm, its diameter 18 mm.

== Distribution ==
This marine species is endemic to New Zealand and occurs off Three Kings Islands.
