= Avibrissina =

Scientific classification
- Kingdom: Animalia
- Phylum: Arthropoda
- Class: Insecta
- Order: Diptera
- Family: Tachinidae
- Subfamily: Tachininae
- Tribe: Proscissionini
- Genus: Avibrissina; Malloch, 1932

Type species
- Avibrissina brevipalpis Malloch, 1932

Genus of flies

Avibrissina is a genus of flies in the family Tachinidae.

== Species ==
- Avibrissina brevipalpis Malloch, 1932
- Avibrissina laticornis Malloch, 1938

== Distribution ==
New Zealand.
