= Erythronychia =

Scientific classification
- Kingdom: Animalia
- Phylum: Arthropoda
- Class: Insecta
- Order: Diptera
- Family: Tachinidae
- Subfamily: Tachininae
- Tribe: Proscissionini
- Genus: Erythronychia; Brauer & von Berganstamm, 1891

Type species
- Demoticus australiensis Schiner, 1868

Genus of flies

Erythronychia is a genus of flies in the family Tachinidae.

== Species ==
- Erythronychia aliena Malloch, 1932
- Erythronychia aperta Malloch, 1932
- Erythronychia australiensis (Schiner, 1868)
- Erythronychia defecta Malloch, 1932
- Erythronychia grisea Malloch, 1932
- Erythronychia hirticeps Malloch, 1932
- Erythronychia minor Malloch, 1932
- Erythronychia princeps (Curran, 1927)
- Erythronychia velutina Malloch, 1932

== Distribution ==
New Zealand.
