= Calosia =

Scientific classification
- Kingdom: Animalia
- Phylum: Arthropoda
- Class: Insecta
- Order: Diptera
- Family: Tachinidae
- Subfamily: Tachininae
- Tribe: Proscissionini
- Genus: Calosia; Malloch, 1938

Type species
- Zealandotachina binigra Malloch, 1938

Genus of flies

Calosia is a genus of flies in the family Tachinidae.

== Species ==
- Calosia binigra (Malloch, 1938)

== Distribution ==
New Zealand.
