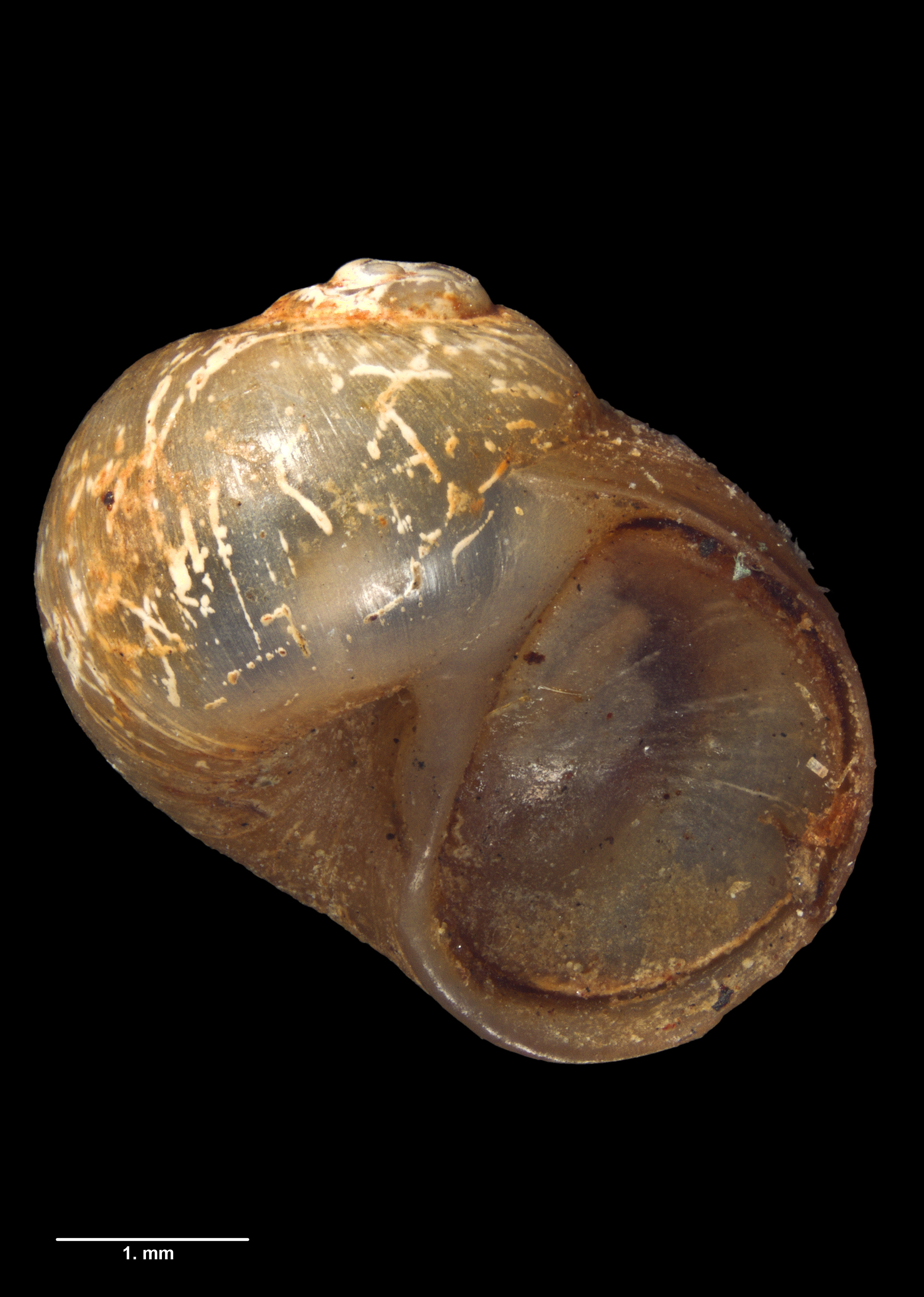
- Holotype from Auckland War Memorial Museum

Scientific classification
- Kingdom: Animalia
- Phylum: Mollusca
- Class: Gastropoda
- Subclass: Caenogastropoda
- Order: Littorinimorpha
- Family: Naticidae
- Genus: Proxiuber
- Species: P. hulmei

Binomial name
- Proxiuber hulmei A. W. B. Powell, 1938

= Proxiuber hulmei =

Species of gastropod

Proxiuber hulmei is a species of sea snail, a marine gastropod mollusc in the family Naticidae. It is endemic to New Zealand, found off the coast of the northern North Island, between Cape Reinga in the northwest and the Māhia Peninsula to the east, at depths ranging between 59–207 m (194–679 ft), with additional specimens found on Manawatāwhi / Three Kings Islands and the Chatham Islands. The species can be identified due to the presence of two broad spirals formed from reddish-brown splotches.

== Description ==
In the original description, Powell described the species as follows:

Shell of similar size to [P. australe] but proportionately broader, not so globose, with a distinctive colour pattern of two broad spiral zones of rectangular axial dark reddish-brown markings on a white ground covered by a very thin buff epidermis. Umbilicus a more convex crescent than in [P. australe], widely open, although half filled by the funicle and columellar callus. The two colour zones are both broad, the first subsutural and the second peripheral. They are separated by a clear space equal to half the width of a colour zone and the lower part of the base, almost equal to the width of a colour zone, is clear also. The surface 1s smooth and glossy, with faint, closely-spaced axial growth lines. The operculum is calcareous, smooth, white, paucispiral with two faint grooves margining the outer edge.

The species measures an average of5 mm (0.20 in) height and 5 mm (0.20 in) diameter, and the holotype of the species has a height of 4.2 mm (0.17 in) and a diameter of 4.5 mm (0.18 in). The species can be identified due to its two broad spirals formed from reddish-brown splotches, and can be differentiated from P. australe due to its smaller size and by being proportionately wider.

== Taxonomy ==
The species was first described by A.W.B. Powell in 1954. The holotype was collected at an unknown date prior to 1955 from an unknown location near Auckland by trawler. It is held by the Auckland War Memorial Museum.

== Distribution ==
P. hulmei is endemic to the waters of New Zealand, found off the coast of northern New Zealand between Cape Reinga and the Māhia Peninsula, at depths ranging between 59–207 m (194–679 ft). Additionally, specimens have been found in the waters of Manawatāwhi / Three Kings Islands and the Chatham Islands.

== Gallery ==
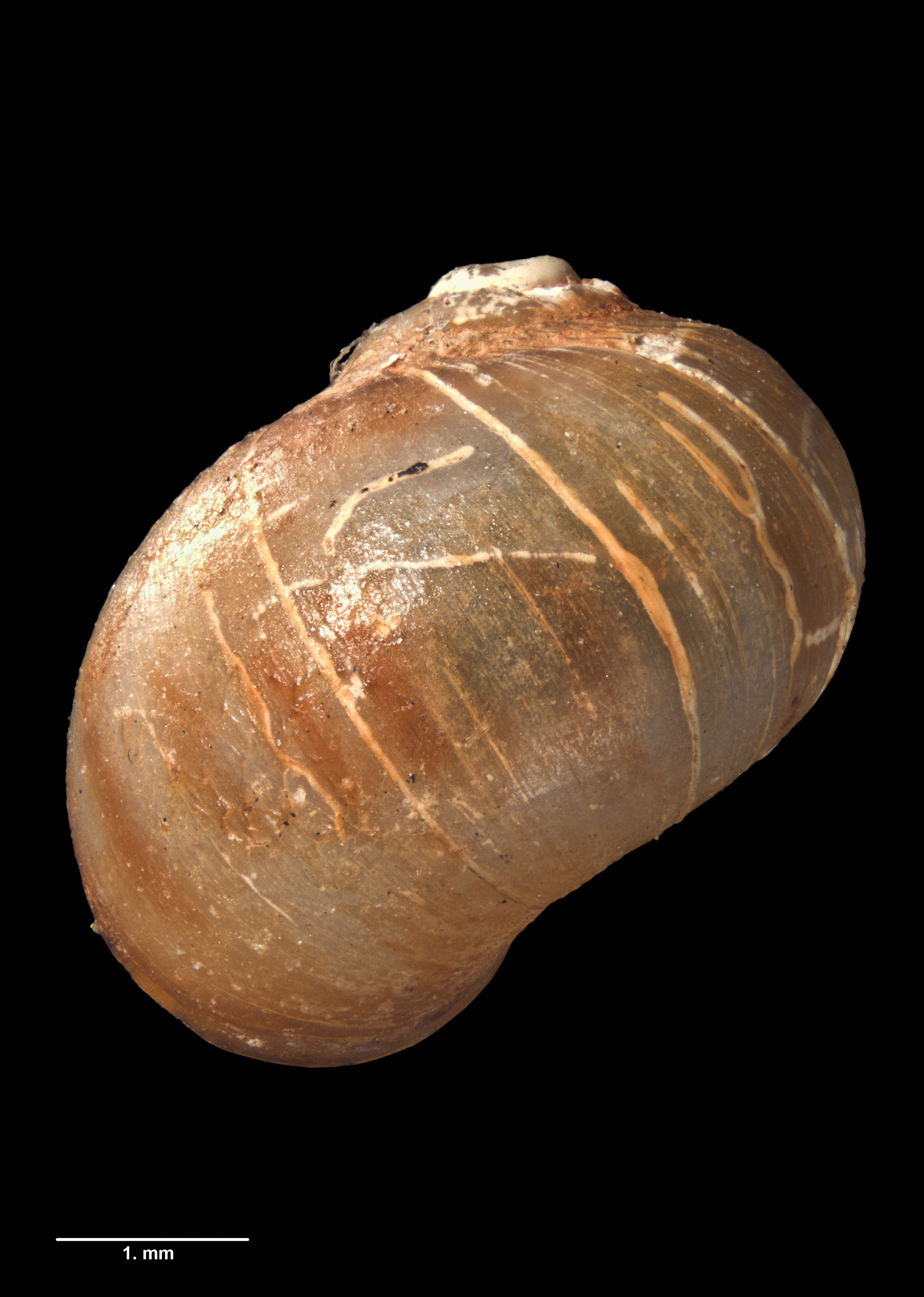
Reverse view of holotype

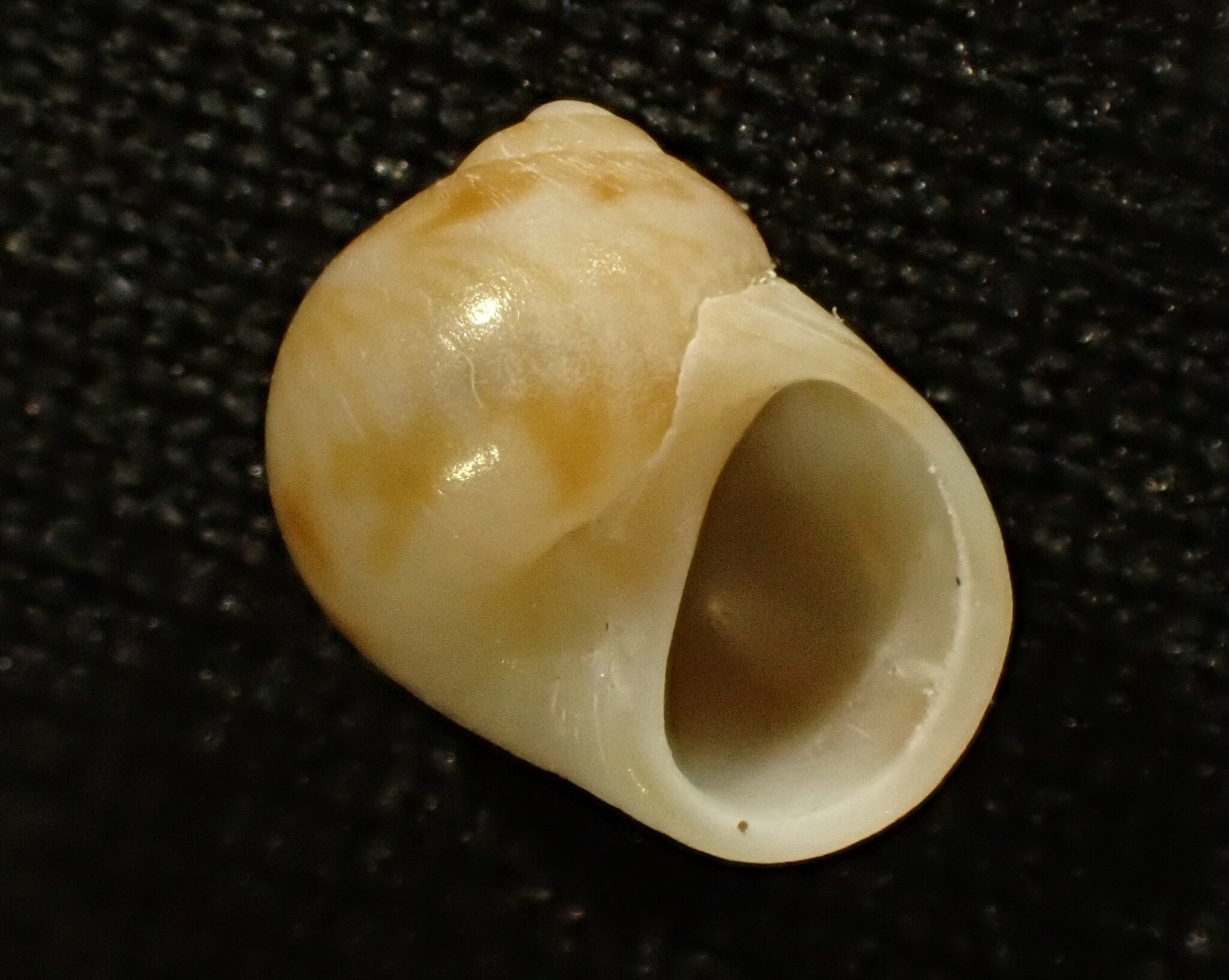
Specimen found off the coast of Mangawhai, Northland
