= Austromacquartia =

Scientific classification
- Kingdom: Animalia
- Phylum: Arthropoda
- Class: Insecta
- Order: Diptera
- Family: Tachinidae
- Subfamily: Tachininae
- Tribe: Proscissionini
- Genus: Austromacquartia; Townsend, 1934

Type species
- Macquartia claripennis Malloch, 1932

Genus of flies

Austromacquartia is a genus of flies in the family Tachinidae.

== Species ==
- Austromacquartia claripennis (Malloch, 1932)

== Distribution ==
New Zealand.
