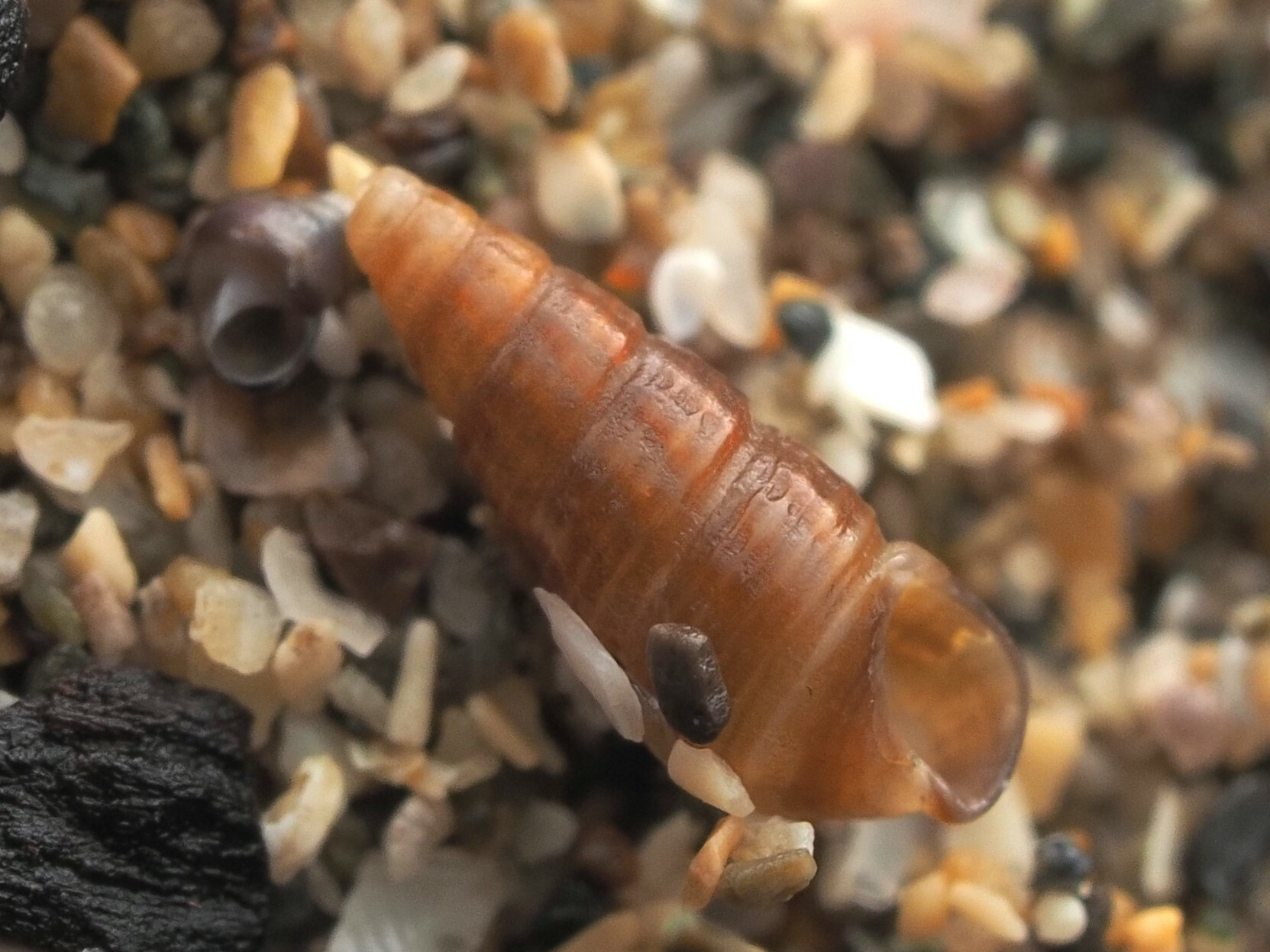

Scientific classification
- Domain: Eukaryota
- Kingdom: Animalia
- Phylum: Mollusca
- Class: Gastropoda
- Subclass: Caenogastropoda
- Family: Cerithiidae
- Genus: Zebittium
- Species: Z. exile

Binomial name
- Zebittium exile (Hutton, 1873)

Synonyms
- Bittium exile (Hutton, 1873); Cerithium exilis Hutton, 1873

= Zebittium exile =

Species of gastropod

Zebittium exile is a species of small sea snail, a marine gastropod mollusc or micromollusc in the family Cerithiidae, the cerithiids. It occurs only in New Zealand.
