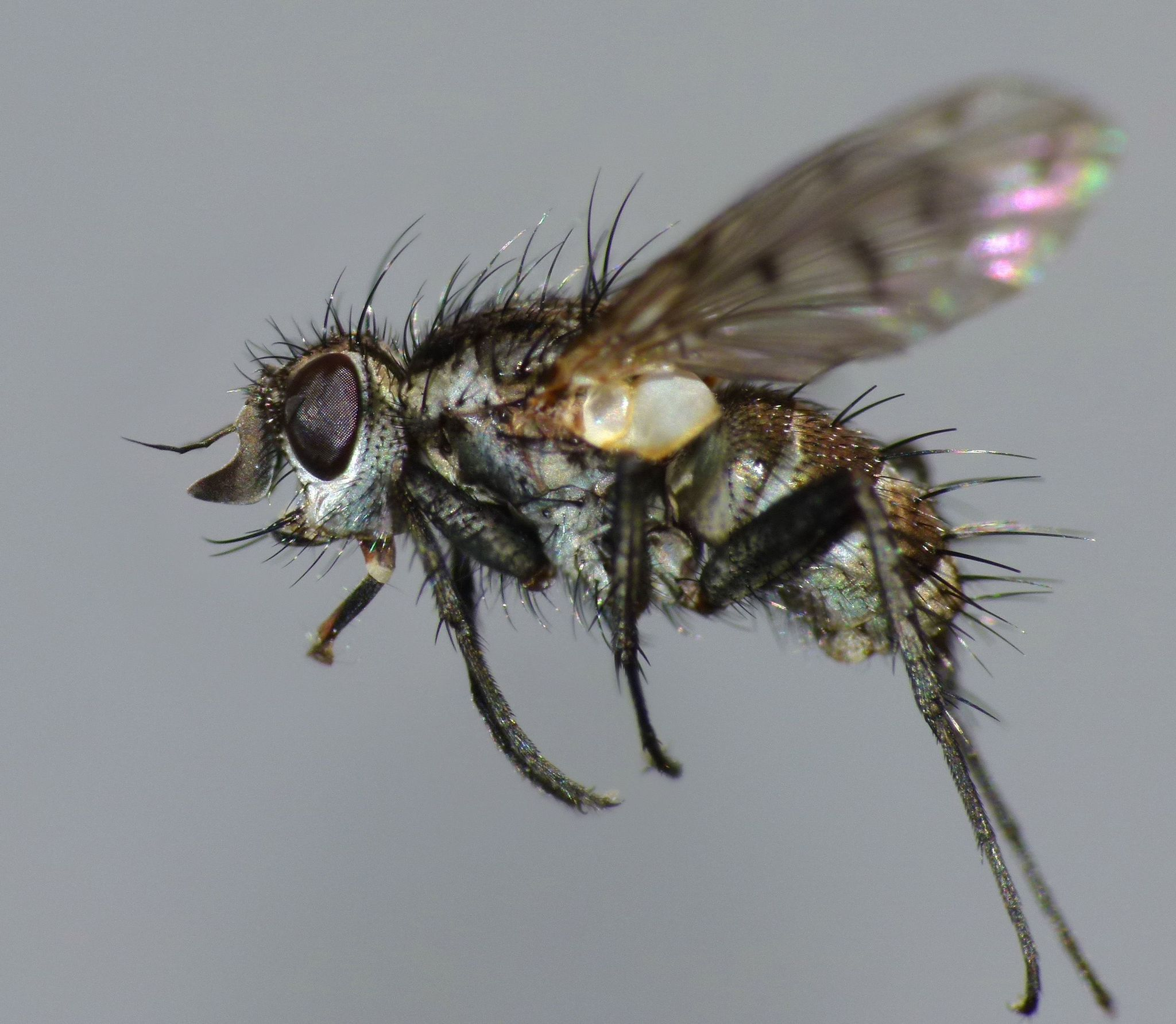
- Heteria appendiculata

Scientific classification
- Kingdom: Animalia
- Phylum: Arthropoda
- Class: Insecta
- Order: Diptera
- Family: Tachinidae
- Subfamily: Tachininae
- Tribe: Proscissionini
- Genus: Heteria; Malloch, 1930

Type species
- Heteria appendiculata Malloch, 1930

= Heteria =

Genus of flies

Heteria is a genus of flies in the family Tachinidae.

== Species ==
- Heteria appendiculata Malloch, 1930
- Heteria atripes Malloch, 1930
- Heteria extensa Malloch, 1930
- Heteria flavibasis Malloch, 1930
- Heteria plebia Malloch, 1930
- Heteria punctigera Malloch, 1930

== Distribution ==
New Zealand.
