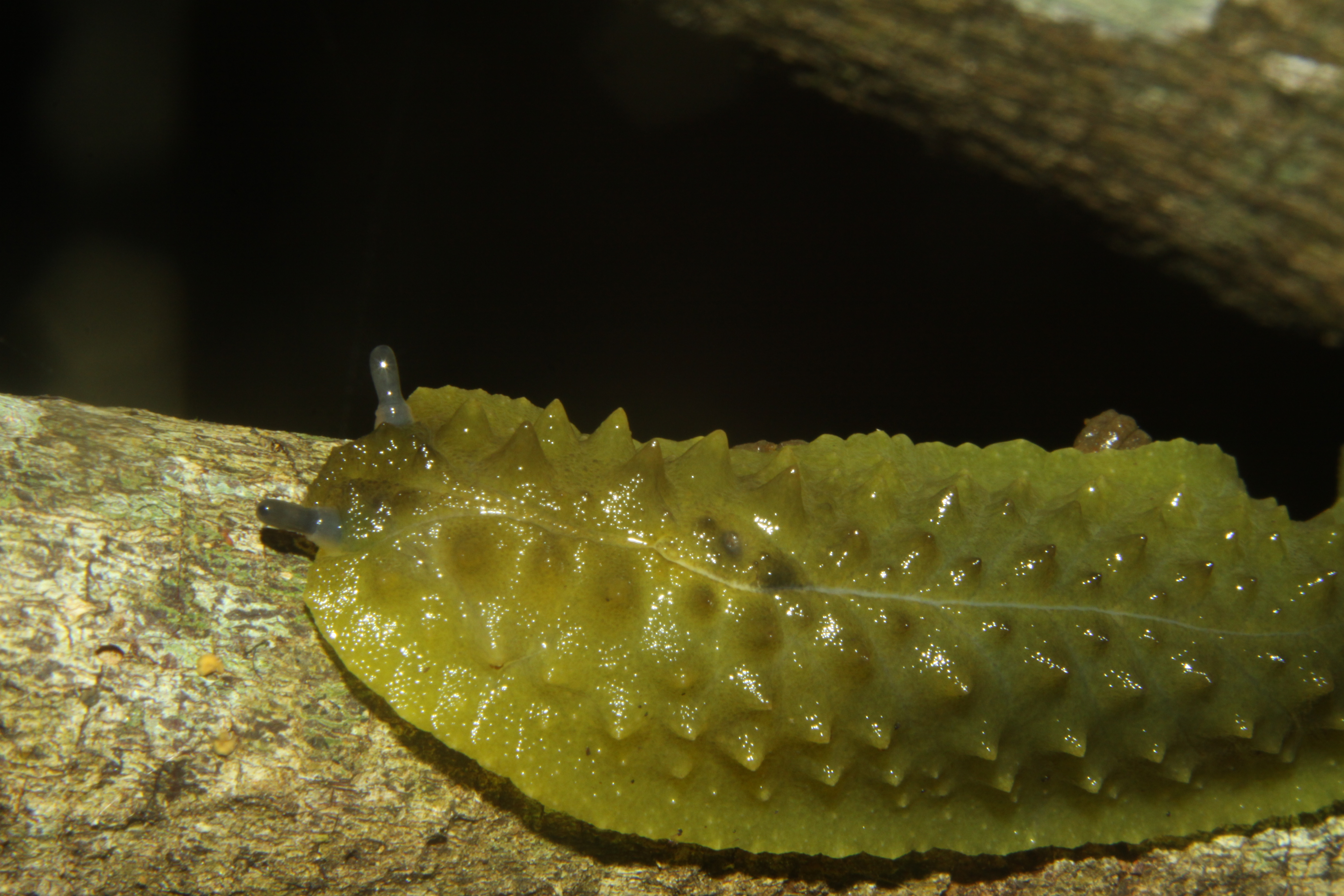

Scientific classification
- Kingdom: Animalia
- Phylum: Mollusca
- Class: Gastropoda
- Order: Stylommatophora
- Family: Athoracophoridae
- Genus: Pseudaneitea
- Species: P. papillata

Binomial name
- Pseudaneitea papillata (Hutton, 1879)

= Pseudaneitea papillata =

Species of gastropod

Pseudaneitea papillata is a species of air-breathing land slug, a terrestrial gastropod mollusc in the family Athoracophoridae, the leaf-veined slugs.

The species is sometimes colloquially referred to online as the New Zealand pickle slug.
