= Prosenosoma =

Scientific classification
- Kingdom: Animalia
- Phylum: Arthropoda
- Class: Insecta
- Order: Diptera
- Family: Tachinidae
- Subfamily: Tachininae
- Tribe: Proscissionini
- Genus: Prosenosoma; Malloch, 1938

Type species
- Prosenosoma greyi Malloch, 1938

Genus of flies

Prosenosoma is a monotypic genus of flies in the family Tachinidae. It contains a single species, Prosenosoma greyi, which is endemic to New Zealand.
