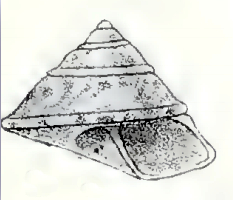
- Drawing of a shell of Coelotrochus chathamensis

Scientific classification
- Kingdom: Animalia
- Phylum: Mollusca
- Class: Gastropoda
- Subclass: Vetigastropoda
- Order: Trochida
- Superfamily: Trochoidea
- Family: Trochidae
- Genus: Coelotrochus
- Species: C. chathamensis

Binomial name
- Coelotrochus chathamensis (Hutton, 1873)

Synonyms
- Calliostoma aucklandicum E. A. Smith, 1902; Coelotrochus chathamensis aucklandica (E.A. Smith, 1902); Coelotrochus chathamensis dunedinensis Suter, H., 1897; Coelotrochus chathamensis profunda Dell, 1956; Polydonta chathamensis Hutton, 1873 (basionym); Thoristella chathamensis (Hutton, 1873); Thoristella chathamensis cookiana Powell, 1934; Thoristella chathamensis dunedinensis Suter, H., 1897; Thoristella cookiana Powell, A.W.B., 1934; Trochus chathamensis (Hutton, 1873); Trochus chathamensis benthicola Finlay, 1927; Trochus opressus dunedinensis Suter, 1897

= Coelotrochus chathamensis =

Species of gastropod

Coelotrochus chathamensis is a species of small sea snail, a marine gastropod mollusc in the family Trochidae, the top snails or top shells.

== Description ==
The length of the shell varies between eight mm and 10 mm. The small shell has a conical shape, the sides are straight or slightly convex. The angle of the spire is 70°. The five, rarely six, whorls are flat with an elevated upper edge, and, together with the base, spirally striated. The pointed protoconch is regularly conical, and consists of about two whorls. These are not marked off from the succeeding whorl. This one is, smooth, with two or three spiral red bands. The last two whorls increase rapidly in size. They are flat to slightly convex above, concave below before reaching the strong and prominent cingulum. The body whorl has a distinct peripheric keel.

The sculpture consists of five to six low spiral threads, the lower and upper margins much elevated, especially the former. They are crossed by broad nodulous radiate ribs, which, however, do not extend over the lower half of the whorl. These ribs are often obsolete. The suture is superficial, with a nodulous border below. The false umbilicus is narrow and not very deep. The oblique aperture is rhomboidal. The outer and basal lip are a little convex, forming a sharp angle where they meet.

The oblique columella is slightly concave. It has an almost imperceptible posterior fold, but the anterior portion is nearly smooth. The axial cavity is small and smooth. The color of the shell is white, buff with pink or oblique brownish purple stripes or spots. The flat base of the shell is white with interrupted pink, subequal spiral lines.

== Distribution ==
Coelotrochus chathamensis is endemic to New Zealand and occurs the Chatham Islands, Southern North Island, Stewart Islands and the Auckland Islands.
