= Medinella =

Scientific classification
- Kingdom: Animalia
- Phylum: Arthropoda
- Class: Insecta
- Order: Diptera
- Family: Tachinidae
- Subfamily: Tachininae
- Tribe: Proscissionini
- Genus: Medinella; Dugdale, 1969

Type species
- Medinella nigrifemorata Malloch, 1938

Synonyms
- Medinella Malloch, 1938

Genus of flies

Medinella is a genus of tachinid flies in the family Tachinidae.

== Species ==
- Medinella albifrons Malloch, 1938
- Medinella flavofemorata Malloch, 1938
- Medinella nigrifemorata Malloch, 1938
- Medinella varipes Malloch, 1938

== Distribution ==
New Zealand.
