= Leuconopsis =

Scientific classification
- Kingdom: Animalia
- Phylum: Mollusca
- Class: Gastropoda
- Order: Ellobiida
- Family: Ellobiidae
- Subfamily: Carychiinae
- Genus: Leuconopsis; Hutton, 1884

Type species
- Leuconia obsoleta Hutton, 1873

Genus of gastropods

Leuconopsis is a genus of minute air-breathing land snails, terrestrial pulmonate gastropod molluscs in the family Ellobiidae.

== Species ==
Species within the genus Leucanopsis include:

- Leuconopsis inermis Hedley, 1901
- Leuconopsis manningi Martins, 1996
- Leuconopsis novimundi (Pilsbry & McGinty, 1949)
- Leuconopsis obsoleta (Hutton, 1873)
- Leuconopsis pacifica Oliver, 1915
- Leuconopsis pellucida (D. Cooper, 1841)
- † Leuconopsis putealis Laws, 1950
- Leuconopsis rapanuiensis Rehder, 1980

Species brought into synonymy

- Leuconopsis pellucidus [sic]: synonym of Leuconopsis pellucida (D. Cooper, 1841)
- Leuconopsis tatei Gatliff, 1905: synonym of Leuconopsis pellucida (D. Cooper, 1841)
- Leuconopsis victoriae Gatliff, 1905: synonym of Leuconopsis pellucida (D. Cooper, 1841)
