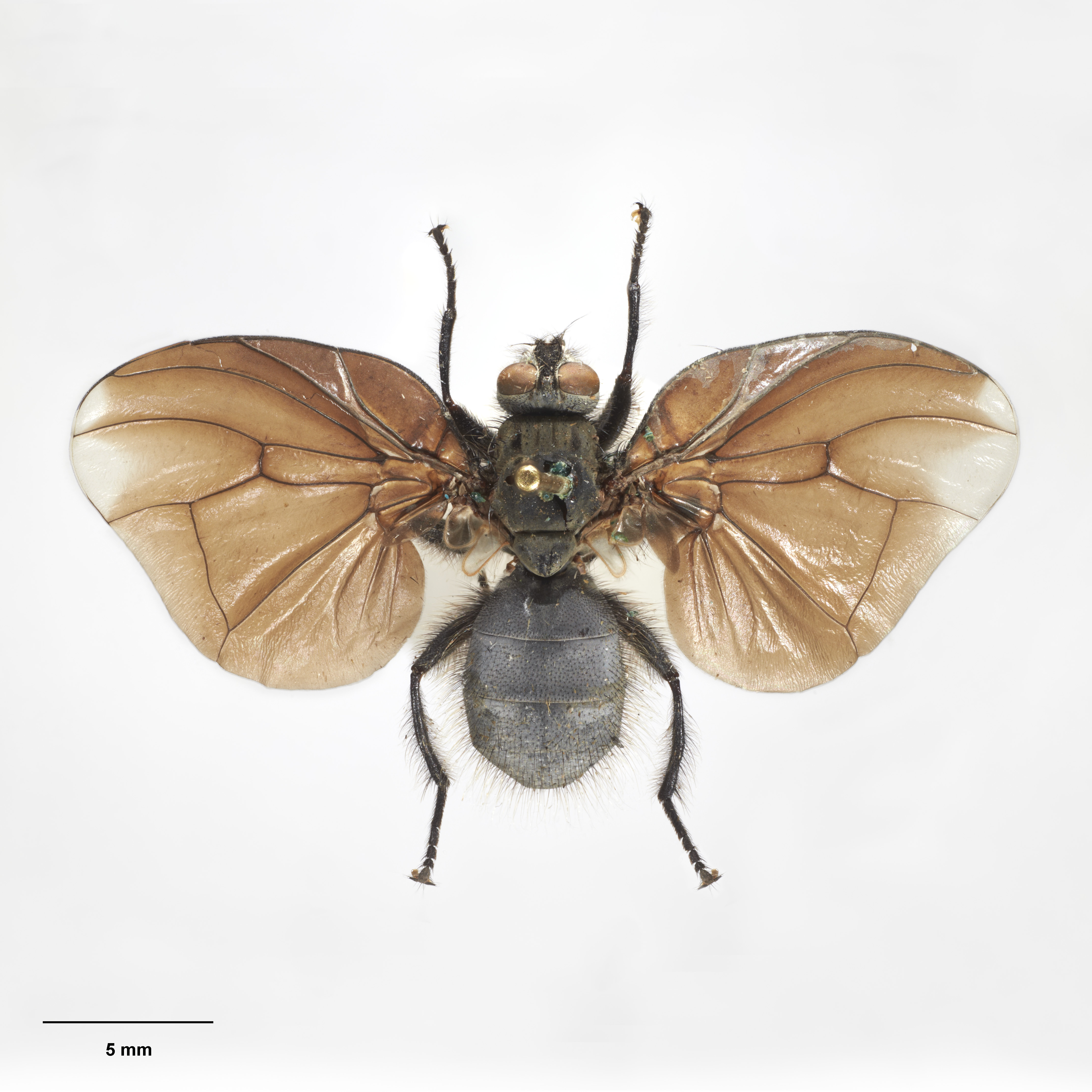

Scientific classification
- Kingdom: Animalia
- Phylum: Arthropoda
- Class: Insecta
- Order: Diptera
- Family: Muscidae
- Genus: Exsul
- Species: E. singularis

Binomial name
- Exsul singularis Hutton, 1901

= Exsul singularis =

Species of fly endemic to New Zealand

Exsul singularis, the bat-winged fly, is a species of fly that is endemic to New Zealand, first described by Frederick Hutton in 1901. The males have enormously expanded wings. The species is found in the south-western South Island and occurs mostly in high-altitude meadows near streams. It preys on soft-bodied flying insects and is believed to uses its wings to increase its body temperature to offset the cool temperatures of its alpine habitat.

== Taxonomy ==
This species was first described by Frederick Hutton in 1901, from a single male specimen collected in Milford Sound by the botanist Arnold Wall. In his paper on the 171 or 172 native flies of New Zealand in the suborder Brachycera, Hutton noted the most remarkable species were Exsul singularis and Cerosomyia usitata. He considered it to be "clearly belonging to the Anthomyidae", but its exact relationships were unclear for some time; it was eventually placed in the family Muscidae. The female of E. singularis was described over a century later, by Barbosa and Couri in 2013. There are currently two other species in the genus Exsul, but neither have the expanded wings of E. singularis.

== Etymology ==
The genus Exsul created by Hutton for this species means "exile" in Latin, perhaps referring to the remote location the first specimen was captured in. The specific epithet singularis conveys, as Hutton puts it, that it is "very different in appearance from any other fly".

In 1990 Mike Meads called the species the "batwinged cannibal fly", believing it belonged to the family Anthomyiidae, which have "cannibal fly" as one of their common names. Patrick pointed out there is no evidence these flies prey on each other, and recommended they be referred to as "bat-winged flies".

== Description ==
Apart from its wings, this species resembles a plump dark grey to black housefly with two dark stripes running head to tail along the thorax. Males of this species are distinctive in having very broad, rounded wings; the wings of females are of average size for a muscid fly. Male wings are dark brown with some transparent patches at the trailing edge of the wing, and the leading edge mottled with grey; female wings are more conventional but with the veins traced with brown on each side. Males are 13 mm in length with 15 mm wings, so a total wingspan of 25–30 mm; females are 11 mm long with 13 mm wings. Males also have extremely hairy legs.

== Range and habitat ==
E. singularis is found in the alpine regions of the west and south of the South Island of New Zealand, from the Paparoa Range to northern Fiordland. The first specimen was collected in Milford Sound, and the second by George Hudson on 10 February 1911 beside a stream in the Routeburn Valley, near Lake Wakatipu. Hudson's daughter collected another in January 1921 at Bold Peak, Lake Wakitipu. Other specimens have been taken in Arthur's Pass, near Franz Josef and Fox Glaciers, Mount Earnslaw, around the Homer Tunnel, on the Milford Track, and most frequently at McKinnon Pass where both other Exsul species also occur. Most records have been at altitudes over 1000 m, and it ranges from 760 m to at least 1800 m. The species inhabits low-alpine to alpine scree slopes and meadows near streams, a habitat shared by the butterfly Erebiola butleri.

== Ecology ==
Nearly a hundred bat-winged flies have been observed sunbathing on flat rocks at an altitude of 1,100–1,370 metres (3,610–4,490 ft) in Mount Aspiring National Park near Haast. This species preys on soft-bodied flying insects, including moths, butterflies, and emerging aquatic insects; Hudson recorded a specimen of E. singularis was captured in the act of consuming "a small trichopteran". This species uses its wings to absorb the heat of the sun, helping it to increase its body temperature and enabling it to fly in the cool mountain air. No larvae have been found, and nothing is known about its life history or breeding behaviour.

== Conservation ==
E. singularis acquired a reputation for extreme rarity; Meads referred to it as the "world's rarest fly", and its conservation status was at one point I for "Indeterminate". Nevertheless Patrick noted in 1996 that there were sixty-five specimens in museums around the world. The 26 specimens held in Auckland War Memorial Museum at the time represented 40 per cent of the world's collections.

Patrick concluded that its inaccessible habitat had given it a reputation for rarity, but that it was common in suitable habitat over its large home range. Its swift flight and short period of activity make it less commonly encountered and difficult to catch. The Department of Conservation threat status of E. singularis is currently "Not Threatened".
