= Coelotrochus carmesinus =

- Drawing of a shell of Coelotrochus carmesinus

Scientific classification
- Kingdom: Animalia
- Phylum: Mollusca
- Class: Gastropoda
- Subclass: Vetigastropoda
- Order: Trochida
- Superfamily: Trochoidea
- Family: Trochidae
- Genus: Coelotrochus
- Species: C. carmesinus

Binomial name
- Coelotrochus carmesinus (Webster, 1908)

Synonyms
- Coelotrochus carmesina (Webster, 1908); Monilea carmesina Webster, 1908; Thoristella carmesina (Webster, 1908); Trochus carmesinus Webster, 1908 (original combination)

Species of gastropod

Coelotrochus carmesinus is a species of sea snail, a marine gastropod mollusk in the family Trochidae, the top snails.

== Description ==
The height of the shell attains 5 mm, its diameter 8 mm. The small, shining, crimson, depressed shell has a trochiform shape. It is umbilicated, spirally striated, an rather solid. The sculpture of the post -embryonic whorls consist of fine somewhat unequal spiral striae, with linear interspaces. These number about 20 on the upper surface of the body whorl, and a similar number on the base. A narrow smooth band winds round the peripheral angle. The umbilicus is margined by a broadly rounded funicle. The colour of the shell is pale pink, with radiate crimson streaks on the second and third whorls. The succeeding whorls are crimson with occasional lighter streaks. The periphery of the body whorl has semicircular small white spots, usually two together, and at subequal distances. The aperture is iridescent within. The umbilicus and the columella are white. The spire is broadly conical, about 1½ times the height of the aperture. The outlines are lightly convex. The protoconch consists of 1½ smooth whorls, small and flattish. The teleoconch contains five whorls. The first increases slowly, then more rapidly, the upper half convex, the lower slightly concave. The periphery of the body whorl is roundly angled. The base of the shell is almost flat. The suture is superficial. The oblique aperture is subrhomboidal. The outer lip is descending, very lightly convex, and forms an acute angle with the faintly arched basal lip. Both are strengthened inside by a thin callus. The oblique columella is straight with a distinct tubercle above, and a small denticle at the base. The deep umbilicus is moderate, extending to the initial whorl, about one-sixth of the greatest diameter. The descending cord is distinctly visible.

== Distribution ==
This marine species is endemic to New Zealand and occurs off Northland to East Cape.
