= Avibrissia =

Scientific classification
- Kingdom: Animalia
- Phylum: Arthropoda
- Class: Insecta
- Order: Diptera
- Family: Tachinidae
- Subfamily: Tachininae
- Tribe: Proscissionini
- Genus: Avibrissia; Malloch, 1932

Type species
- Avibrissia longirostris Malloch, 1932

Genus of flies

Avibrissia is a genus of flies in the family Tachinidae.

== Species ==
- Avibrissia longirostris Malloch, 1932

== Distribution ==
New Zealand.
