= Perrissinoides =

Scientific classification
- Kingdom: Animalia
- Phylum: Arthropoda
- Class: Insecta
- Order: Diptera
- Family: Tachinidae
- Subfamily: Tachininae
- Tribe: Proscissionini
- Genus: Perrissinoides; Dugdale, 1962

Type species
- Perrissinoides cerambycivorae Dugdale, 1962

Genus of flies

Perrissinoides is a genus of flies in the family Tachinidae.

== Species ==
- Perrissinoides cerambycivora Dugdale, 1962
- Perrissinoides cerambycivorae Dugdale, 1962

== Distribution ==
New Zealand.
