= Coelotrochus davegibbsi =

Scientific classification
- Kingdom: Animalia
- Phylum: Mollusca
- Class: Gastropoda
- Subclass: Vetigastropoda
- Order: Trochida
- Family: Trochidae
- Genus: Coelotrochus
- Species: C. davegibbsi

Binomial name
- Coelotrochus davegibbsi Marshall, 1998

Synonyms
- Thoristella davegibbsi Marshall, 1998

Species of gastropod

Coelotrochus davegibbsi is a species of sea snail, a marine gastropod mollusk in the family Trochidae, the top snails.

== Description ==
The width of the shell attains 6.5 mm.

== Distribution ==
This marine species is endemic to New Zealand and occurs off Three Kings Islands.

== Bibliography ==
- Marshall B.A. 1998. A review of the Recent Trochini of New Zealand (Mollusca: Gastropoda: Trochidae). Molluscan Research 19(1): 73-106
- Spencer, H.G.; Marshall, B.A.; Maxwell, P.A.; Grant-Mackie, J.A.; Stilwell, J.D.; Willan, R.C.; Campbell, H.J.; Crampton, J.S.; Henderson, R.A.; Bradshaw, M.A.; Waterhouse, J.B.; Pojeta, J. Jr (2009). Phylum Mollusca: chitons, clams, tusk shells, snails, squids, and kin, in: Gordon, D.P. (Ed.) (2009). New Zealand inventory of biodiversity: 1. Kingdom Animalia: Radiata, Lophotrochozoa, Deuterostomia. pp. 161–254
