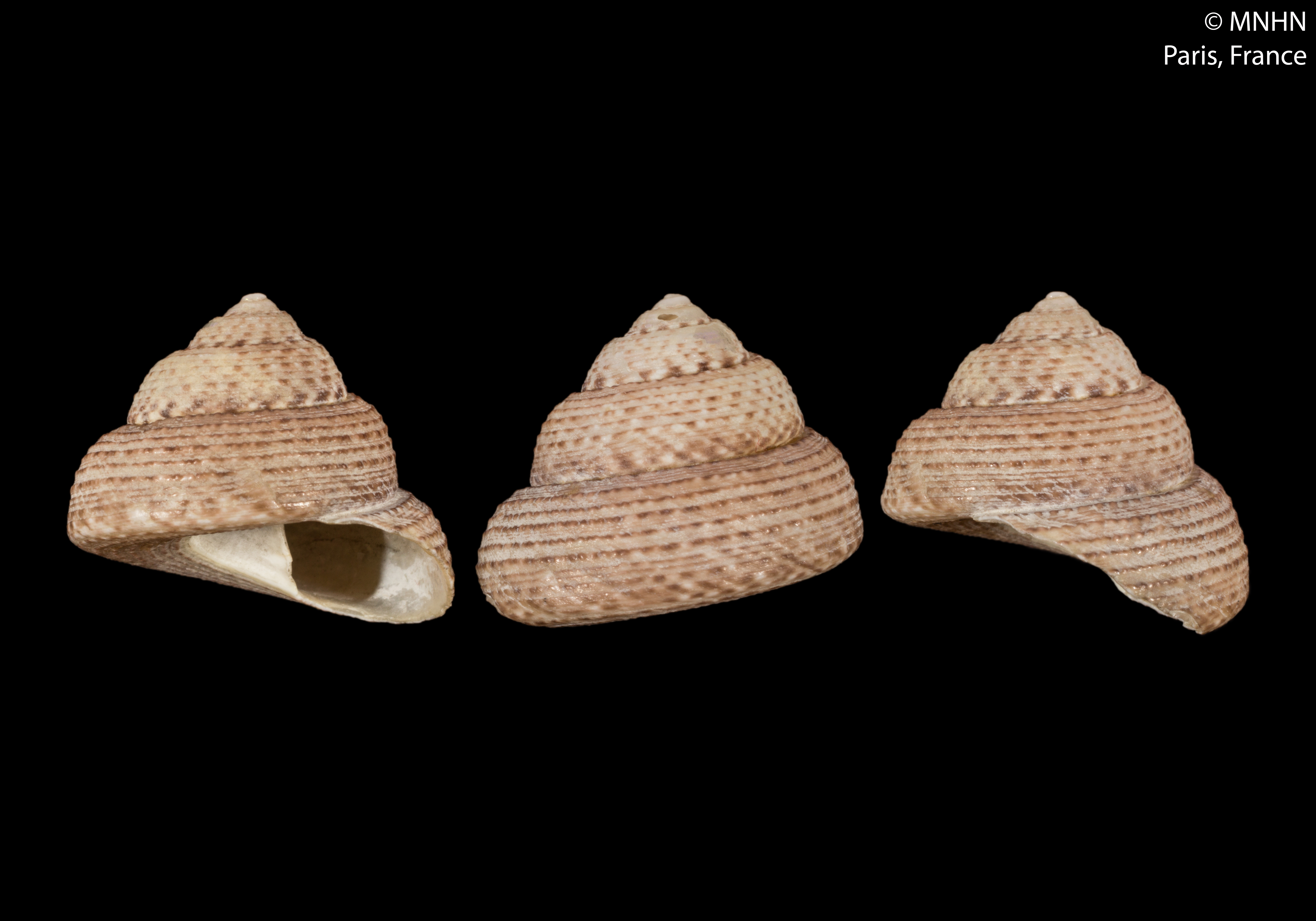
- Shell of Coelotrochus tiaratus (lectotype at MNHN, Paris)

Scientific classification
- Kingdom: Animalia
- Phylum: Mollusca
- Class: Gastropoda
- Subclass: Vetigastropoda
- Order: Trochida
- Superfamily: Trochoidea
- Family: Trochidae
- Genus: Coelotrochus; Fischer, 1880

Type species
- Coelotrochus tiaratus Quoy, H.E.T. & J.P. Gaimard, 1834

Synonyms
- Anthora Gray, 1857; Chlorostoma (Neozelandia) Cossmann, 1918; Thorista Iredale, 1915; Thoristella Iredale, 1915; Trochus (Anthora) Gray, 1857; Trochus (Coelotrochus) P. Fischer, 1879; Trochus (Thorista) Iredale, 1915

= Coelotrochus =

Genus of gastropods

Coelotrochus is a genus of small sea snails, marine gastropod mollusks in the family Trochidae, the top snails.

== Description ==
The false umbilicus is very deep and narrow, penetrating deeper than the columella, which is inserted upon its edge, not in the centre of the axis.

== Distribution ==
This marine genus is endemic to New Zealand.

== Species ==
Species within the genus Coelotrochus include:

- † Coelotrochus avarus (Suter, 1917)
- † Coelotrochus bibaphus (Bartrum & Powell, 1928)
- † Coelotrochus browni (C. A. Fleming, 1943)
- Coelotrochus carinatus (B. A. Marshall, 1998)
- Coelotrochus carmesinus (Webster, 1908)
- Coelotrochus chathamensis (Hutton, 1873)
- Coelotrochus davegibbsi (B. A. Marshall, 1998)
- † Coelotrochus fossilis (Finlay, 1926)
- † Coelotrochus gracilis (Laws, 1936)
- Coelotrochus oppressus (B. A. Marshall, 1998)
- Coelotrochus polychromus (B. A. Marshall, 1998)
- Coelotrochus rex (B. A. Marshall, 1998)
- Coelotrochus tiaratus (Quoy & Gaimard, 1834)
- Coelotrochus viridis (Gmelin, 1791)
