= Leuconopsis obsoleta =

Scientific classification
- Kingdom: Animalia
- Phylum: Mollusca
- Class: Gastropoda
- Order: Ellobiida
- Family: Ellobiidae
- Genus: Leuconopsis
- Species: L. obsoleta

Binomial name
- Leuconopsis obsoleta (Hutton, 1878)

Synonyms
- Leuconia obsoleta Hutton, 1878; Leuconia inermis Suter, 1913; Leuconopsis obsoleta Powell, 1933

Species of gastropod

Leuconopsis obsoleta is a species of small air-breathing land snail, a terrestrial pulmonate gastropod mollusc in the family Ellobiidae.
