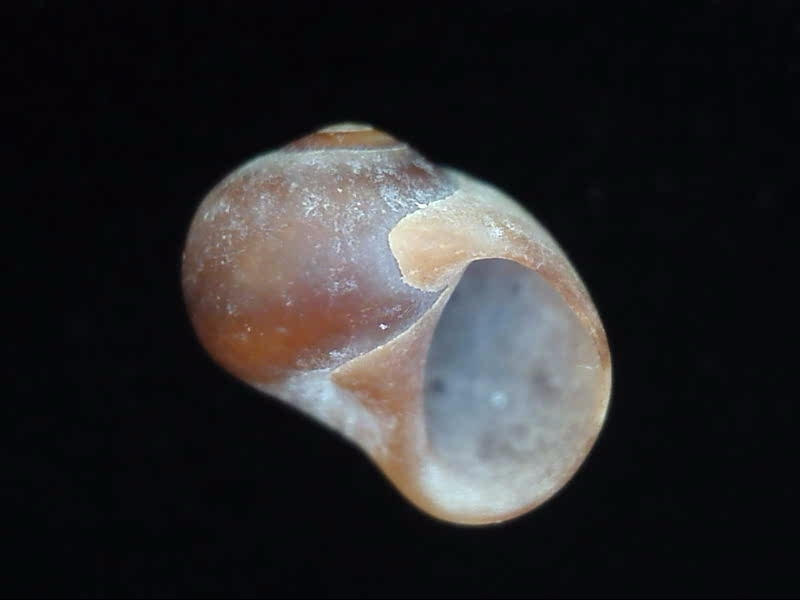
- Proxiuber australe

Scientific classification
- Kingdom: Animalia
- Phylum: Mollusca
- Class: Gastropoda
- Subclass: Caenogastropoda
- Order: Littorinimorpha
- Family: Naticidae
- Genus: Proxiuber; A. W. B. Powell, 1933

Type species
- Lunatia australis F. W. Hutton, 1878

Synonyms
- Natica (Proxiuber) (Powell, 1933)

= Proxiuber =

Proxiuber Temporal range: Eocene–Recent

Genus of gastropods

Proxiuber is a genus of sea snails, marine gastropod molluscs in the family Naticidae, the moon shells. The genus is endemic to New Zealand, with fossils dating back to the early Eocene, found in primarily in New Zealand, with one fossil species in Australia.

== Description ==
Members of the genus have small, solid shells, open umbilicus, and almost no funicle. Protoconches are smooth, pauciscpiral and have a large nucleus, while the operculums are smooth, shelly and have two weak marginal grooves. The radula have a tricuspid central tooth. The protoconches have an flattened knob at the tip, while the funicle is either obsolete or close to being obsolete, and radula have tricuspid central marginals and bifid inner marginals.

== Taxonomy ==
The genus was first described by A. W. B. Powell in 1933. Powell named Lunatia australis (now Proxiuber australe) as the type species of the genus.

== Distribution ==
Proxiuber is endemic to New Zealand. Most fossil species date to the Pliocene and early Pleistocene of New Zealand, with the oldest known fossil species, Proxiuber platamodes, dating to the Waipawan stage of the early Eocene, c. 56 million years ago. One fossil species is known from Australia, P. microsculptum, dating to the Miocene of South Australia.

== Species ==
Species within the genus Proxiuber include:

- †Proxiuber anteaustrale A. W. B. Powell, 1938
- †Proxiuber astrictum Marwick, 1965
- Proxiuber australe (F. W. Hutton, 1878)
- Proxiuber hulmei A. W. B. Powell, 1954
- †Proxiuber kaawaense (Marwick, 1924)
- †Proxiuber microsculptum Ludbrook, 1958
- †Proxiuber platamodes F. J. Finlay & Marwick, 1937
