= Zebittium =

Scientific classification
- Kingdom: Animalia
- Phylum: Mollusca
- Class: Gastropoda
- Subclass: Caenogastropoda
- Order: incertae sedis
- Superfamily: Cerithioidea
- Family: Cerithiidae
- Subfamily: Bittiinae
- Genus: Zebittium; H. J. Finlay, 1926

Type species
- Cerithium exilis F. W. Hutton, 1873

Synonyms
- Bittium (Zebittium) Finlay, 1926

Genus of gastropod

Zebittium is a genus of sea snail, a marine gastropod mollusc or micromollusc in the family Cerithiidae, the cerithiids.

== Species ==
- † Zebittium brooksae (Stilwell, Zinsmeister & Oleinik, 2004)
- Zebittium editum A. W. B. Powell, 1930
- Zebittium exile (F. W. Hutton, 1873)
- Zebittium laevicordatum A. W. B. Powell, 1937
- † Zebittium tenuicordatum Laws, 1940
- † Zebittium vicinum Laws, 1941

Synonyms

- † Zebittium granchii (Stilwell & Zinsmeister, 1992): synonym of † Bittium granchii Stilwell & Zinsmeister, 1992
