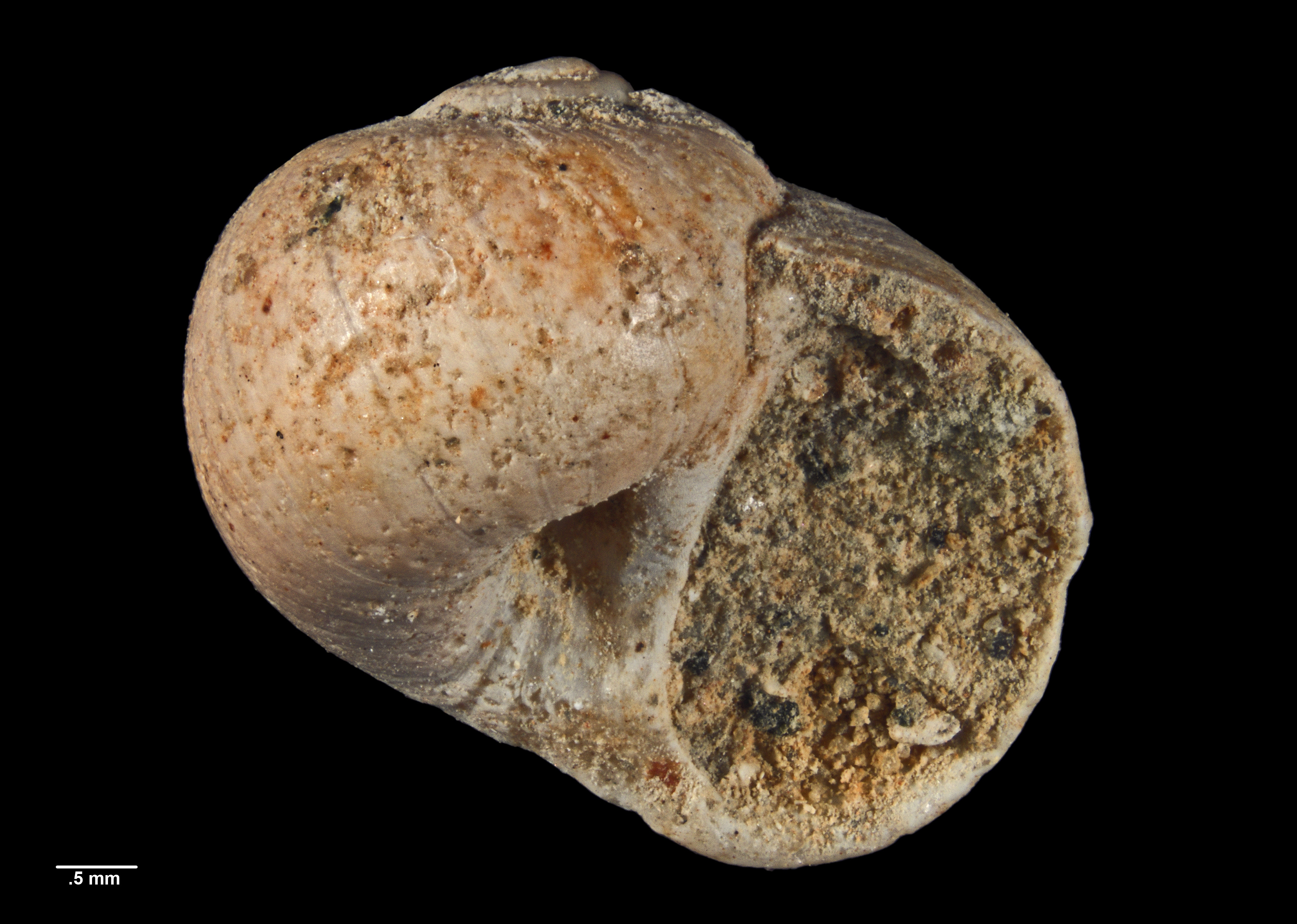
- Holotype from Auckland War Memorial Museum

Scientific classification
- Kingdom: Animalia
- Phylum: Mollusca
- Class: Gastropoda
- Subclass: Caenogastropoda
- Order: Littorinimorpha
- Family: Naticidae
- Genus: Proxiuber
- Species: †P. anteaustrale

Binomial name
- †Proxiuber anteaustrale A. W. B. Powell, 1938

Synonyms
- Proxiuber anteaustralis A. W. B. Powell, 1938

= Proxiuber anteaustrale =

Proxiuber anteaustrale Temporal range: 3.70–1.63 Ma

Extinct species of gastropod

Proxiuber anteaustrale is an extinct species of sea snail, a marine gastropod mollusc in the family Naticidae. Fossils of the species date to the early Pleistocene strata across New Zealand, including the Castlepoint Formation at Castlepoint, Wairarapa, New Zealand.

== Description ==
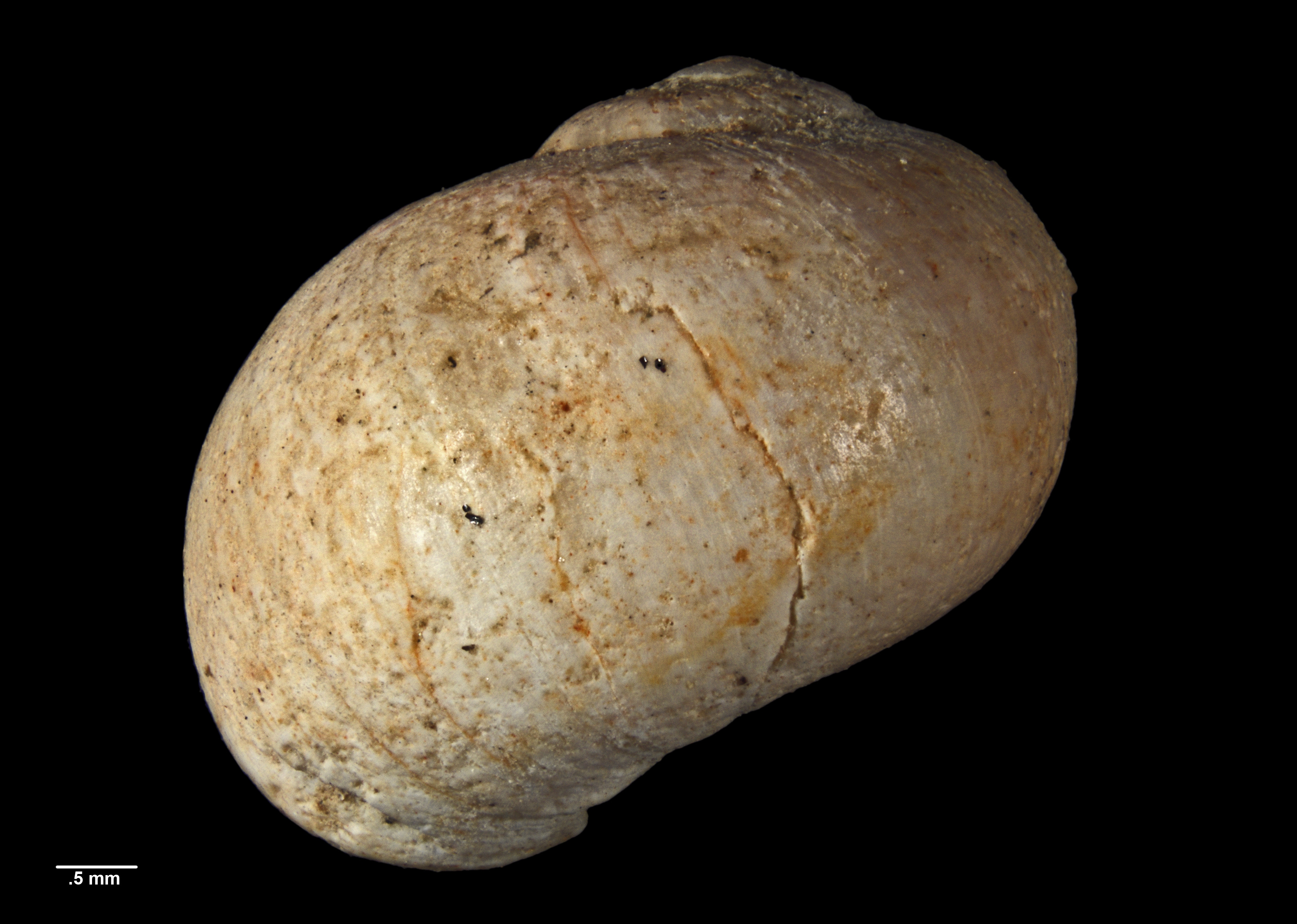
Reverse view of holotype

In the original description, Powell described the species as follows:

Shell small, broadly ovate; spire very little raised, about one-fifth height of aperture. Whorls 4, including smooth blunt protoconch of 1 1/2 whorls. Sutures well marked, abutting. Surface without sculpture except for indistinct axial growth lines. Outline of whorls strongly and evenly convex, but slightly flattened below suture. Aperture semilunar. Umbilicus widely open about one-sixth width of shell, funicle undeveloped, merely defined below by a groove. Inner lip callus thickened and slightly encroaching upon the umbilicus from above.

The holotype of the species has a height of 5.1 mm (0.20 in) and a diameter of 5.8 mm (0.23 in).

== Taxonomy ==
The species was first described by A.W.B. Powell in 1938, using the spelling Proxiuber anteaustralis. The holotype was collected by Powell in 1924 from the Lighthouse Reef, Castlepoint, Wairarapa, New Zealand, and is held by the Auckland War Memorial Museum.

== Distribution ==
This extinct marine species occurs in early Pleistocene (Nukumaruan stage) strata of New Zealand dating to c. 2.40 million years ago across New Zealand, including the Castlepoint Formation at Castlepoint, Wairarapa, New Zealand.
