= Zebittium laevicordatum =

Scientific classification
- Kingdom: Animalia
- Phylum: Mollusca
- Class: Gastropoda
- Subclass: Caenogastropoda
- Order: incertae sedis
- Family: Cerithiidae
- Genus: Zebittium
- Species: Z. editum

Binomial name
- Zebittium editum Powell, 1937

Synonyms
- Zebittium editum (Powell, 1930)

Species of gastropod

Zebittium laevicordatum is a species of small sea snail, a marine gastropod mollusc in the family Cerithiidae, the cerithiids. It is known to occur only at the Three Kings Islands of New Zealand.
