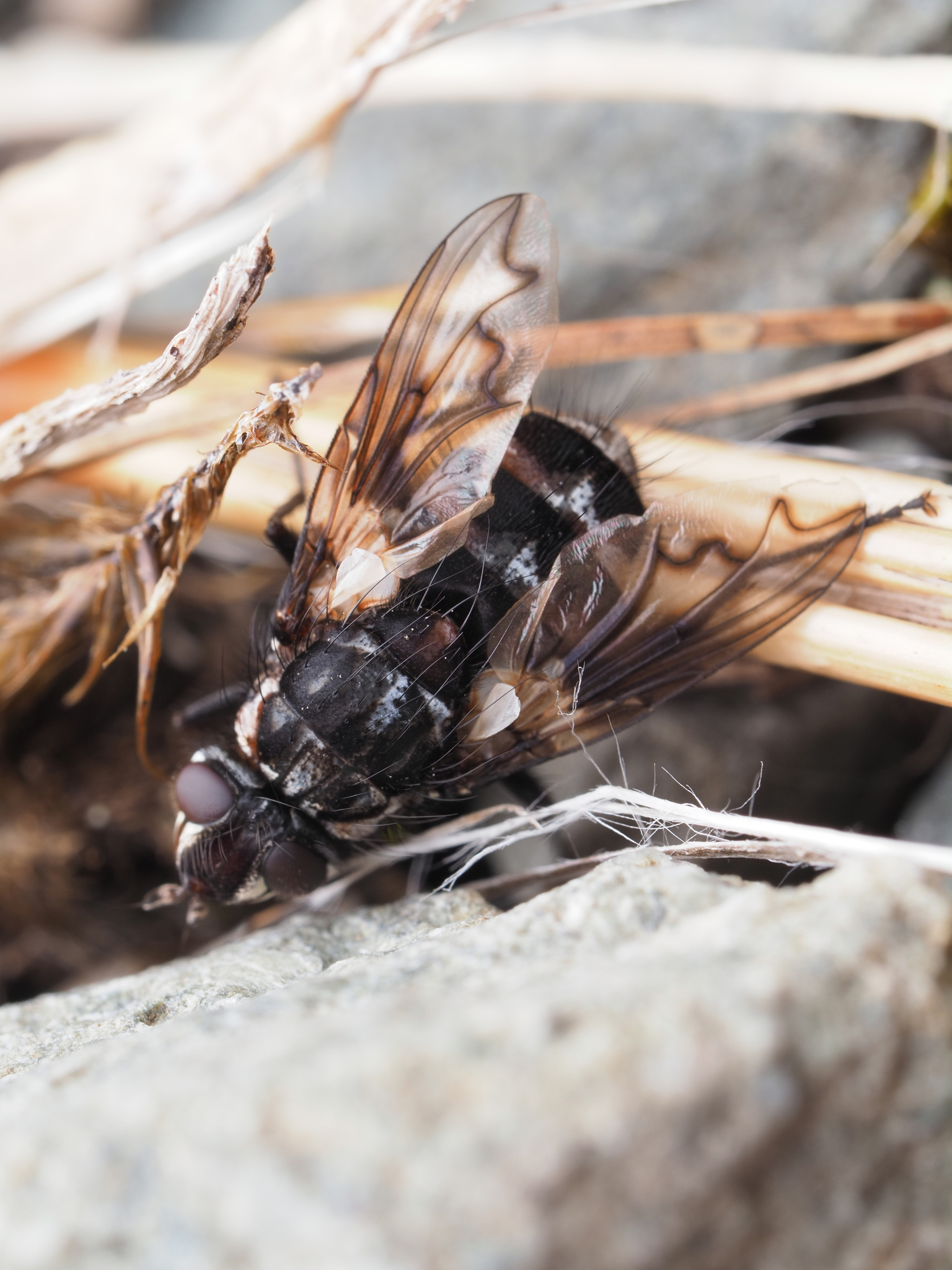
- Graphotachina sinuata seen in Arthur's Pass National Park

Scientific classification
- Kingdom: Animalia
- Phylum: Arthropoda
- Class: Insecta
- Order: Diptera
- Family: Tachinidae
- Subfamily: Tachininae
- Tribe: Proscissionini
- Genus: Graphotachina; Malloch, 1938

Type species
- Graphotachina sinuata Malloch, 1938

= Graphotachina =

Genus of flies

Graphotachina is a genus of flies in the family Tachinidae.

== Species ==
- Graphotachina sinuata Malloch, 1938

== Distribution ==
New Zealand.
