= Gracilicera =

Scientific classification
- Kingdom: Animalia
- Phylum: Arthropoda
- Class: Insecta
- Order: Diptera
- Family: Tachinidae
- Subfamily: Tachininae
- Tribe: Proscissionini
- Genus: Gracilicera; Miller, 1945

Type species
- Engycera politiventris Malloch, 1938

Synonyms
- Engycera Malloch, 1938

Genus of flies

Gracilicera is a genus of flies in the family Tachinidae.

== Species ==
- Gracilicera monticola (Malloch, 1938)
- Gracilicera pallipes (Malloch, 1938)
- Gracilicera politiventris (Malloch, 1938)

== Distribution ==
New Zealand.
