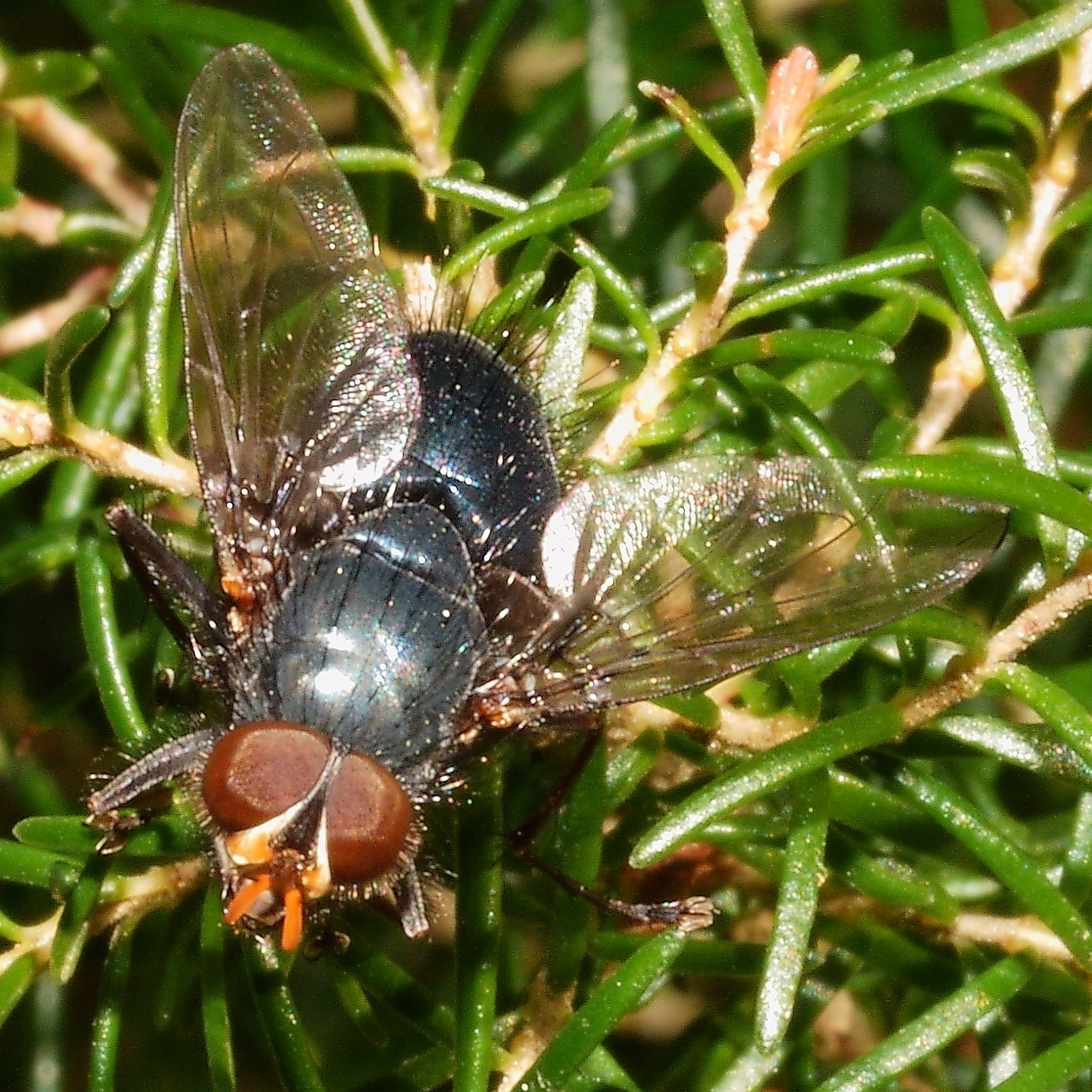
- Tachineo clarkii

Scientific classification
- Kingdom: Animalia
- Phylum: Arthropoda
- Clade: Pancrustacea
- Class: Insecta
- Order: Diptera
- Family: Tachinidae
- Subfamily: Tachininae
- Tribe: Proscissionini
- Genus: Tachineo; Malloch, 1938

Type species
- Tachina clarkii (Hutton, 1901)

= Tachineo =

Genus of flies

Tachineo is a monotypic genus of flies in the family Tachinidae. The sole known member is Tachineo clarkii (Hutton, 1901), which is endemic to New Zealand.
