= Veluta =

Scientific classification
- Kingdom: Animalia
- Phylum: Arthropoda
- Class: Insecta
- Order: Diptera
- Family: Tachinidae
- Subfamily: Tachininae
- Tribe: Proscissionini
- Genus: Veluta; Malloch, 1938

Type species
- Veluta albicincta Malloch, 1938

Genus of flies

Veluta is a monotypic genus of flies in the family Tachinidae. The sole member, Veluta albicincta, is endemic to New Zealand.
