= Neoerythronychia =

Scientific classification
- Kingdom: Animalia
- Phylum: Arthropoda
- Class: Insecta
- Order: Diptera
- Family: Tachinidae
- Subfamily: Tachininae
- Tribe: Proscissionini
- Genus: Neoerythronychia; Malloch, 1932

Type species
- Neoerythronychia hirta Malloch, 1932

Genus of flies

Neoerythronychia is a monotypic genus of flies in the family Tachinidae. The sole member, Neoerythronychia hirta, is endemic to New Zealand.
