= Coelotrochus polychromus =

Scientific classification
- Kingdom: Animalia
- Phylum: Mollusca
- Class: Gastropoda
- Subclass: Vetigastropoda
- Order: Trochida
- Family: Trochidae
- Genus: Coelotrochus
- Species: C. polychromus

Binomial name
- Coelotrochus polychromus (Marshall, 1998)

Synonyms
- Thoristella polychroma Marshall, 1998

Species of gastropod

Coelotrochus polychromus is a species of sea snail, a marine gastropod mollusk in the family Trochidae, the top snails.

== Description ==
The width of the shell attains 5.9 mm.

== Distribution ==
This marine species is endemic to New Zealand and occurs off Three Kings Islands.
