= Coelotrochus carinatus =

Scientific classification
- Kingdom: Animalia
- Phylum: Mollusca
- Class: Gastropoda
- Subclass: Vetigastropoda
- Order: Trochida
- Superfamily: Trochoidea
- Family: Trochidae
- Genus: Coelotrochus
- Species: C. carinatus

Binomial name
- Coelotrochus carinatus (B. A. Marshall, 1998)

Species of gastropod

Coelotrochus carinatus is a species of sea snail, a marine gastropod mollusk in the family Trochidae, the top snails.

== Description ==
The height of the shell attains 3.8 mm, its diameter 4.3 mm.

== Distribution ==
This marine species is endemic to New Zealand and occurs off Three Kings Islands.
