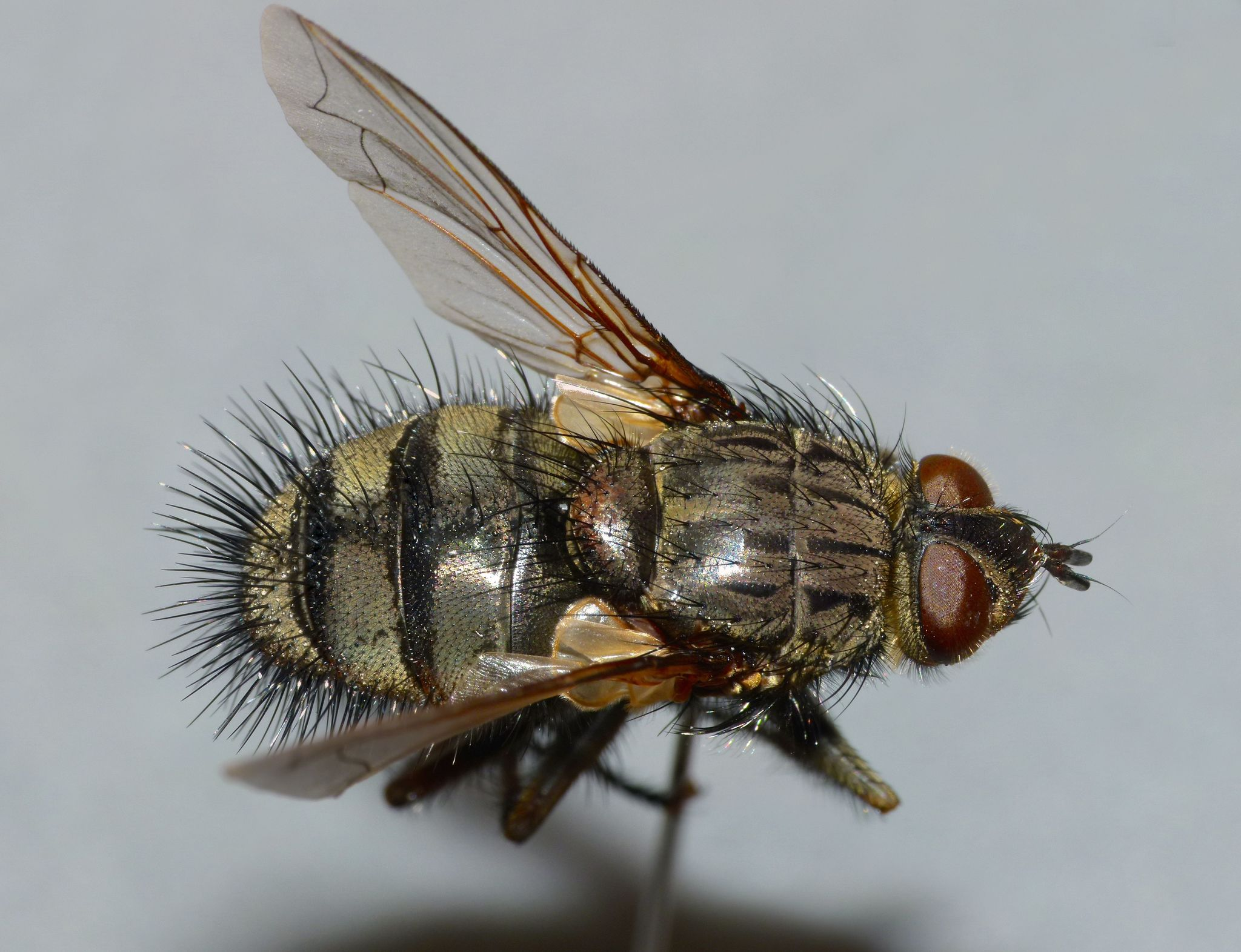

Scientific classification
- Kingdom: Animalia
- Phylum: Arthropoda
- Class: Insecta
- Order: Diptera
- Family: Tachinidae
- Subfamily: Tachininae
- Tribe: Proscissionini
- Genus: Bothrophora; Schiner, 1868
- Species: B. lupina

Binomial name
- Bothrophora lupina (Swederus, 1787)

Synonyms
- (Genus): Hystricina Malloch, 1932; (Species): Musca lupina Swederus, 1787; Bothrophora zelebori Schiner, 1868

= Bothrophora =

Bothrophora lupina

Genus of flies

Bothrophora is a genus of flies in the family Tachinidae. It is monotypic, being represented by the single species Bothrophora lupina which is found in New Zealand.
