= Zebittium editum =

Scientific classification
- Kingdom: Animalia
- Phylum: Mollusca
- Class: Gastropoda
- Subclass: Caenogastropoda
- Order: incertae sedis
- Family: Cerithiidae
- Genus: Zebittium
- Species: Z. editum

Binomial name
- Zebittium editum (Powell, 1930)

Synonyms
- Bittium editum Powell, 1930

Species of gastropod

Zebittium editum is a species of small sea snail, a marine gastropod mollusc in the family Cerithiidae, the cerithiids. This species is found only in New Zealand.

== Distribution ==
This marine species is endemic to New Zealand.
