= Avibrissina brevipalpis =

Scientific classification
- Kingdom: Animalia
- Phylum: Arthropoda
- Clade: Pancrustacea
- Class: Insecta
- Order: Diptera
- Family: Tachinidae
- Genus: Avibrissina
- Species: A. brevipalpis

Binomial name
- Avibrissina brevipalpis Malloch, 1932

Species of fly

Avibrissina brevipalpis is a species of fly in the family Tachinidae. It was first described by John Russell Malloch in 1932. It is endemic to New Zealand.
