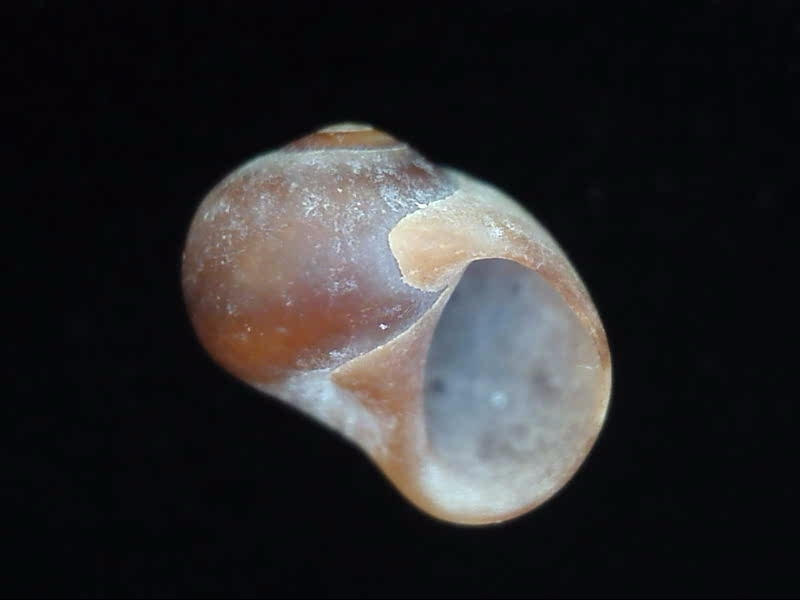

Scientific classification
- Kingdom: Animalia
- Phylum: Mollusca
- Class: Gastropoda
- Subclass: Caenogastropoda
- Order: Littorinimorpha
- Family: Naticidae
- Genus: Proxiuber
- Species: P. australe

Binomial name
- Proxiuber australe (Hutton, 1878)

Synonyms
- Lunatia australis Hutton, 1878; Natica maoria Finlay, 1924; Proxiuber australis [sic]

= Proxiuber australe =

Species of gastropod

Proxiuber australe is a species of sea snail, a marine gastropod mollusc in the family Naticidae, the moon snails or necklace shells.
