= Coelotrochus oppressus =

- Drawing of a shell of Coelotrochus oppressus

Scientific classification
- Kingdom: Animalia
- Phylum: Mollusca
- Class: Gastropoda
- Subclass: Vetigastropoda
- Order: Trochida
- Family: Trochidae
- Genus: Coelotrochus
- Species: C. oppressus

Binomial name
- Coelotrochus oppressus (Hutton, 1878)

Synonyms
- Gibbula oppressa Hutton, 1878 (original description); Thoristella oppressa (Hutton,1878); Trochus oppressus Hutton, 1878

Species of gastropod

Coelotrochus oppressus, common name the shouldered top shell, is a species of very small sea snail, a marine gastropod mollusc in the family Trochidae, the top snails or top shells.

== Description ==
The length of the shell attains 5.5 mm, its diameter 6 mm. The small, somewhat solid shell has a conical shape. It is lustreless, with a false umbilicus. The sculpture of the entire surface is closely finely spirally striate. The striae of the base become coarser toward the axis. The colour of the shell is dark olive-brown or greenish, minutely tessellated all over with a slightly darker shade of the same hue. The small protoconch is conical with two slightly spirally striated whorls. The teleoconch consists of five whorls, those of the spire keeled above the middle. The body whorl is biangular. The base of the shell is rather flattened. The suture is slightly impressed. The oblique aperture is subquadrangular, iridescent and slightly lirate within. The peristome is sharp and discontinuous. The outer and basal lip are convex, with a narrow opaque margin within, which is smooth. The oblique columella is straight, in adult specimens with a few inconspicuous plications above. The umbilicus is filled with callus, leaving only a slight pit.

== Distribution ==
This marine species is endemic to New Zealand and occurs off North Island.
