= James Mackay Drummond =

New Zealand journalist, naturalist and writer (1869–1940)

James Mackay Drummond (17 October 1869–6 September 1940) was a New Zealand journalist, naturalist and writer. He was born in Thames, Thames/Coromandel, New Zealand on 17 October 1869.
