= Chaetopletha =

Scientific classification
- Kingdom: Animalia
- Phylum: Arthropoda
- Class: Insecta
- Order: Diptera
- Family: Tachinidae
- Subfamily: Tachininae
- Tribe: Proscissionini
- Genus: Chaetopletha; Malloch, 1938

Type species
- Plethochaetigera centralis Malloch, 1938

Genus of flies

Chaetopletha is a monotypic genus of flies in the family Tachinidae. The sole member, Chaetopletha centralis, is endemic to New Zealand.

== Distribution ==
New Zealand.
