= Platytachina =

Scientific classification
- Kingdom: Animalia
- Phylum: Arthropoda
- Class: Insecta
- Order: Diptera
- Family: Tachinidae
- Subfamily: Tachininae
- Tribe: Proscissionini
- Genus: Platytachina; Malloch, 1938

Type species
- Platytachina major Malloch, 1938

Genus of flies

Platytachina is a genus of flies in the family Tachinidae.

== Species ==
- Platytachina angustifrons Malloch, 1938
- Platytachina atricornis Malloch, 1938
- Platytachina difficilis Malloch, 1938
- Platytachina latifrons Malloch, 1938
- Platytachina major Malloch, 1938

== Distribution ==
New Zealand.
