= Frederick Hutton (scientist) =

English–New Zealand scientist (1836–1905)

Frederick Hutton FRS FGS CMZS
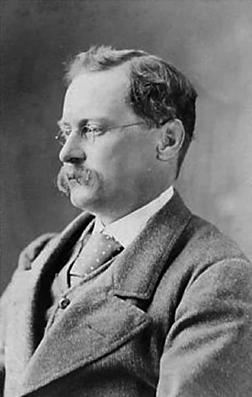
- Born: Frederick Wollaston Hutton; 16 November 1836; Gate Burton, Lincolnshire, England
- Died: 27 October 1905 (aged 68); Died at sea
- Resting place: Buried at sea off Cape Town, South Africa
- Awards: Indian Mutiny Medal, Relief of Lucknow and Lucknow clasps; Clarke Medal (1891)
- Scientific career
- Institutions: New Zealand Institute; Auckland Institute · Auckland Museum, Auckland (1867–1869); Colonial Museum, Wellington (1871–1873); Otago Institute · Otago Museum, Dunedin (1874–1879); Canterbury Museum, Christchurch (1887–1905)

Captain Frederick Wollaston Hutton FRS FGS (16 November 1836 – 27 October 1905) was an English-born New Zealand scientist who applied the theory of natural selection to explain the origins and nature of the natural history of New Zealand. Whilst an army officer, he embarked on an academic career in geology and biology, to become one of the most able and prolific nineteenth century naturalists of New Zealand.

== Early life ==
Frederick Hutton's biographical accounts assert that he was born at Gate Burton, Lincolnshire, on 16 November 1836, and by parish records was baptised there on 27 January 1837; the second son of the Rev. Henry Frederick Hutton and his wife Louisa Wollaston, daughter of the Rev. Henry John Wollaston. Paternal grandfather, William Hutton, was the owner of the Gate Burton estate. His signed military statement of services, however, records that he was born at Bracknell, Berkshire, England, on 16 November 1836.

He received his early education through Southwell Grammar School, Nottinghamshire, and, with a view to entering the Royal Navy, the Royal Naval Academy at Gosport, Hampshire. After brief service as a midshipman in Green's Merchant Service, with three voyages to India in the Alfred, he went on to civil engineer studies at the applied science department of King's College London in 1854–55.

== Career ==
=== Military ===
At the age of 18.5 years, Hutton purchased a commission as ensign in the 23rd (Royal Welsh Fusiliers) Regiment of Foot on 18 May 1855. Stationed at Malta, November 1855–8 March 1856, he moved on to take part in the Crimean War, 9 March–21 July 1856, and Indian Mutiny, 28 September 1857 – 22 May 1858. Following Crimea, and having advanced to rank of lieutenant by purchase on 27 March 1857, the regiment embarked for the war in China but as with other forces, was diverted at Singapore to Calcutta for the mutiny in India. Joining the army at Lucknow on 14 November, Hutton was present at the second relief of Lucknow, the defeat of the Gwalior Contingent in the second battle of Cawnpore and the retaking of Lucknow in March 1858, under the command of General Sir Colin Campbell. He was issued the Indian Mutiny Medal with two clasps—Relief of Lucknow, Lucknow.

Transferred to 2nd Battalion of his regiment on 22 May 1858, he returned home in June 1858 to help raise it. After passing, through the School of Musketry, Hythe, Kent, he was appointed Instructor of Musketry to his battalion on 2 November 1858, and accompanied his regiment to Malta.

Back in England in 1860, and having devoted some study to geology, Hutton was elected a Fellow of the Geological Society of London (FGS). Over the next few years he completed military training at Staff College, Sandhurst, and Woolwich. He'd also taken a six month chemistry course in inorganic analysis with Professor George Downing Liveing, Cambridge, then teaching at Sandhurst.

In 1862, he was attached first to the Royal Horse Artillery and thereafter to the 9th Lancers. Following elevation to rank of captain by purchase on 2 December 1862, he married Annie Gouger Montgomerie, at Holy Trinity, Paddington, London, on 4 February 1863. He re-joined his regiment at Malta but was appointed to the staff of Ireland from 11 September 1863, as Brigade Major, 2nd Infantry Brigade, at the Curragh. That year he published the paper, The Importance of a Knowledge of Geology to Military Men, in the Journal of the Royal United Service Institution. After some nine months at the Curragh, Hutton moved to head quarters in Dublin as Deputy Assistant Quarter Master General from 1 July 1864, then, in November 1865, resigned and sold out of the army.

During those years he had "geologised, more or less, in the British Isles, parts of Germany, France, Italy, Sicily, Crimea, Gibraltar, and Switzerland in Europe; Madeira, St. Vincent (one of the C de Verde Isls) and Cape Colony in Africa; and in some parts of the Province of Bengal as far north as Lucknow and Futteghur". His latest work on Malta, "Sketch of the Physical Geology of the Maltese Islands", was published by The Geological Magazine in April 1866, following his service.

=== Scientific ===
The Huttons—Frederick, Annie, their children Alice and Gilbert, and two servants—left Gravesend, on the clipper Queen of the North, on 17 January 1866, bound for new opportunities in New Zealand. After a tedious voyage, passing Tristan da Cunha, Cape of Good Hope, Île Saint-Paul, South Cape of Tasmania, Three Kings and North Cape of New Zealand, the clipper came to anchor off Queen Street wharf, Auckland, on Monday, 11 June.

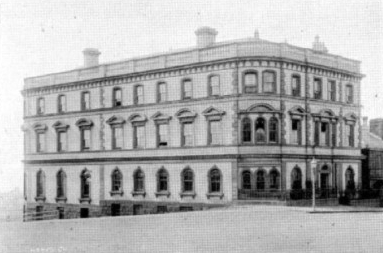
Auckland Museum occupied the basement of the Provincial Government offices from 1867 to 1869; The Northern Club from 1869

In May 1867, Captain Hutton volunteered to take charge of Auckland Museum, articles of which had been suffering in its Grafton Road cottage, and sought to put the institution in good order with its relocation to the very large basement room of the new Provincial Government offices on the corner of Princes Street and Victoria Quadrant—The Northern Club building. Accepted as Honorary Curator by the Superintendent of Auckland Province, John Williamson, he worked his way through arranging and classifying the confused and inconsistently recorded collections. Additionally, he prepared exhibition of the objects, received further specimens, artefacts etc. and worked towards establishing a museum library. Hutton and Thomas Gillies initiated the inaugural public meeting of 6 November 1867, held in the Board Room of the Auckland Board of Commissioners, to establish the Auckland Philosophical Society; soon renamed Auckland Institute. The meeting was called immediately following a conversation they'd had in relation to the action taken by the General Assembly of New Zealand in constituting the New Zealand Institute. James Hector, manager of the Institute in Wellington, had recently suggested to Gillies the propriety of establishing branches throughout New Zealand, especially in Auckland. Auckland Institute was formally incorporated with the New Zealand Institute on 10 June 1868. Auckland Museum was transferred to the Auckland Institute in October 1869.

In 1867 he was employed by the Superintendent of Auckland to carry out a geological survey of the lower Waikato. On 8 June 1869, he reported the discovery of substantial coalfields between the Maramarua and Whangamarino rivers, which another settler intended to work for his flax mill. Later in 1869, Hutton and family sold their Epsom home in Auckland and moved to the Waikato, where he'd erected a steam-powered flax mill at Churchill, a station on the western bank of the Waikato River, near Whangape Stream. Hutton's venture, however, proved uneconomic and in consequence his flax mill with 500 acres of flax land, along with a farm of 2,000 acres situated on Lake Whangape, were put up for sale in March 1872.

He'd joined the Geological Survey of New Zealand in 1866, becoming Provincial Geologist of Otago in 1874. At the same time, he was made lecturer in geology at the University of Otago and curator of the museum there. After the 1886 eruption of Mount Tarawera he wrote one of the official reports and postulated the eruption was due to moltern material reaching the surface in a volcanic dyke. Hutton became professor of biology at Canterbury College in 1880, and was elected a Fellow of the Royal Society in 1892. The following year, he also took on the curatorship of the Canterbury Museum. Towards the end of his life, Hutton was made president of the Royal Australasian Ornithologists Union. He was awarded the Clarke Medal by the Royal Society of New South Wales in 1891. He was the first President of the New Zealand Institute (which later became the Royal Society of New Zealand), from 1904 to his death in 1905; he was followed by Sir James Hector. He was one of the inaugural vice-chairmen of the New Zealand Alpine Club, which was founded in July 1891.

He worked successively at the Colonial Museum, Wellington (1871–1873) (now called Te Papa Tongarewa Museum of New Zealand); Otago Museum, Dunedin (1874–1879); and the Canterbury Museum, Christchurch (1887–1905).

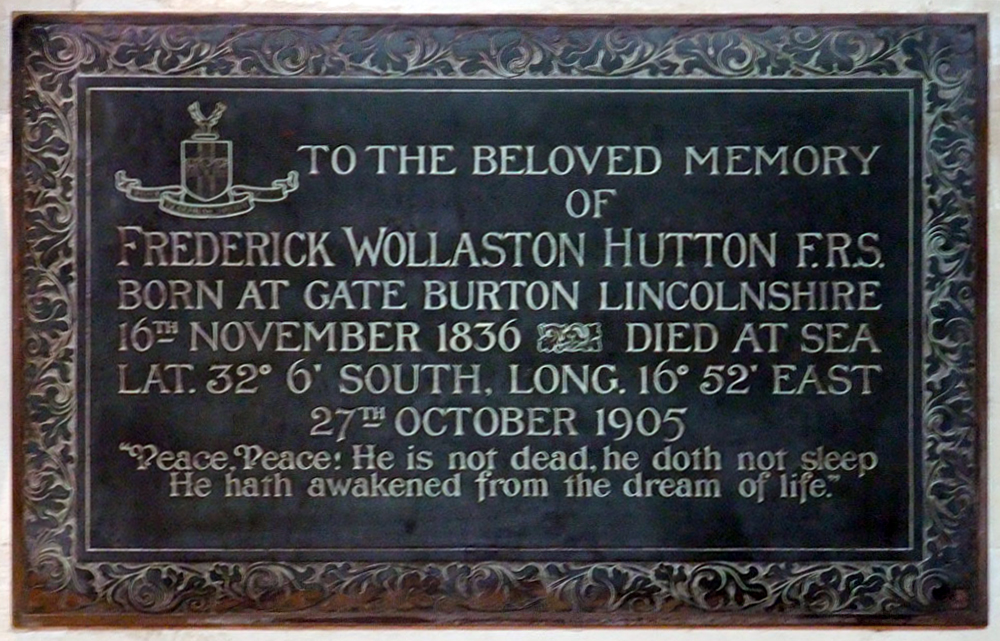
Plaque to Hutton in ChristChurch Cathedral

Hutton died on the return voyage on the SS Rimutaka from England on 27 October 1905, and was buried at sea off Cape Town, South Africa.

He is commemorated in the Hutton Medal and Hutton Memorial Fund, awarded for scientific works bearing on the zoology, botany or geology of New Zealand. Hutton's shearwater (Puffinus huttoni), a sea bird, was named after him and the cave wētā Neonetus huttoni.

== Evolution ==
In 1860, he wrote a supportive review of Charles Darwin's On the Origin of Species for the journal, The Geologist. In 1861, he wrote an article defending Darwinism in the same journal. Hutton defended Darwin from the objections of creationist Adam Sedgwick, which he described as "gross ironical misrepresentations". He wrote that creationism was a "mere assertion, an evasion of the question, a cloak for ignorance."

Throughout his life, Hutton remained a staunch exponent of Darwin's theories of natural selection, and Darwin himself expressed his appreciation in a letter to Hutton.

== Taxa ==
Taxa described and named by Hutton include:

- Cabalus modestus (Hutton, 1872) – the Chatham rail
- Callochiton empleurus (Hutton, 1872) – a chiton
- Ericentrus rubrus (Hutton, 1872) – the orange clinid
- Phosichthys argenteus Hutton, 1872 – a lightfish
- Stegnaster inflatus (Hutton, 1872) – a sea star
- Bittium exile (Hutton, 1873) – a marine snail
- Colistium guntheri (Hutton, 1873) – the New Zealand brill
- Comitas trailli (Hutton, 1873) – a marine snail
- Dentalium nanum Hutton, 1873
- Herpetopoma bella (Hutton, 1873) – a marine snail
- Leptonotus elevatus high-body pipefish Leptonotus elevatus (F. W. Hutton, 1872)
- Margarella antipoda rosea (Hutton, 1873) – a subspecies of marine snail
- Margarella fulminata (Hutton, 1873) – a marine snail
- Novastoa lamellosa (Hutton, 1873) – a marine snail
- Pterotyphis eos (Hutton, 1873) – a marine snail
- Pterotyphis zealandicus (Hutton, 1873) – a marine snail
- Pupa kirki (Hutton, 1873) – a marine snail
- Rhombosolea retiaria Hutton, 1873 – the black flounder
- Scorpis violacea (Hutton, 1873) – the blue maomao
- Thoristella chathamensis (Hutton, 1873) – a marine snail
- Trichosirius inornatus (Hutton, 1873) – a marine snail
- Uberella vitrea (Hutton, 1873) – a marine snail
- Xymene plebeius (Hutton, 1873) – a marine snail
- Xymene traversi (Hutton, 1873) – a marine snail
- Zeacolpus symmetricus (Hutton, 1873) – a marine snail
- Zeacolpus vittatus (Hutton, 1873) – a marine snail
- Jasus edwardsii (Hutton, 1875) – a spiny lobster
- Paratrachichthys trailli (Hutton, 1875) – the sandpaper fish or common roughy
- Bidenichthys consobrinus (Hutton, 1876) – the grey brotula or orange cuskeel
- Anomia trigonopsis Hutton, 1877 – a marine bivalve
- Notolabrus cinctus (Hutton, 1877) – the girdled wrasse
- Eudyptes filholi Hutton, 1879 – the eastern rockhopper penguin
- Leuconopsis obsoleta (Hutton, 1878) – a land snail
- Proxiuber australe (Hutton, 1878) – a marine snail
- Proxiuber hulmei (Hutton, 1878) – a marine snail
- Thoristella oppressa (Hutton, 1878) – a land snail
- Gallirallus philippensis macquariensis (Hutton, 1879) – the Macquarie Island rail
- Pseudaneitea papillata (Hutton, 1879) – a slug
- Patelloida corticata (Hutton, 1880) – a limpet
- Latiidae Hutton, 1882 – a family of freshwater molluscs
- Cytora calva (Hutton, 1883) – a land snail
- Cytora pallida (Hutton, 1883) – a land snail
- Cytora pannosa (Hutton, 1883) – a land snail
- Homalopoma fluctuata (Hutton, 1883) – a marine snail
- Lamellaria cerebroides Hutton, 1883 – a marine snail
- Rhytida australis Hutton, 1883 – a land snail
- Rhytida citrina Hutton, 1883 – a land snail
- Rhytida patula Hutton, 1883 – a land snail
- Fossarina rimata (Hutton, 1884) – a marine snail
- Micrelenchus caelatus (Hutton, 1884) – a marine snail
- Otoconcha Hutton, 1884 – a land snail genus
- Leuconopsis Hutton, 1884 – a land snail genus
- Microvoluta marginata (Hutton, 1885) – a marine snail
- Powelliphanta lignaria (Hutton, 1888) – a land snail
- Argosarchus Hutton, 1898 – a stick insect genus
- Hemideina ricta (Hutton, 1896) – a tree weta
- Isoplectron armatus (Hutton, 1896) – a cave wētā
- Paprides armillaus (Hutton, 1897) – an alpine grasshopper
- Paprides australis (Hutton, 1897) – an alpine grasshopper
- Paprides torquatus (Hutton, 1897) – an alpine grasshopper
- Exsul singularis Hutton, 1901 – an alpine fly
- Marshall, Bruce A. (1995). "Molluscan and Brachiopod Taxa Introduced by F. W. Hutton in The New Zealand Journal of Science". Journal of the Royal Society of New Zealand. 25 (4): 495–500. Bibcode:1995JRSNZ..25..495M. doi:10.1080/03014223.1995.9517499.
- Russell, Barry C. (1996). "Type Specimens of New Zealand Fishes Described by Captain F.W. Hutton, F.R.S. (1836–1905)". Journal of the Royal Society of New Zealand. 26 (2): 215–236. Bibcode:1996JRSNZ..26..215R. doi:10.1080/03014223.1996.9517511.
- Brook, Fred J.; Kennedy, Martyn; King, Tania M.; Ridden, Johnathon; Shaw, Matthew D.; Spencer, Hamish G. (2020). "Catalogue of New Zealand land, freshwater and estuarine molluscan taxa named by Frederick Wollaston Hutton between 1879 and 1904". Zootaxa. 4865 (1). Auckland: Magnolia Press: 1–73. doi:10.11646/zootaxa.4865.1.1. ISBN 978-1-77688-071-3. PMID 33311199. S2CID 226352941.

== Publications ==
- Hutton, Frederick Wollaston (1860). "Notes and Queries: Heterostegina-bed". The Geologist; A Popular Illustrated Monthly Magazine of Geology. 3. London: "Geologist" Office: 137.
- Hutton, Frederick Wollaston (1860). "Notes and Queries: Fossiliferous Localities in Malta". The Geologist; A Popular Illustrated Monthly Magazine of Geology. 3: 275–276.
- Hutton, Frederick Wollaston (1861). "Some Remarks on Mr Darwin's Theory". The Geologist; A Popular Illustrated Monthly Magazine of Geology. 4. London: "Geologist" Office: 132–136, 183–188 – via BHL.
- Hutton, Frederick Wollaston (1863). "The Importance of a Knowledge of Geology to Military Men". Journal of the Royal United Service Institution. 6 (24). London: W. Mitchell and Son: 342–360. doi:10.1080/03071846209418194.
- Hutton, Frederick Wollaston (1866). "I. Sketch of the Physical Geology of the Maltese Islands". The Geological Magazine. 3 (22–April): 145–151. doi:10.1017/S0016756800162545. S2CID 128974700. Accompanied by Plates VIII and IX, Figures 1–9.
- Hutton, Frederick Wollaston (1867), "Geological Report on the Lower Waikato District", Appendix to the Journals of the House of Representatives, 1867 Session I, D-05, Wellington
- Hutton, Frederick Wollaston (1869), "Report of the Discovery of a Coal Field Between the Thames and Waikato, Province of Auckland", Appendix to the Journals of the House of Representatives, 1869 Session I, D-01, Wellington
- Hutton, Frederick Wollaston (1871), "Papers Relative to the Defence of the Harbours of New Zealand", Appendix to the Journals of the House of Representatives, 1871 Session I, A-04, Wellington
- Hutton, Frederick Wollaston (1871). Catalogue of the Birds of New Zealand with Diagnoses of the Species. Wellington: Geological Survey of New Zealand – via BHL.
- Hutton, Frederick Wollaston (1872). Fishes of New Zealand, Catalogue with Diagnoses of the Species. Wellington: Colonial Museum and Geological Survey Department – via BHL. Includes Notes on the Edible Fishes of New Zealand by James Hector.
- Hutton, Frederick Wollaston (1873). Catalogue of the Marine Mollusca of New Zealand, with Diagnoses of the Species. Wellington: Colonial Museum and Geological Survey Department – via BHL.
- Hutton, Frederick Wollaston (1873). Catalogue of the Tertiary Mollusca and Echinodermata of New Zealand, in the Collection of the Colonial Museum. Wellington: Colonial Museum and Geological Survey Department – via BHL.
- Hutton, Frederick Wollaston; Ulrich, George Henry Frederick (1875). Report on the Geology & Gold Fields of Otago. Vol. 1. Dunedin: Provincial Council of Otago – via BHL. With appendices by J. G. Black and James McKerrow.
- Hutton, Frederick Wollaston (1880). Manual of the New Zealand Mollusca. A Systematic and Descriptive Catalogue of the Marine and Land Shells, and of the Soft Mollusks and Polyzoa of New Zealand and the Adjacent Islands. Wellington: Colonial Museum and Geological Survey Department – via BHL.
- Hutton, Frederick Wollaston (1881). Catalogues of the New Zealand Diptera, Orthoptera, Hymenoptera; with Descriptions of the Species. Wellington: Colonial Museum and Geological Survey Department – via BHL.
- Hutton, Frederick Wollaston (February 1887). "The Eruption of Mount Tarawera". Quarterly Journal of the Geological Society. 43 (1–4): 178–189. doi:10.1144/gsl.jgs.1887.043.01-04.16. S2CID 128945495.
- Hutton, Frederick Wollaston (1887). Report on the Tarawera Volcanic District. Wellington, New Zealand: Government Printer.
- Hutton, Frederick Wollaston (1887). Darwinism: A Lecture at the Philosophical Institute of Canterbury, September 12, 1887. Christchurch: The "Press" Job Printing Office.
- Hutton, Frederick Wollaston (1896). "Theoretical Explanations of the Distribution of Southern Faunas". Proceedings of the Linnean Society of New South Wales. 21: 36–47. doi:10.5962/bhl.part.8459.
- Hutton, Frederick Wollaston (1899). Darwinism and Lamarckism: Old and New. Four Lectures. New York, London: G. P. Putnam's Sons – via BHL.
- Hutton, Frederick Wollaston (1902). The Lesson of Evolution (1 ed.). London: Duckworth and Co. – via BHL.
- Hutton, Frederick Wollaston; Drummond, James (1902). Nature in New Zealand. Christchurch: Whitcombe and Tombs Limited.
- Hutton, Frederick Wollaston (1904). Index Faunæ Novæ Zealandiæ. London: Dulau & Co. – via BHL. A complete list of all animals recorded in New Zealand.
- Hutton, Frederick Wollaston; Drummond, James (1904). The Animals of New Zealand; An Account of the Dominion's Air-breathing Vertebrates (1 ed.). Christchurch: Whitcombe and Tombs Limited. A popular edition.
- Hutton, Frederick Wollaston; Drummond, James (1905). The Animals of New Zealand; An Account of the Dominion's Air-breathing Vertebrates (2 ed.). Christchurch: Whitcombe and Tombs Limited. A revised and enlarged edition.
- Hutton, Frederick Wollaston (1904). "Art. L—The Formation of the Canterbury Plains". Transactions and Proceedings of the Royal Society of New Zealand. 37. Wellington: John McKay, Government Printing Office: 465–472.
- Hutton, Frederick Wollaston (1904). "Art. LII.—Revision of the Tertiary Brachiopoda of New Zealand". Transactions and Proceedings of the Royal Society of New Zealand. 37. Wellington: John McKay, Government Printing Office: 474–481.
- Hutton, Frederick Wollaston (1905). "Ancient Antarctica". Nature. 72 (1863): 244–245. Bibcode:1905Natur..72..244H. doi:10.1038/072244d0. S2CID 4036004.
- Hutton, Frederick Wollaston (1906). Jacks, L. P.; Hicks, George Dawes (eds.). "What is Life?". The Hibbert Journal: A Quarterly Review of Religion, Theology, and Philosophy. 4 (October 1905–July 1906). London: Williams and Norgate: 183–186.
- Hutton, Frederick Wollaston (1907). The Lesson of Evolution (2 ed.). Christchurch: Printed for private circulation – via BHL.
- Hutton, Frederick Wollaston; Drummond, James (1909). The Animals of New Zealand; An Account of the Dominion's Air-breathing Vertebrates (3 ed.). Christchurch, Wellington, Auckland: Whitcombe and Tombs Limited – via BHL.

== Family ==
Hutton married Annie Gouger Montgomerie, daughter of William Montgomerie and his wife Elizabeth Graham, at Trinity Church, Paddington, London, on 4 February 1863; William had been Superintending Surgeon of the HEIC Bengal Medical Service, and had received the Gold Medal of the Society of Arts for introducing gutta percha into Europe as a general utility. Their children included Gilbert Montgomerie Hutton (1865–1911) of the Royal Engineers.

== Arms of Frederick Wollaston Hutton ==
Armorial bearings—Or, on a fesse sable, surmounted by a pale invected of the last, pierced of the field, three stags' heads caboshed counterchanged. Mantling sable and or. Crest—On a wreath of the colours, in front of a fern-brake proper, a stag's head caboshed or. Motto—Post tenebras spero lucem (After darkness, I hope for light)

Crest—A stag's head caboshed or. Motto—Post tenebras spero lucem (After darkness, I hope for light).

Awards
Preceded by George Bennett	Clarke Medal; 1891	Succeeded by William Turner Thiselton-Dyer
