= List of non-marine molluscs of New Zealand =

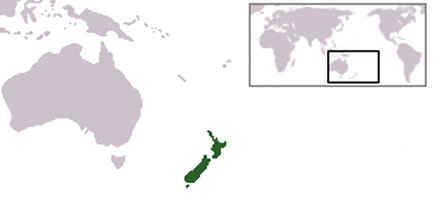
Location of New Zealand

Non-marine molluscs of New Zealand include gastropods, such as land snails, and freshwater molluscs (or shellfish), such as freshwater mussels. Among the best known are the large native forest snails such as the Paryphanta (kauri snails) and Powelliphanta.

== Systematic list ==
=== Freshwater gastropods ===
Tateidae

- Catapyrgus jami Verhaegen & Haase, 2021
- Catapyrgus sororius Haase, 2008
- Obtusopyrgus farri Verhaegen & Haase, 2021
- Opacuincola gretathunbergae Verhaegen & Haase, 2021
- Opacuincola lisannea Verhaegen & Haase, 2021
- Opacuincola mete Haase, 2008 with the subspecies O. mete kahurangi Verhaegen & Haase, 2021

Latiidae - only one genus Latia is endemic to the North Island

- Latia climoi Starobogatov, 1986 - type species
- Latia lateralis (Gould, 1852)
- Latia neritoides Gray, 1850

Lymnaeidae

Planorbidae

- Planorbis kahuica Finlay & Laws, 1931

=== Land gastropods ===
Hydrocenidae

- Omphalorissa purchasi (Pfeiffer, 1862)

Orthalicidae

- Placostylus ambagiosus Suter, 1906

Pupinidae

- Cytora annectens (Powell, 1948)
- Cytora aranea (Powell, 1928)
- Cytora brooki Marshall & Barker, 2007
- Cytora calva (Hutton, 1882)
- Cytora chiltoni (Suter, 1896)
- Cytora climoi Marshall & Barker, 2007
- Cytora cytora (Gray, 1850)
- Cytora depressa N. Gardner, 1968
- Cytora fasciata (Suter, 1894)
- Cytora filicosta (Powell, 1948)
- Cytora gardneri Marshall & Barker, 2007
- Cytora goulstonei Marshall & Barker, 2007
- Cytora hazelwoodi Marshall & Barker, 2007
- Cytora hedleyi (Suter, 1894)
- Cytora hirsutissima (Powell, 1951)
- Cytora hispida N. Gardner, 1967
- Cytora houhora Marshall & Barker, 2007
- Cytora jamiesoni Marshall & Barker, 2007
- Cytora kahurangi Marshall & Barker, 2007
- Cytora kakano Marshall & Barker, 2007
- Cytora kamura Marshall & Barker, 2007
- Cytora kerrana N. Gardner, 1968
- Cytora lignaria (L. Pfeiffer, 1857)
- Cytora malleata Marshall & Barker, 2007
- Cytora maui Marshall & Barker, 2007
- Cytora mayhillae Marshall & Barker, 2007
- Cytora minor Marshall & Barker, 2007
- Cytora motu Marshall & Barker, 2007
- Cytora pakotai Marshall & Barker, 2007
- Cytora pallida (Hutton, 1883)
- Cytora pannosa (Hutton, 1882)
- Cytora paparoa Marshall & Barker, 2007
- Cytora parrishi Marshall & Barker, 2007
- Cytora rakiura Marshall & Barker, 2007
- Cytora septentrionalis (Suter, 1907)
- Cytora solitaria (Powell, 1935)
- Cytora taipa Marshall & Barker, 2007
- Cytora tawhiti Marshall & Barker, 2007
- Cytora tepakiensis N. Gardner, 1967
- Cytora tokerau Marshall & Barker, 2007
- Cytora torquillum (Suter, 1894)
- Cytora tuarua Marshall & Barker, 2007
- Liarea aupouria Powell, 1954: Liarea aupouria aupouria and Liarea aupouria tara
- Liarea bicarinata (Suter, 1907)
- Liarea egea (Gray, 1850): Liarea egea egea and Liarea egea tessellata
- Liarea hochstetteri (Pfeiffer, 1861): Liarea hochstetteri alta, Liarea hochstetteri carinella and Liarea hochstetteri hochstetteri
- Liarea lepida (Suter, 1904)
- Liarea ornata Powell, 1954
- Liarea turriculata (Pfeiffer, 1855): Liarea turriculata partula, Liarea turriculata turriculata and Liarea turriculata waipoua

Punctidae

- Laoma leimonias (Gray, 1850)
- Paralaoma servilis (Shuttleworth, 1852)
- Phrixgnathus celia Hutton, 1883

Rhytididae

- Paryphanta busbyi (Gray, 1840)
- Paryphanta watti Powell, 1946
- Powelliphanta spp. - all species of the genus Powelliphanta are endemic to New Zealand
- Rhytida spp. - all species of the genus Rhytida are endemic to New Zealand
- Rhytida greenwoodi (Gray, 1850)
- Schizoglossa spp. - all species of the genus Schizoglossa are endemic to New Zealand
- Wainuia spp. - all species of the genus Wainuia are endemic to New Zealand

Charopidae

- Allodiscus dimorphus (Reeve, 1852)
- Alsolemia longstaffae (Suter, 1913)
- Charopa coma (Gray, 1843)
- Fectola infecta (Reeve, 1852)
- Flammulina zebra (Le Guillou, 1842)
- Mitodon wairarapa (Suter, 1890)
- Mocella eta (Pfeiffer, 1853)
- Neophenacohelix giveni (Cumber, 1961)
- Otoconcha dimidiata (L. Pfeiffer, 1853)
- Phacussa helmsi (Hutton, 1882)
- Phenacohelix pilula (Reeve, 1852)
- Ranfurlya constanceae Suter, 1903
- Suteria ide (Gray, 1850)
- Therasia thaisa Hutton, 1883

Helicidae

- Cornu aspersum (O.F. Müller, 1774)

=== Bivalvia ===
Hyriidae

- Cucumerunio websteri (Simpson, 1902)

== See also ==
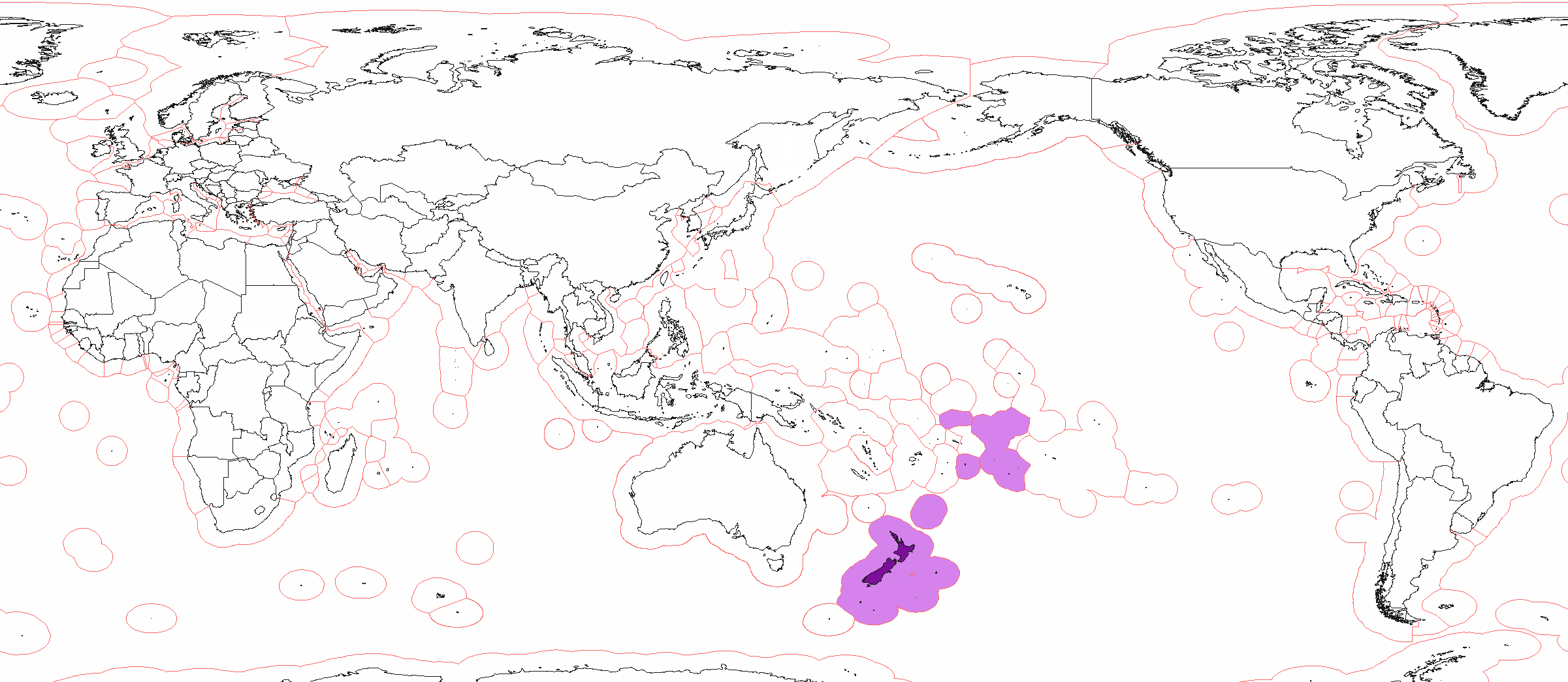
The Exclusive Economic Zone of the Realm of New Zealand

- List of marine molluscs of New Zealand
- List of non-marine molluscs of Australia
- Fauna of New Zealand
