= Latia-luciferin monooxygenase (demethylating) =

Identifiers
- EC no.: 1.14.99.21
- CAS no.: 62213-54-1

Databases
- BRENDA: enzyme data
- ExPASy: NiceZyme view
- KEGG: enzyme entry
- MetaCyc: metabolic pathway
- Rhea: reactions
- PDB structures: RCSB PDB PDBe PDBsum
- Gene Ontology: AmiGO / QuickGO
Search
- PMC: articles
- PubMed: articles
- NCBI: proteins

Latia-luciferin monooxygenase (demethylating) (EC 1.14.99.21) is an enzyme that catalyzes the chemical reaction

latia luciferin
2 O_{2}
CO_{2}
dihydro-β-ionone
+ hν + HCO_{2}H + H_{2}O

The reaction is an oxidation using molecular oxygen to cleave the formate ester of a luciferin found in the limpet Latia neritoides. The enzyme requires a reduced electron acceptor: light is emitted and carbon dioxide, water, and formic acid are produced as by-products.

This flavoprotein is an oxidoreductase with systematic name Latia-luciferin,hydrogen-donor:oxygen oxidoreductase (demethylating). Other names in common use include luciferase (Latia luciferin), and Latia luciferin monooxygenase (demethylating).
