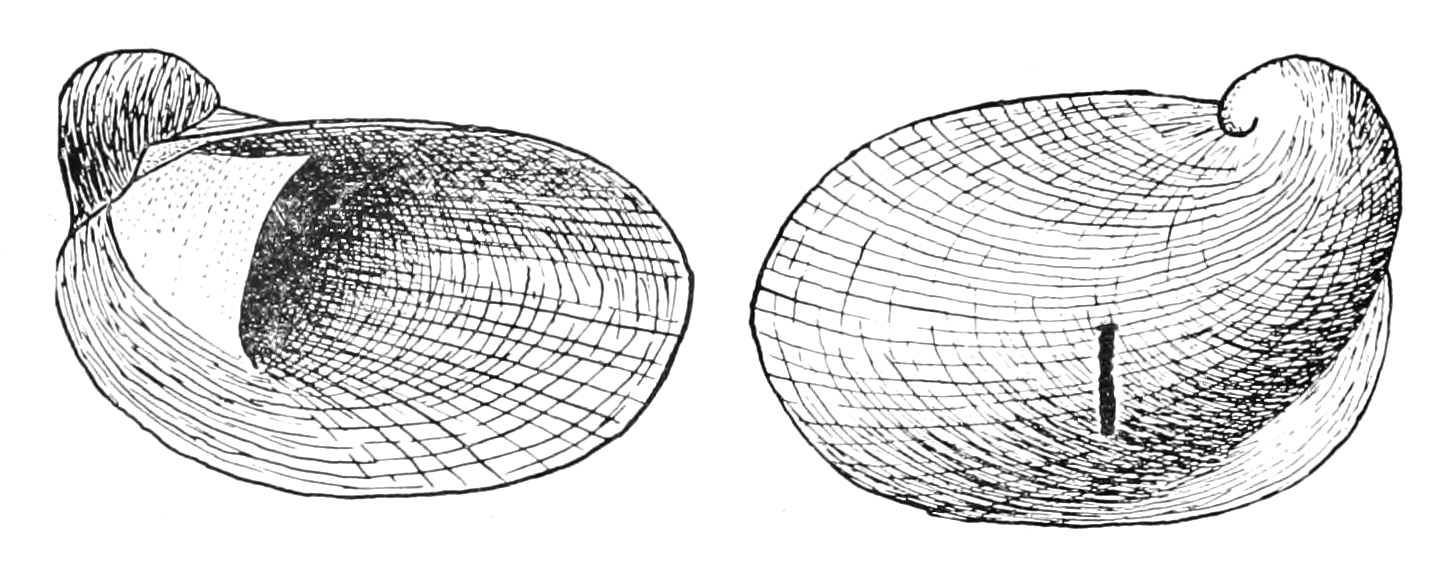
- shells of Amphigyra alabamensis

Scientific classification
- Kingdom: Animalia
- Phylum: Mollusca
- Class: Gastropoda
- Superorder: Hygrophila
- Family: Planorbidae
- Genus: Amphigyra; Pilsbry, 1906

= Amphigyra =

Genus of gastropods

Amphigyra is a genus of air-breathing freshwater snail, an aquatic pulmonate gastropod mollusk in the family Planorbidae, the ram's horn snails.

== Species ==
The genus Amphigyra contains the following species:

- shoal sprite (Amphigyra alabamensis) - type species

== Original description ==
Genus Amphigyra was originally described by Henry Augustus Pilsbry in 1906.

Pilsbry's original text (the original description) reads as follows:

Genus AMPHIGYRA nov.

The shell is minute, Neritoid or Crepidula-like, with a small depressed lateral spire, apparently dextral, composed of about 1
$$\begin{matrix} \frac{1}{2} \end{matrix}$$
very rapidly enlarging whorls, the last very convex dorsally, imperforate; the apex is smooth, and the last whorl is spirally striate. The aperture is very large, oblique, transversely oval, the peristome continuous and free, thin. Carity of the spire very small, a thin, broad, concave columellar plate projecting across the end next the spire, as in Crepidula or Latia.

The soft parts are sinistral, externally Limnaeoid, with large black eyes near the inner bases of the short blunt cylindric tentacles.

Two adductor muscles, kidney-shaped in section, one on each side, replace the usual columellar muscle.

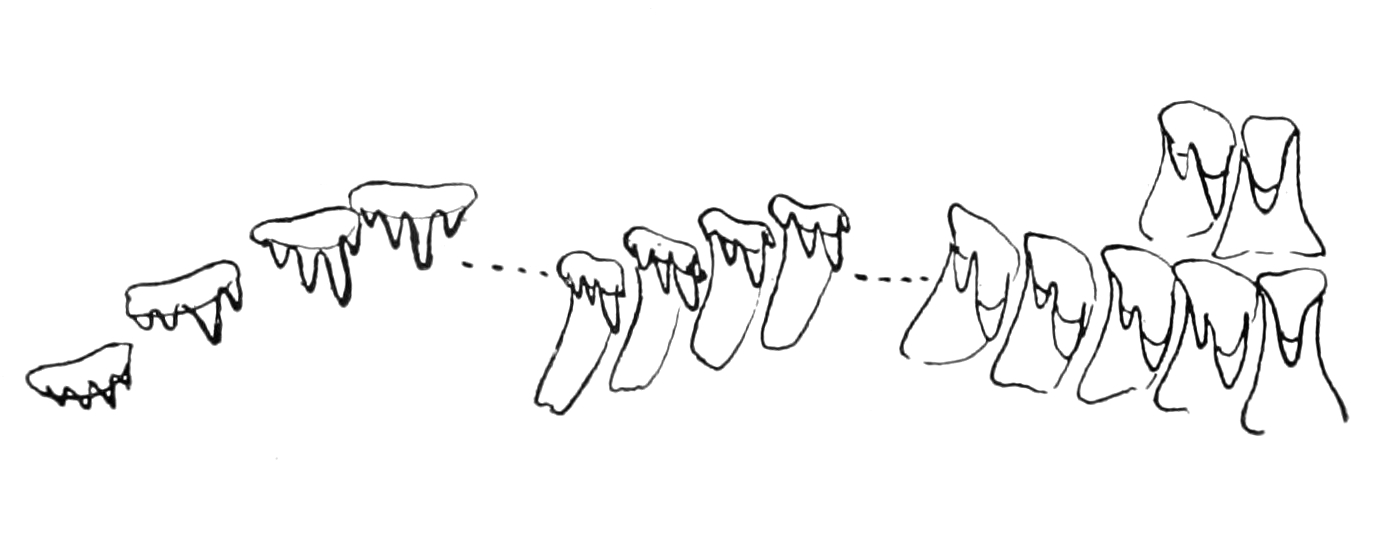
radula of Amphigyra alabamensis

The radula has 18, 1, 18 teeth, arranged about as in Lymnaea. Centrals with a single cusp, the laterals bicuspid, the outer cusp smaller. The transition teeth have four or five cusps. The marginal teeth are low, wide and separated, with four or five cusps.

PI. III, fig. 6, teeth of A. alabamensis.

There is a short false gill hanging in the pallial cavity.

The shell has some resemblance to Crepidula and Latia. Lepyrium and Pompholyx are also slightly similar; but the resemblance is no doubt superficial. Pompholyx, like Amphigyra, is sinistral with an ultrasinistral shell. It has no plate or lamina across the visceral cavity. The soft anatomy of Amphigyra, so far as worked out, seems to show most affinity with the Ancylidae.

The deck of Amphigyra is present at all stages of growth observed, in young as well as mature shells. In Gundlachia no septum is developed until a period of hybernation or aestivation is reached.

The shell is more solid than that of Ancylus or Gundlachia.
