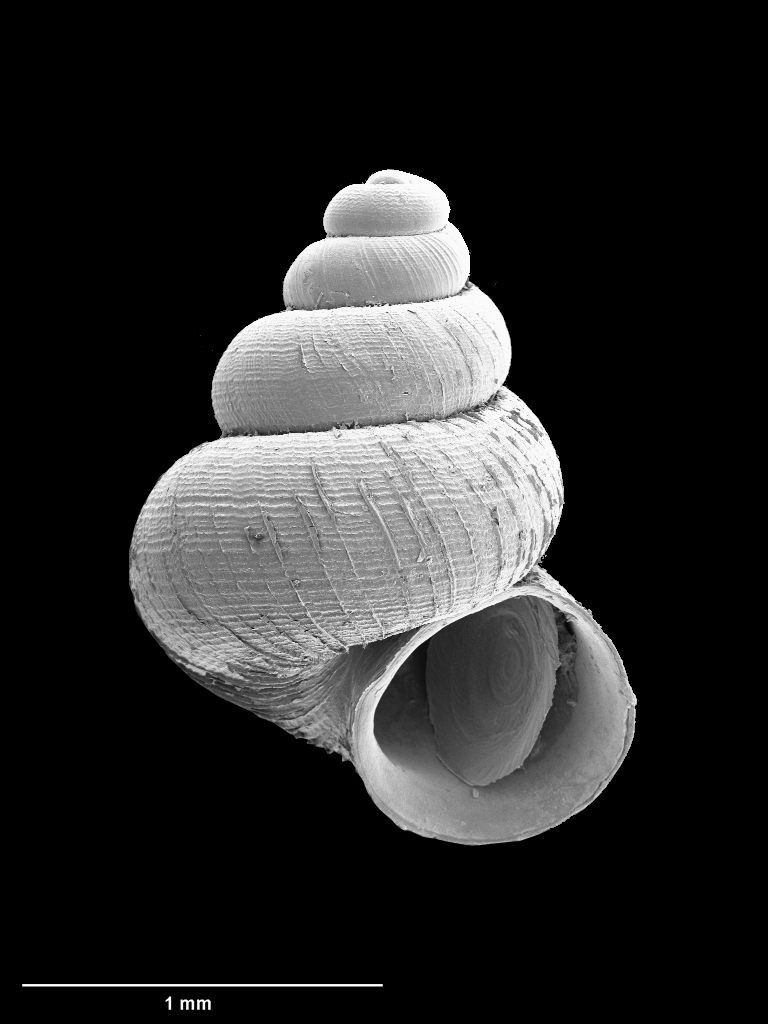

Conservation status
- Naturally Uncommon (NZ TCS)

Scientific classification
- Kingdom: Animalia
- Phylum: Mollusca
- Class: Gastropoda
- Subclass: Caenogastropoda
- Order: Architaenioglossa
- Family: Pupinidae
- Genus: Cytora
- Species: C. hazelwoodi

Binomial name
- Cytora hazelwoodi Marshall & Barker, 2007

= Cytora hazelwoodi =

Species of gastropod

Cytora hazelwoodi is a species of land snail that is endemic to New Zealand.

== Description ==
The shell grows up to a height of 2.03 millimetres (0.080 in). The shell height is larger than the width, with the height/width ratio being 1.32–1.45. It has a "translucent, yellowish brown" colour.

== Range ==
Cytora hazelwoodi is only found in the northeastern North Island, around the Coromandel Range and Kaimai Mamaku Conservation Park.

== Conservation status ==
Cytora hazelwoodi is listed under the New Zealand Threat Classification System as "Naturally Uncommon".

== Etymology ==
The species is named after Bruce F. Hazelwood.

== Taxonomy ==
The species was described in 2007. Its holotype is stored at the Te Papa Museum under registration number M.179668.

== See also ==
- List of non-marine molluscs of New Zealand
