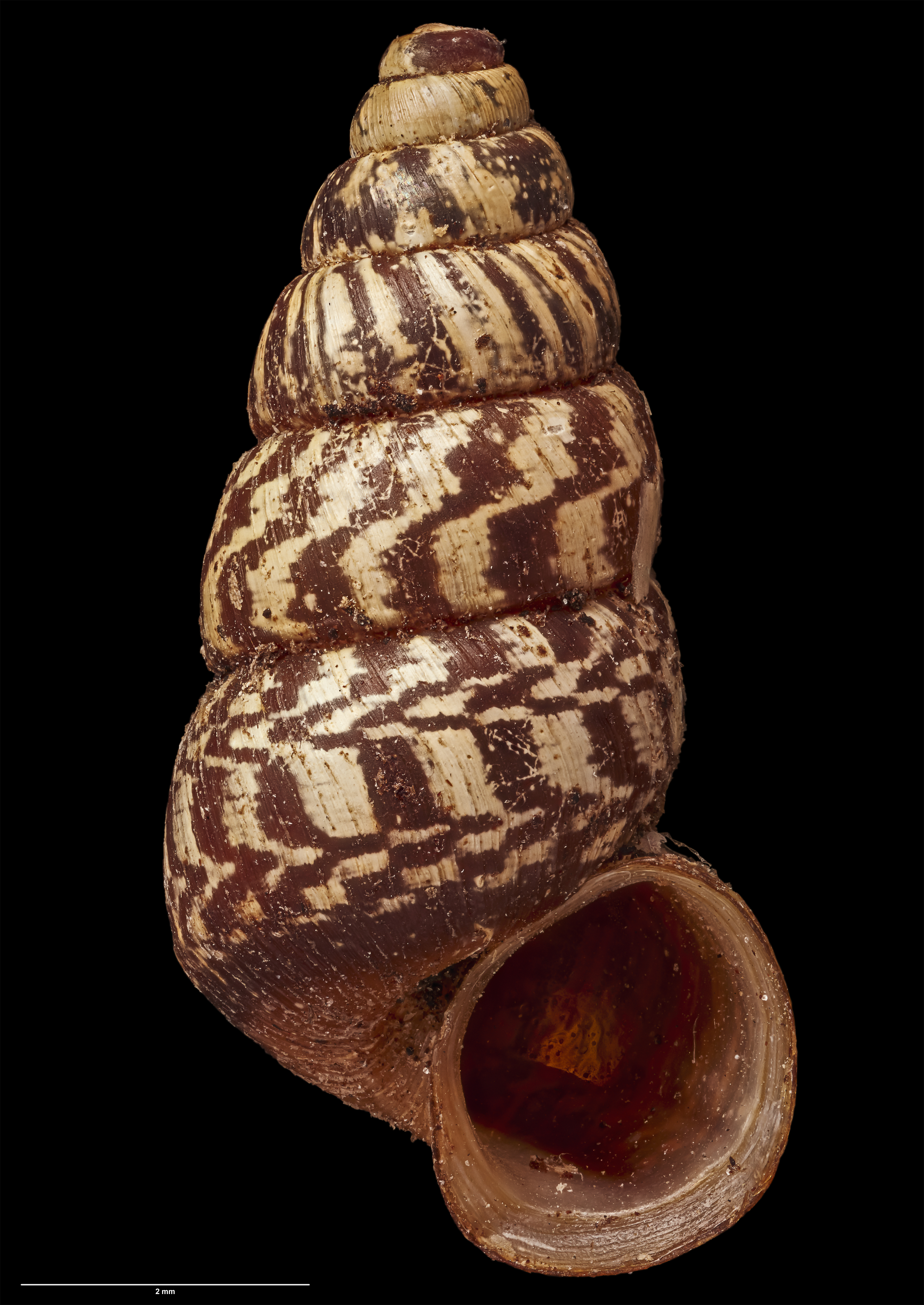
- L. egea tessellata

Scientific classification
- Kingdom: Animalia
- Phylum: Mollusca
- Class: Gastropoda
- Subclass: Caenogastropoda
- Order: Architaenioglossa
- Family: Pupinidae
- Genus: Liarea
- Species: L. egea

Binomial name
- Liarea egea (Gray, 1850)

Subspecies
- Liarea egea egea (Gray, 1850); Liarea egea tessellata Powell, 1954

Synonyms
- Realia egea Gray, 1850

= Liarea egea =

Species of gastropod

Liarea egea is a species of small land snail, a terrestrial gastropod mollusc in the family Pupinidae.

== Distribution ==
This species occurs in New Zealand.
