= Catapyrgus =

Scientific classification
- Kingdom: Animalia
- Phylum: Mollusca
- Class: Gastropoda
- Subclass: Caenogastropoda
- Order: Littorinimorpha
- Family: Tateidae
- Genus: Catapyrgus; Climo, 1974

Type species
- Catapyrgus spelaeus Climo, 1974

Genus of gastropods

Catapyrgus is a genus of gastropods belonging to the family Tateidae.

The species of this genus are found in New Zealand.

Species:

- Catapyrgus fraterculus Haase, 2008
- Catapyrgus jami Verhaegen & Haase, 2021
- Catapyrgus matapango Haase, 2008
- Catapyrgus sororius Haase, 2008
- Catapyrgus spelaeus Climo, 1974
