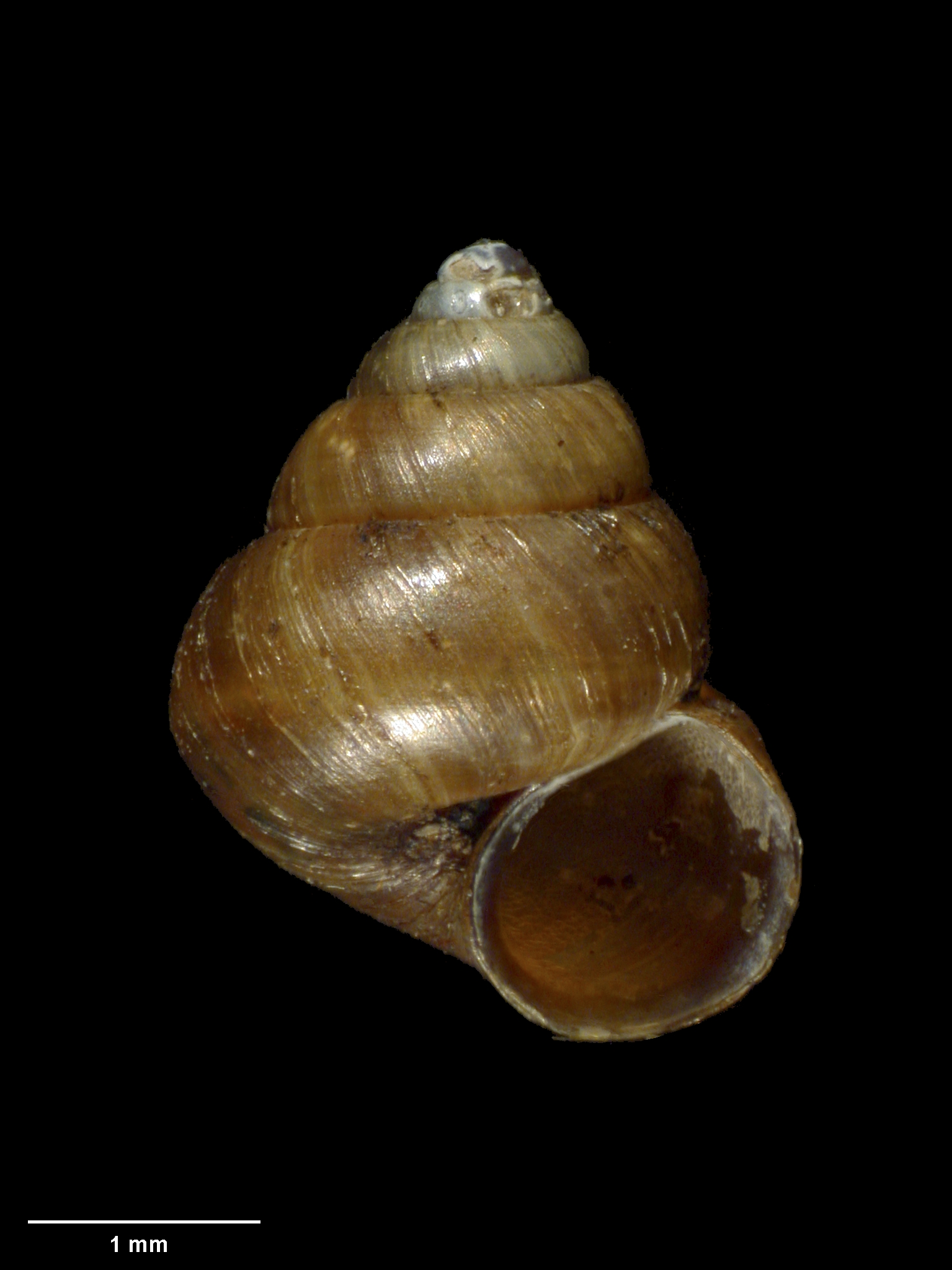

Scientific classification
- Kingdom: Animalia
- Phylum: Mollusca
- Class: Gastropoda
- Subclass: Caenogastropoda
- Order: Architaenioglossa
- Family: Pupinidae
- Genus: Cytora
- Species: C. kakano

Binomial name
- Cytora kakano Marshall & Barker, 2007

= Cytora kakano =

Species of gastropod

Cytora kakano is a species of land snail that is endemic to New Zealand.

== Description ==
The shell grows up to a height of 3.95 millimetres (0.156 in), with a height larger than width and a height/width ratio of 1.26–1.30. It has a "reddish brown" colour.

== Range ==
It is found in the northwestern South Island.

== Etymology ==
The species is named after the Māori word for seed.

== Taxonomy ==
Cytora kakano was described in 2007. Its holotype, found north east of Westport, is stored at the Te Papa Museum under registration number M.096727.

== See also ==
- List of non-marine molluscs of New Zealand
