= Liarea bicarinata =

Scientific classification
- Kingdom: Animalia
- Phylum: Mollusca
- Class: Gastropoda
- Subclass: Caenogastropoda
- Order: Architaenioglossa
- Family: Pupinidae
- Genus: Liarea
- Species: L. bicarinata

Binomial name
- Liarea bicarinata (Suter, 1907)

Synonyms
- Lagochilus bicarinatum Suter, 1907

Species of gastropod

Liarea bicarinata is a species of small land snail, a terrestrial gastropod mollusc in the family Pupinidae.

== Distribution ==
This species occurs in New Zealand.
