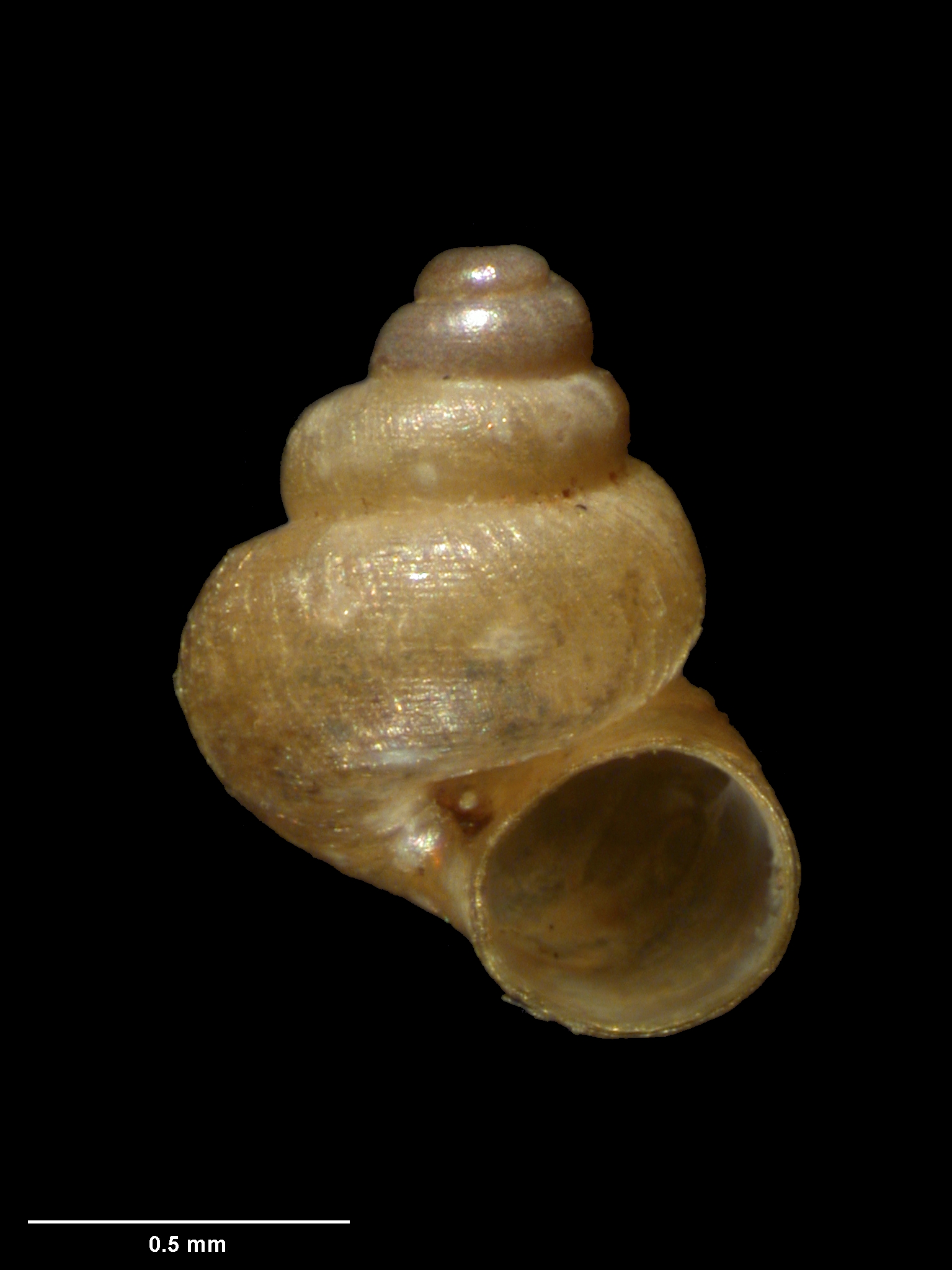

Scientific classification
- Kingdom: Animalia
- Phylum: Mollusca
- Class: Gastropoda
- Subclass: Caenogastropoda
- Order: Architaenioglossa
- Family: Pupinidae
- Genus: Cytora
- Species: C. minor

Binomial name
- Cytora minor Marshall & Barker, 2007

= Cytora minor =

Species of gastropod

Cytora minor is a species of land snail that is endemic to New Zealand.

== Description ==
The shells grows up to 1.26–1.53 millimetres (0.050–0.060 in) in height, and have a larger height than width. The shell is coloured "translucent, pale yellowish to reddish brown."

== Range ==
The species is found in the central North Island.

== Etymology ==
The species is named after the Latin word for "little".

== Taxonomy ==
The holotype is stored at the Te Papa Museum under registration number M.082612.

== See also ==
- List of non-marine molluscs of New Zealand
