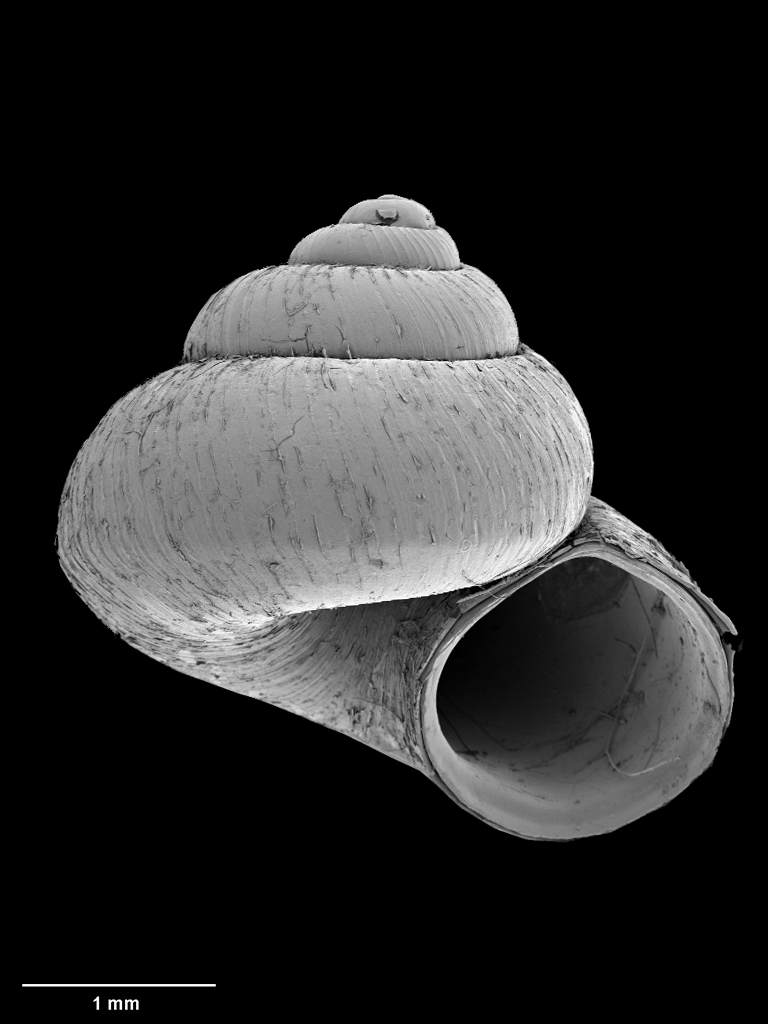

Scientific classification
- Kingdom: Animalia
- Phylum: Mollusca
- Class: Gastropoda
- Subclass: Caenogastropoda
- Order: Architaenioglossa
- Family: Pupinidae
- Genus: Cytora
- Species: C. jamiesoni

Binomial name
- Cytora jamiesoni Marshall & Barker, 2007

= Cytora jamiesoni =

Species of gastropod

Cytora jamiesoni is a species of land snail that is endemic to New Zealand.

== Description ==
The width of the shell grows up to 2.95–3.75 millimetres (0.116–0.148 in) and has a similar width and height, with a height/width ratio of 0.95–1.00.

== Range ==
Cytora jamiesoni is found from Karamea to Cape Farewell, which is in the northwest of the South Island.

== Etymology ==
The species was named after Peter Jamieson.

== Taxonomy ==
The holotype is stored at the Te Papa Museum under registration number M.179670.

== See also ==
- List of non-marine molluscs of New Zealand
