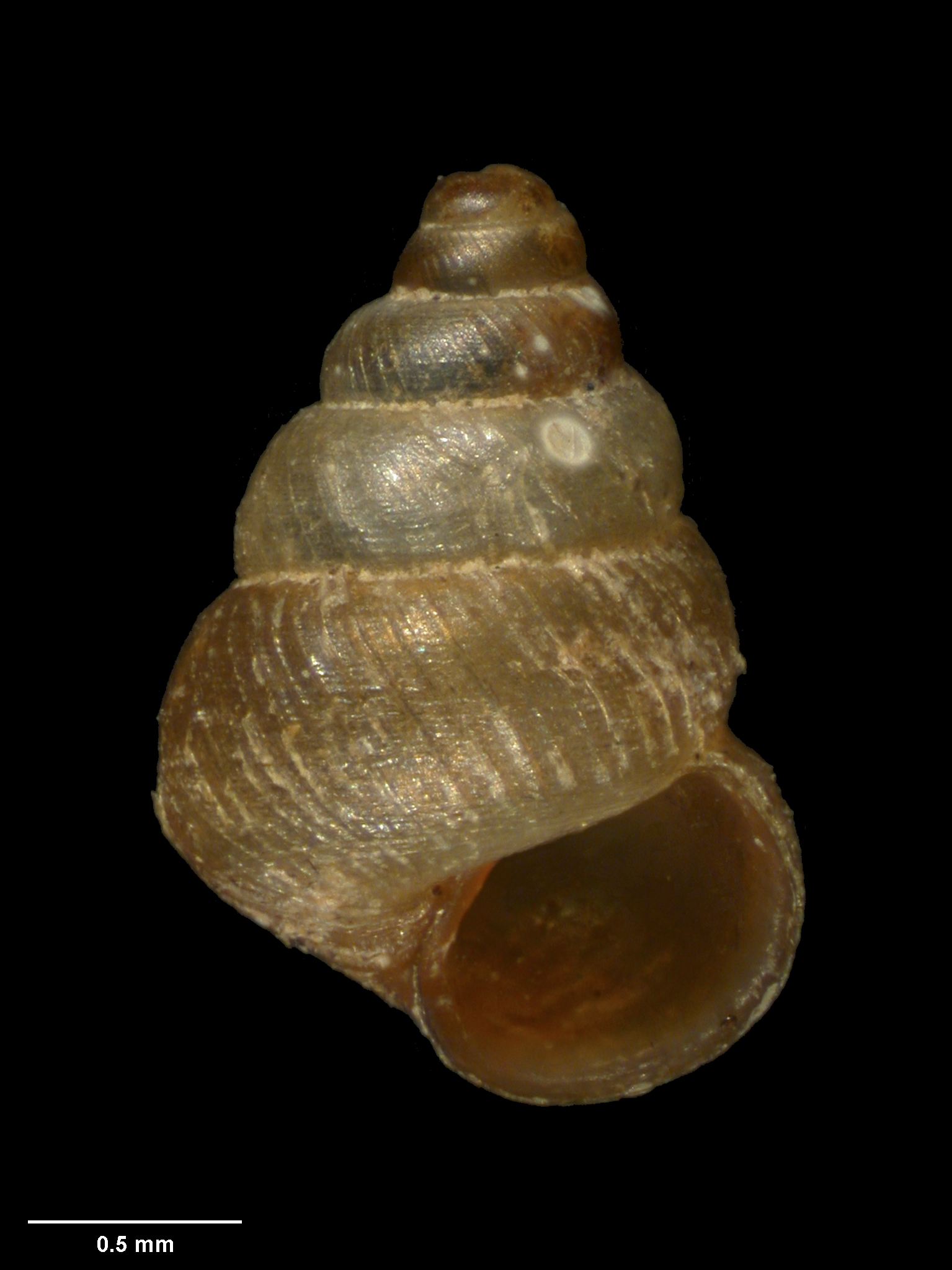

Scientific classification
- Kingdom: Animalia
- Phylum: Mollusca
- Class: Gastropoda
- Subclass: Caenogastropoda
- Order: Architaenioglossa
- Family: Pupinidae
- Genus: Cytora
- Species: C. pakotai

Binomial name
- Cytora pakotai Marshall & Barker, 2007

= Cytora pakotai =

Species of gastropod

Cytora pakotai is a species of land snail that is endemic to New Zealand.

== Description ==
The shells grow up to 2.2 millimetres (0.087 in) in height, and have a larger height than width. The shell is coloured "translucent, uniform pale yellowish brown."

== Range ==
The species is found in the western Northland Region, in the North Island.

== Taxonomy ==
The holotype is stored at the Te Papa Museum under registration number M.098334.

== See also ==
- List of non-marine molluscs of New Zealand
