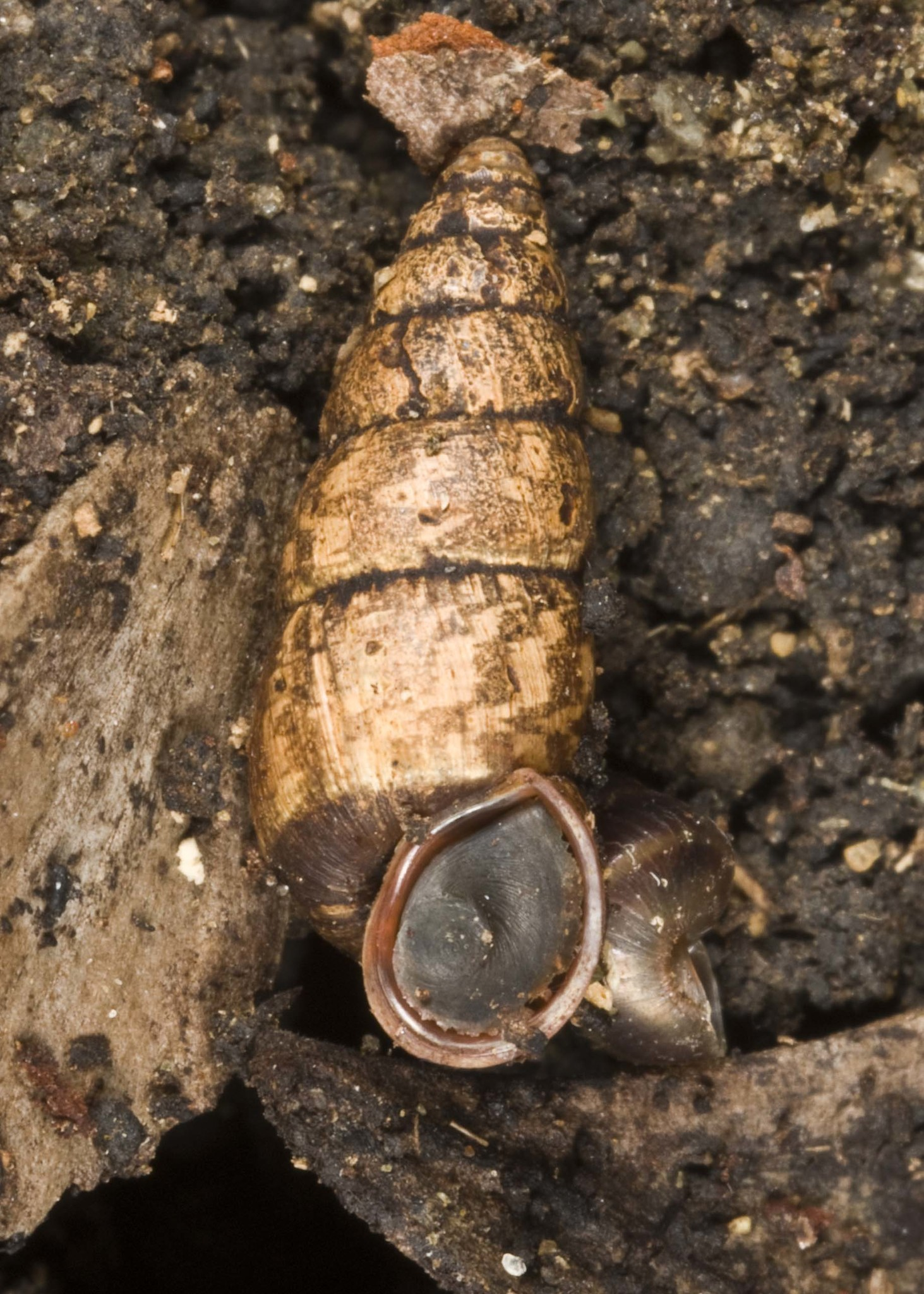

Scientific classification
- Kingdom: Animalia
- Phylum: Mollusca
- Class: Gastropoda
- Subclass: Caenogastropoda
- Order: Architaenioglossa
- Family: Pupinidae
- Genus: Liarea
- Species: L. aupouria

Binomial name
- Liarea aupouria Powell, 1954

Subspecies
- L. aupouria aupouria Powell, 1954; L. aupouria tara Powell, 1954

= Liarea aupouria =

Species of gastropod

Liarea aupouria is a species of land snail, a terrestrial gastropod mollusc in the subfamily Liareinae. This is the largest species in the genus.
