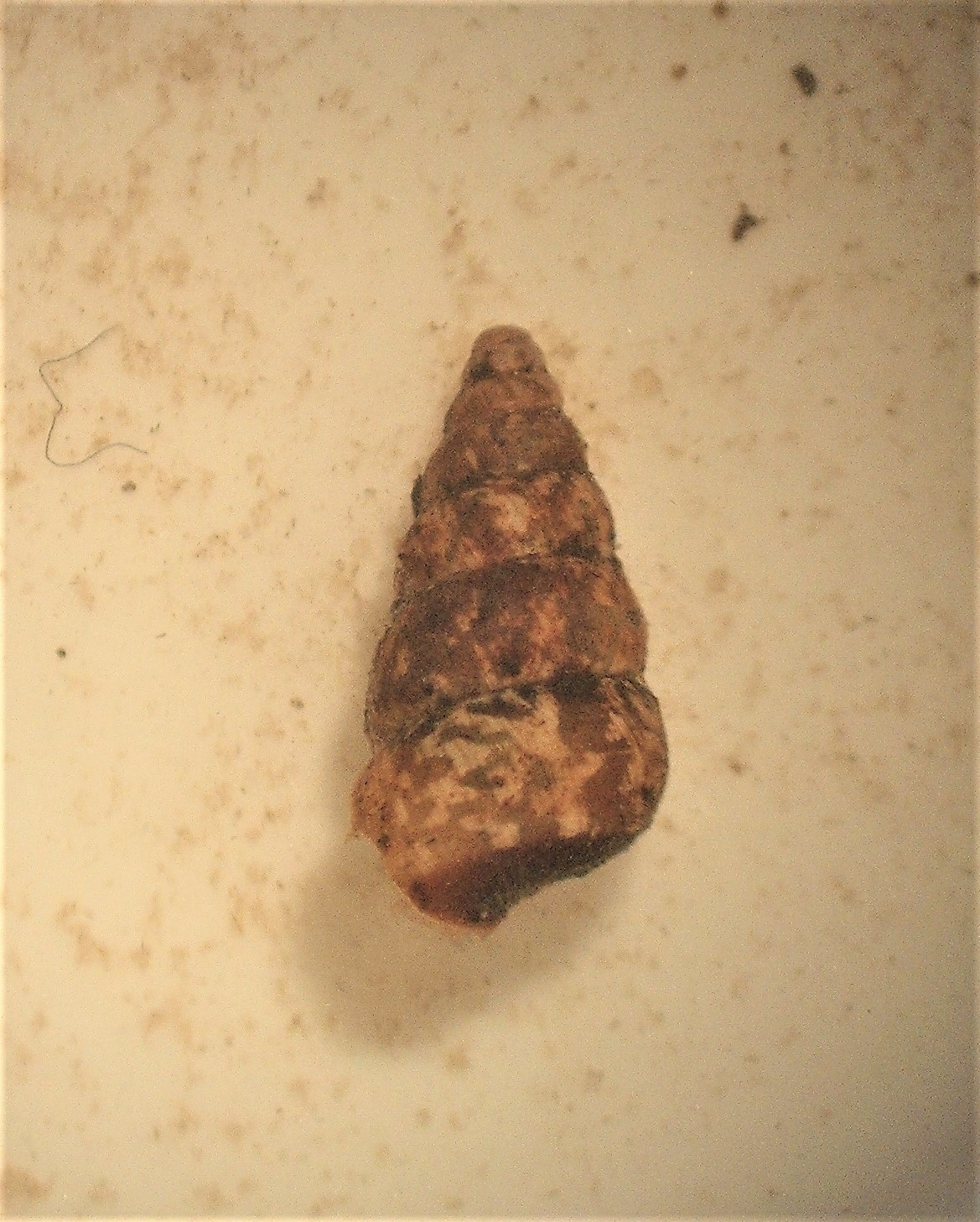

Scientific classification
- Kingdom: Animalia
- Phylum: Mollusca
- Class: Gastropoda
- Subclass: Caenogastropoda
- Order: Architaenioglossa
- Family: Pupinidae
- Genus: Liarea
- Species: L. lepida

Binomial name
- Liarea lepida (Suter, 1904)

Synonyms
- Realia turriculata lepida Suter, 1904

= Liarea lepida =

Species of gastropod

Liarea lepida is a species of small air-breathing land snail, a terrestrial pulmonate gastropod mollusc in the family Pupinidae.

== Distribution ==
This species occurs in New Zealand.
