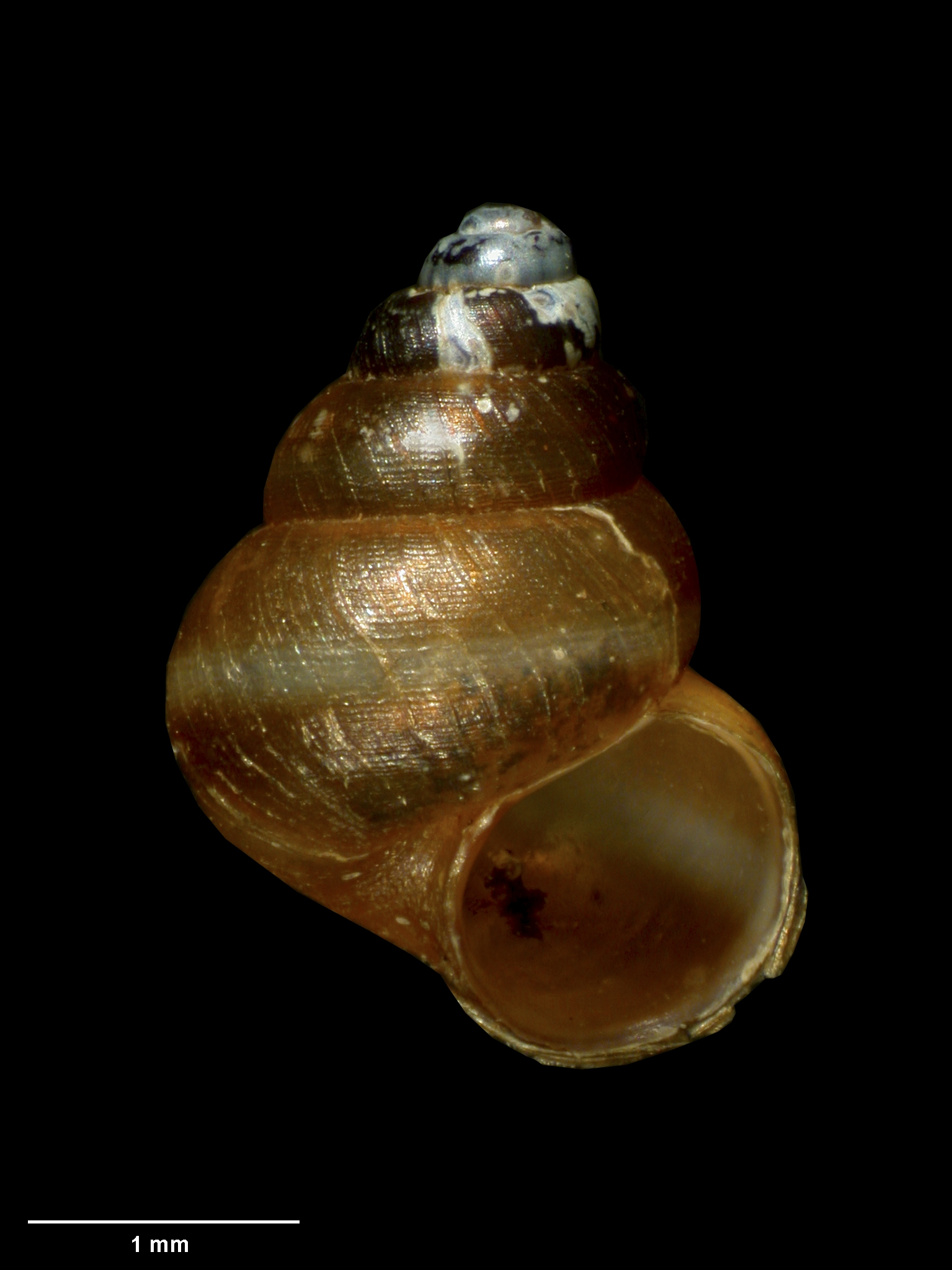

Conservation status
- Nationally Critical (NZ TCS)

Scientific classification
- Kingdom: Animalia
- Phylum: Mollusca
- Class: Gastropoda
- Subclass: Caenogastropoda
- Order: Architaenioglossa
- Family: Pupinidae
- Genus: Cytora
- Species: C. houhora

Binomial name
- Cytora houhora Marshall & Barker, 2007

= Cytora houhora =

Species of gastropod

Cytora houhora is a species of land snail that is endemic to New Zealand.

== Description ==
The height of the shell grows up to 3.88 millimetres (0.153 in) and has a larger height than width, with a height/width ratio of 1.43–1.49.

== Range ==
Cytora houhora is found around Tohoraha / Mount Camel, which is in Houhora, Northland.

== Conservation status ==
Cytora houhora is listed under the New Zealand Threat Classification System as "Nationally Critical".

== Etymology ==
The species was named after the town Houhora.

== Taxonomy ==
The holotype is stored at the Te Papa Museum under registration number M.179669.

== See also ==
- List of non-marine molluscs of New Zealand
