= Cytora motu =

Conservation status
- Naturally Uncommon (NZ TCS)

Scientific classification
- Kingdom: Animalia
- Phylum: Mollusca
- Class: Gastropoda
- Subclass: Caenogastropoda
- Order: Architaenioglossa
- Family: Pupinidae
- Genus: Cytora
- Species: C. motu

Binomial name
- Cytora motu Marshall & Barker, 2007

Species of gastropod

Cytora motu is a species of land snail that is endemic to New Zealand.

== Description ==
The shells grow up to 2.20–2.76 millimetres (0.087–0.109 in) in height, and have a larger height than width.

== Range ==
The species is found in the Bay of Islands, on the Poor Knights Islands and Battleship Rock.

== Conservation status ==
The species is listed under the New Zealand Threat Classification System as "Nationally Uncommon".

== Etymology ==
The species is named after the Māori word for "island".

== See also ==
- List of non-marine molluscs of New Zealand
