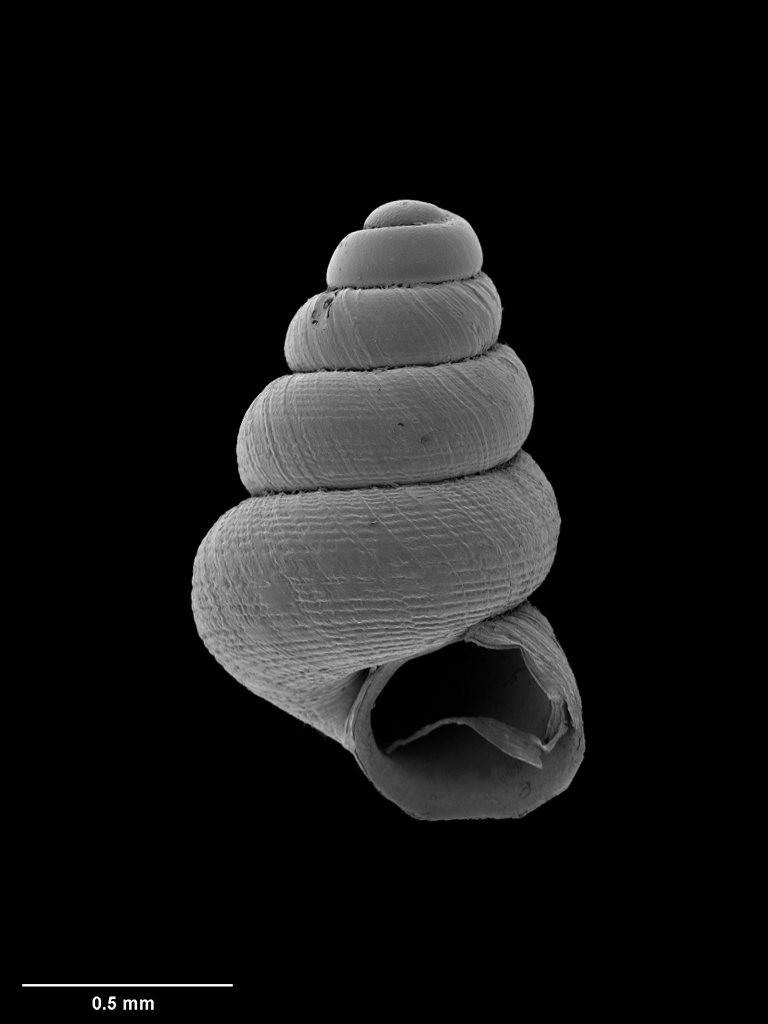

Conservation status
- Nationally Endangered (NZ TCS)

Scientific classification
- Kingdom: Animalia
- Phylum: Mollusca
- Class: Gastropoda
- Subclass: Caenogastropoda
- Order: Architaenioglossa
- Family: Pupinidae
- Genus: Cytora
- Species: C. gardneri

Binomial name
- Cytora gardneri Marshall & Barker, 2007

= Cytora gardneri =

Species of gastropod

Cytora gardneri is a species of land snail that is endemic to New Zealand.

== Description ==
The shells grows up to 1.5–2 millimetres (0.059–0.079 in) in height, and have a larger height than width. The shell is coloured "translucent yellowish to light reddish brown."

== Range ==
Cytora gardneri is found in the far north of Aupouri Peninsula, which is at the northern tip of the North Island.

== Conservation status ==
Cytora gardneri is listed under the New Zealand Threat Classification System as "Nationally Endangered".

== Etymology ==
The species is named after Norman W. Gardner, who was a malacologist.

== Taxonomy ==
The holotype is stored at the Te Papa Museum under registration number M.179667.

== See also ==
- List of non-marine molluscs of New Zealand
