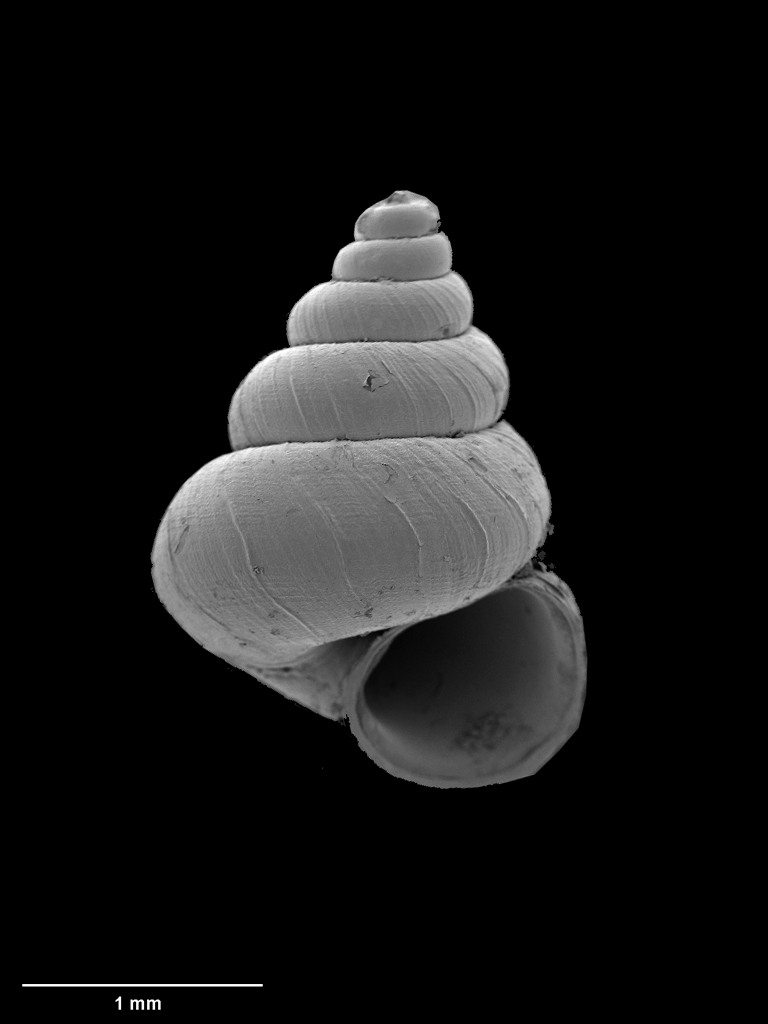

Scientific classification
- Kingdom: Animalia
- Phylum: Mollusca
- Class: Gastropoda
- Subclass: Caenogastropoda
- Order: Architaenioglossa
- Family: Pupinidae
- Genus: Cytora
- Species: C. maui

Binomial name
- Cytora maui Marshall & Barker, 2007

= Cytora maui =

Species of gastropod

Cytora maui is a species of land snail that is endemic to New Zealand.

== Description ==
The shells grows up to 1.75–2.90 millimetres (0.069–0.114 in) in height, and have a larger height than width. The shell is coloured reddish brown.

== Range ==
The species is found south-west of Turangi, which is near Taupō, in the North Island.

== Etymology ==
The species is named after Māui, a figure in Māori mythology.

== Taxonomy ==
The holotype is stored at the Te Papa Museum under registration number M.183065.

== See also ==
- List of non-marine molluscs of New Zealand
