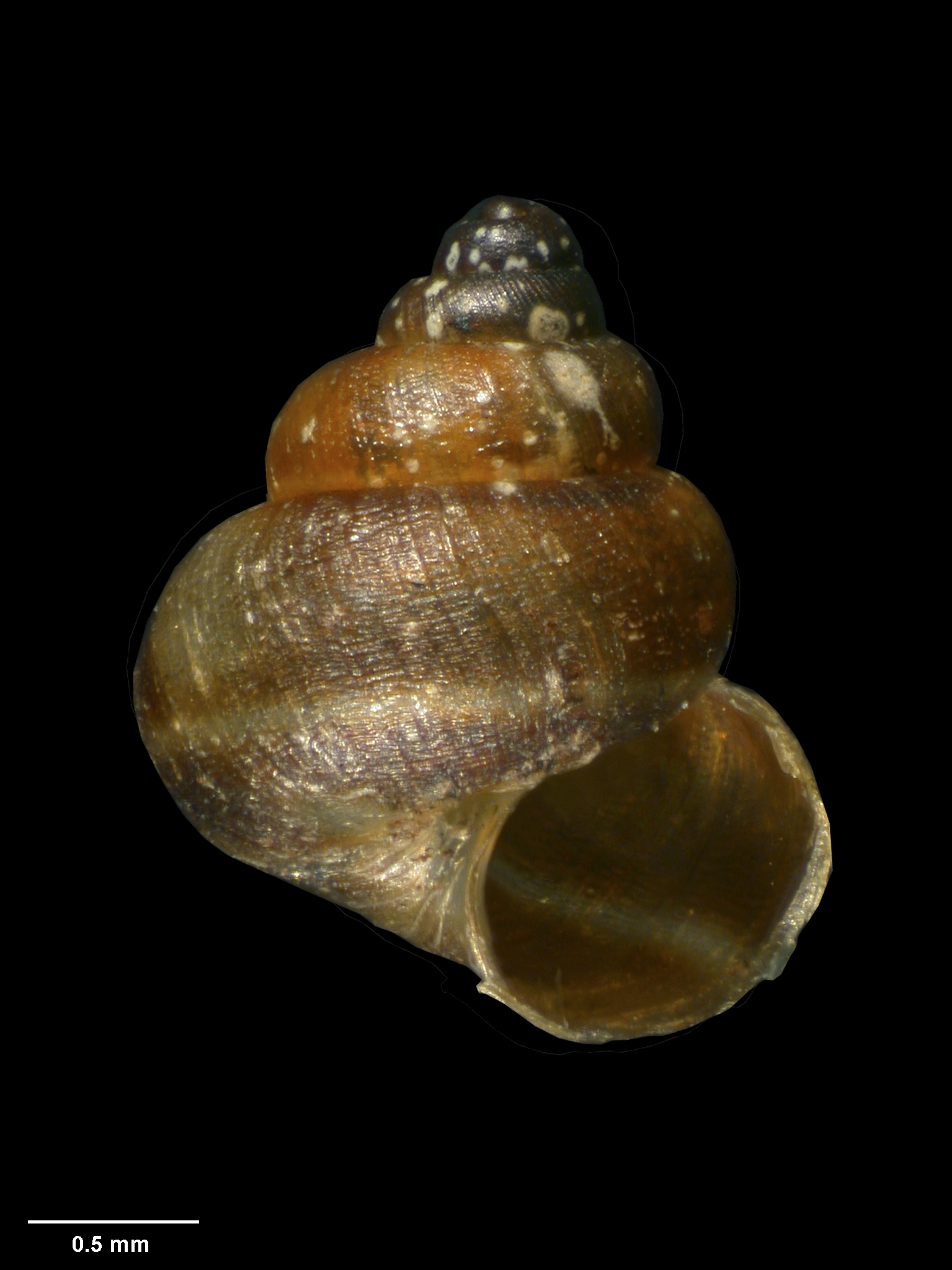

Conservation status
- Naturally Uncommon (NZ TCS)

Scientific classification
- Kingdom: Animalia
- Phylum: Mollusca
- Class: Gastropoda
- Subclass: Caenogastropoda
- Order: Architaenioglossa
- Family: Pupinidae
- Genus: Cytora
- Species: C. climoi

Binomial name
- Cytora climoi Marshall & Barker, 2007

= Cytora climoi =

Species of gastropod

Cytora climoi is a species of land snail that is endemic to New Zealand.

== Description ==
The shell grows up to a height of 2.65 millimetres (0.104 in), with a height larger than width. It has a "reddish brown" colour.

== Conservation status ==
Cytora climoi is listed under the New Zealand Threat Classification System as "Naturally Uncommon".

== Etymology ==
The species is named after Francis Martin Climo.

== Taxonomy ==
Cytora climoi was described in 2007. Its holotype, found at Knuckle Hill, northwest of Collingwood, is stored at the Te Papa Museum under registration number M.179666.

== See also ==
- List of non-marine molluscs of New Zealand
