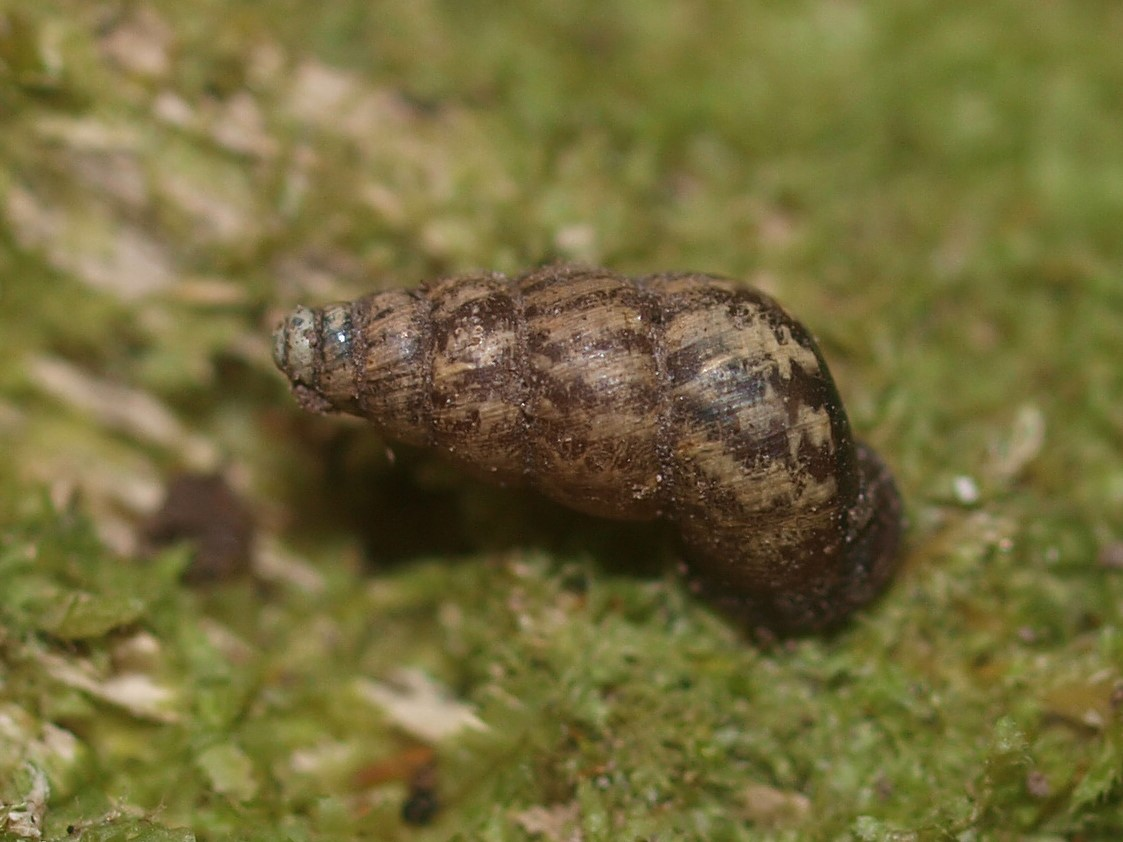

Scientific classification
- Kingdom: Animalia
- Phylum: Mollusca
- Class: Gastropoda
- Subclass: Caenogastropoda
- Order: Architaenioglossa
- Family: Pupinidae
- Genus: Liarea
- Species: L. turriculata

Binomial name
- Liarea turriculata (Pfeiffer, 1855)

Subspecies
- Liarea turriculata partula Powell, 1954; Liarea turriculata turriculata Pfeiffer, 1855; Liarea turriculata waipoua Powell, 1954

Synonyms
- Realia turriculata Pfeiffer, 1855

= Liarea turriculata =

Species of gastropod

Liarea turriculata is a species of small air-breathing land snail, a terrestrial pulmonate gastropod mollusc in the family Pupinidae.

== Distribution ==
This species occurs in New Zealand.
