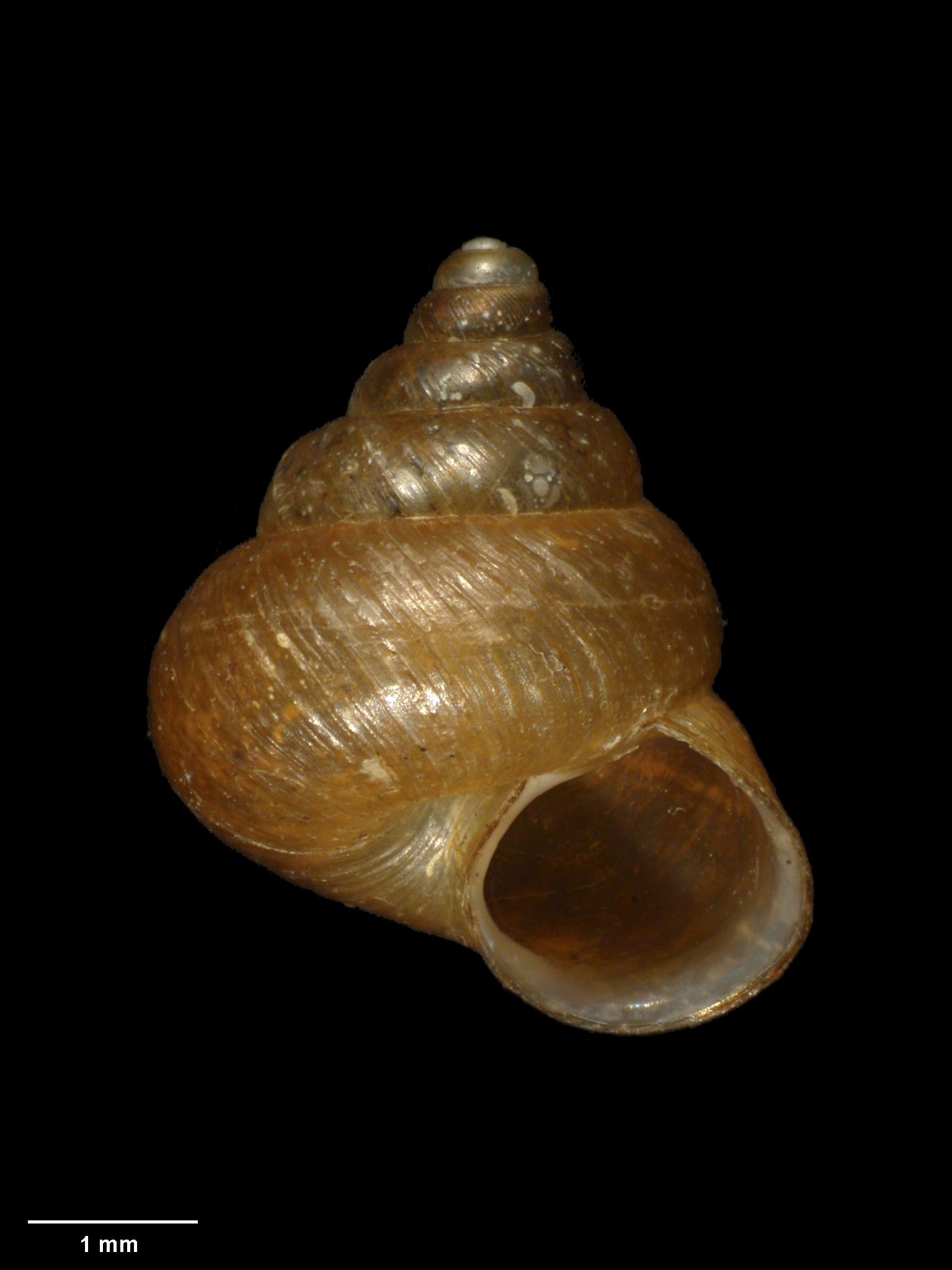

Conservation status
- Nationally Endangered (NZ TCS)

Scientific classification
- Kingdom: Animalia
- Phylum: Mollusca
- Class: Gastropoda
- Subclass: Caenogastropoda
- Order: Architaenioglossa
- Family: Pupinidae
- Genus: Cytora
- Species: C. brooki

Binomial name
- Cytora brooki Marshall & Barker, 2007

= Cytora brooki =

Species of gastropod

Cytora brooki is a species of land snail that is endemic to New Zealand.

== Description ==
The height of the shell grows up to 5.6 millimetres (0.22 in).

== Range ==
Cytora brooki is only found on the north west of the Aupōuri Peninsula, at elevations up to approximately 250 metres (820 ft). The species has been found in holocene dune fossils at Te Werahi.

== Conservation status ==
Cytora brooki is listed under the New Zealand Threat Classification System as "Nationally Endangered".

== Etymology ==
Cytora brooki was named after Fred J. Brook due to his work on biogeography and "systematics of terrestrial pulmonates".

== Taxonomy ==
This species was described in 2007. A specimen is stored at Te Papa under registration number M.188693.

== See also ==
- List of non-marine molluscs of New Zealand
