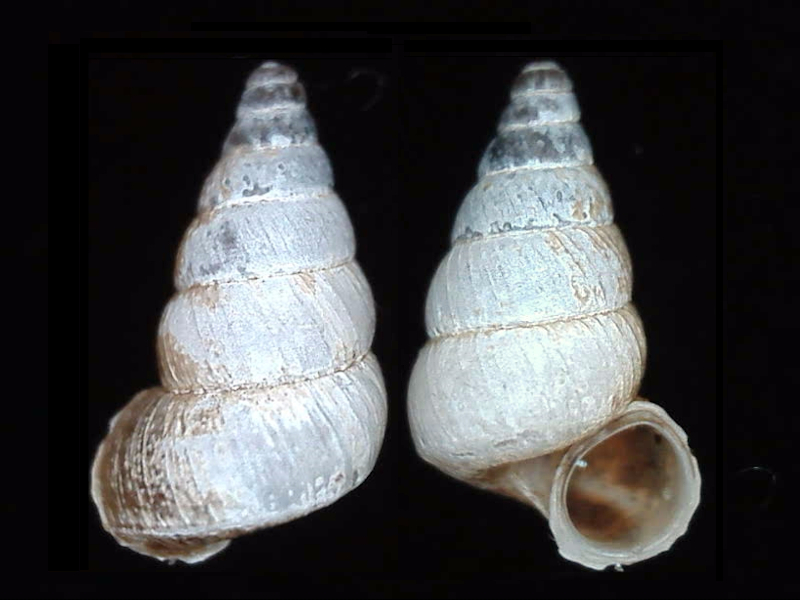
- Liarea hochstetteri

Scientific classification
- Kingdom: Animalia
- Phylum: Mollusca
- Class: Gastropoda
- Subclass: Caenogastropoda
- Order: Architaenioglossa
- Family: Pupinidae
- Subfamily: Liareinae
- Genus: Liarea; Gray, 1853

Species
- See text

Synonyms
- Omphalotropis (Realia) Gray, 1850; Realia Gray, 1850

= Liarea =

Genus of gastropods

Liarea is a genus of land snails with an operculum, terrestrial gastropod molluscs in the subfamily Liareinae.

== Species ==
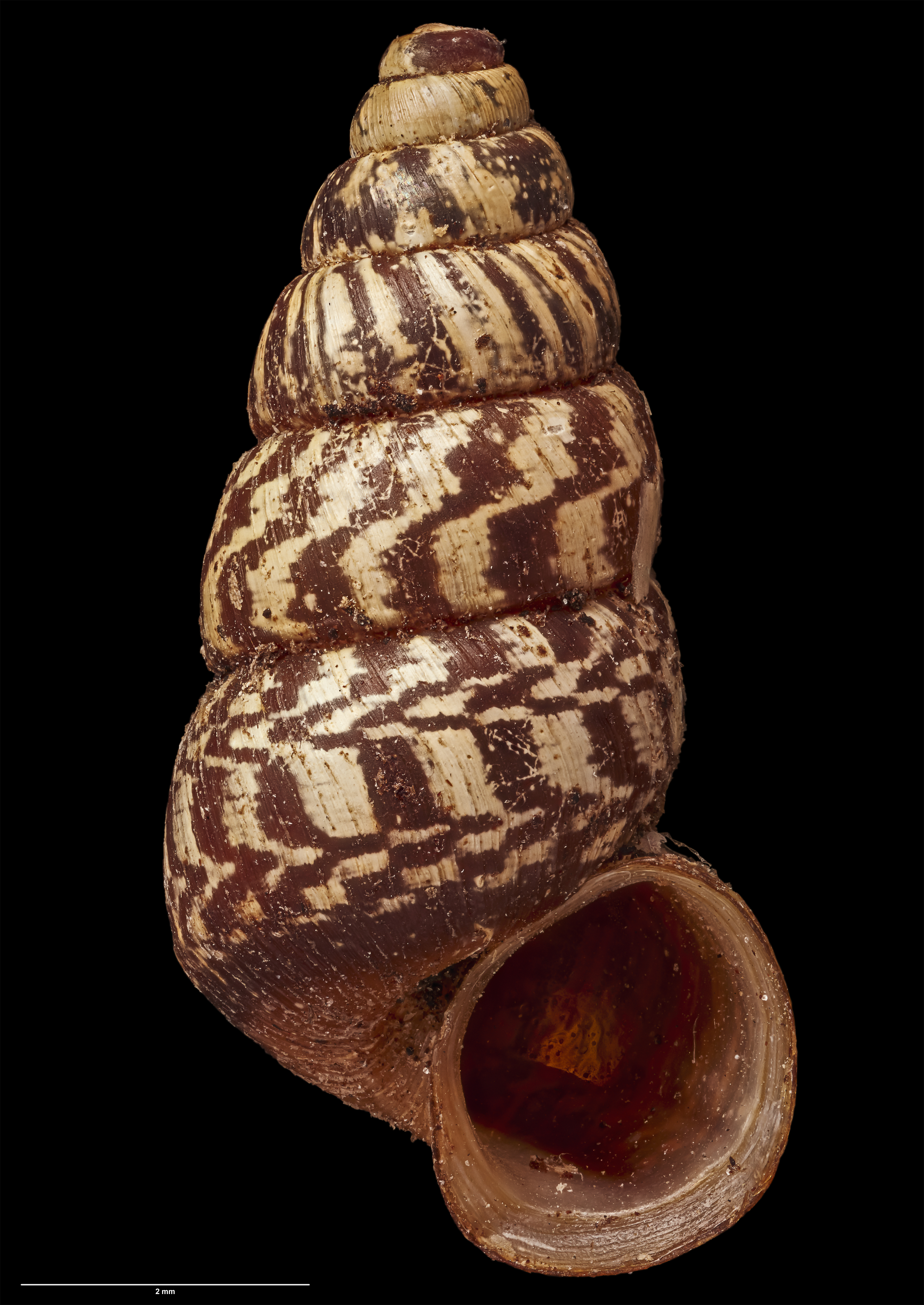
Liarea egea tessellata

The following species are recognised in the genus Liarea:

- Liarea aupouria Powell, 1954
- Liarea bicarinata (Suter, 1907)
- Liarea egea (Gray, 1850)
- Liarea hochstetteri (Pfeiffer, 1861)
- Liarea lepida (Suter, 1904)
- Liarea ornata Powell, 1954
- Liarea turriculata (Pfeiffer, 1855)
