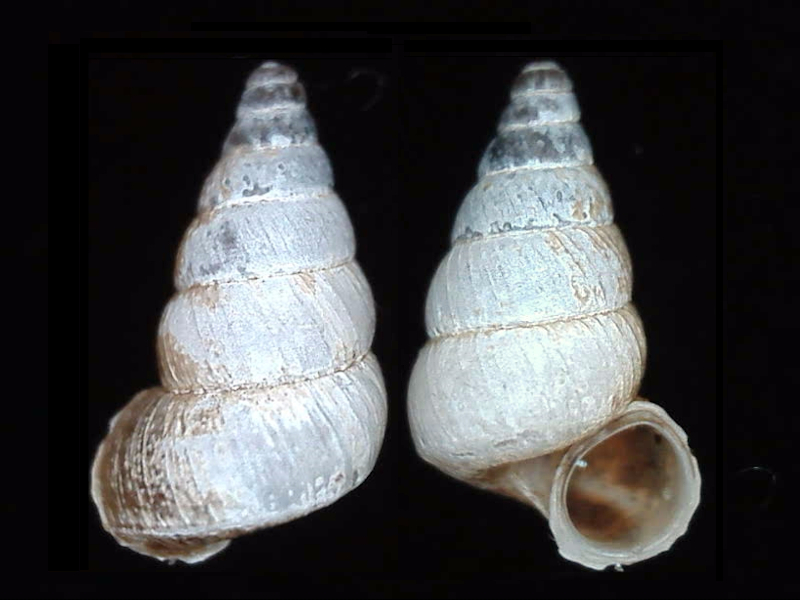
- L. hochstetteri ssp. carinella

Scientific classification
- Kingdom: Animalia
- Phylum: Mollusca
- Class: Gastropoda
- Subclass: Caenogastropoda
- Order: Architaenioglossa
- Family: Pupinidae
- Genus: Liarea
- Species: L. hochstetteri

Binomial name
- Liarea hochstetteri (Pfeiffer, 1861)

Subspecies
- L. hochstetteri alta Powell, 1954; L. hochstetteri carinella (Pfeiffer, 1861); L. hochstetteri hochstetteri (Pfeiffer, 1861)

Synonyms
- Realia hochstetteri Pfeiffer, 1861

= Liarea hochstetteri =

Species of gastropod

Liarea hochstetteri is a species of small air-breathing land snail, a terrestrial pulmonate gastropod mollusc in the family Pupinidae.

== Distribution ==
This species occurs in New Zealand.
