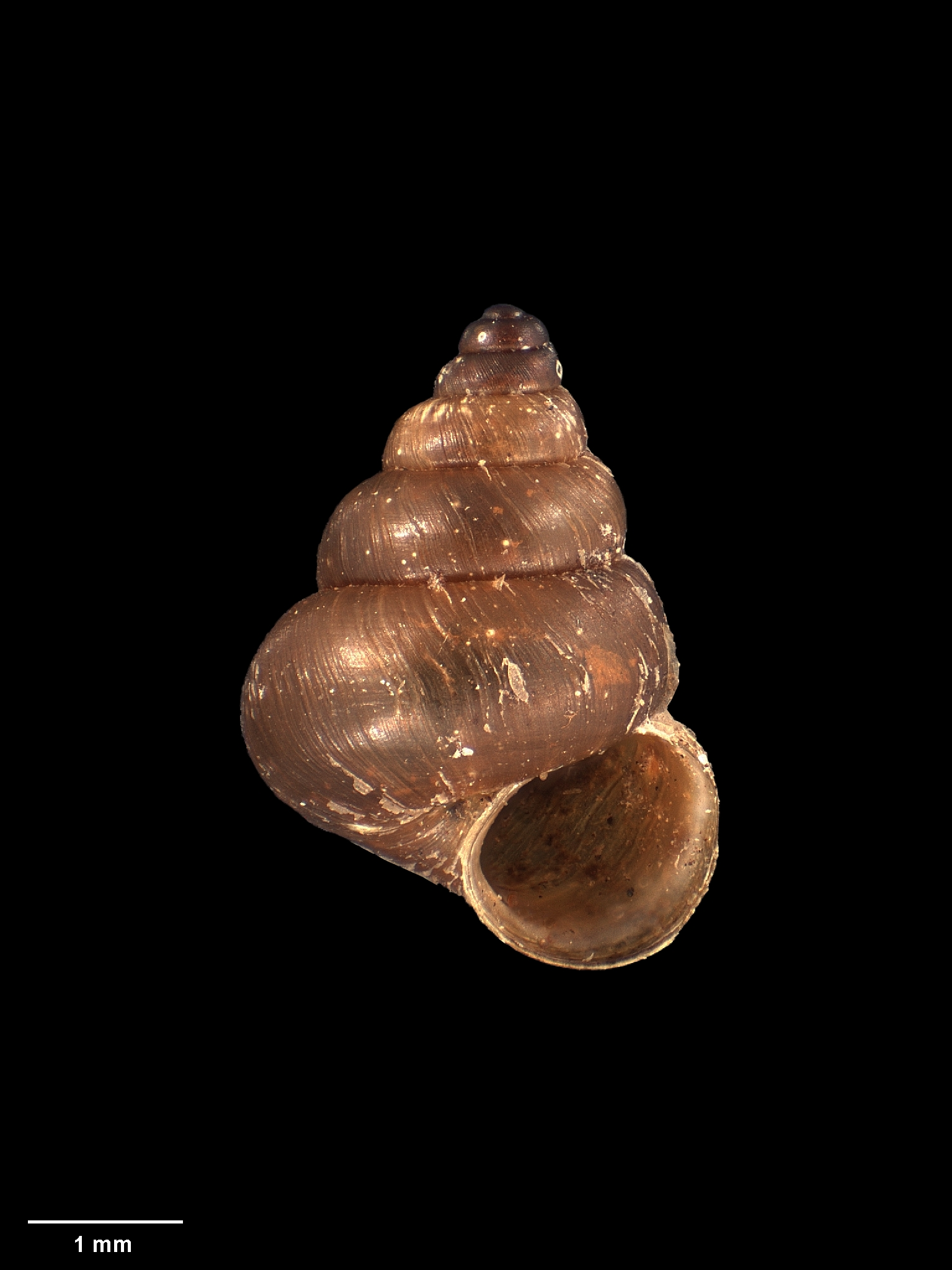

Scientific classification
- Kingdom: Animalia
- Phylum: Mollusca
- Class: Gastropoda
- Subclass: Caenogastropoda
- Order: Architaenioglossa
- Family: Pupinidae
- Genus: Cytora
- Species: C. mayhillae

Binomial name
- Cytora mayhillae Marshall & Barker, 2007

= Cytora mayhillae =

Species of gastropod

Cytora mayhillae is a species of land snail that is endemic to New Zealand.

== Description ==
The shells grows up to 4.35 millimetres (0.171 in) in height, and have a larger height than width. The shell is reddish brown.

== Range ==
The species is found in Fiordland, in the southern South Island.

== Etymology ==
The species is named after the collector Pauline Constance Mayhill.

== Taxonomy ==
The holotype is stored at the Te Papa Museum under registration number M.146093.

== See also ==
- List of non-marine molluscs of New Zealand
