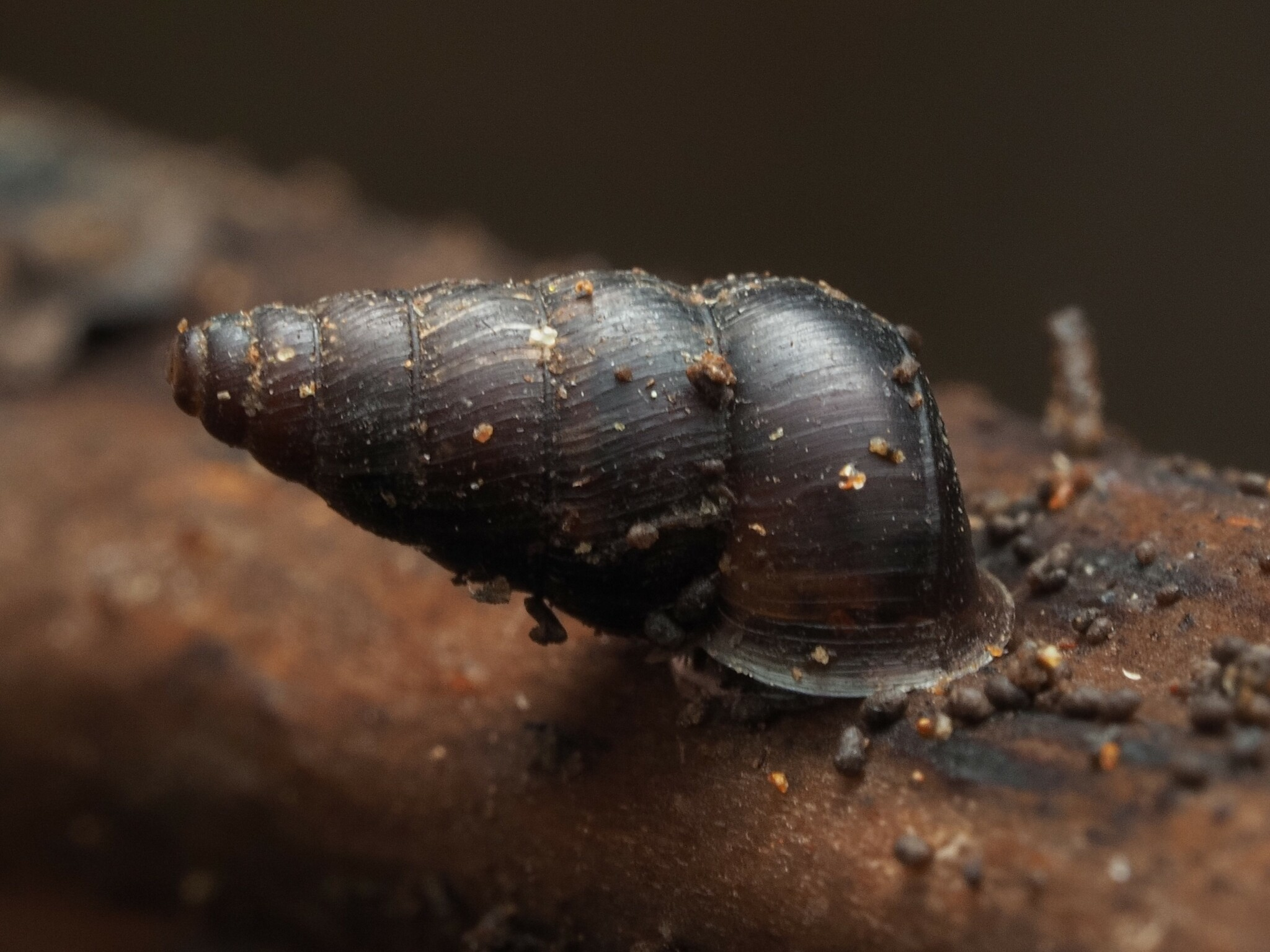

Scientific classification
- Kingdom: Animalia
- Phylum: Mollusca
- Class: Gastropoda
- Subclass: Caenogastropoda
- Order: Architaenioglossa
- Family: Pupinidae
- Genus: Liarea
- Species: L. ornata

Binomial name
- Liarea ornata Powell, 1954

= Liarea ornata =

Species of gastropod

Liarea ornata is a species of small air-breathing land snail, a terrestrial gastropod mollusc in the family Pupinidae.

== Distribution ==
This species occurs in New Zealand.
