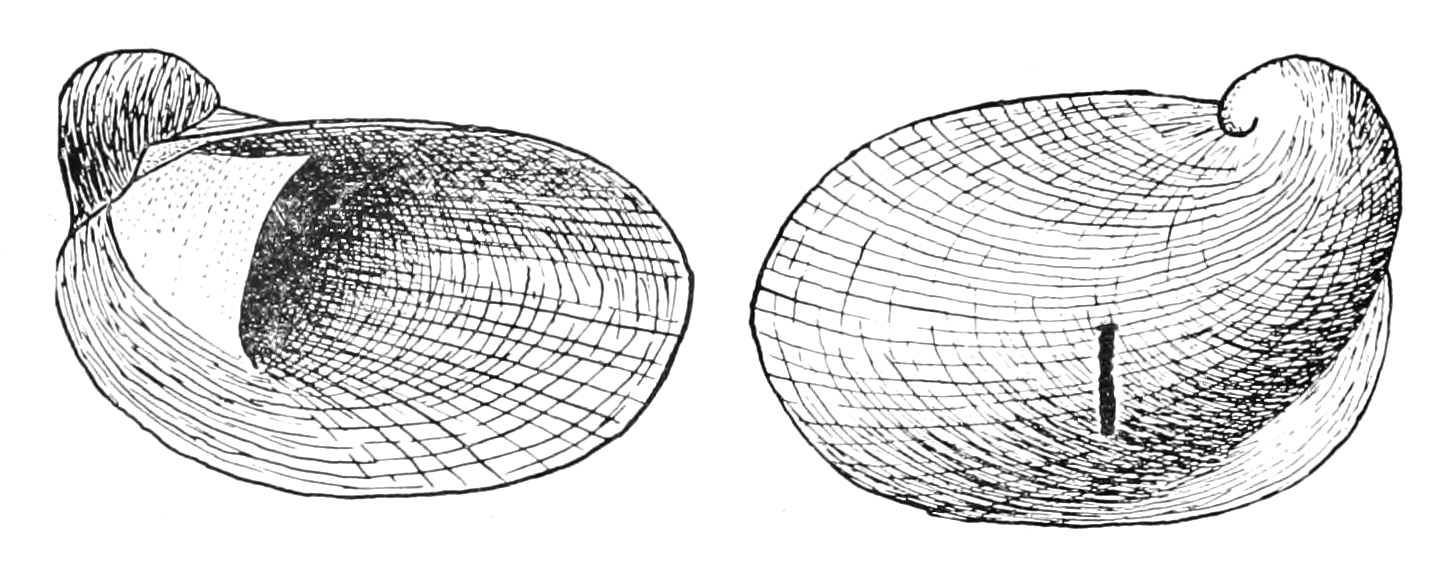
- Shells of Amphigyra alabamensis

Conservation status
- Extinct (IUCN 2.3)

- Presumed Extinct (NatureServe)

Scientific classification
- Kingdom: Animalia
- Phylum: Mollusca
- Class: Gastropoda
- Superorder: Hygrophila
- Family: Planorbidae
- Genus: Amphigyra
- Species: †A. alabamensis

Binomial name
- †Amphigyra alabamensis Pilsbry, 1906
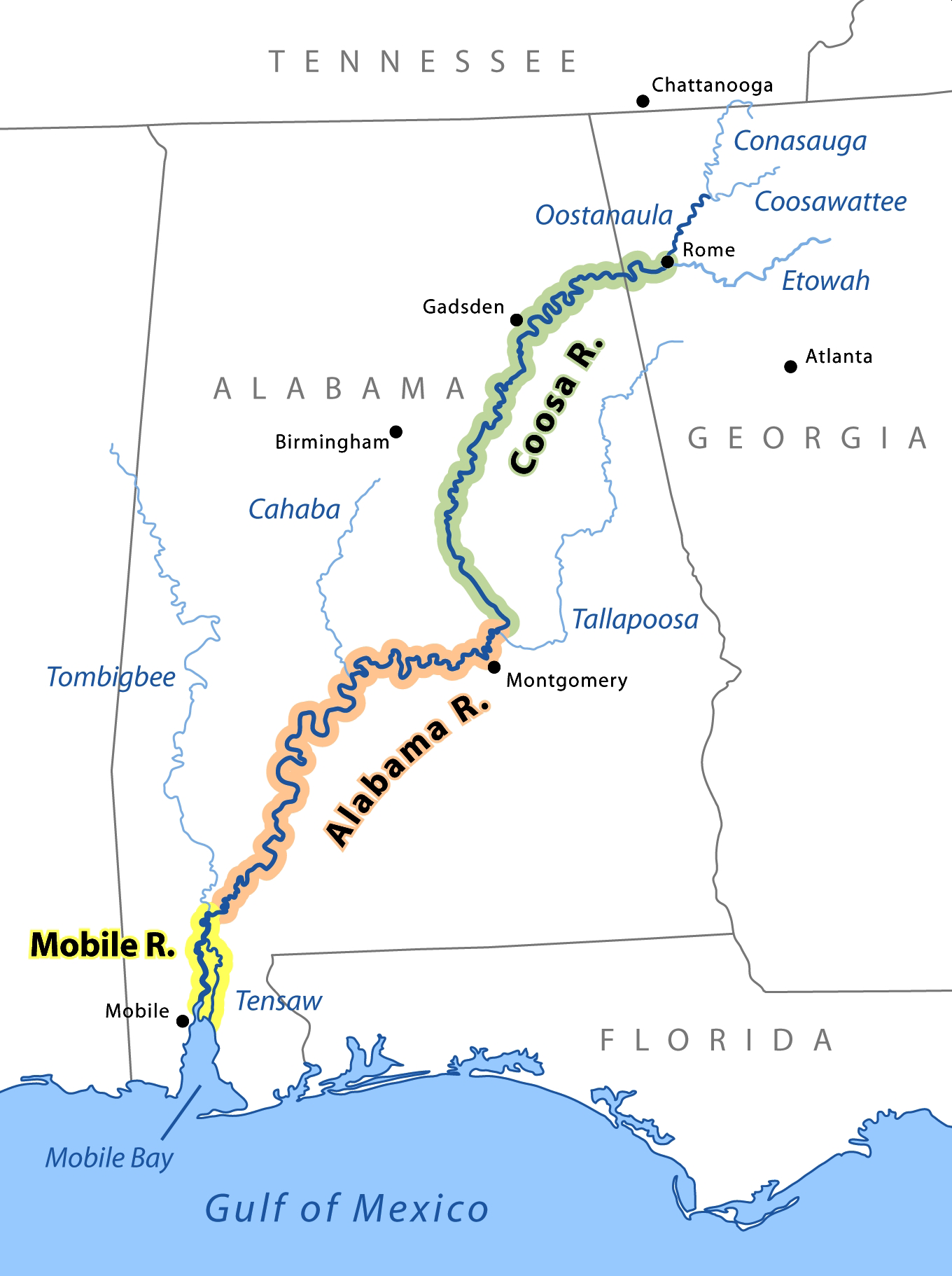
- Location of the Coosa River, in green

= Shoal sprite =

Species of gastropod

The shoal sprite (Amphigyra alabamensis) was a species of small, air-breathing, freshwater snail, an aquatic pulmonate gastropod mollusk in the family Planorbidae, the ram's horn snails. This species was endemic to Alabama, but it is now extinct.

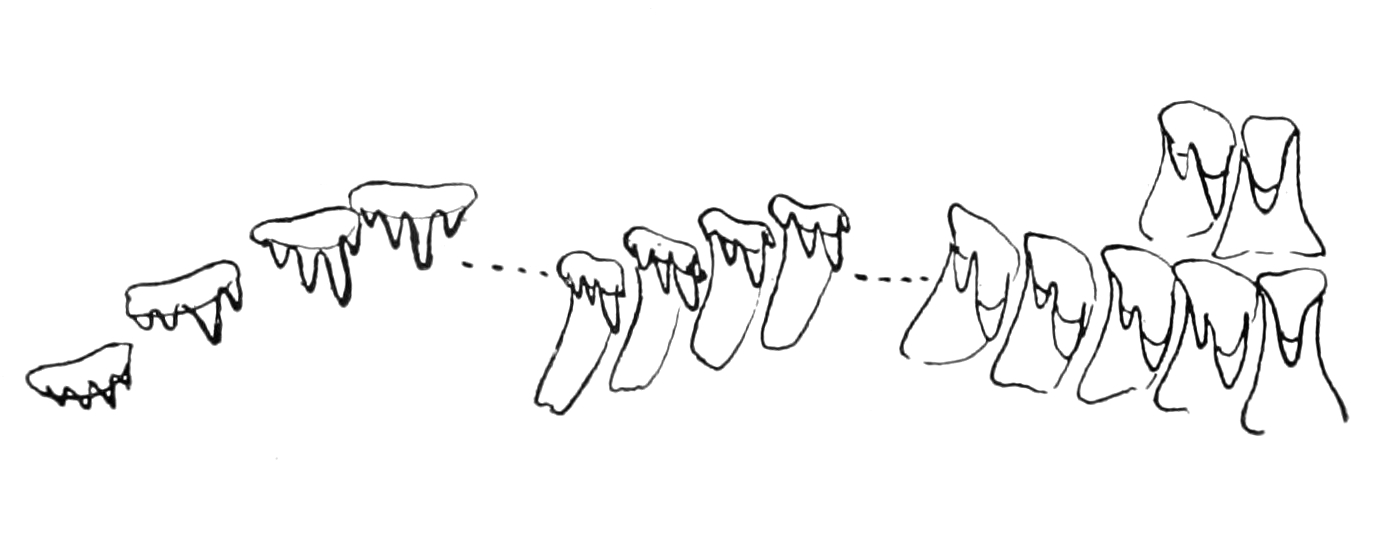
Drawing of detail of the radula of Amphigyra alabamensis

== Original description ==
Species Amphigyra alabamensis was originally described by Henry Augustus Pilsbry in 1906.

Type locality is Coosa River near or in Wetumpka, Alabama.

Pilsbry's original text (the type description) reads as follows:

Amphigyra alabamensis n. sp. PI. III, figs. 1, 2.

The shell is shaped like a convex Crepidula, closely, finely and sharply striate spirally, and of a pale yellowish-corneous tint. The last whorl flares in a raised ledge at the baso-columellar region, the back being very convex. The spire is slightly sunken, depressed. The raised parietal margin of the lip is abruptly kinked where it passes across the preceding whorl. The columellar plate or deck extends over nearly one-third the total transverse length of the aperture. Alt. 1.1, diam. 2 mm.

Wetumpka, Alabama, on the under surfaces of rocks in swift water.
