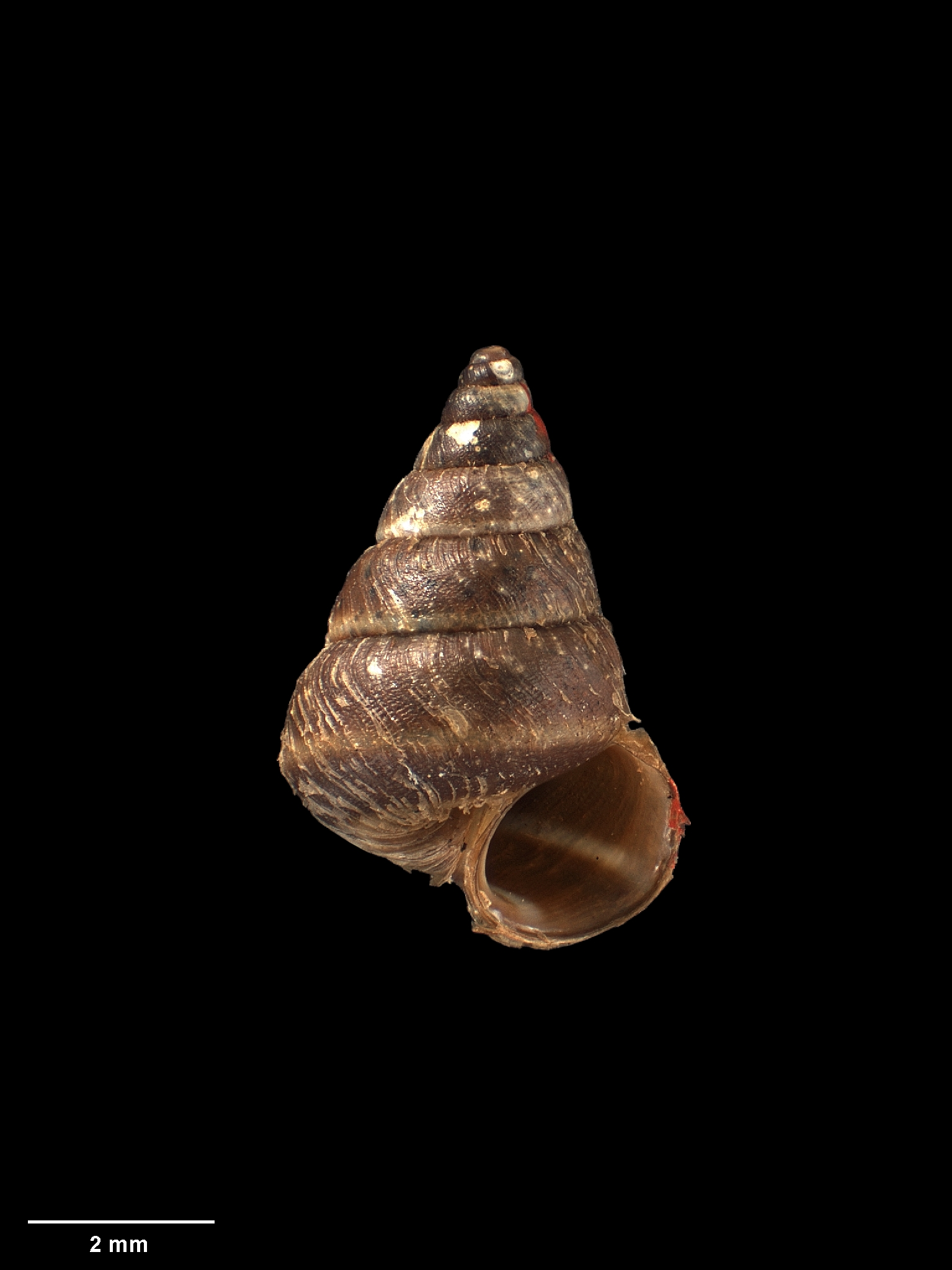

Scientific classification
- Kingdom: Animalia
- Phylum: Mollusca
- Class: Gastropoda
- Subclass: Caenogastropoda
- Order: Architaenioglossa
- Family: Pupinidae
- Genus: Cytora
- Species: C. malleata

Binomial name
- Cytora malleata Marshall & Barker, 2007

= Cytora malleata =

Species of gastropod

Cytora malleata is a species of land snail that is endemic to New Zealand.

== Description ==
The shells grows up to 6.45 millimetres (0.254 in) in height, and have a larger height than width.

== Range ==
The species is found near Whangaruru, which is in Northland, in the North Island.

== Etymology ==
The species is named after the Latin word for "hammered".

== Taxonomy ==
The holotype is stored at the Te Papa Museum under registration number M.179673.

== See also ==
- List of non-marine molluscs of New Zealand
