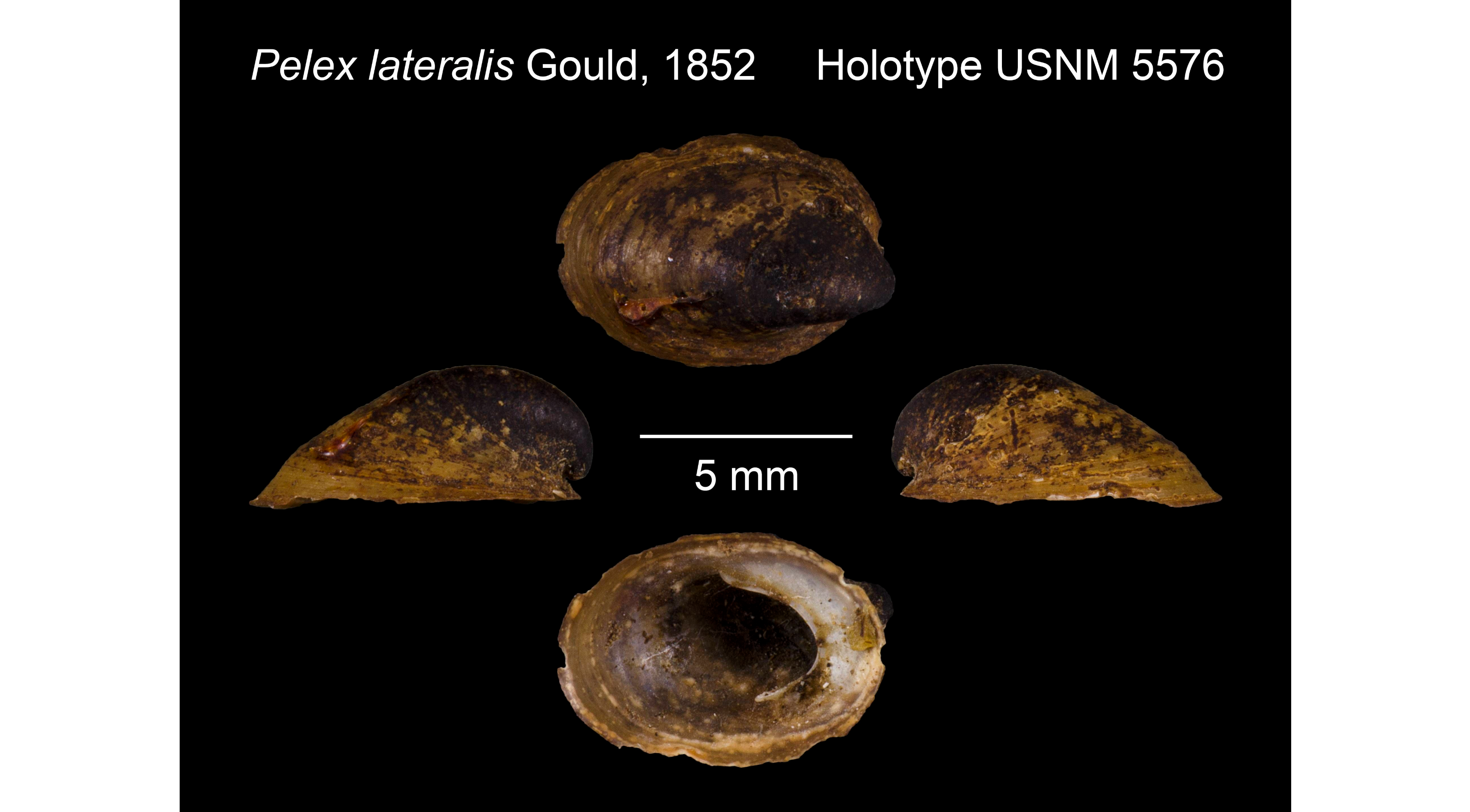

Conservation status
- Data Deficient (IUCN 3.1)

Scientific classification
- Kingdom: Animalia
- Phylum: Mollusca
- Class: Gastropoda
- Superorder: Hygrophila
- Family: Latiidae
- Genus: Latia
- Species: L. lateralis

Binomial name
- Latia lateralis (Gould, 1852)

Synonyms
- Pelex lateralis Gould, 1852

= Latia lateralis =

Species of gastropod

Latia lateralis is a species of small freshwater snail or limpet, an aquatic gastropod mollusc in the family Latiidae.

== Distribution ==
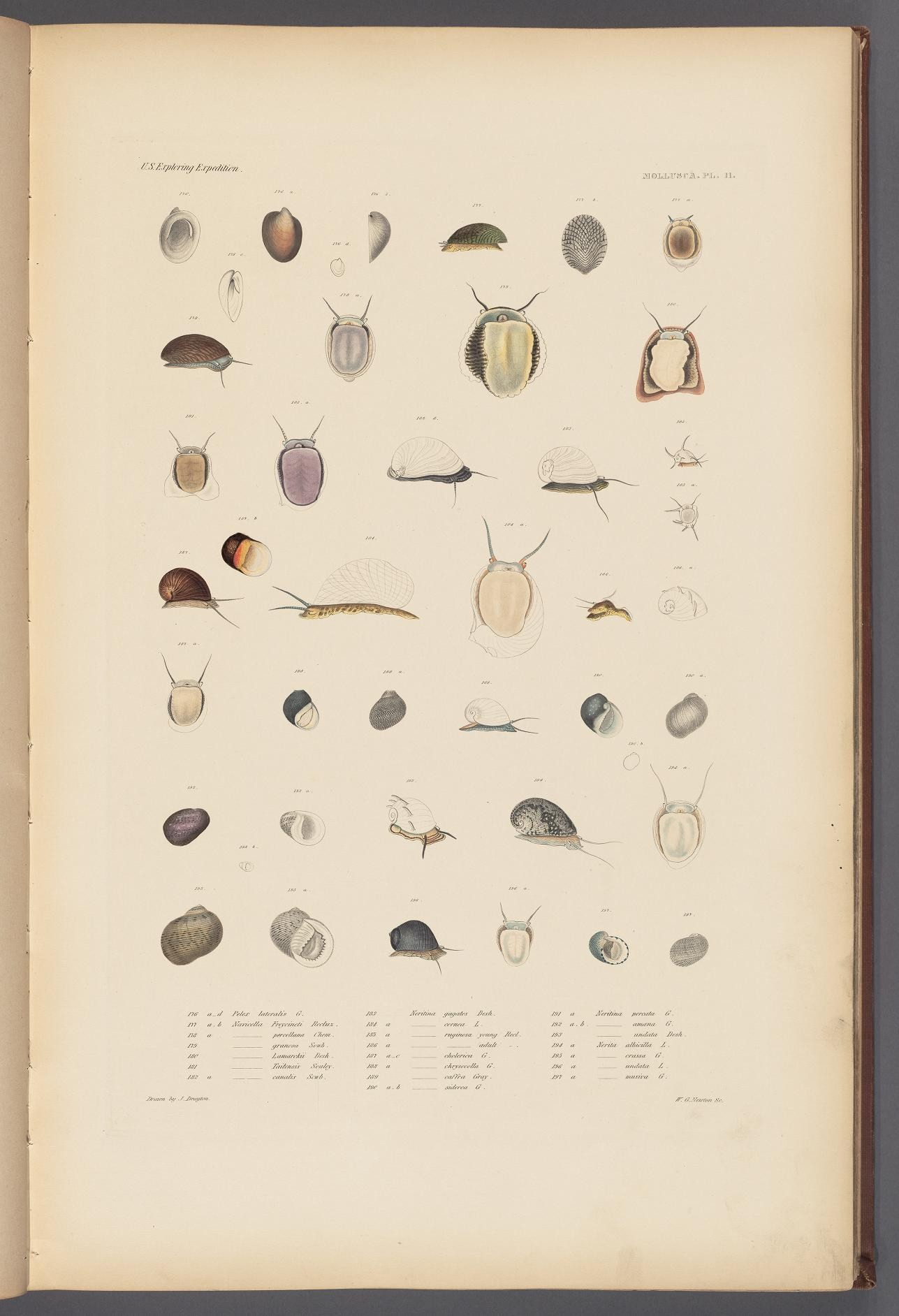
Fig. 176

This species is endemic to the North Island of New Zealand.

== Habitat ==
This limpet lives in clean running streams and rivers.
