= Latia climoi =

Scientific classification
- Kingdom: Animalia
- Phylum: Mollusca
- Class: Gastropoda
- Superorder: Hygrophila
- Family: Latiidae
- Genus: Latia
- Species: L. climoi

Binomial name
- Latia climoi Starobogatov,1986

Species of gastropod

Latia climoi is a species of small freshwater snail or limpet, an aquatic gastropod mollusc in the family Latiidae. It is the holotype of its genus.

There is no fossil record of this species, genus, or family, so there is currently not enough information available to understand its exact evolutionary origins.

== Distribution ==
This species is endemic to the North Island of New Zealand. The holotype was collected from the Hutt River near Wellington. It is not clear from available sources whether this species is found anywhere else in New Zealand.

== Habitat ==
This freshwater limpet is found on the underside of stones in clean-running streams and rivers.

== Life habits ==
These animals have a pallial lung, as do all pulmonate snails, but they also have a false gill or "pseudobranch". This serves as a gill as, in their non-tidal habitat, these limpets never reach the surface for air.

When disturbed, the animal releases a bright green, light-emitting cloud. This is a unique bioluminescence system, but although being studied since 1880, the exact mechanism is still unclear.

These limpets feed upon the surface film covering the rocks on which they live, consisting of algae, bacteria and fungus. Little else is known about their biology.
