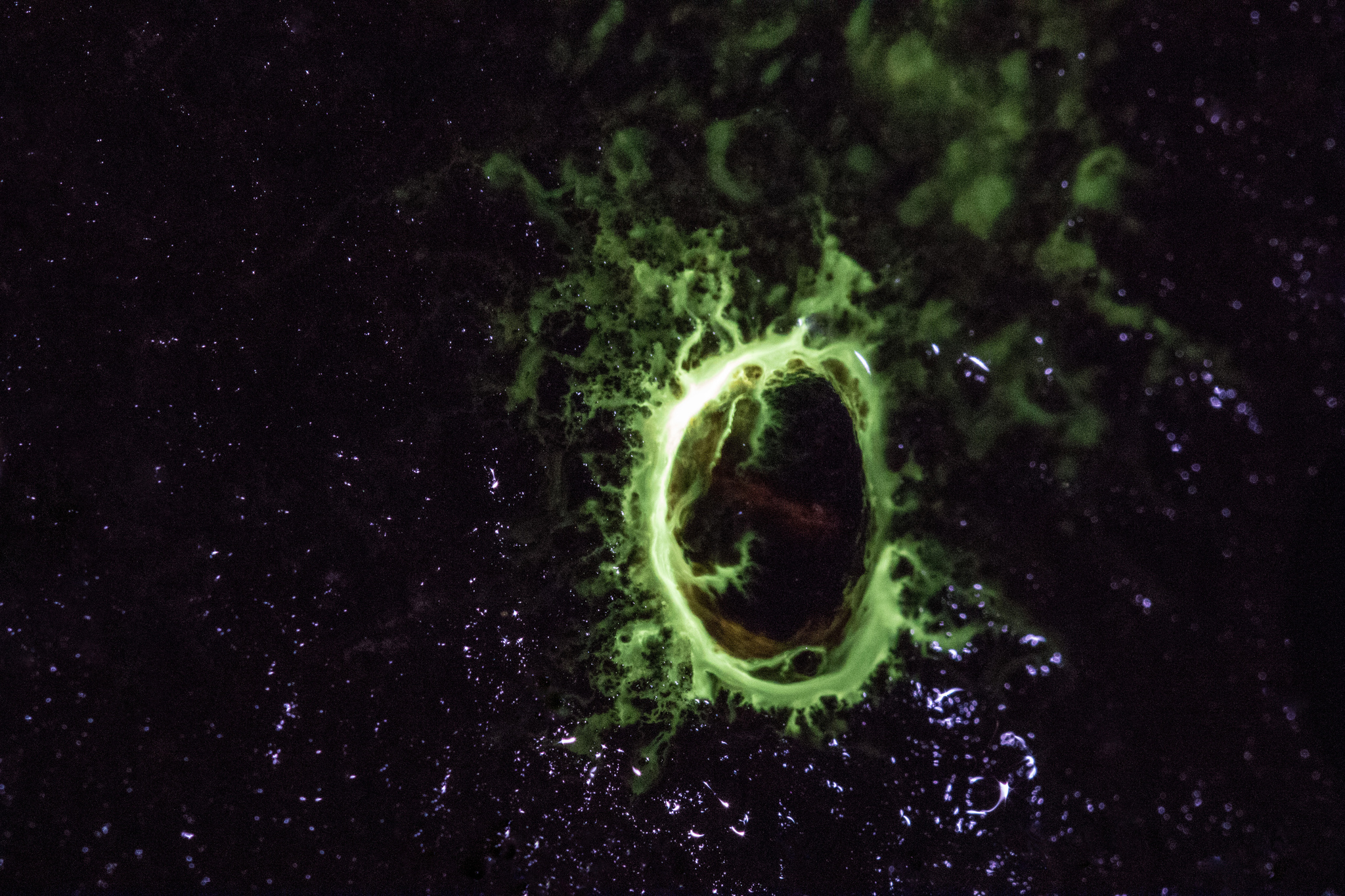
- Latia neritoides bioluminescent slime

Scientific classification
- Kingdom: Animalia
- Phylum: Mollusca
- Class: Gastropoda
- Superorder: Hygrophila
- Family: Latiidae
- Genus: Latia; Gray, 1850 (Note: Gray's paper was read on 11 December 1949, and presumably not published until 1850 notwithstanding the date of the journal.)

Diversity
- one or three extant species, one fossil species

Synonyms
- Pelex Gould, 1852

= Latia =

Genus of gastropods

Latia is a genus of very small, air-breathing freshwater snails or limpets, aquatic pulmonate gastropod molluscs in the superfamily Chilinoidea.

Latia is the only genus in the family Latiidae.

Species in this genus are the only freshwater bioluminescent molluscs in the world.

== Taxonomy ==
The family Latiidae has been classified within the superfamily Chilinoidea, itself belonging to the clade Hygrophila within the informal group Basommatophora in the informal group Pulmonata (according to the taxonomy of the Gastropoda by Bouchet & Rocroi, 2005).

There are no subfamilies in the family Latiidae (according to the taxonomy of the Gastropoda by Bouchet & Rocroi, 2005).

Latia is the only genus in the family Latiidae, in other words Latiidae is a monotypic family and Latia is the type genus of the family Latiidae. This genus was previously placed instead in a larger family of freshwater limpets, the Ancylidae.

== Distribution ==
This genus is endemic to the North Island of New Zealand.

== Habitat ==
This genus lives in clean running streams and rivers.

== Shell description ==
Shell is ancyliform, with the apex marginal, and situated at the left posterior side, incurved, small.

Aperture is very large, oval. The margin of the aperture is thin and sharp; posteriorly with a narrow, thin, concave lamina, its right edge bent down and free, forming a thin and sharp-edged vertical lamella.

== Anatomy ==
This genus is remarkable by the absence of a jaw.

Animal has eyes at the outer bases of the tentacles. The foot is elongated oval. The pulmonary cavity, its opening on the right side. Visceral commissure is long. There is no jaw. Central tooth of radula is bicuspidate, laterals are unicuspidate and marginals are tricuspidate.

== Life habits ==
These freshwater limpets are capable of secreting a bioluminescent substance when disturbed. Theories vary as to the purpose of the bioluminescence, but indicate it is a defence mechanism. One theory is that when disturbed by a predator, Latia release the bioluminescent slime, and the predator chases the light rather than the snail. Another theory is that the slime will attach to the predator causing confusion and alarm, or indeed, making the predator vulnerable and visible to other nocturnal predators. As the Latia release the slime when feeling threatened, it is conceivable Latia could be used as a monitor for illegal pollution dumping or other water quality issues.

== Species ==
Species in the genus Latia include:

- Latia climoi Starobogatov, 1986
- Latia lateralis (Gould, 1852)
- † Latia manuherikia Marshall, 2011 - from the Early–Middle Miocene
- Latia neritoides Gray, 1850 - type species (type by monotypy)
