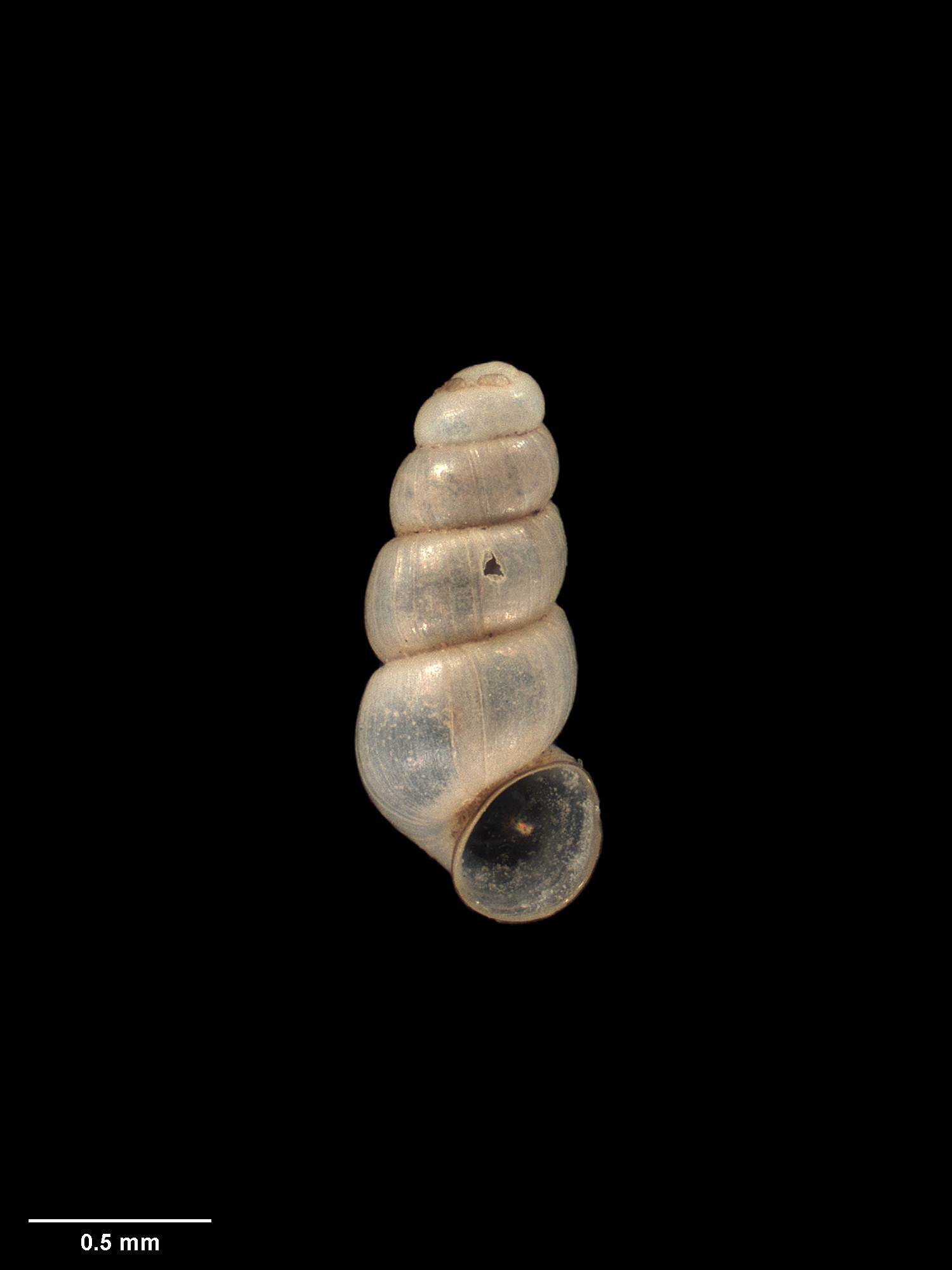

Conservation status
- Nationally Critical (NZ TCS)

Scientific classification
- Kingdom: Animalia
- Phylum: Mollusca
- Class: Gastropoda
- Subclass: Caenogastropoda
- Order: Littorinimorpha
- Family: Tateidae
- Genus: Catapyrgus
- Species: C. sororius

Binomial name
- Catapyrgus sororius Martin Haase, 2008

Synonyms
- Hydrobiidae sp. 38 (M.174165)

= Catapyrgus sororius =

Species of gastropod

Catapyrgus sororius is a critically endangered species of fresh water snail endemic to New Zealand.

== Habitat ==
This snail has only been found in one location, a stream in the Ida Cave in the Oparara River Valley in the Kahurangi National Park. This area is a protected forest reserve managed by the Department of Conservation. Although the population trend of this species is regarded as being stable, the main threats to this snail are pollution events in the stream it inhabits and caving activities.

== Conservation status ==
In November 2018 the Department of Conservation classified Catapyrgus sororius as Nationally Critical under the New Zealand Threat Classification System. The species was judged as meeting the criteria for Nationally Critical threat status as a result of it occupying only in one location, the total area of which is less than one hectare (2.5 acres). It is considered as being Data Poor under that system.
