= Liareinae =

Scientific classification
- Kingdom: Animalia
- Phylum: Mollusca
- Class: Gastropoda
- Subclass: Caenogastropoda
- Order: Architaenioglossa
- Family: Pupinidae
- Subfamily: Liareinae; Powell, 1946

Genera
- See text

Subfamily of gastropods

Liareinae is a taxonomic subfamily of small land snails, terrestrial pulmonate gastropod molluscs in the family Pupinidae.

== Genera ==
Genera within the subfamily Liareinae include:

- Cytora Kobelt and Moellendorff, 1897
- Liarea Pfeiffer, 1853

Genera brought into synonymy

- Murdochia Ancey, 1901: synonym of Cytora Kobelt & Möllendorff, 1897
