= Catapyrgus jami =

Scientific classification
- Kingdom: Animalia
- Phylum: Mollusca
- Class: Gastropoda
- Subclass: Caenogastropoda
- Order: Littorinimorpha
- Family: Tateidae
- Genus: Catapyrgus
- Species: C. jami

Binomial name
- Catapyrgus jami Verhaegen & Haase, 2021

Species of gastropod

Catapyrgus jami is a species of freshwater snail that has only been found at Kahurangi National Park in New Zealand's South Island.

The holotype is stored in Te Papa Museum under registration number M.330187.

The height of the shell attains 1.71mm, its width 1.06mm. It is extremely similar to Catapyrgus matapango from which it differs in the shape of the bursa copulatrix. The name 'jami' comes from the initials of the German composer Jochen A. Modeß.
