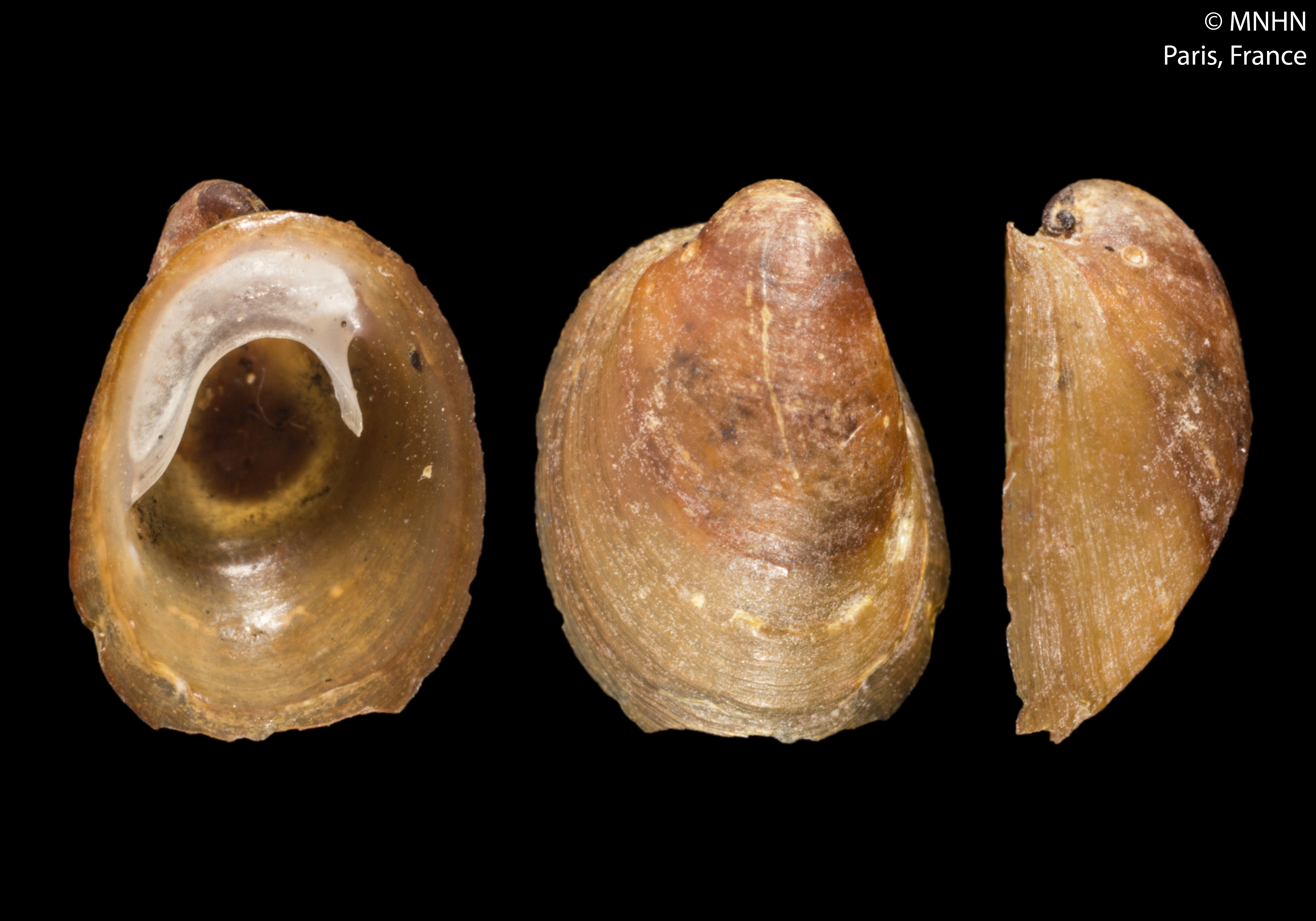
- Latia neritoides shells (syntype at MNHN, Paris)

Conservation status
- Least Concern (IUCN 3.1)

Scientific classification
- Kingdom: Animalia
- Phylum: Mollusca
- Class: Gastropoda
- Superorder: Hygrophila
- Family: Latiidae
- Genus: Latia
- Species: L. neritoides

Binomial name
- Latia neritoides Gray, 1850

Synonyms
- Crepidula neritoides Récluz, 1851; Pelex lateralis Gould, 1852; Latia petitiana Fischer, 1856; Pelex lateralis Fischer, 1856; Latia gassiesiana Fischer, 1856

= Latia neritoides =

Species of gastropod

Latia neritoides is a species of small freshwater snail or limpet, an aquatic gastropod mollusc in the family Latiidae.

The type specimen is in the British Museum.

The specific epithet "neritoides" means "like a nerite". The shell of this species has an internal shelf or lamella, but it more closely resembles a shell of a Crepidula than it does a Nerita.

== Distribution ==
This species is endemic to the North Island of New Zealand.

== Habitat ==
This limpet lives in clean running streams and rivers.

== Shell description ==
The length of the shell is up to 11 mm. The width of the shell is up to 8 mm. The height of the shell is up to 4.5 mm.

If the length of the shell is 8.5 mm, the width of the shell is 6 mm. The height of the shell is 3 mm.

The shell is semiovate, thin and fragile, almost smooth, brown, semitransparent. Sculpture consisting of microscopic rather distant radiate striae, and fine dense concentric growth-lines. Colour pale to dark brown; interior dark brown in the centre, the lamina white. Apex posterior, extending a little beyond the margin, with a spiral nucleus of 1 whorl, visible on the right side. The apex is generally on the left side, but sometimes near the middle of the posterior margin.

The aperture is large, oval, the thin sharp margin generally rounded, but the posterior part of it is occasionally straightened and forming more or less distinct angles with the lateral sides, which themselves may become almost straight. The inside is polished. The lamella has the left attached end near the middle of the left margin, but the right free end does not extend beyond the posterior third of the length of the shell.

== Anatomy ==
The animal has ringed filiform tentacles. The eyes are situated at the outer bases of the tentacles.

The formula of the radula is 30 x 27 + 1 + 27. The central tooth is small and bicuspid. The lateral teeth increasing in size up to the 16th, and then diminish again, they have first 1, then 2, and near the margin 3 cusps. Further details on its morphology and internal anatomy are given in Meyer-Rochow & Moore

== Bioluminescence ==
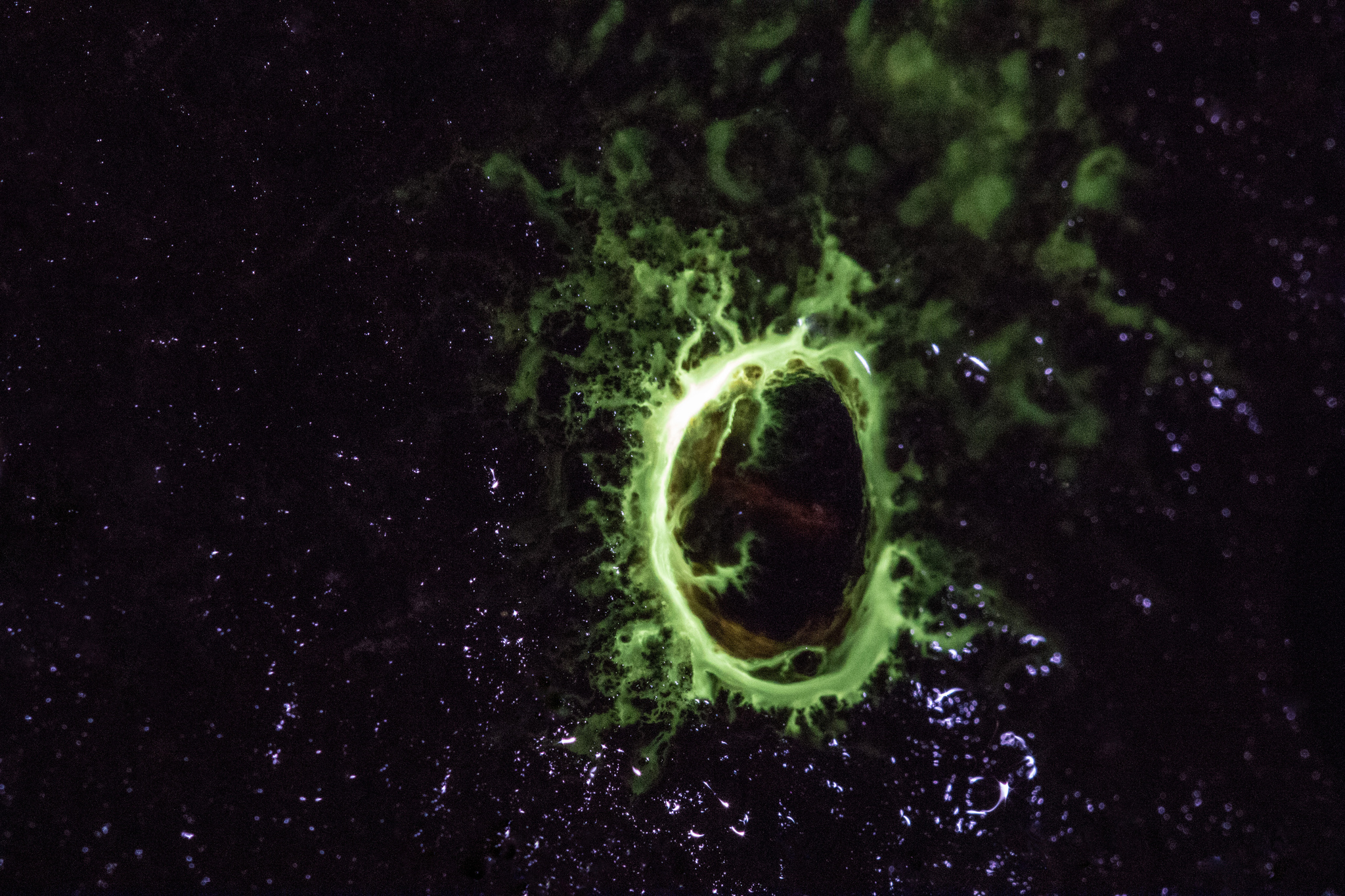
Bioluminescent slime

These animals are bioluminescent and highly phosphorescent. This can easily be seen in the dark by disturbing the animals, or by adding a few drops of alcohol to the water. This is the only known freshwater gastropod that emits light. The light stems from a luminescent slime that is emitted by the snail when it gets disturbed or is attacked by a predator such as a crayfish, an eel, or even a dragonfly nymph. Further details on its ecology and general biology can be found in. Latia luciferin is chemically (E)-2-methyl-4-(2,6,6-trimethyl-1-cyclohex-1-yl)-1-buten-1-ol formate.

The chemical reaction is like this:

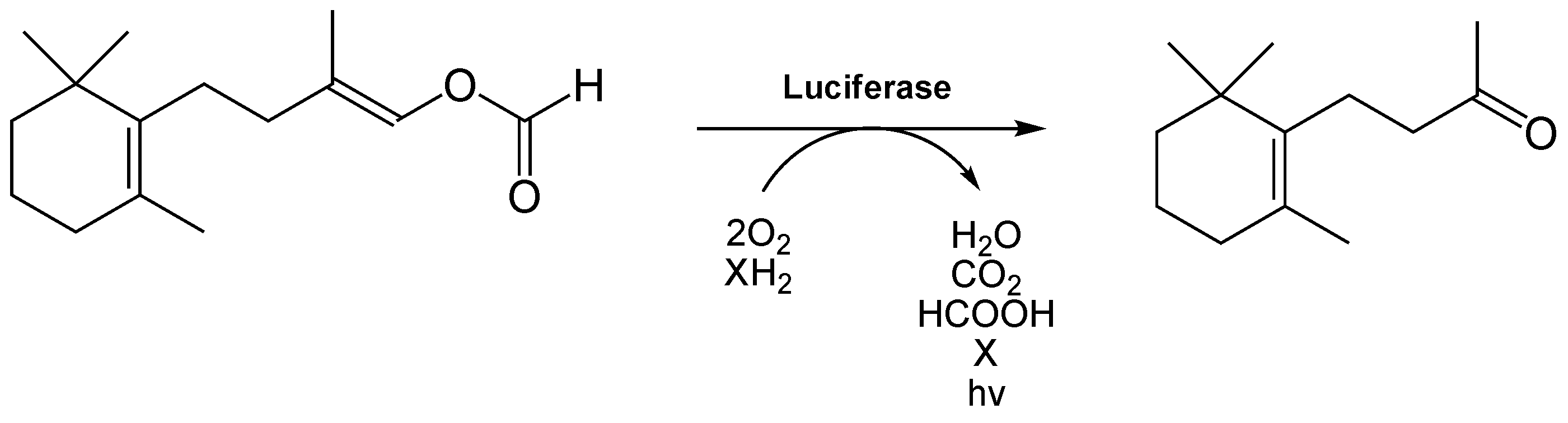
Latia luciferin reaction

XH_{2} is a reducing agent. The reaction is catalyzed by the enzyme luciferase and a purple protein.

== See also ==
- Quantula striata, the only known terrestrial gastropod that emits light.
