= Cytora kamura =

Scientific classification
- Kingdom: Animalia
- Phylum: Mollusca
- Class: Gastropoda
- Subclass: Caenogastropoda
- Order: Architaenioglossa
- Family: Pupinidae
- Genus: Cytora
- Species: C. kamura

Binomial name
- Cytora kamura Marshall & Barker, 2007

Species of gastropod

Cytora kamura is a species of land snail that is endemic to New Zealand.

== Description ==
The width of the shell grows up to 3.5–3.88 millimetres (0.138–0.153 in) and has a larger width than height, with a height/width ratio of 0.78–0.97. This species was previously misidentified as Cytora lignaria.

== Range ==
The species is found on both the southern North Island and the northern South Island.

== Etymology ==
The species was named after the Māori word for carpenter, as a reference to the fact that it was previously misidentified as Cytora lignaria, where 'lignaria' is Latin for 'carpenter'.

== See also ==
- List of non-marine molluscs of New Zealand
