= Cytora fasciata =

Scientific classification
- Kingdom: Animalia
- Phylum: Mollusca
- Class: Gastropoda
- Subclass: Caenogastropoda
- Order: Architaenioglossa
- Family: Pupinidae
- Genus: Cytora
- Species: C. fasciata

Binomial name
- Cytora fasciata (Suter, 1894)

Synonyms
- Lagochilus fasciatum Suter, 1894

Species of gastropod

Cytora fasciata is a species of very small land snails with an operculum, terrestrial gastropod molluscs in the family Pupinidae.

== Distribution ==
This species occur in New Zealand.
