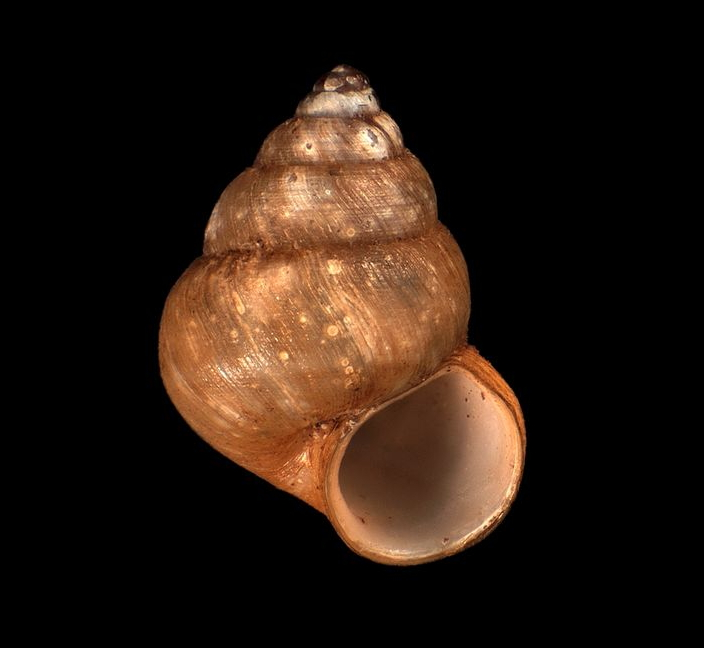
- Shell of Cytora septentrionalis (specimen at the Museum of New Zealand)

Scientific classification
- Kingdom: Animalia
- Phylum: Mollusca
- Class: Gastropoda
- Subclass: Caenogastropoda
- Order: Architaenioglossa
- Family: Pupinidae
- Genus: Cytora
- Species: C. septentrionalis

Binomial name
- Cytora septentrionalis (Suter, 1907)

Synonyms
- Lagochilus chiltoni septentrionale Suter, 1907

= Cytora septentrionalis =

Species of gastropod

Cytora septentrionalis is a species of very small land snails with an operculum, terrestrial gastropod molluscs in the family Pupinidae.

== Distribution ==
This species occur in New Zealand.
