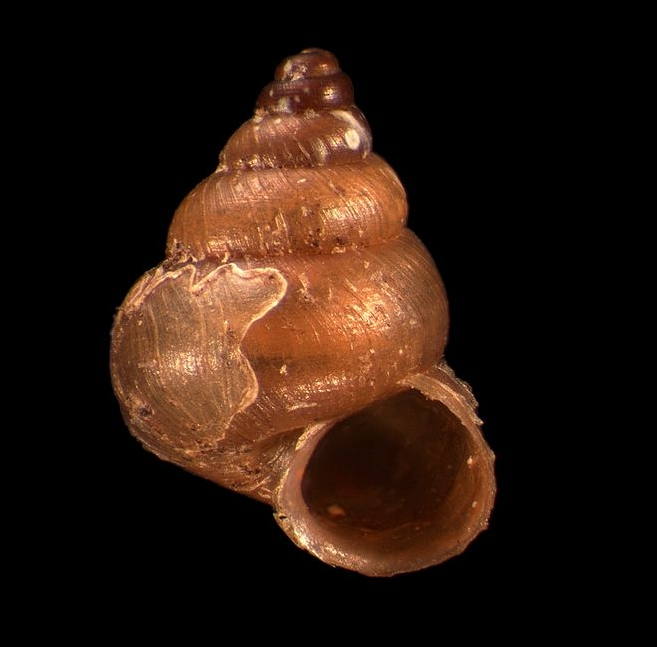
- Shell of Cytora chiltoni (holotype at the Museum of New Zealand)

Scientific classification
- Kingdom: Animalia
- Phylum: Mollusca
- Class: Gastropoda
- Subclass: Caenogastropoda
- Order: Architaenioglossa
- Family: Pupinidae
- Subfamily: Liareinae
- Genus: Cytora
- Species: C. chiltoni

Binomial name
- Cytora chiltoni (Suter, 1896)

Synonyms
- Japonia (Cytora) chiltoni (Suter, 1896) (superseded combination); Lagochilus chiltoni Suter, 1896

= Cytora chiltoni =

Species of gastropod

Cytora chiltoni is a species of very small land snails with an operculum, terrestrial gastropod molluscs in the family Pupinidae.

== Description ==
The length of the shell attains 3 mm, its diameter 2.25 mm.

(Original description) The shell is very small, turbinate, subperforate, rufous, slightly glossy, thin and semi-transparent. It shows rather close longitudinal membranous white ribs, which easily rub off. They are nearly equidistant, five to six per millimetre.

The spire is conical with a rather pointed apex. The periphery is rounded. The shell contains 5 convex whorls, the first three increasing slowly, the others more rapidly. They are faintly microscopically spirally striated. The body whorl is about two-thirds of the total height. The suture is impressed. The aperture is subcircular and slightly oblique. The peristome is simple and straight. The notch at the suture is very slightly indicated. The columellar lip is somewhat callous. It is expanded and covers completely the small umbilicus. The margins are convergent, not united, by a callus. The base of the shell is rounded. The operculum is not seen.

== Distribution ==
This species were found in the Buller River Valley, New Zealand.
