= Odostomia murdochi =

Scientific classification
- Kingdom: Animalia
- Phylum: Mollusca
- Class: Gastropoda
- Family: Pyramidellidae
- Genus: Odostomia
- Species: O. murdochi

Binomial name
- Odostomia murdochi Suter, 1913

Species of gastropod

Odostomia murdochi is a species of sea snail, a marine gastropod mollusk in the family Pyramidellidae, the pyrams and their allies.
