= Conus armoricus =

Conus armoricus Temporal range: Late Miocene

Scientific classification
- Kingdom: Animalia
- Phylum: Mollusca
- Class: Gastropoda
- Subclass: Caenogastropoda
- Order: Neogastropoda
- Superfamily: Conoidea
- Family: Conidae
- Genus: Conus
- Species: C. armoricus

Binomial name
- Conus armoricus Suter, 1917

Species of sea snail

Conus armoricus is an extinct species of sea snail, a marine gastropod mollusk in the family Conidae, the cone snails, cone shells or cones.

== Distribution ==
This species is from Miocene-aged marine environments of New Zealand.
