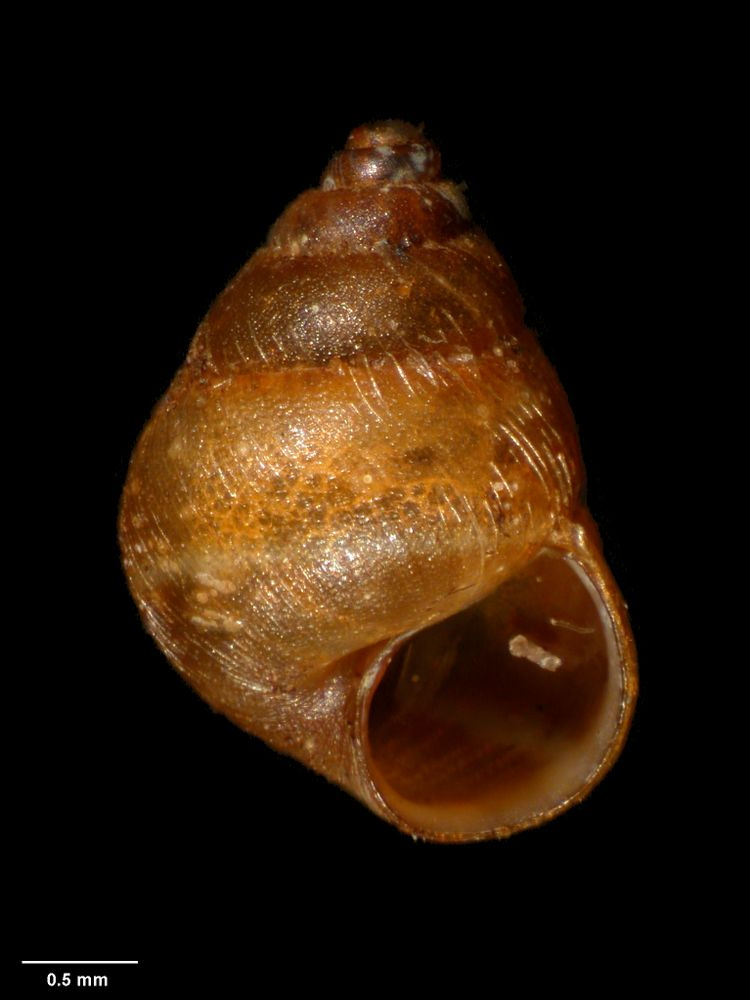

Scientific classification
- Kingdom: Animalia
- Phylum: Mollusca
- Class: Gastropoda
- Subclass: Caenogastropoda
- Order: Architaenioglossa
- Family: Pupinidae
- Genus: Cytora
- Species: C. goulstonei

Binomial name
- Cytora goulstonei Marshall & Barker, 2007

= Cytora goulstonei =

Species of gastropod

Cytora goulstonei is a species of land snail that is endemic to New Zealand.

== Description ==
The shell grows up to a height of 3.7 millimetres (0.15 in), and has a larger height than width, with a height/width ratio of 1.22–1.39.

== Range ==
Cytora goulstonei is only found in the Northland Region, in the area around the Waipoua Forest and Mangōnui. The species is found up to an elevation of approximately 330 metres (1,080 ft).

== Etymology ==
The species is named after James Frederick Goulstone.

== Taxonomy ==
The holotype is stored at the Te Papa Museum under registration number M.164803.

== See also ==
- List of non-marine molluscs of New Zealand
