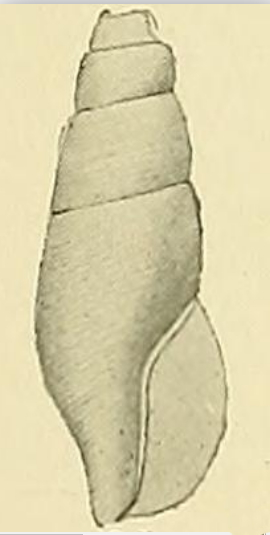
- Shell of Aoteatilia tenuistriata (holotypeà

Scientific classification
- Kingdom: Animalia
- Phylum: Mollusca
- Class: Gastropoda
- Subclass: Caenogastropoda
- Order: Neogastropoda
- Superfamily: Buccinoidea
- Family: Columbellidae
- Genus: Aoteatilia
- Species: A. tenuistriata

Binomial name
- Aoteatilia tenuistriata (Suter, 1908)

Synonyms
- Daphnella tenuistriata Suter, 1908 (original combination)

= Aoteatilia tenuistriata =

Species of gastropod

Aoteatilia tenuistriata is a species of sea snail, a marine gastropod mollusk in the family Columbellidae.

== Description ==
The height of three whorls without protoconch is 5 mm, with it probably about 6 mm; its diameter is 2 mm.

(Original description) The very small shell is subulate, thin and fragile and minutely spirally striate.

The sculpture consists of very fine, dense, and equal spiral striae from the protoconch down to the base, the former most likely smooth. Its colour is flavescent to fulvous, the protoconch purple.

The spire is elevated, conic, somewhat higher than the aperture. The outlines are faintly convex. The protoconch is broken off in all the four specimens at disposal. The shell contains 5 to 6 whorls, lightly convex and rather rapidly increasing. The base of the shell is contracted. The suture is linear and well impressed. The aperture is subrhomboidal, the sides parallel, angled above, with a short, broad, and slightly emarginate siphonal canal below. The outer lip is moderately convex, acutely curved, and sometimes a little contracted below, sharp, with a shallow, broad sinus below the suture. The columella is vertical, straight and excavated on meeting the faintly convex parietal wall. The inner lip is thin and very narrow.

== Distribution ==
This marine species is endemic to New Zealand and occurs off Snares Islands at a depth of 90 m.
