= Hedleya macleayi =

Conservation status
- Vulnerable (IUCN 2.3)

Scientific classification
- Kingdom: Animalia
- Phylum: Mollusca
- Class: Gastropoda
- Subclass: Caenogastropoda
- Order: Architaenioglossa
- Superfamily: Cyclophoroidea
- Family: Pupinidae
- Genus: Hedleya
- Species: H. macleayi

Binomial name
- Hedleya macleayi Cox, 1892

Species of gastropod

Hedleya macleayi is an operculate species of land snail in the family Pupinidae and the superfamily Cyclophoridae.

This species is endemic to Australia.
