= Cytora cytora =

Scientific classification
- Kingdom: Animalia
- Phylum: Mollusca
- Class: Gastropoda
- Subclass: Caenogastropoda
- Order: Architaenioglossa
- Family: Pupinidae
- Genus: Cytora
- Species: C. cytora

Binomial name
- Cytora cytora (Gray, 1850)

Synonyms
- Cyclophorus cytora Gray, 1850

Species of gastropod

Cytora cytora is a species of very small land snails with an operculum, terrestrial gastropod molluscs in the family Pupinidae.

== Distribution ==
This species occurs in New Zealand.
