= Conus fusellinus =

Conus fusellinus Temporal range: Miocene

Scientific classification
- Kingdom: Animalia
- Phylum: Mollusca
- Class: Gastropoda
- Subclass: Caenogastropoda
- Order: Neogastropoda
- Superfamily: Conoidea
- Family: Conidae
- Genus: Conus
- Species: C. fusellinus

Binomial name
- Conus fusellinus Suter, 1917

Species of sea snail

Conus fusellinus is a fossil species of sea snail, a marine gastropod mollusk in the family Conidae, the cone snails, cone shells or cones.

== Distribution ==
This marine species of cone snail occurs as a fossil in the Miocene of New Zealand.
