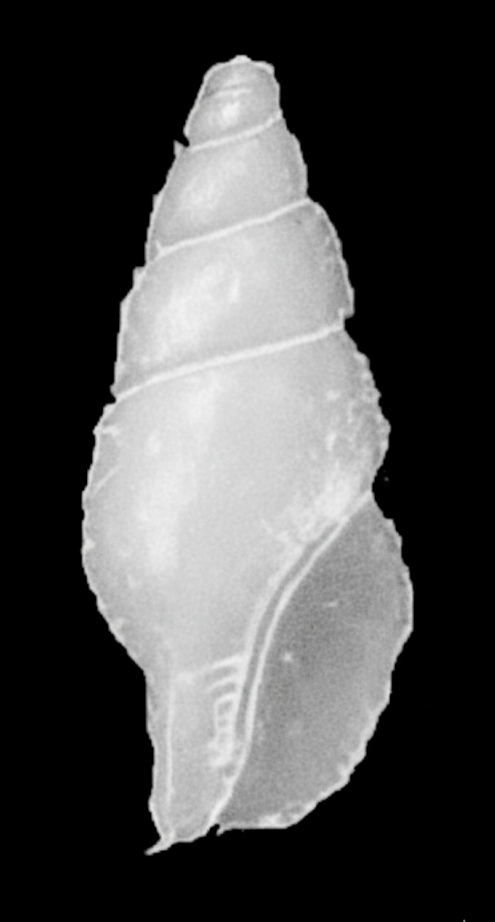
- Shell of Aoteatilia amphipsila

Scientific classification
- Kingdom: Animalia
- Phylum: Mollusca
- Class: Gastropoda
- Subclass: Caenogastropoda
- Order: Neogastropoda
- Superfamily: Buccinoidea
- Family: Columbellidae
- Genus: Aoteatilia
- Species: A. amphipsila

Binomial name
- Aoteatilia amphipsila (Suter, 1908)

Synonyms
- Daphnella amphipsila Suter, 1908 (original combination)

= Aoteatilia amphipsila =

Species of gastropod

Aoteatilia amphipsila is a species of sea snail, a marine gastropod mollusk in the family Columbellidae.

== Description ==
The length of the shell attains 3.5 mm.

(Original description) The shell is very small, narrowly fusiform, thin, and translucent white. Its sculpture consists of several spiral striae on the base and a few indistinct, microscopic spiral lines on the whorls. The growth lines are very fine and dense. The overall color is a white, vitreous hue.

The spire is conic, with straight outlines, and is a little higher than the aperture. The protoconch is mamillary, comprising two smooth whorls, with a minute nucleus and a slightly swollen succeeding whorl. There are five whorls in total, which increase regularly in size and are lightly convex. The base is contracted. The suture is linear.

The aperture is subrhomboidal, with subparallel sides. It is angled at the top and produced below into a somewhat oblique, but distinct, short, broad, and truncated siphonal canal. The outer lip is moderately convex, straightened in the middle, and contracted below, with a smooth interior. The columella is straight, excavated toward the flat parietal wall, and lightly curved below toward the margin of the siphonal canal. The inner lip is thin, narrow, and smooth.

== Distribution ==
This marine species is endemic to new Zealand and occurs off Snares Islands.
