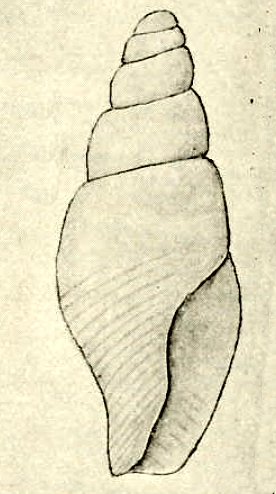
- Shell of Aoteatilia psila (holotype)

Scientific classification
- Kingdom: Animalia
- Phylum: Mollusca
- Class: Gastropoda
- Subclass: Caenogastropoda
- Order: Neogastropoda
- Superfamily: Buccinoidea
- Family: Columbellidae
- Genus: Aoteatilia
- Species: A. psila

Binomial name
- Aoteatilia psila (Suter, 1908)

Synonyms
- Daphnella psila Suter, 1908 (original combination)

= Aoteatilia psila =

Species of gastropod

Aoteatilia psila is a species of sea snail, a marine gastropod mollusk in the family Columbellidae.

== Description ==
The length of the shell attains 6 mm, its diameter 2.5 mm.

(Original description) The very small, white shell is fusiform, thin, almost smooth, but the base is distinctly spirally striate

The sculpture: Excessively fine microscopic striae are present on all whorls, those of the protoconch excepted, crossed by fine dense straight growth lines. The body whorl shows broad flat equidistant about 20 spiral ribs with narrow linear interstices. They are distinct at the base, but more or less effaced on the upper part of the whorl.

The colour of the shell is light-yellowish-white.

The spire is elevated-conic, with a blunt apex, a little higher than the aperture. The outlines are straight. The protoconch consists of 1½ smooth and polished whorls, the nucleus broadly rounded. The spire contains 5 whorls, regularly increasing and very flatly convex. The base of the shell is lightly contracted. The suture is moderately impressed. The aperture is slightly oblique, high and narrow, its sides subparallel, angled above, with a short broad and truncated siphonal canal below. The outer lip is thin and sharp, gently curved above, broadly rounded below. The columella is vertical, smooth, straight, but bent to the left below. The inner lip is very narrow, extending over the lightly excavated parietal wall.

== Distribution ==
This marine species is endemic to New Zealand and occurs off Three Kings Islands and Northland.
