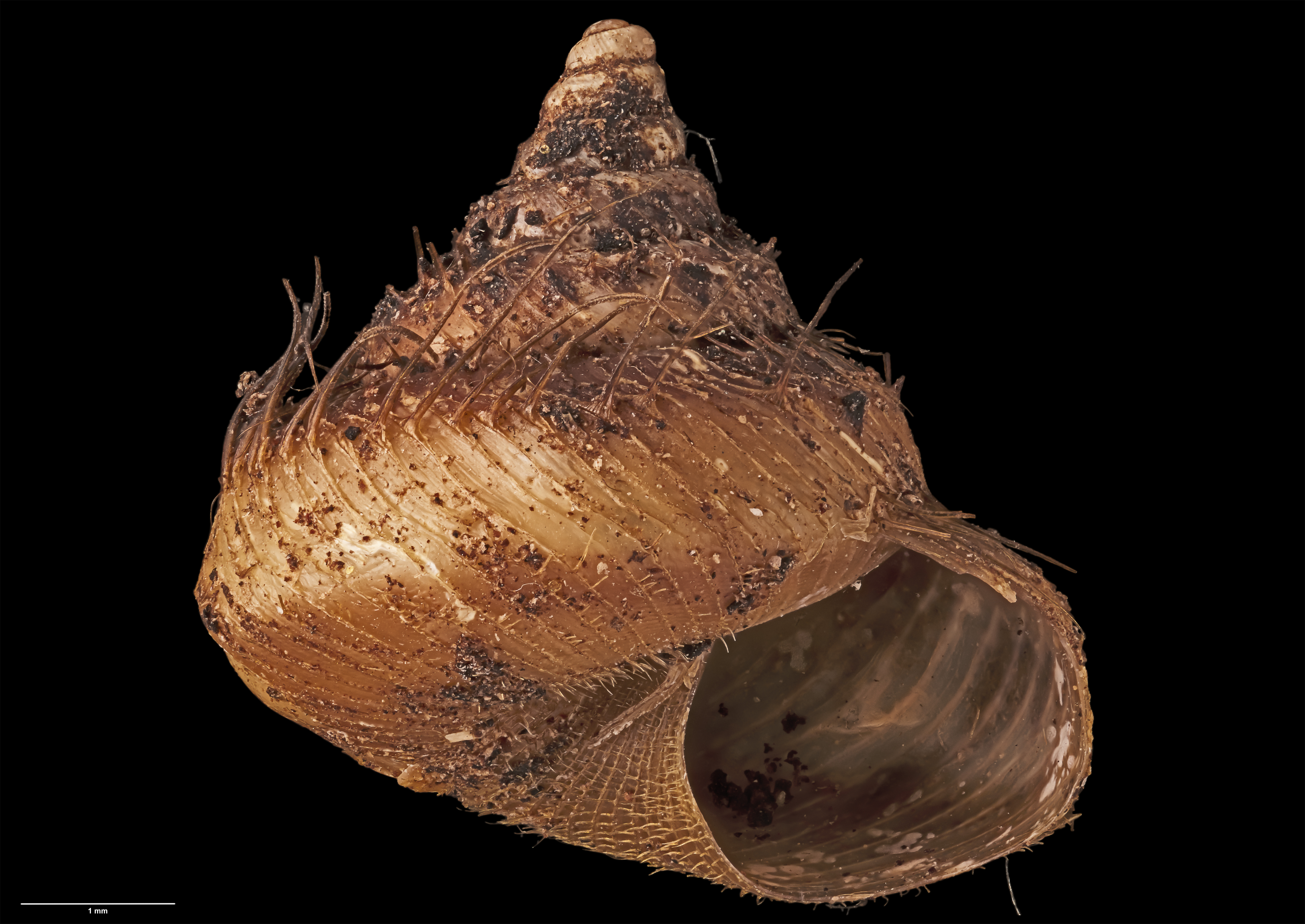

Conservation status
- Data Deficient (IUCN 2.3)

Scientific classification
- Kingdom: Animalia
- Phylum: Mollusca
- Class: Gastropoda
- Subclass: Caenogastropoda
- Order: Architaenioglossa
- Family: Pupinidae
- Genus: Cytora
- Species: C. hirsutissima

Binomial name
- Cytora hirsutissima (Powell, 1951)

Synonyms
- Murdochia hirsutissima Powell, 1951

= Cytora hirsutissima =

Species of gastropod

Cytora hirsutissima is a species of very small land snails with an operculum, terrestrial gastropod molluscs in the family Pupinidae.

== Distribution ==
This species occurs in New Zealand. It is classified under the New Zealand Threat Classification System as Nationally Critical.
