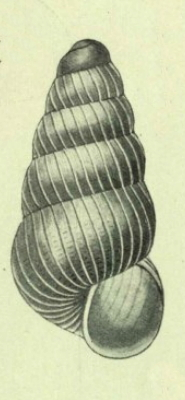
- Shell of Cytora aranea (holotype)

Scientific classification
- Kingdom: Animalia
- Phylum: Mollusca
- Class: Gastropoda
- Subclass: Caenogastropoda
- Order: Architaenioglossa
- Family: Pupinidae
- Genus: Cytora
- Species: C. aranea

Binomial name
- Cytora aranea (Powell, 1928)

Synonyms
- Murdochia aranea Powell, 1928

= Cytora aranea =

Species of gastropod

Cytora aranea is a species of very small land snails with an operculum, terrestrial gastropod molluscs in the family Pupinidae.

== Distribution ==
This species occurs in New Zealand.
