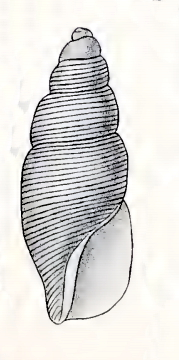
- Original image of a shell of Aoteatilia substriata

Scientific classification
- Kingdom: Animalia
- Phylum: Mollusca
- Class: Gastropoda
- Subclass: Caenogastropoda
- Order: Neogastropoda
- Superfamily: Buccinoidea
- Family: Columbellidae
- Genus: Aoteatilia
- Species: A. substriata

Binomial name
- Aoteatilia substriata (Suter, 1899)

Synonyms
- Daphnella substriata Suter, 1899; Mitromorpha substriata (Suter, 1899)

= Aoteatilia substriata =

Species of gastropod

Aoteatilia substriata is a species of sea snail, a marine gastropod mollusk in the family Columbellidae.

== Description ==
The length of the shell attains 5.5 mm, its diameter 2.25 mm.

(Original description) The small, thin and fragile shell has a mitriform shape. it is white with a violet apex, finely spirally striated. The sculpture consists of delicate equal and numerous fine spiral striae, extending over the whole shell except the protoconch. The spiral below the suture is a little stronger than the others; frequent inequidistant faint growth periods form the only axial sculpture. The colour of the shell is whitish, the protoconch light violet. The spire is elevated, conic, about 1½ times the height of the aperture. The protoconch consists of 1¾ whorls, smooth, globose, the nucleus flatly convex, slightly lateral. The shell contains 6 whorls, regularly increasing, moderately convex. The base of the shell is slightly contracted. The suture is not deep, margined by the spirals. The aperture is very little oblique, subrhomboidal, angled above, produced below into a very short broad recurved siphonal canal, its base lightly emarginate. The outer lip is regularly convex, somewhat thickened inside, minutely crenate. The columella is vertical, slightly arcuate, excavated on meeting the parietal wall, twisted below with a slightly raised edge. The inner lip is thin and narrow, smooth. The operculum is unknown.

== Distribution ==
This marine species is endemic to New Zealand and occurs off Foyaux Strait, North Island.
