= Pupinella frednaggsi =

Scientific classification
- Domain: Eukaryota
- Kingdom: Animalia
- Phylum: Mollusca
- Class: Gastropoda
- Subclass: Caenogastropoda
- Order: Architaenioglossa
- Superfamily: Cyclophoroidea
- Family: Pupinidae
- Genus: Pupinella
- Species: P. frednaggsi

Binomial name
- Pupinella frednaggsi Thach & Huber, 2017

Species of gastropod

Pupinella frednaggsi is a species of pulmonate gastropod in the family Pupinidae from the regions surrounding Luang Phrabang, in Central Laos.

This species is known only from the type locality, in Tam Phatok Cave, Ngoy District, Luang Phrabang Province.
