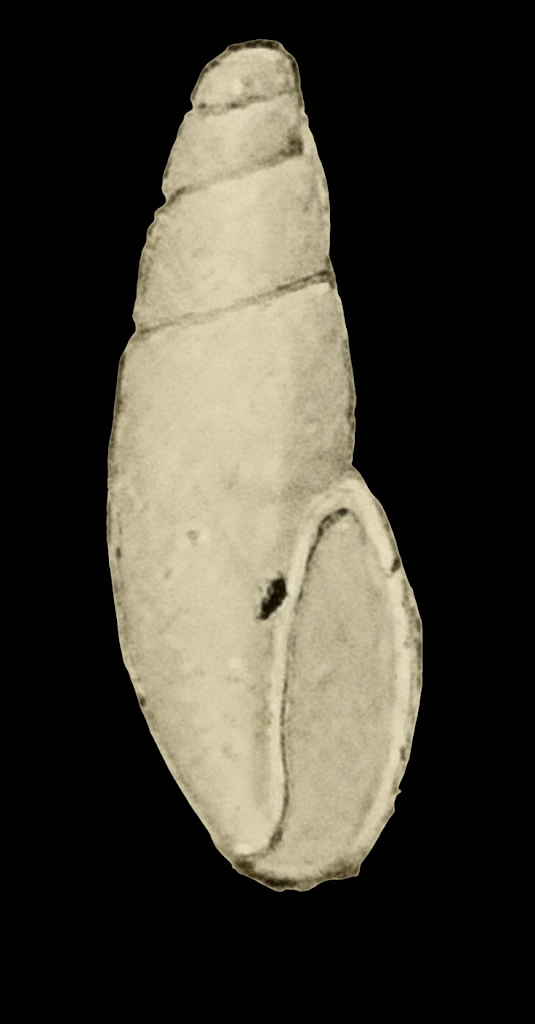
- Shell of Aoteatilia acicula

Scientific classification
- Kingdom: Animalia
- Phylum: Mollusca
- Class: Gastropoda
- Subclass: Caenogastropoda
- Order: Neogastropoda
- Superfamily: Buccinoidea
- Family: Columbellidae
- Genus: Aoteatilia
- Species: A. acicula

Binomial name
- Aoteatilia acicula (Suter, 1908)

Synonyms
- Daphnella acicula Suter, 1908 (original combination)

= Aoteatilia acicula =

Species of gastropod

Aoteatilia acicula is a species of sea snail, a marine gastropod mollusk in the family Columbellidae.

== Description ==
The length of the shell attains 3.5 mm, its diameter 1.3 mm.

(Original description) The shell is minute and acicular, with the body whorl being very high and spirally striate. The sculpture consists of equally fine spiral threads with linear grooves between them, found only on the body whorl and being more distinct on the base. The color is a pale yellow, with a purple protoconch.

The spire is subcylindrical with faintly convex outlines, and is slightly higher than the aperture. The protoconch is comparatively large and papillate, consisting of one and a half smooth whorls. The nucleus is oblique and broadly rounded.

There are four whorls in total, with the last two increasing very rapidly. They are faintly convex and very little attenuated toward the base. The suture is linear.

The aperture is high and triangular, narrowly angled at the top, and has a broad, rudimentary siphonal canal below. The outer lip is sharp, slightly thickened, and somewhat convex. It has a broad, shallow sinus at the suture, from which it advances in a broad curve toward the base. The inside of the outer lip is smooth. The columella is oblique, forming a straight line up and over the parietal wall. The inner lip is very thin and inconspicuous.

== Distribution ==
This marine species is endemic to New Zealand and occurs off Snares Islands, Stewart Island and Chatham Islands.
