= Cytora filicosta =

Conservation status
- Naturally Uncommon (NZ TCS)

Scientific classification
- Kingdom: Animalia
- Phylum: Mollusca
- Class: Gastropoda
- Subclass: Caenogastropoda
- Order: Architaenioglossa
- Family: Pupinidae
- Genus: Cytora
- Species: C. filicosta

Binomial name
- Cytora filicosta (Powell, 1948 )

Synonyms
- Murdochia filicosta Powell, 1948

Species of gastropod

Cytora filicosta is a species of very small land snails with an operculum, terrestrial gastropod molluscs in the family Pupinidae.

== Distribution ==
This species occur in New Zealand.
