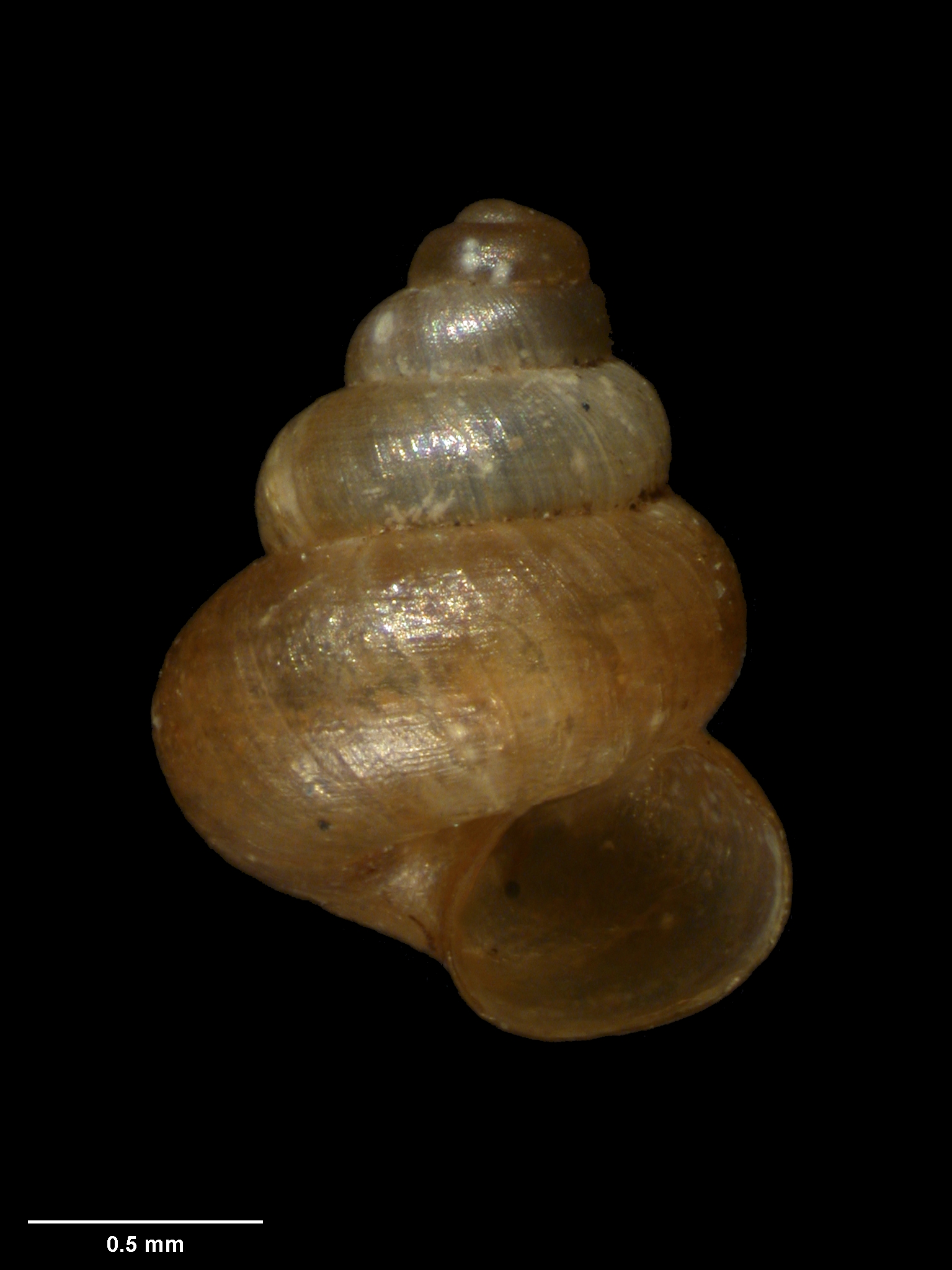
- Holotype specimen

Conservation status
- Naturally Uncommon (NZ TCS)

Scientific classification
- Kingdom: Animalia
- Phylum: Mollusca
- Class: Gastropoda
- Subclass: Caenogastropoda
- Order: Architaenioglossa
- Family: Pupinidae
- Genus: Cytora
- Species: C. rakiura

Binomial name
- Cytora rakiura Marshall & Barker, 2007

= Cytora rakiura =

Species of gastropod

Cytora rakiura is a species of very small land snail in the family Pupinidae. It is endemic to New Zealand.

== Taxonomy ==
This species was described in 2007 by Bruce Marshall and Gary Barker from numerous specimens collected on Stewart Island including Ulva Island. The species name is in reference to Stewart Island.

The holotype is stored at Te Papa Museum under the registration number M.030684.

== Description ==
The shell is 1.7 to 2mm in length when fully grown. It is coloured yellowish brown.

== Distribution and habitat ==
This species is only known from Stewart Island in New Zealand. It is a leaf litter dwelling detritivore that occurs in lowland broadleaved-conifer forests

== Conservation status ==
Under the New Zealand Threat Classification System, this species is listed as Naturally Uncommon with the qualifiers of "Range Restricted".
