= Pupinella masuhowaruensis =

Scientific classification
- Domain: Eukaryota
- Kingdom: Animalia
- Phylum: Mollusca
- Class: Gastropoda
- Subclass: Caenogastropoda
- Order: Architaenioglossa
- Superfamily: Cyclophoroidea
- Family: Pupinidae
- Genus: Pupinella
- Species: P. masuhowaruensis

Binomial name
- Pupinella masuhowaruensis Ueng & Chiou, 2004

Species of gastropod

Pupinella masuhowaruensis is a species of pulmonate gastropod in the family Pupinidae from the mountains of Taiwan.

This species has been recorded formally only from the type locality at 1500 m a.s.l. in Masuhowaru Village, Taoyuan District, Kaohsiung County of Southern Taiwan.
