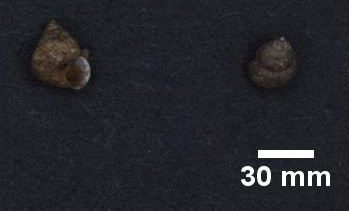
- Preserved Cytora pallida shells from 1904

Scientific classification
- Kingdom: Animalia
- Phylum: Mollusca
- Class: Gastropoda
- Subclass: Caenogastropoda
- Order: Architaenioglossa
- Family: Pupinidae
- Genus: Cytora
- Species: C. pallida

Binomial name
- Cytora pallida (Hutton, 1883)

Synonyms
- Leptopoma pallida Hutton, 1883

= Cytora pallida =

Species of gastropod

Cytora pallida is a species of very small land snails with an operculum, terrestrial gastropod molluscs in the family Pupinidae.

== Distribution ==
This species occur in New Zealand.
