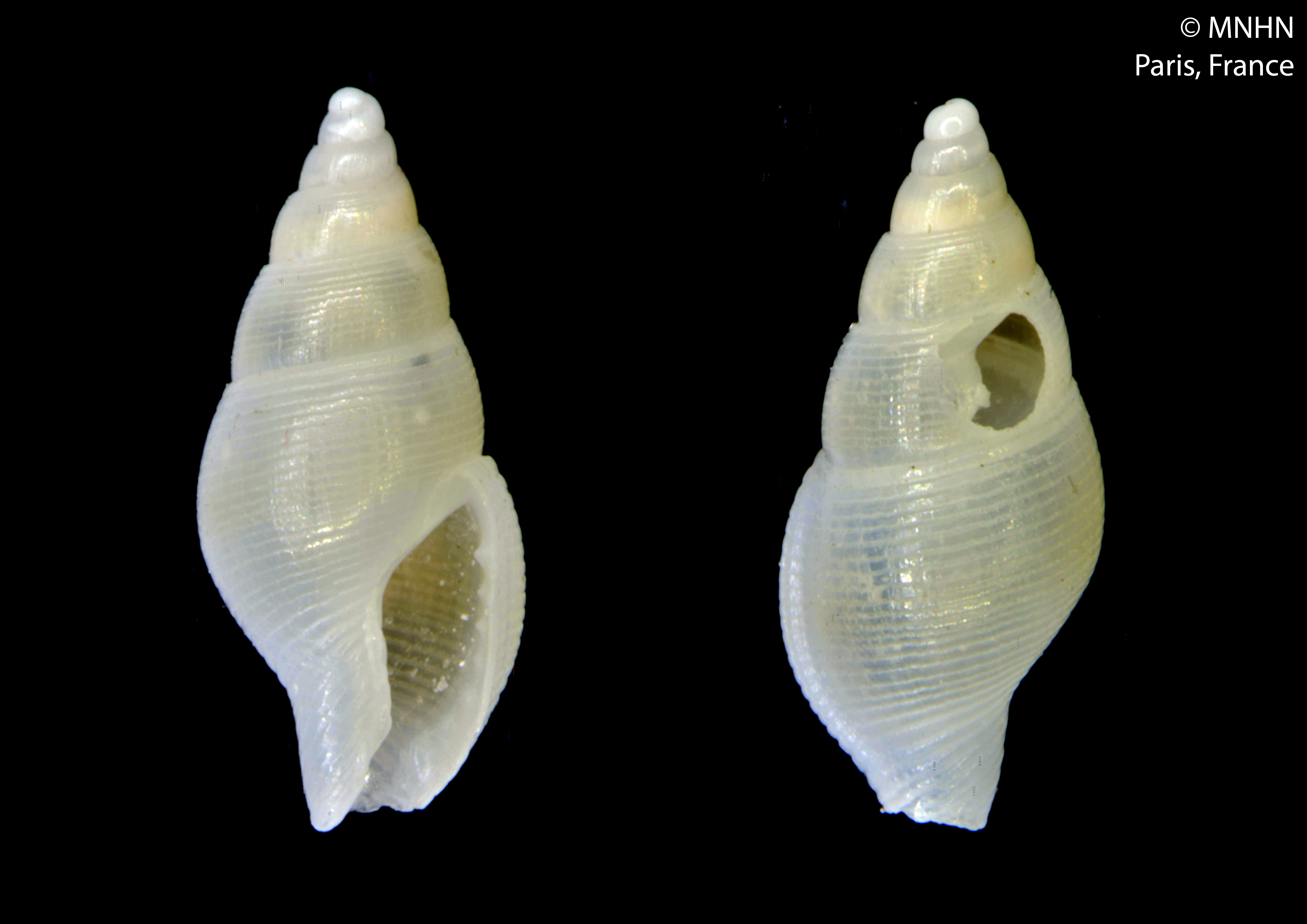
- Shell of Aoteatilia rimatara (holotype at MNHN, Paris)

Scientific classification
- Kingdom: Animalia
- Phylum: Mollusca
- Class: Gastropoda
- Subclass: Caenogastropoda
- Order: Neogastropoda
- Superfamily: Buccinoidea
- Family: Columbellidae
- Genus: Aoteatilia; Powell, 1939

Type species
- Daphnella substriata Suter, 1899

Species
- See text

= Aoteatilia =

Genus of gastropods

Aoteatilia is a genus of sea snails, marine gastropod mollusks in the family Columbellidae.

== Distribution ==
Species in this genus can be found off New Zealand, New Caledonia and French Polynesia.

== Species ==
Species within the genus Aoteatilia include:

- Aoteatilia acicula (Suter, 1908)
- Aoteatilia amphipsila (Suter, 1908)
- Aoteatilia caledonica K. Monsecour & D. Monsecour, 2016
- Aoteatilia larochei Powell, 1940
- Aoteatilia magna K. Monsecour & D. Monsecour, 2024
- Aoteatilia multispiralis K. Monsecour & D. Monsecour, 2024
- Aoteatilia psila (Suter, 1908)
- Aoteatilia rimatara K. Monsecour & D. Monsecour, 2018
- Aoteatilia substriata (Suter, 1899)
- Aoteatilia tenuistriata (Suter, 1908)
