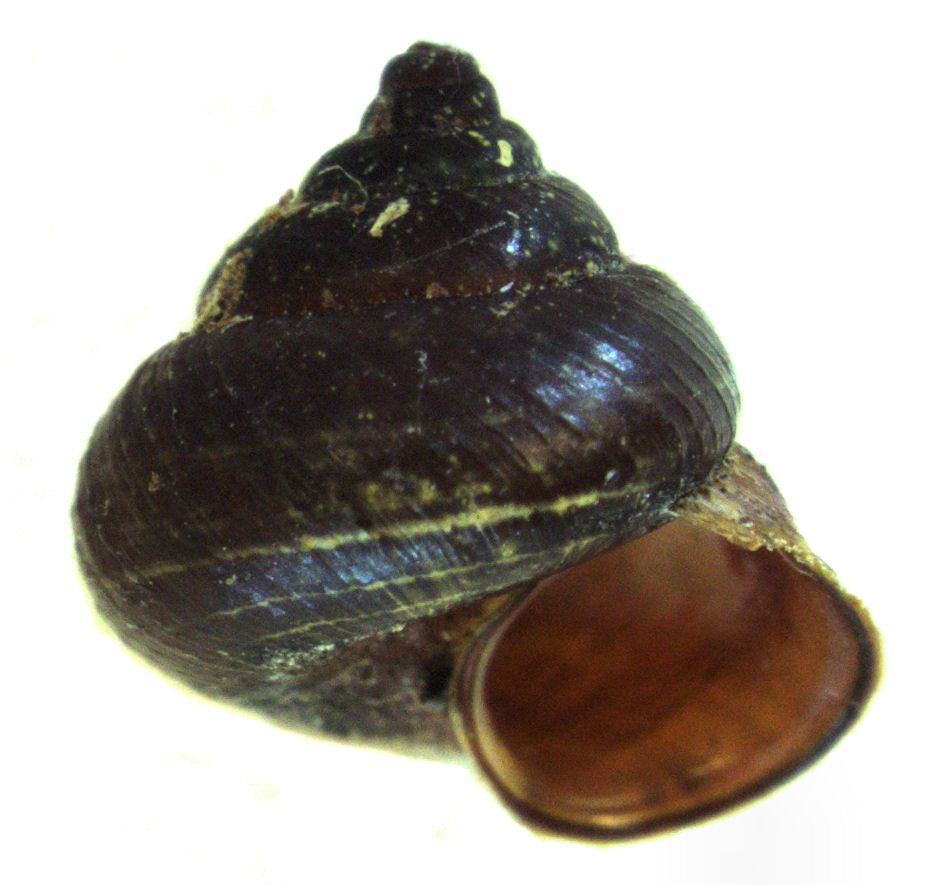
- Cytora lignaria

Scientific classification
- Kingdom: Animalia
- Phylum: Mollusca
- Class: Gastropoda
- Subclass: Caenogastropoda
- Order: Architaenioglossa
- Family: Pupinidae
- Subfamily: Liareinae
- Genus: Cytora; Kobelt & Moellendorff, 1897

= Cytora =

Genus of gastropods

Cytora is a genus of very small air-breathing land snails, terrestrial pulmonate gastropod molluscs in the family Pupinidae. This genus is endemic to New Zealand.

== Description ==
The height of the shell is less than 7 mm.

== Species ==
There are 42 species in the genus Cytora. However, 23 of them were first described in 2007.

Species in the genus Cytora include:

- Cytora annectens (Powell, 1948)
- Cytora aranea (Powell, 1928)
- Cytora calva (Hutton, 1882)
- Cytora chiltoni (Suter, 1896)
- Cytora cytora (Gray, 1850)
- Cytora depressa Gardner, 1968
- Cytora fasciata (Suter, 1894)
- Cytora filicosta (Powell, 1948)
- Cytora goulstonei B. A. Marshall & G. M. Barker, 2007
- Cytora hedleyi (Suter, 1894)
- Cytora hirsutissima (Powell, 1951)
- Cytora hispida Gardner, 1967
- Cytora kiama Climo, 1973
- Cytora lignaria (Pfeiffer, 1857)
- Cytora pallida (Hutton, 1883)
- Cytora pannosa (Hutton, 1882)
- Cytora rakiura Marshall & Barker, 2007
- Cytora septentrionale (Suter, 1907)
- Cytora solitaria (Powell, 1935)
- Cytora tekakiensis Gardner, 1967
- Cytora torquillum (Suter, 1894)
- Cytora tuarua B. A. Marshall & G. M. Barker, 2007

Synonyms

- Cytora ampla (Powell, 1941): synonym of Cytora lignaria (L. Pfeiffer, 1857)
