= Suavocallia splendens =

Conservation status
- Vulnerable (IUCN 2.3)

Scientific classification
- Kingdom: Animalia
- Phylum: Mollusca
- Class: Gastropoda
- Subclass: Caenogastropoda
- Order: Architaenioglossa
- Superfamily: Cyclophoroidea
- Family: Pupinidae
- Genus: Suavocallia
- Species: S. splendens

Binomial name
- Suavocallia splendens Dohrn, 1862

Species of gastropod

Suavocallia splendens is a species of land snail with an operculum, a terrestrial gastropod mollusk in the family Pupinidae. This species is endemic to Australia.
