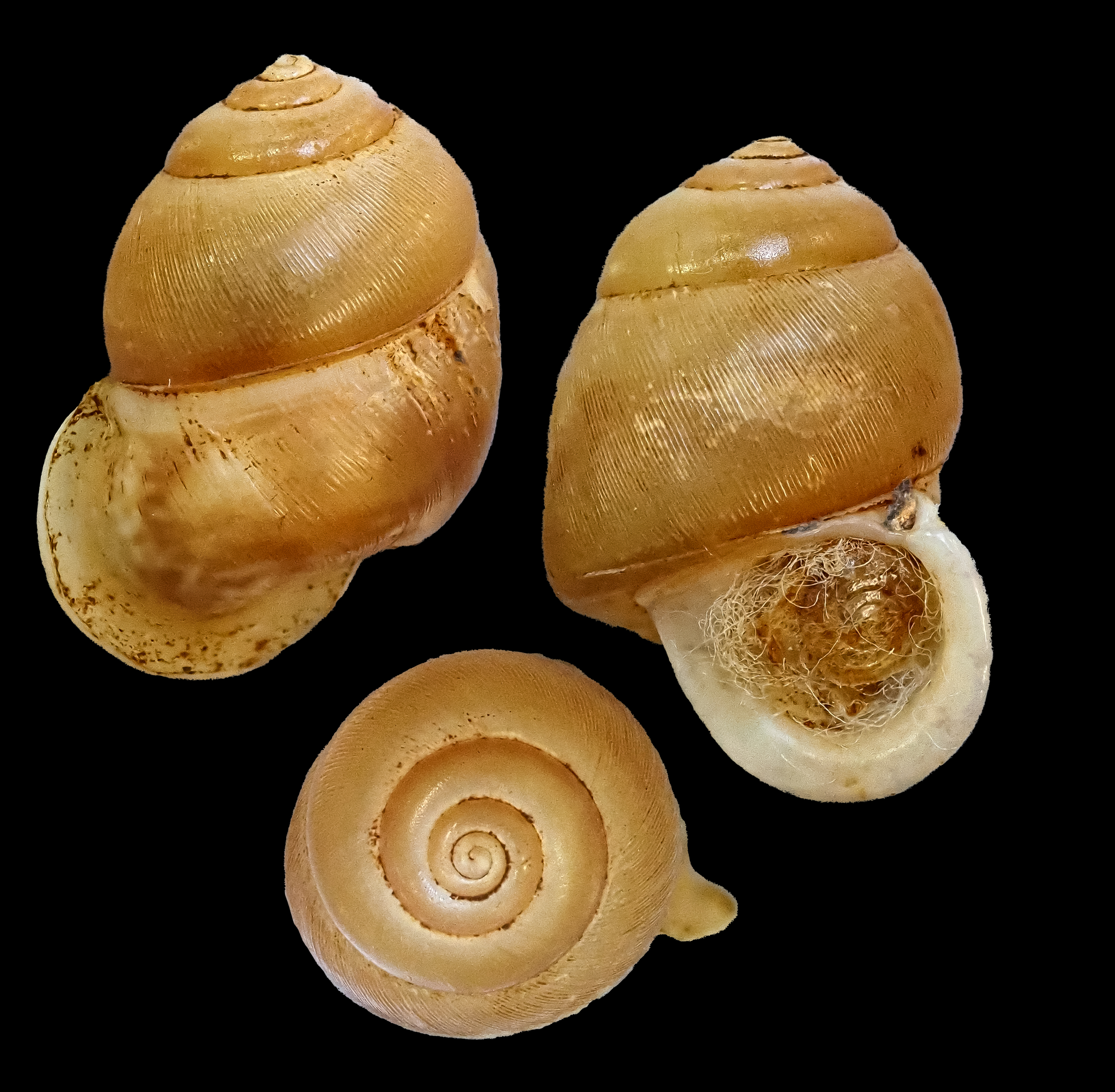
- Shell of Rhaphaulus franzhuberi (holotype at MNHN, Paris)

Scientific classification
- Domain: Eukaryota
- Kingdom: Animalia
- Phylum: Mollusca
- Class: Gastropoda
- Subclass: Caenogastropoda
- Order: Architaenioglossa
- Superfamily: Cyclophoroidea
- Family: Pupinidae
- Genus: Raphaulus; L. Pfeiffer, 1856

Type species
- Anaulus bombycinus L. Pfeiffer, 1855

Synonyms
- Anaulus L. Pfeiffer, 1855 (erroneously treated by L....); Raphaulus L. Pfeiffer, 1856(incorrect subsequent spelling); Rhaphaulus (Rhaphaulus) L. Pfeiffer, 1856 · alternate representation

= Raphaulus =

Genus of land snails

Raphaulus is a genus of land snails in the family Pupinidae.

== Nomenclature ==
Rhaphaulus is a substitute name for Anaulus L. Pfeiffer, 1855, by Pfeiffer treated as a junior homonym of Anaulus Ehrenberg, 1844 [Diatomacea]. Under Art. 1.4, the name of a plant and of an animal are not homonyms, but Rhaphaulus may be conserved under Art. 23.9.

== Species ==
- Rhaphaulus aborensis Godwin-Austen, 1917
- Rhaphaulus assamicus Godwin-Austen, 1886
- Rhaphaulus bombycinus (L. Pfeiffer, 1855)
- Rhaphaulus chrysalis (L. Pfeiffer, 1854)
- Rhaphaulus franzhuberi Thach, 2021
- Rhaphaulus jalorensis Sykes, 1903
- Rhaphaulus kuekenthali Kobelt, 1897
- Rhaphaulus lorraini L. Pfeiffer, 1856
- Rhaphaulus oakesi Godwin-Austen, 1917
- Rhaphaulus pachysiphon Theobald & Stoliczka, 1872
- Rhaphaulus perakensis E. A. Smith, 1898
- Rhaphaulus pfeifferi Issel, 1874
- Rhaphaulus shimangensis Godwin-Austen, 1917
- Rhaphaulus tonkinensis Páll-Gergely, Hunyadi & Maassen, 2014
- Rhaphaulus yamneyensis Godwin-Austen, 1917
- † Rhaphaulus zhuoi T. Yu, Salvador & Jarzembowski, 2021

Synonyms

- Rhaphaulus ascendens Sykes, 1903: synonym of Rhaphaulus lorraini L. Pfeiffer, 1856
- Rhaphaulus assamica Godwin-Austen, 1886: synonym of Rhaphaulus assamicus Godwin-Austen, 1886 (gender agreement)
- Rhaphaulus blanfordi (Benson, 1857): synonym of Streptaulus blanfordi Benson, 1857 (unaccepted combination)
- Rhaphaulus ceramicus Martens, 1864: synonym of Bellardiella ceramica (Martens, 1864) (original combination)
