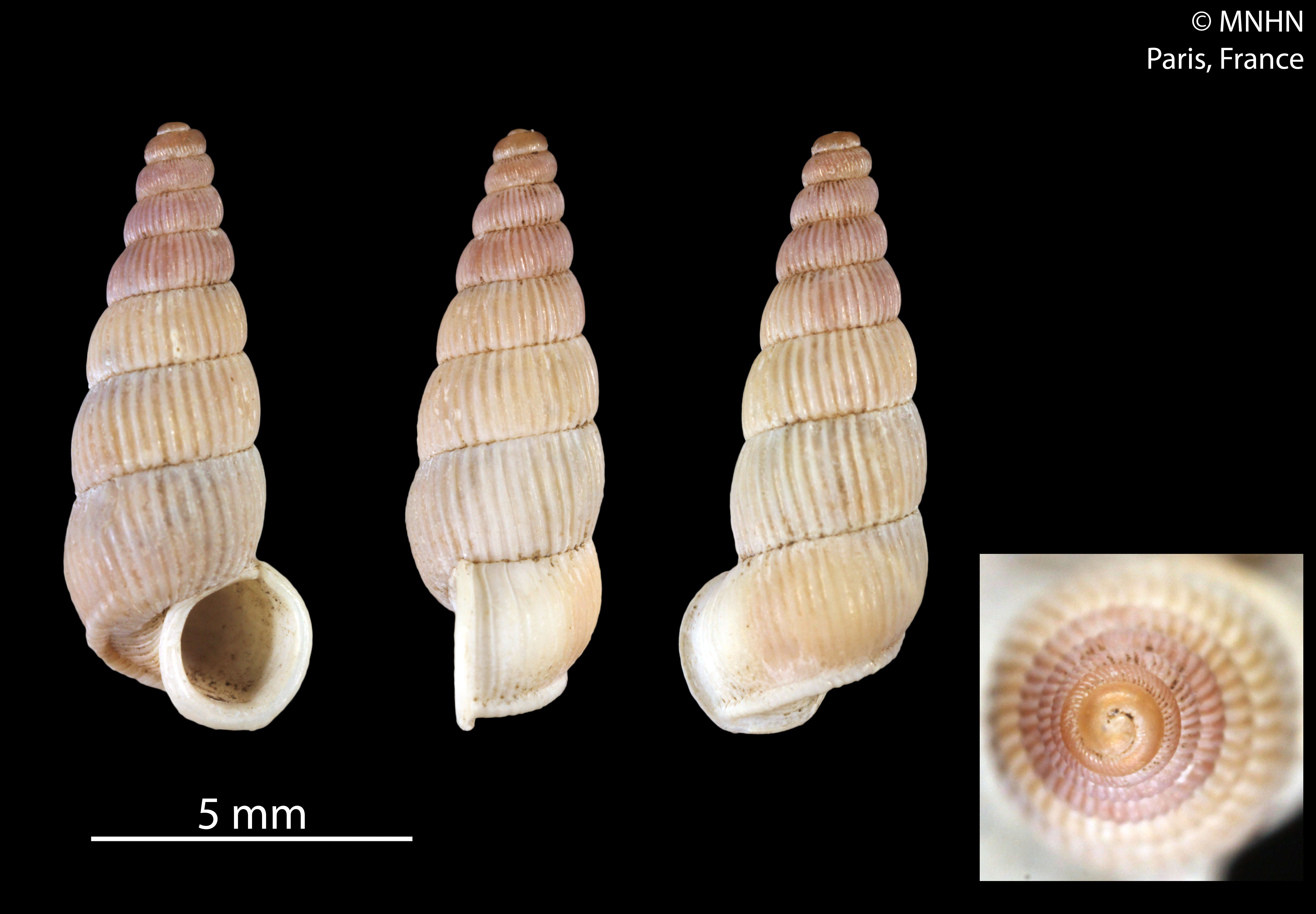
- Shell of Vargapupa biheli (holotype at MNHN, Paris)

Scientific classification
- Kingdom: Animalia
- Phylum: Mollusca
- Class: Gastropoda
- Subclass: Caenogastropoda
- Order: Architaenioglossa
- Superfamily: Cyclophoroidea
- Family: Pupinidae
- Subfamily: Pupinellinae
- Genus: Vargapupa; Páll-Gergely, 2015

Type species
- Vargapupa oharai Páll-Gergely, 2015

= Vargapupa =

Genus of gastropods

Vargapupa is a genus of air-breathing land snails, terrestrial pulmonate gastropod mollusks in the family Pupinidae.

== Species ==
- Vargapupa biheli Páll-Gergely, 2015
- Vargapupa humilis Páll-Gergely, 2016
- Vargapupa oharai Páll-Gergely, 2015

Taxon inquirendum:

- Vargapupa huberi Thach, 2018 (taxon inquirendum, debated synonym)
