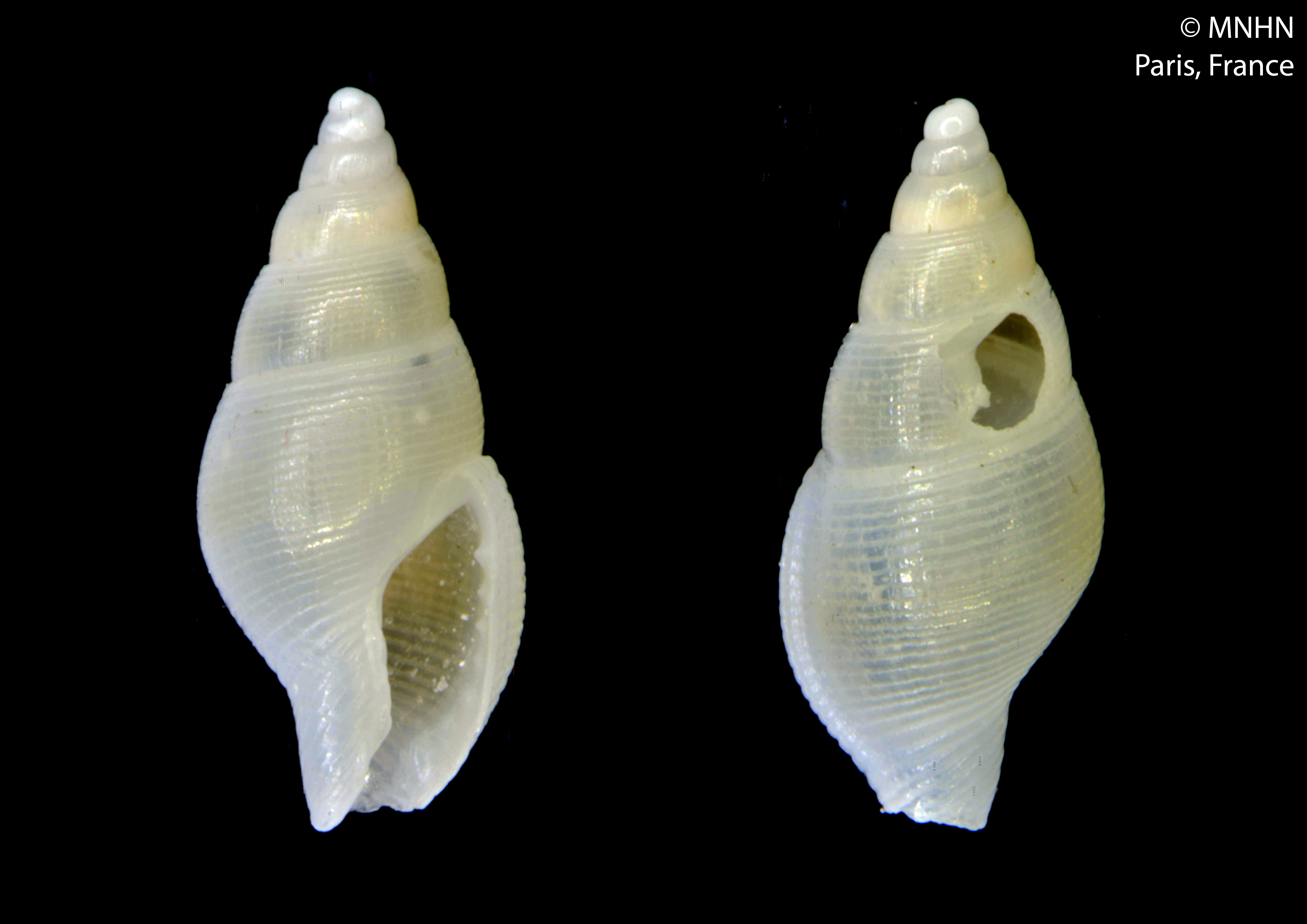
- Shell of Aoteatilia rimatara (holotype at MNHN, Paris)

Scientific classification
- Kingdom: Animalia
- Phylum: Mollusca
- Class: Gastropoda
- Subclass: Caenogastropoda
- Order: Neogastropoda
- Superfamily: Buccinoidea
- Family: Columbellidae
- Genus: Aoteatilia
- Species: A. rimatara

Binomial name
- Aoteatilia rimatara K. Monsecour & D. Monsecour, 2018

= Aoteatilia rimatara =

Species of gastropod

Aoteatilia rimatara is a species of sea snail, a marine gastropod mollusk in the family Columbellidae.

== Distribution ==
This marine species occurs off the Austral Islands, French Polynesia.
