= Coptocheilus electrothauma =

Scientific classification
- Kingdom: Animalia
- Phylum: Mollusca
- Class: Gastropoda
- Subclass: Caenogastropoda
- Order: Architaenioglossa
- Family: Pupinidae
- Genus: Coptocheilus
- Species: †C. electrothauma

Binomial name
- †Coptocheilus electrothauma Asato & Hirano in Hirano et al., 2019

Extinct species of land snail

Coptocheilus electrothauma is an extinct species of land snail that belonged to the subfamily Pupinellinae. It lived in Myanmar (Burmese amber) during the Middle Cretaceous period. The closest living relative to this species is likely Schistoloma sectilabrum due to its smooth, turriform/pipuniform shell.

The species name is Greek with "electro" meaning amber and "thauma" meaning miracle. This is because the inclusion of this holotype specimen was extraordinarily well preserved and described to be exceptional.

== Description ==
Its shell was small to medium sized being around 9.6 mm high and 4.5 mm wide. The shell was turriform/pupiniform shaped and had a robust and rough shell surface. The shell has weak growth lines and 5-6 whorls with it being curved and inflated.
