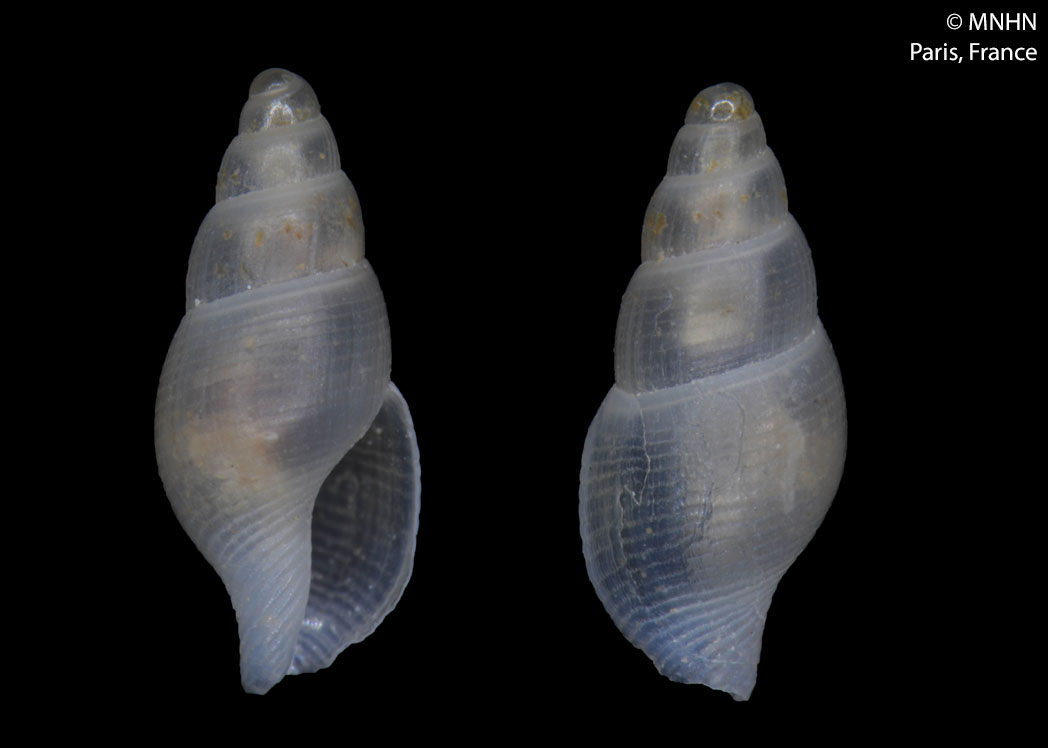
- Shell of Aoteatilia caledonica (holotype at MNHN, Paris)

Scientific classification
- Kingdom: Animalia
- Phylum: Mollusca
- Class: Gastropoda
- Subclass: Caenogastropoda
- Order: Neogastropoda
- Superfamily: Buccinoidea
- Family: Columbellidae
- Genus: Aoteatilia
- Species: A. caledonica

Binomial name
- Aoteatilia caledonica K. Monsecour & D. Monsecour, 2016

= Aoteatilia caledonica =

Species of gastropod

Aoteatilia caledonica is a species of sea snail, a marine gastropod mollusk in the family Columbellidae.

== Distribution ==
This marine species occurs off New Caledonia at a depth of 503 m.
