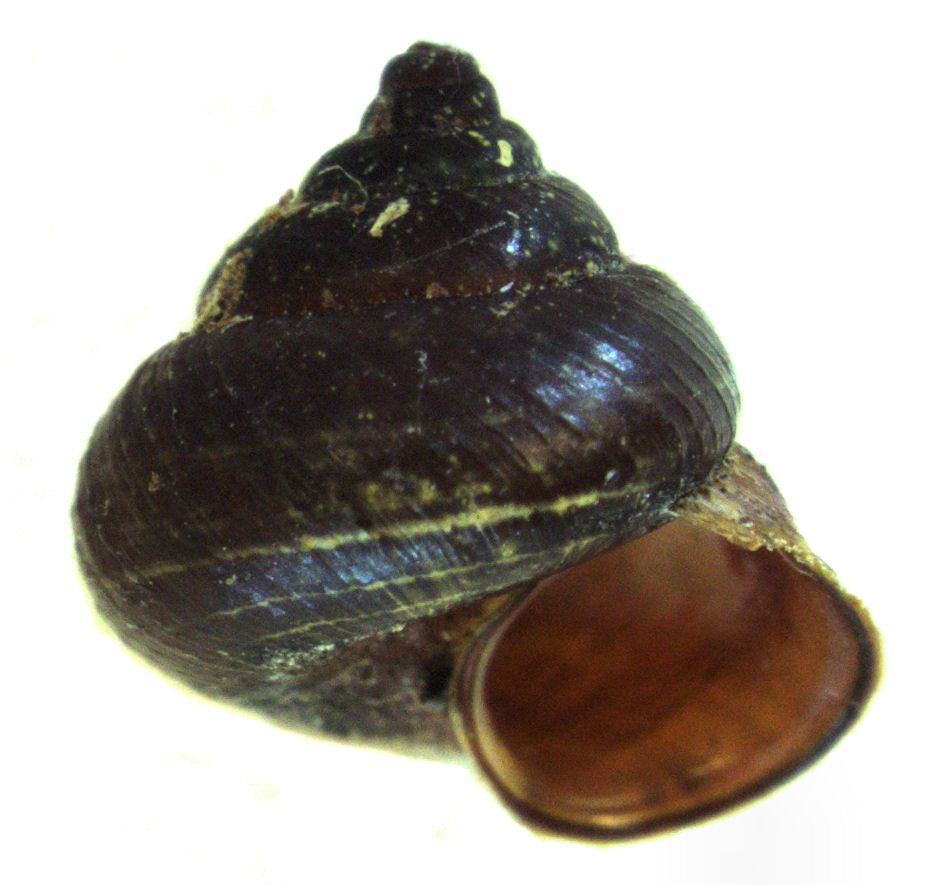
- Cytora lignaria shell

Scientific classification
- Kingdom: Animalia
- Phylum: Mollusca
- Class: Gastropoda
- Subclass: Caenogastropoda
- Order: Architaenioglossa
- Family: Pupinidae
- Genus: Cytora
- Species: C. lignaria

Binomial name
- Cytora lignaria (Pfeiffer, 1857)

Synonyms
- Cyclostoma lignarium Pfeiffer, 1857; Cytora ampla (A. W. B. Powell, 1941); Japonia (Cytora) lignaria (L. Pfeiffer, 1857) (unaccepted combination); Murdochia ampla A. W. B. Powell, 1941

= Cytora lignaria =

Species of gastropod

Cytora lignaria is a species of very small land snails with an operculum, terrestrial gastropod molluscs in the family Pupinidae.

== Distribution ==
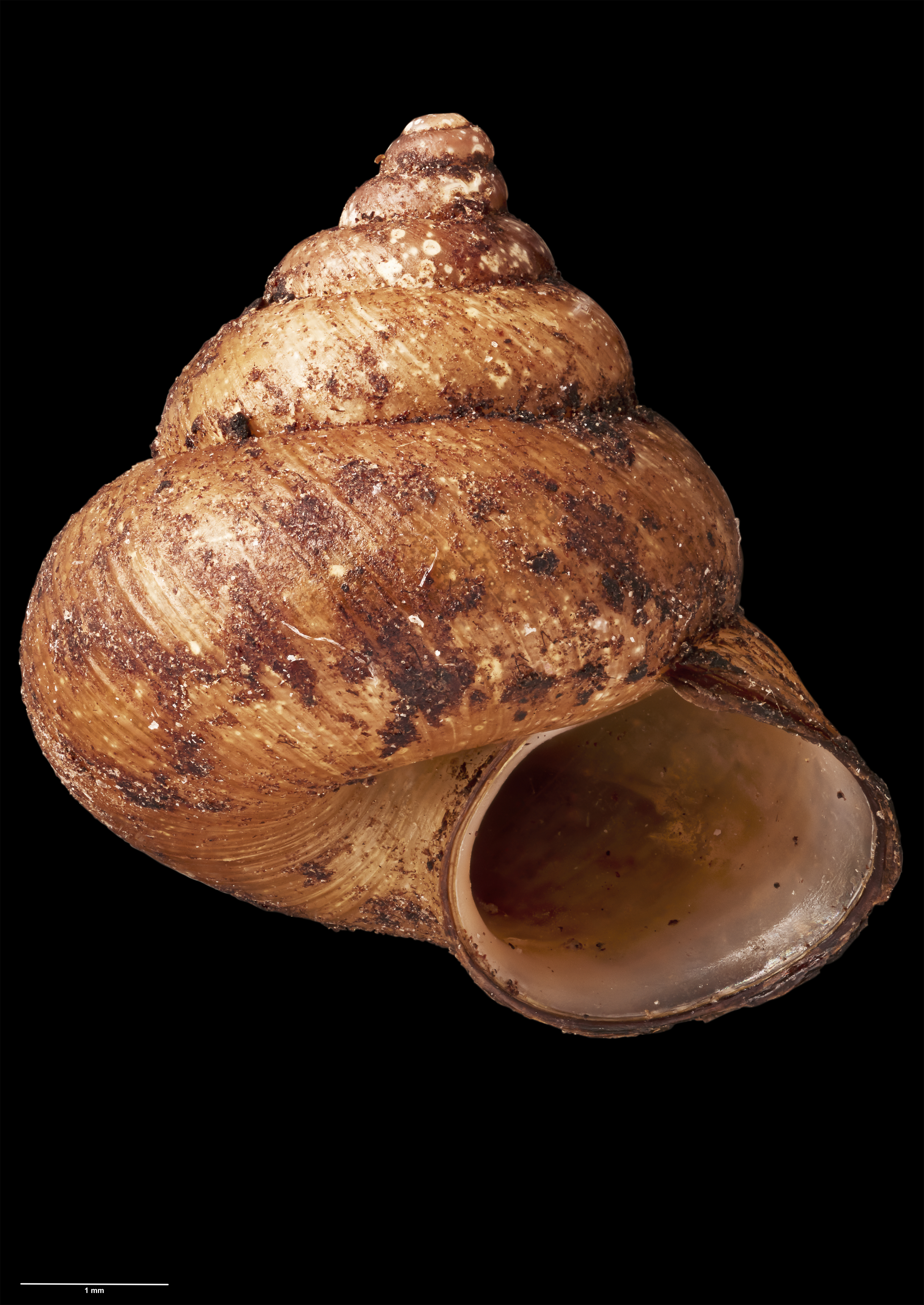
Type specimen

This species occur in New Zealand.
