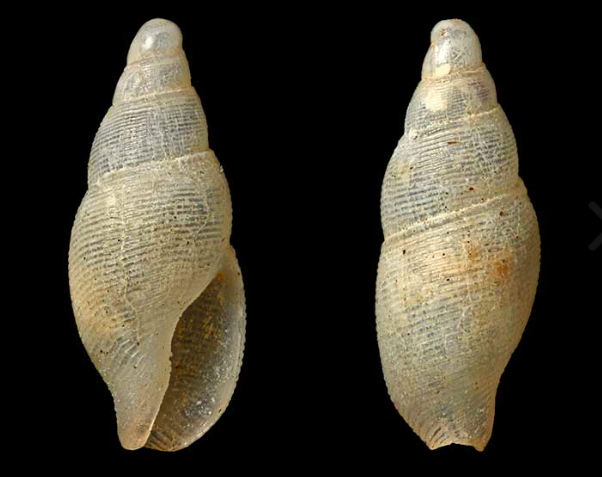
- Shell of Aoteatilia larochei (specimen at the Auckland Museum)

Scientific classification
- Kingdom: Animalia
- Phylum: Mollusca
- Class: Gastropoda
- Subclass: Caenogastropoda
- Order: Neogastropoda
- Superfamily: Buccinoidea
- Family: Columbellidae
- Genus: Aoteatilia
- Species: A. larochei

Binomial name
- Aoteatilia larochei A. W. B. Powell, 1940

= Aoteatilia larochei =

Species of gastropod

Aoteatilia larochei is a species of sea snail, a marine gastropod mollusk in the family Columbellidae.

== Description ==
The length of the shell attains 3.5 mm.

== Distribution ==
This marine species is endemic to New Zealand and occurs off North Island and Three Kings Island.
