= Hedleya =

Scientific classification
- Kingdom: Animalia
- Phylum: Mollusca
- Class: Gastropoda
- Subclass: Caenogastropoda
- Order: Architaenioglossa
- Family: Pupinidae
- Genus: Hedleya; Cox, 1892

Genus of gastropods

Hedleya is a genus of land snails with an operculum, terrestrial gastropod mollusks in the family Pupinidae.

== Species ==
Species within the genus Hedleya include:

- Hedleya macleayi
