= Suavocallia =

Scientific classification
- Kingdom: Animalia
- Phylum: Mollusca
- Class: Gastropoda
- Subclass: Caenogastropoda
- Order: Architaenioglossa
- Family: Pupinidae
- Genus: Suavocallia; Wenz, 1938

Genus of gastropods

Suavocallia is a genus of land snails with an operculum, terrestrial gastropod mollusks in the family Pupinidae.

== Species ==
Species within the genus Suavocallia include:

- Suavocallia finnegan J.Stanisic, 2010
- Suavocallia minuta J.Stanisic, 2010
- Suavocallia splendens (Dohrn, 1862)
- Suavocallia thorntoniana J.Stanisic, 2010
