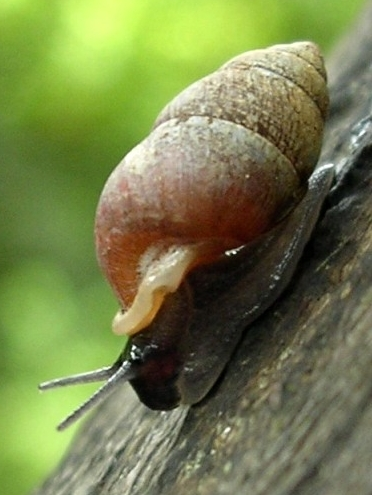

Scientific classification
- Kingdom: Animalia
- Phylum: Mollusca
- Class: Gastropoda
- Subclass: Caenogastropoda
- Order: Architaenioglossa
- Family: Pupinidae
- Genus: Pupinella
- Species: P. rufa

Binomial name
- Pupinella rufa (G. B. Sowerby, 1864)

= Pupinella rufa =

Species of gastropod

Pupinella rufa is a species of land snail in the superfamily Cyclophoroidea (according to the taxonomy of the Gastropoda by Bouchet & Rocroi, 2005).
