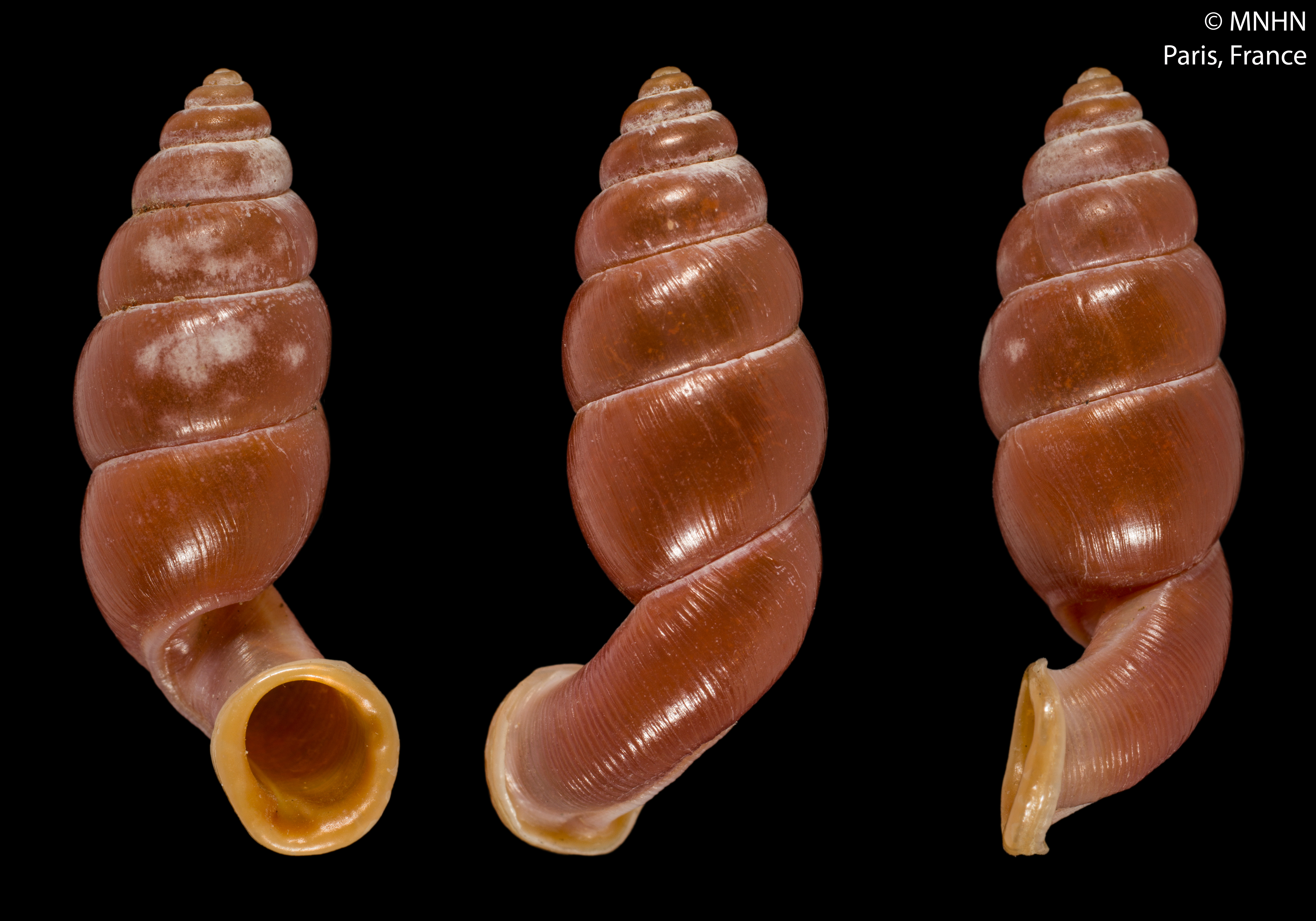
- Shell of Tortulosa tortuosa (holotype at MNHN, Paris)

Scientific classification
- Kingdom: Animalia
- Phylum: Mollusca
- Class: Gastropoda
- Subclass: Caenogastropoda
- Order: Architaenioglossa
- Superfamily: Cyclophoroidea
- Family: Pupinidae
- Genus: Tortulosa; Gray, 1847

Type species
- Pupa tortuosa Gray, 1825

Synonyms
- Cataulus L. Pfeiffer, 1851; Perlisia Tomlin, 1948; Tortulosa (Eucataulus) Kobelt, 1902; Tortulosa (Tortulosa) Gray, 1847

= Tortulosa =

Genus of gastropods

Tortulosa is a genus of air-breathing land snails, terrestrial pulmonate gastropod mollusks in the family Pupinidae.

These snails are restricted to Western Ghats of India and Sri Lanka.

34 species are recognized.

== Species ==
- Tortulosa albescens (Blanford, 1880)
- Tortulosa aurea (Pfeiffer 1855)
- Tortulosa austeniana (Benson 1853)
- Tortulosa barnaclei Tomlin 1928
- Tortulosa blanfordi (Dohrn, 1862)
- Tortulosa calcadensis (Blanford, 1869)
- Tortulosa colletti (Sykes, 1898)
- Tortulosa congener (Sykes, 1905)
- Tortulosa connectens (Fulton, 1903)
- Tortulosa costulata (Blanford, 1880)
- Tortulosa cumingi (Pfeiffer 1855)
- Tortulosa decora (Benson, 1853)
- Tortulosa duplicate (Pfeiffer 1855)
- Tortulosa eurytrema (Pfeiffer 1855)
- Tortulosa greeni (Sykes, 1899)
- Tortulosa haemastoma (Pfeiffer 1855)
- Tortulosa hartleyi Tomlin 1928
- Tortulosa layardi (Pfeiffer 1855)
- Tortulosa leucocheilus (A. Adams & Sowerby, 1866)
- Tortulosa marginata (Pfeiffer 1855)
- Tortulosa naggsi Raheem & S. Schneider, 2017 - extinct
- Tortulosa nevilli (Sykes, 1898)
- Tortulosa nietneri (Nevill, 1871)
- Tortulosa presoni (Sykes, 1905)
- Tortulosa pyramidata (Pfeiffer 1855)
- Tortulosa recurvata (Pfeiffer, 1862)
- Tortulosa rugosa (Fulton, 1903)
- Tortulosa smithi (Sykes, 1905)
- Tortulosa sykesi (Fulton, 1903)
- Tortulosa templemani (Pfeiffer 1855)
- Tortulosa thwaitesi (Pfeiffer 1855)
- Tortulosa tortuosa (Gray, 1825)

Synonyms

- Tortulosa huberi Thach, 2018: synonym of Tortulosa tortuosa (Gray, 1825) (junior subjective synonym)
- Tortulosa schileykoi Thach & F. Huber, 2018: synonym of Tortulosa tortuosa (Gray, 1825) (junior subjective synonym)
