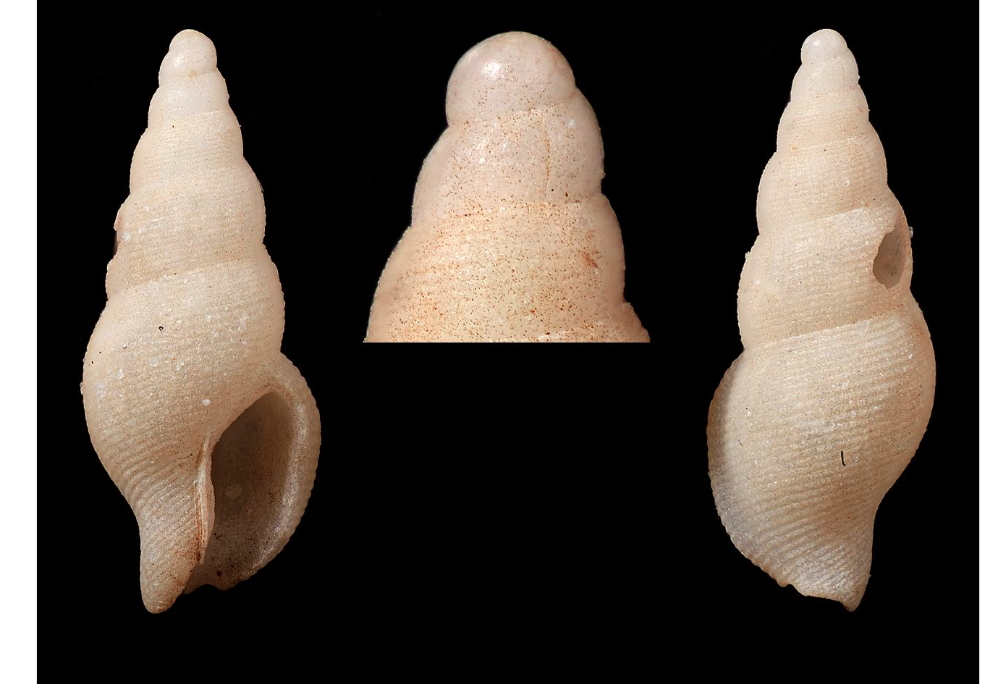
- Shell of Aoteatilia multispiralis (holotype at MNHN, Paris)

Scientific classification
- Kingdom: Animalia
- Phylum: Mollusca
- Class: Gastropoda
- Subclass: Caenogastropoda
- Order: Neogastropoda
- Superfamily: Buccinoidea
- Family: Columbellidae
- Genus: Aoteatilia
- Species: A. multispiralis

Binomial name
- Aoteatilia multispiralis K. Monsecour & D. Monsecour, 2024

= Aoteatilia multispiralis =

Species of gastropod

Aoteatilia multispiralis is a species of sea snail, a marine gastropod mollusk in the family Columbellidae.

== Distribution ==
This marine species occurs on the Walters Shoals, off Madagascar.
