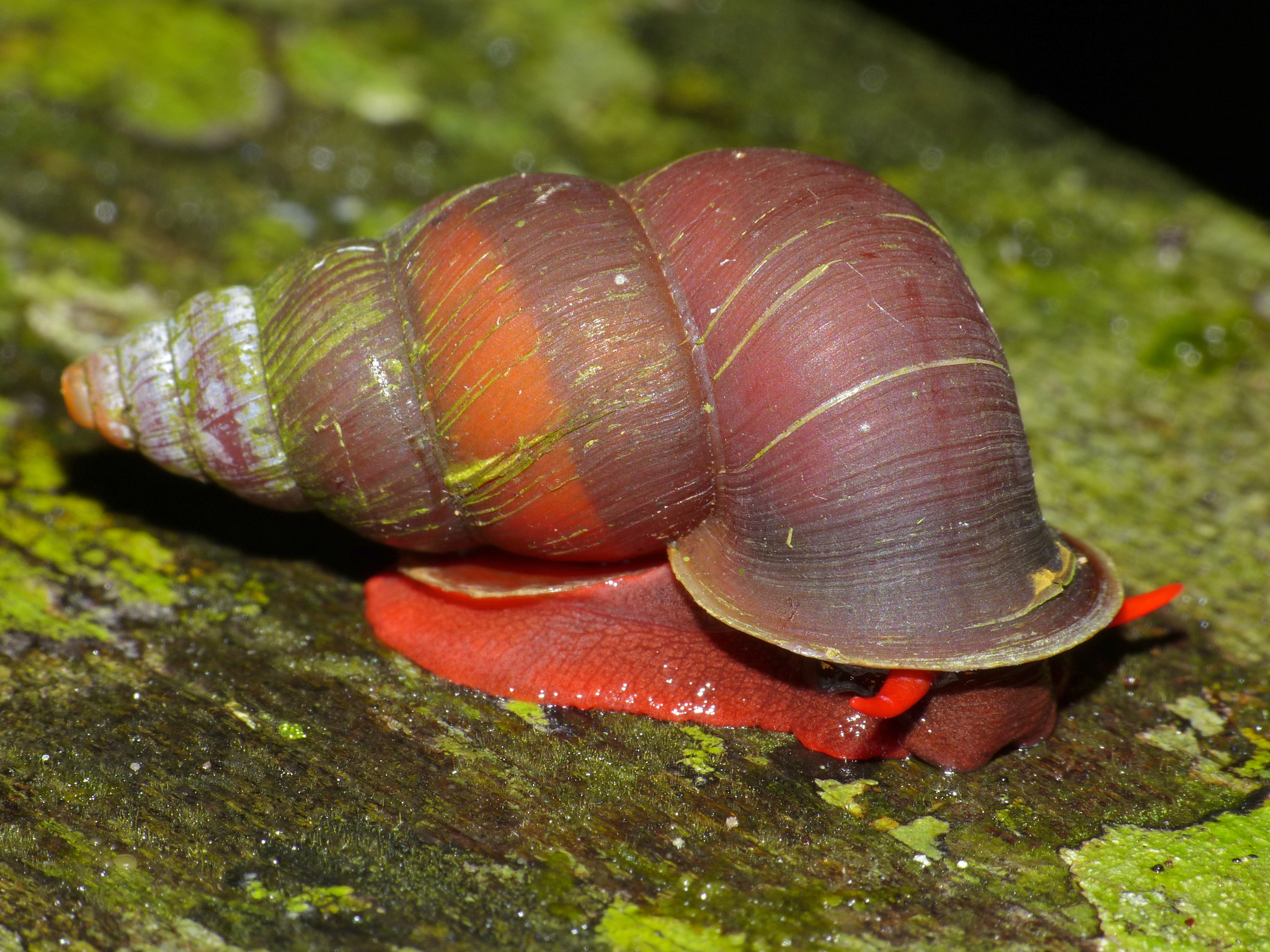
- Coptocheilus anostomus

Scientific classification
- Kingdom: Animalia
- Phylum: Mollusca
- Class: Gastropoda
- Subclass: Caenogastropoda
- Order: Architaenioglossa
- Superfamily: Cyclophoroidea
- Family: Pupinidae
- Genus: Coptocheilus; Gould, 1862

Type species
- Cyclostoma altum G. B. Sowerby I, 1842

Synonyms
- Coptochilus F. Sandberger, 1871 (invalid: unjustified emendation of Coptocheilus and junior homonym of Coptochilus Amyot & Serville, 1843 [Hemiptera].); Megalomastoma (Coptochilus) F. Sandberger, 1871; Pinteria Varga, 1972; Schistoloma Kobelt, 1902 (unnecessary replacement name); Schistoloma (Hololoma) Bartsch, 1915; Schistoloma (Schistoloma) Kobelt, 1902

= Coptocheilus =

Genus of gastropods

Coptocheilus is a genus of land snails with an operculum, terrestrial gastropod mollusks in the subfamily Pupinellinae of the family Pupinidae.

== Description ==
(Original description in Latin) The acute shell is chrysalis-shaped and narrowly perforate. It displays a chestnut-brown color. The aperture appears almost disjoint from the spire and features a more or less double peristome, where the inner lamella is incised posteriorly. The operculum is horny, multispiral, circular, and flattened.

== Species ==
Species within the genus Coptocheilus include:

- Coptocheilus altus (G. B. Sowerby I, 1842)
- Coptocheilus anostomus (Benson, 1852)
- Coptocheilus chinensis (L. Pfeiffer, 1857)
- Coptocheilus cochinchinensis (Rochebrune, 1882)
- Coptocheilus doriae (Issel, 1874)
- † Coptocheilus electrothauma (Asato & Hirano in Hirano et al., 2019)
- Coptocheilus funiculalus (Benson, 1838)
- Coptocheilus inermis Bavay & Dautzenberg, 1909
- Coptocheilus leferi (Morelet, 1861)
- Coptocheilus longyanensis (W.-C. Zhou, W.-H. Zhang & D.-N. Chen, 2009)
- Coptocheilus maunautim C. T. Bui & Páll-Gergely, 2020
- Coptocheilus maydelineae (Páll-Gergely, P.K. Nguyen & Y. Chen, 2019)
- Coptocheilus mcgregori Bartsch, 1909
- Coptocheilus messageri Bavay & Dautzenberg, 1909
- Coptocheilus quadrasi (Hidalgo, 1890)
- Coptocheilus sectilabris (A. Gould, 1844)
- Coptocheilus sumatranus Dohrn, 1881
- † Coptocheilus supracretaceus (Tausch, 1886)
- Coptocheilus tanychilus (Godwin-Austen, 1876)
- Coptocheilus yangi Z.-Y. Chen, 2021

Species brought into synonymy

- Coptocheilus altum (G. B. Sowerby I, 1842): synonym of Coptocheilus altus (G. B. Sowerby I, 1842) (incorrect gender ending for Coptocheilus altus (G. B. Sowerby I, 1842))
- Coptocheilus pauperculus (G. B. Sowerby I, 1850): synonym of Coptocheilus funiculalus (Benson, 1838) (unaccepted > junior subjective synonym)
- Coptocheilus perakensis Fulton, 1903: synonym of Schistoloma sumatranum (Dohrn, 1881): synonym of Coptocheilus sumatranus Dohrn, 1881 (junior synonym)
