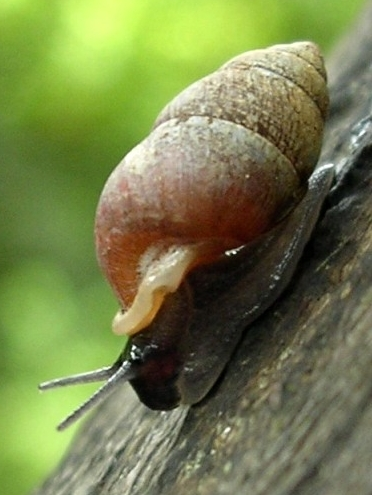
- Pupinella rufa

Scientific classification
- Domain: Eukaryota
- Kingdom: Animalia
- Phylum: Mollusca
- Class: Gastropoda
- Subclass: Caenogastropoda
- Order: Architaenioglossa
- Superfamily: Cyclophoroidea
- Family: Pupinidae
- Subfamily: Pupinellinae
- Genus: Pupinella; Baird, 1850

= Pupinella =

Genus of land snails

Pupinella is a genus of land snails in the superfamily Cyclophoroidea (according to the taxonomy of the Gastropoda by Bouchet & Rocroi, 2005).

== Species ==
Species within the genus Pupinella include:

- Pupinella brazierae E. A. Smith, 1887
- Pupinella frednaggsi Thach & F. Huber, 2017
- Pupinella funatoi Pilsbry, 1901
- Pupinella hedleyi E. A. Smith, 1897
- Pupinella humilis Hombron & Jacquinot, 1846
- Pupinella luteola Brancsik, 1895
- Pupinella mansuyi Dautzenberg & H. Fischer, 1908
- Pupinella masuhowaruensis Ueng & Chiou, 2004
- Pupinella occulta Benthem Jutting, 1963
- Pupinella oshimae Pilsbry, 1901
- Pupinella pupiniformis G. B. Sowerby I, 1842
- Pupinella rufa H. Adams, 1866
- Pupinella schaubi Benthem Jutting, 1963
- Pupinella straminea Benthem Jutting, 1963
- Pupinella strubelli E. A. Smith, 1896
- Pupinella swinhoei H. Adams, 1866
- Pupinella tapparonei Hedley, 1891
- Pupinella xanthostoma Benthem Jutting, 1933
