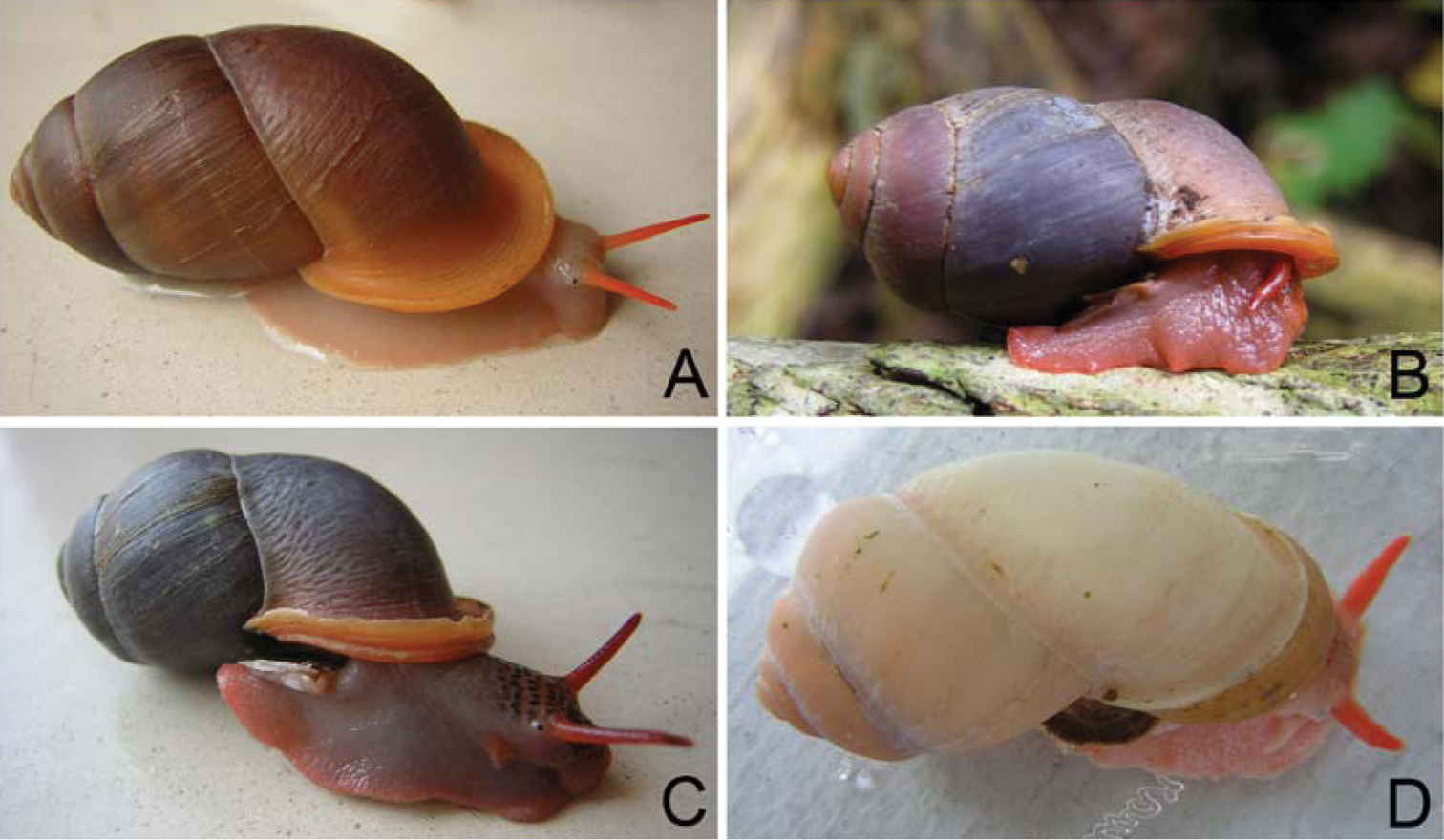
- Living specimens of Pollicaria: A: Pollicaria myersii (Vang Vieng, Laos); B: P. mouhoti mouhoti (Phitsanulok, Thailand); C: P. mouhoti monochroma (Loei, Thailand); D: P. elephas (Ipoh, Perak, Malaysia)

Scientific classification
- Kingdom: Animalia
- Phylum: Mollusca
- Class: Gastropoda
- Subclass: Caenogastropoda
- Order: Architaenioglossa
- Superfamily: Cyclophoroidea
- Family: Pupinidae
- Genus: Pollicaria; Gould, 1856

Type species
- Cyclostoma pollex Gould, 1856

Synonyms
- Hybocystis Benson, 1859

= Pollicaria =

Genus of gastropods

Pollicaria, commonly known as the elephant pupinid snails, is a genus of land snails with a gill and an operculum. They are in the family Pupinidae, superfamily Cyclophoroidea.

This genus of land snails is endemic to Indochina.

Like other pupinid snails, the shells of these snails are shaped like insect pupae. The shells are however characteristically large, up to 50 mm (1.97 in), in contrast to other pupinids, many of which are considerably smaller. The soft parts of species in this genus are yellowish to pale orange in color, and their shells can range in color from black or yellowish to bright orange. These snails feed on decaying organic matter on forest floors.

== Taxonomy ==
Pollicaria belongs to the family Pupinidae of the superfamily Cyclophoroidea. The genus was first established by the American malacologist Augustus Addison Gould in 1856, to contain his newly described Cyclostoma pollex (now accepted as Pollicaria gravida).

=== Species ===
The genus Pollicaria contains six species:

- Pollicaria arlingi Thach, 2018
- Pollicaria elephas (Morgan, 1885) - endemic to limestone outcrops in Perak, Peninsular Malaysia
- Pollicaria gravida (Benson, 1856) - endemic to Burma, including Mawlamyine, Dawei and Tanintharyi
- Pollicaria mouhoti (Pfeifer, 1862)

- Pollicaria mouhoti mouhoti (Pfeifer, 1862) - found in Cambodia, and some areas of Thailand
- Pollicaria mouhoti monochroma Kongim & Panha, 2013 - found in Thailand

- Pollicaria myersii (Haines, 1855) - synonym: Pollicaria rochebruni (Mabille, 1887) (endemic to Tonkin, Vietnam) - restricted to limestone areas in Vientiane to Luang Prabang in Laos. Probably also found in northern Thailand
- Pollicaria nicoarlingi Thach, 2021
- Pollicaria rochebruni (Mabille, 1887)

Synonyms

- Pollicaria crossei (Dautzenberg & ďHamonville, 1887) - endemic to Tonkin, Vietnam: synonym of Pollicaria rochebruni (Mabille, 1887)
- Pollicaria myersi (Haines, 1855): synonym of Pollicaria myersii (Haines, 1855) (incorrect subsequent spelling)

== Description ==
Elephant pupinid snails have distinctively shaped shells that resemble insect pupae. The shell is thick and solid, ranging in height from 35 to 50 mm (1.38 to 1.97 in). The shells possess a shallow angled groove at the rear which functions as a breathing device. They range in color from monochrome black or yellowish to bright orange

The body is yellowish to pale orange. Patches of dark-brown to black spots may be found scattered on the head and on the upper surfaces of the muscular foot. The head contains darker orange tentacles with dark eye spots on the outer base. The foot is broad and short. The operculum is attached to the rear top part of the foot.

Elephant pupinid snails are dioecious (having separate male and female sexes). Males have a cone-shaped external penis on the right side of their body which will broaden and enlarge during mating season. Females also have a genital groove on the right side of their body.

== Distribution and habitat ==
Elephant pupinid snails are endemic to tropical forests in Indochina. They are present in Burma, Cambodia, Laos, Peninsular Malaysia, Thailand, and Vietnam. They are commonly found in abundant numbers under the leaf litter of forests near limestone outcroppings.

== Ecology ==
Like other pupinids, elephant pupinid snails are important decomposers, feeding on decaying organic matter under leaf litter on the forest floor.
