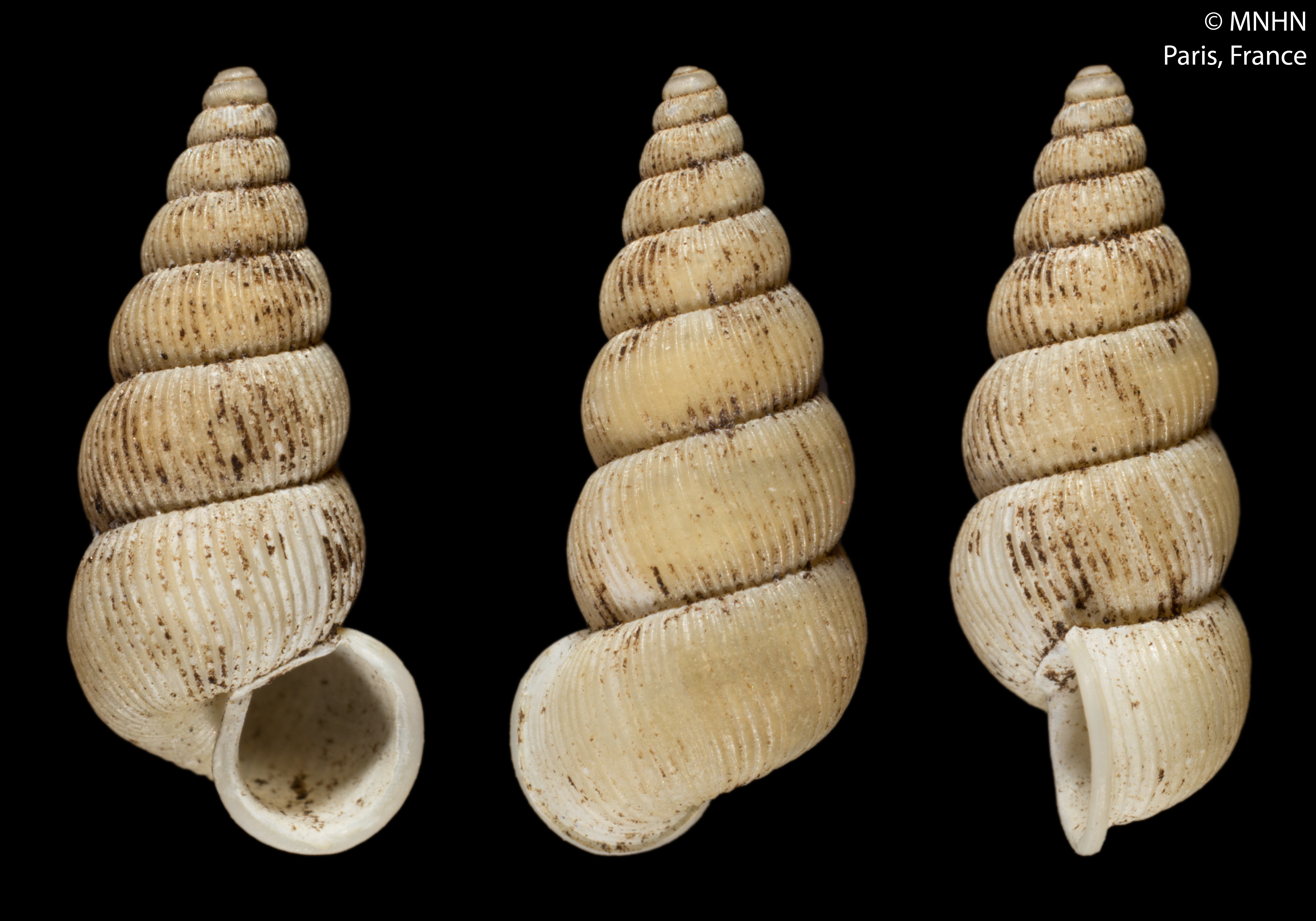
- Shell of Pseudopomatias amoenus (paralectotype at MNHN, Paris)

Scientific classification
- Kingdom: Animalia
- Phylum: Mollusca
- Class: Gastropoda
- Subclass: Caenogastropoda
- Order: Architaenioglossa
- Superfamily: Cyclophoroidea
- Family: Pupinidae
- Genus: Pseudopomatias; Möllendorff, 1885

Type species
- Pseudopomatias amoenus Möllendorff, 1885

Synonyms
- Fargesia Heude, 1886; Mellaca Mabille, 1889

= Pseudopomatias =

Genus of land snails

Pseudopomatias is a genus of land snails in the subfamily Pupinellinae of the family Pupinidae in the superfamily Cyclophoroidea (according to the taxonomy of the Gastropoda by Bouchet & Rocroi, 2005).

== Species ==
- Pseudopomatias abletti Páll-Gergely, 2015
- Pseudopomatias amoenus Möllendorff, 1885
- Pseudopomatias barnai E. Gittenberger & Leda, 2019
- Pseudopomatias caligosus Páll-Gergely & Hunyadi, 2018
- Pseudopomatias eos Pilsbry & Hirase, 1905
- Pseudopomatias franzhuberi Thach, 2020
- Pseudopomatias harli Páll-Gergely, 2015
- Pseudopomatias himalayae (Benson, 1859)
- Pseudopomatias linanprietoae Páll-Gergely, 2015
- † Pseudopomatias lyui (T. T. Yu, B. Wang & Jarzembowski, 2019)
- Pseudopomatias maasseni Páll-Gergely & Hunyadi, 2015
- Pseudopomatias nitens Páll-Gergely, 2015
- Pseudopomatias peguensis (Theobald, 1864)
- Pseudopomatias phrunoi Páll-Gergely & Grego, 2019
- Pseudopomatias pleurophorus (Benson, 1857)
- Pseudopomatias prestoni Páll-Gergely, 2015
- Pseudopomatias reischuetzi Páll-Gergely, 2015
- Pseudopomatias shanensis Páll-Gergely, 2015
- Pseudopomatias siyomensis Godwin-Austen, 1917
- Pseudopomatias sophiae Páll-Gergely, 2015
- † Pseudopomatias zhuoi (T. T. Yu, B. Wang & Jarzembowski, 2019)

Synonyms

- Pseudopomatias fulvus Möllendorff, 1901: synonym of Pseudopomatias amoenus Möllendorff, 1885
- Pseudopomatias grandis (Godwin-Austen, 1876): synonym of Csomapupa grandis (Godwin-Austen, 1876) (unaccepted combination)
- Pseudopomatias luyorensis Godwin-Austen, 1917: synonym of Csomapupa luyorensis (Godwin-Austen, 1917) (original combination)
