= Henry Suter =

Swiss-born New Zealand zoologist, naturalist, palaeontologist, and malacologist

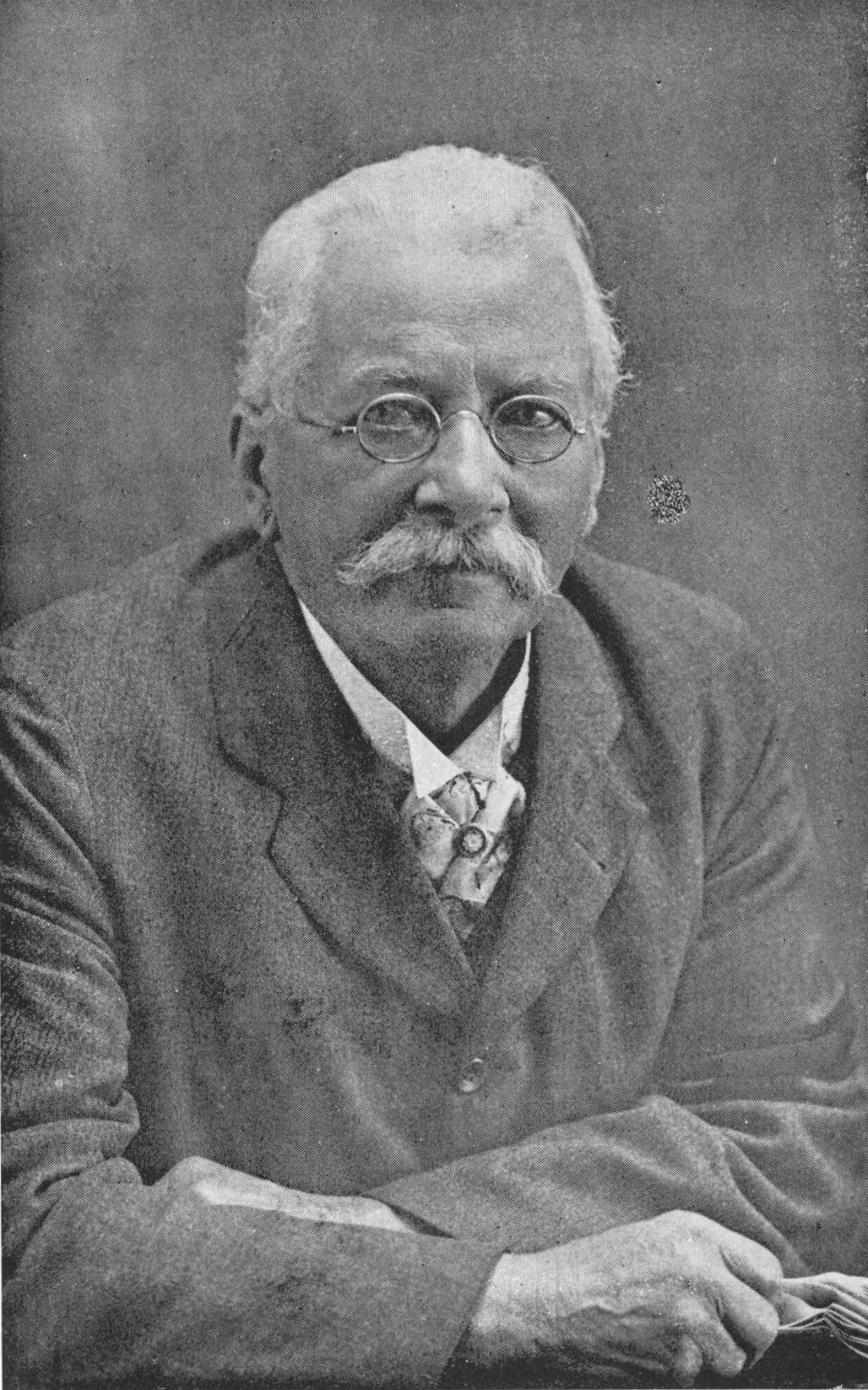
- Suter, c. 1915
- Born: Hans Heinrich Suter; 9 March 1841; Riesbach, Zurich, Switzerland
- Died: 31 July 1918 (aged 77); Christchurch, New Zealand
- Relatives: Arthur Eastwood (grandson)
- Scientific career
- Fields: Zoology; malacology; palaeontology

Henry Suter (born Hans Heinrich Suter, 9 March 1841 – 31 July 1918) was a Swiss-born New Zealand zoologist, naturalist, palaeontologist, and malacologist.

== Biography ==
Henry Suter was born on 9 March 1841 in Riesbach, Zurich, Switzerland, and was the son of a prosperous silk-manufacturer of Zurich. He was educated at the local school and university, being trained as an analytical chemist. Suter joined his father's business, and for some years he engaged in various commercial pursuits including managing his father's soap works. He married Barbara Julia Ida Naef (Ida) on the 1st of October 1867.

From his boyhood, Henry Suter was deeply interested in natural history. He enjoyed the friendship and help of such men as Dr. Auguste Forel, Professor Paul Godet, the brothers de Saussure (linguist Ferdinand de Saussure, Sinolog and astronomer Léopold de Saussure and René de Saussure Esperantist and scientist), Escher von der Linth, and especially the well-known conchologist, Dr. Albert Mousson.

Partly to improve his financial prospects and partly lured by the attraction of the fauna of a new country, Suter resolved to emigrate to New Zealand. It was the last day of the year 1886 when with Ida and a family of young children he landed in New Zealand. According to words by captain Frederick Hutton: "He was Swiss, lately arrived in New Zealand with introductions from well-known European zoologists."

== Career ==
Suter began his colonial career by taking up a remote selection in the Forty-mile Bush in the Wairarapa region. It is only in a story that a middle-aged townsman can ever turn backwoodsman with success, and so after about a year, Suter relinquished the hard and hopeless struggle.

At this critical time Captain Hutton, always a firm friend to zoologists, succeeded in obtaining for his protégé a post as assistant manager at the Hermitage Hotel, Mount Cook Village. While there, his wife Ida worked in the kitchens, helped by their daughters. Subsequently, work was available at the Canterbury Museum. After that, at one or another of the scientific institutions of New Zealand Suter spent the remainder of his life at congenial employment.

Suter established a laboratory in his residence in Christchurch for his microscopic research. He analyzed and documented the molluscs he had gathered from the Wairarapa region and around Mt Cook, and commenced writing his initial scientific papers. Additionally, he became a member of the Philosophical Institute of Canterbury. His first paper was published in the Transactions journal in 1890, followed by a second paper in 1891.

Henry Suter was an expert collector. He excelled in finding the most minute land snails, to find which requires knowledge, patience, and the sharpest eyes. Specialists in other groups were often supplied valuable material by Suter. In Switzerland he had formed a fine collection of European land and fresh-water shells, which was later acquired by the Australian Museum.

For several years, Suter restricted his studies to the terrestrial and freshwater molluscs of New Zealand. When his work on these approached completion, he proposed to extend his investigations to land gastropods abroad, hence his scattered papers on land molluscs from Brazil, South Africa, and Tasmania. His friends, however, persuaded him that science would be better served if he relinquished the foreign shells and transferred his attention to the marine molluscs of New Zealand. Not only did he take this course, but he finally embraced the Tertiary mollusks into his sphere of operations. Several of Suter's mollusc collections, including types and South American specimens, are at New Zealand institutions.

His characteristics were patience, perseverance, and concentration, rather than any great breadth of view.

== Death ==
After a brief illness, Henry Suter died at his home in Christchurch on 31 July 1918. He was buried at Linwood Cemetery on 3 August 1918.

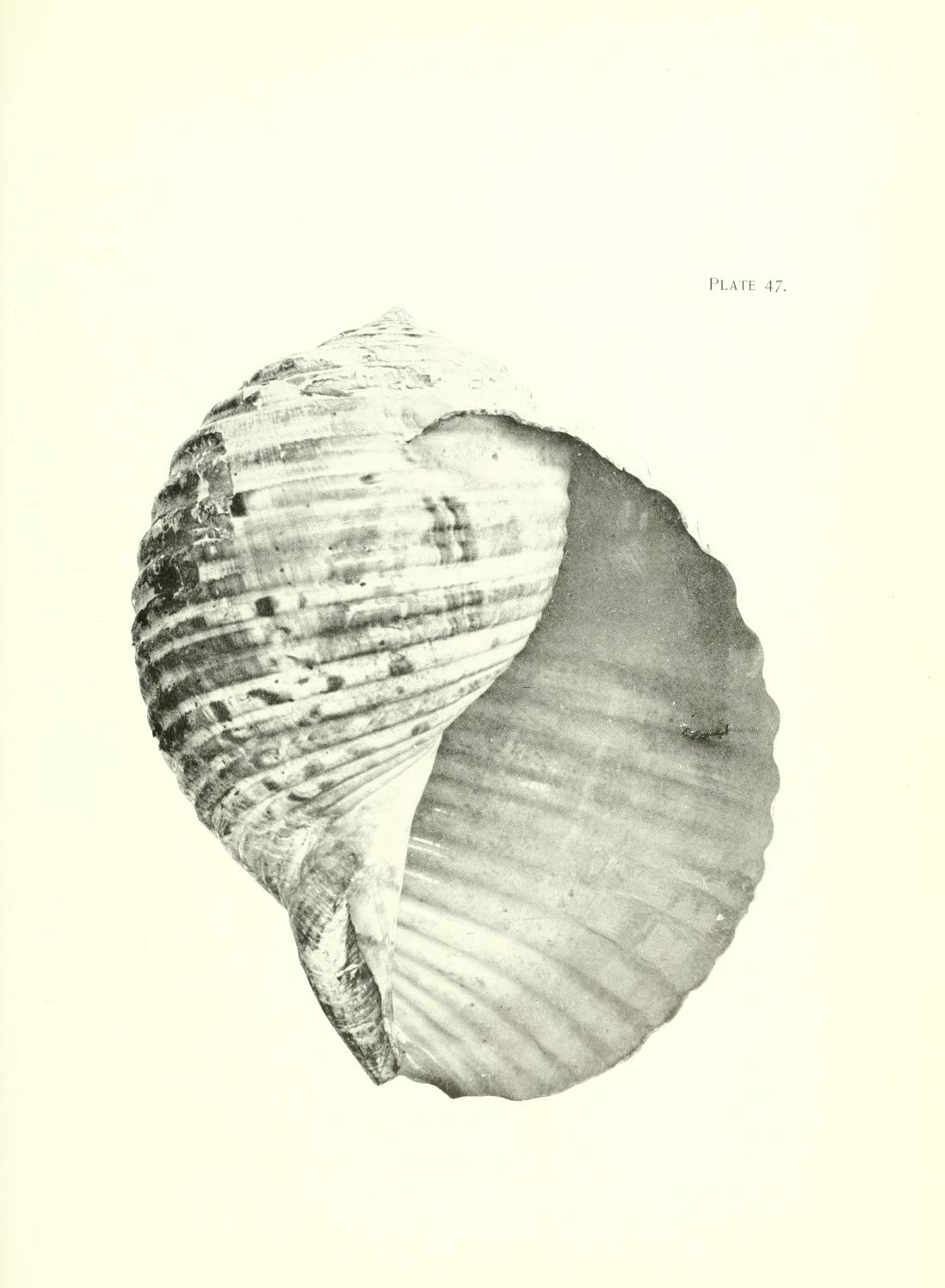
Tonna variegata from Suter's Manual of the New Zealand Mollusca

== Bibliography ==
Charles Hedley described Henry Suter's work as: "... excellent descriptions of small land-shells, illustrated with unusually clear and detailed drawings ..." with "... the jaws and radula of various minute snails. This very difficult work was beautifully done."

Suter's writings were largely modeled on those of his distinguished predecessor, Captain Hutton. It was indeed fortunate that the work of the one should have succeeded that of the other without the intervention of what the geologists describe as a nonconformity. Perhaps at no time did Suter quite realize the undiscovered residue of the fauna on which he worked.

His magnum opus was the Manual of the New Zealand Mollusca published in 1913–1915. This work was approached by a whole quarter-century of study and labour and covers 1,079 species.

Critical review of this Manual evaluated it as "an extraordinary advance" in conchology of New Zealand. Also the nomenclature of the Manual raised to a modern standard of its age. Review in Nature (1916) evaluated illustrations like this: "The illustrations reach a high level of excellence, and the figures generally are clear, well drawn, and adequate in detail." Augustus Hamilton (1854–1913; U.K.) planned the Manual, however, and obtained a grant from the Government to cover the costs of its production.

After the Manual was completed, Suter was engaged by the Geological Survey to describe collections of Tertiary mollusks gathered by the Department. On this he was busy for the remainder of his life, and the results are embodied in three Palaeontological Bulletins of the Geological Survey.

- (1913). Manual of the New Zealand Mollusca. Wellington, 1120 pp.
- (1913). "Descriptions of three new species of land shells from New Zealand". Proceedings of the Malacological Society of London 10: 333–334.
- (1915). Manual of the New Zealand Mollusca. Atlas of plates. John Mackay, Government printer, Wellington. (72 plates with descriptions)
- (1915). Alphabetical hand-list of New Zealand Tertiary Mollusca

Articles by Henry Suter published in Transactions and Proceedings of the New Zealand Institute:

- (1889) "Descriptions of New Species of New Zealand Land and Fresh-water Shells". 22
- (1890) "Miscellaneous Communications on New Zealand Land and Fresh-water Molluscs". 23
- (1891) "Contributions to the Molluscan Fauna of New Zealand". 24
- (1891) "List of the Introduced Land and Fresh-water Mollusca of New Zealand". 24
- (1891) "List of Land and Fresh-water Mollusca doubtful for New Zealand or not inhabiting it". 24
- (1891) "Miscellaneous Communications on New Zealand Land and Fresh-water Mollusca". 24
- (1891) "On the Dentition of some New Zealand Land and Fresh-water Mollusca, with Descriptions of New Species". 24
- (1892) "Notes on New Zealand Insects". 25
- (1892) "Contributions to the Molluscan Fauna of New Zealand". 25
- (1893) "Check-list of the New Zealand Land and Freshwater Mollusca". 26
- (1893) "Further Contributions to the Knowledge of the Molluscan Fauna of New Zealand, with Descriptions of Eight new Species". 26
- (1895) "Further Contributions to the Molluscan Fauna of New Zealand". 28
- (1898) "New Zealand Polyplacophora: Keys to Genera and Species". 31
- (1898) "List of New Zealand Mollusca described in Foreign Publications since 1890". 31
- (1900) "Further Contributions to the Geographical Distribution of the New Zealand Non-marine Mollusca". 33
- (1901) "On the Land Mollusca of Little Barrier Island". 34
- (1901) "List of the Species described in F. W. Hutton's Manual of the New Zealand Mollusca, with the Corresponding Names used at the Present Time". 34
- (1904) "Report on the Mollusca collected by Messrs. Keith Lucas and G. L. Hodgkin in Six Lakes of New Zealand". 37
- (1904) "The First-discovered New Zealand Gundlachia". 37
- (1904) "Revision of the New Zealand Species of the Genus Potamopyrgus, with Description of a New Species". 37
- (1904) "Revision of the New Zealand Species of the Genus Isidora, with Description of a New Subspecies". 37
- (1905) "Notes on New Zealand Mollusca, with Descriptions of New Species and Subspecies". 38
- (1905) "Genus Isidora: Correction of Article XVI. in Last Year's Transactions (Volume XXXVII)". 38
- (1905) "On Flabellum rugulosum, Tenison-Woods.". 38
- (1906) "Results of Dredging in Hauraki Gulf; with Descriptions of Seven New Species". 39
- (1906) "Notes on, and Additions to, the New Zealand Molluscan Fauna". 39
- (1907) "A New Placostylus from New Zealand". 40
- (1907) "Descriptions of New Species of New Zealand Mollusca". 40
- (1909) "List of Recent Shells found Fossil in New Zealand". 42
- (1912) "New Species of Tertiary Mollusca". 45
- (1916) "On the Origin of a New Species by Isolation". 49
- (1919) "Description of a New Species of the Family Cerithiidae". 51

== Species described ==
Henry Suter described six South American land snail taxa in 1900, most of them from Brazil. A later revision clarified the taxonomy and current status of these names.

=== Species considered valid ===
- Gastrocopta iheringi (Gastrocoptidae) is regarded as a valid species.
- Scolodonta interrupta (Scolodontidae) is regarded as a valid species.
- Radiodiscus compactus (Charopidae) is regarded as a valid species.
- Radiodiscus patagonicus (Charopidae) is regarded as a valid species.

=== Junior synonyms ===
- Streptaxis tumescens is treated as a junior synonym of Happia vitrina (Scolodontidae).
- Pyramidula schuppi is treated as a junior synonym of Rotadiscus amancaezensis (Charopidae).

== Legacy ==
Suter is commemorated in the scientific name of a species of New Zealand lizard, Oligosoma suteri.
