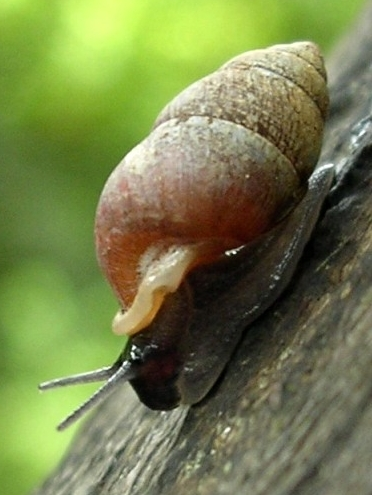
- Pupinella rufa

Scientific classification
- Kingdom: Animalia
- Phylum: Mollusca
- Class: Gastropoda
- Subclass: Caenogastropoda
- Order: Architaenioglossa
- Superfamily: Cyclophoroidea
- Family: Pupinidae; L. Pfeiffer, 1853

Diversity
- at least 121 extant species

= Pupinidae =

Pupinidae Temporal range: Cenomanian–Recent

Family of gastropods

Pupinidae is a taxonomic family of land snails with an operculum, terrestrial gastropod mollusks in the superfamily Cyclophoroidea (according to the taxonomy of the Gastropoda by Bouchet & Rocroi, 2005).

== Distribution ==
The distribution of the family Pupinidae includes the Himalayas, Assam, Myanmar, peninsular Malaysia, Sumatra, Borneo, Philippines, Vietnam, Thailand, Australia, Melanesia, Micronesia and Papua New Guinea.

== Taxonomy ==
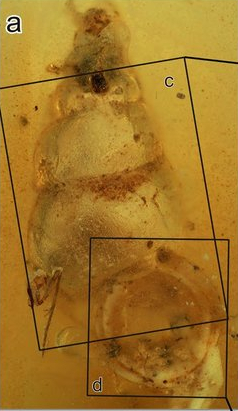
† Coptocheilus electrothauma holotype in Burmese amber

Subfamilies and genera within the family Pupinidae include (according to the taxonomy of the Gastropoda by Bouchet & Rocroi, 2005):

Pupininae L. Pfeiffer, 1853

- Alpinipupina Stanisic, 2010
- Barnaia Thach, 2017
- Callianella R. B. Newton, 1891
- Cordillerapina Stanisic, 2010
- Hargravesia H. Adams, 1871
- Hildapina Iredale, 1940
- Ischurostoma Bourguignat, 1874
- Moulinsia Grateloup, 1840
- Necopupina Iredale, 1937
- Porocallia Möllendorff, 1893
- Pupina Vingard, 1829 - type genus of the subfamily Pupininae
- Signepupina Iredale, 1937
- Siphonostyla Kobelt, 1897
- Suavocallia Wenz, 1938
- Tylotoechus Kobelt & Möllendorff, 1897

Liareinae Powell, 1946 - synonym: Cytoidae Climo, 1969 (n.a.) = not available name

Pollicariinae Thiele, 1929

- Pollicaria Gould, 1856
- Hybocystis Benson, 1859: synonym of Pollicaria A.A. Gould, 1856

Pupinellinae Kobelt, 1902 - synonyms: Ventriculidae Wenz, 1915, Pollicariini Thiele, 1929

- Barnaia Thach, 2017
- Bellardiella Tapparone Canefri, 1883
- Coptocheilus Gould, 1862
- Csomapupa Páll-Gergely, 2015
- Didomasta Iredale, 1941
- Hedleya Cox, 1892
- † Kallomastoma Stache, 1889
- Nodopomatias Gude, 1921
- Pseudopomatias Möllendorff, 1885
- Pupinella Gray [in Baird], 1850 - type genus of the subfamily Pupinellinae
- Raphaulus Pfeiffer, 1856
- Scaeopupina Iredale, 1941
- Schistoloma Kobelt, 1902: synonym of Coptocheilus A. Gould, 1862 (unnecessary replacement name)
- Streptaulus Benson, 1857
- Tortulosa Gray, 1847
- Vargapupa Páll-Gergely, 2015

subfamily incertae sedis

- (extinct) Cretatortulosa Yu, Wang and Pan, 2018 Burmese amber, Myanmar, Cenomanian.

== Ecology ==
These snails live in wet forests in leaf litter.
