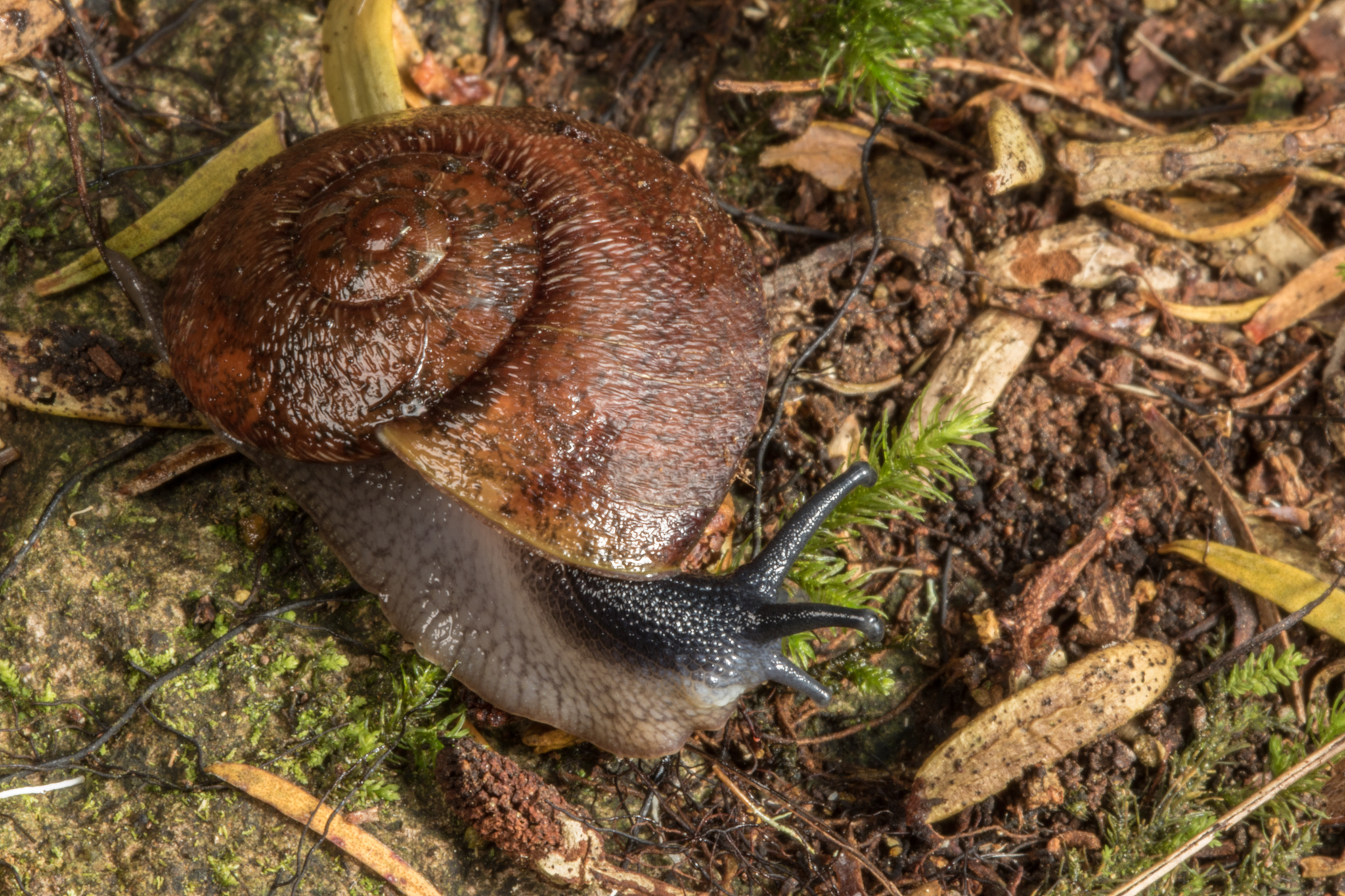
- Amborhytida dunniae

Scientific classification
- Kingdom: Animalia
- Phylum: Mollusca
- Class: Gastropoda
- Order: Stylommatophora
- Superfamily: Rhytidoidea
- Family: Rhytididae
- Subfamily: Rhytidinae
- Genus: Amborhytida; Climo, 1974

Type species
- Helix dunniae

Synonyms
- Rhytida (Amborhytida) Climo, 1974

= Amborhytida =

Genus of land snail

Amborhytida is a genus of land snails belonging to the family Rhytididae. First described in 1974, members of the genus are endemic to New Zealand.

== Description ==
Members of Amborhytida have one or two peripheral keels, no oblique peripheral cords, a reduced penis, and no spermatheca.

== Taxonomy ==
Amborhytida was described by Frank Climo in 1974, who described it as a subgenus of Rhytida. Amborhytida was raised to genus level in 1999. Phylogenetic analysis suggests that the members of Amborhytida diverged relatively recently in geological terms, within approximately 1.9 to 6.6 million years ago. Hamish Spencer, Fred J. Brook and Martyn Kennedy (2006) suggest this is likely due to areas of the Aupōuri Peninsula being islands during the Pliocene, including Cape Reinga-North Cape, Tohoraha / Mount Camel, and the Karikari Peninsula. Some of the closest genera to Amborhytida include Schizoglossa and Paryphanta, which separated into different genera between 9 and 11.6 million years ago.

== Ecology ==
Paryphanta busbyi and the Polynesian rat are a known predators of Amborhytida. Amborhytida has been observed eating the eggs of Maoristylus ambagiosus.

== Distribution and habitat ==
The genus is endemic to New Zealand, found on the upper North Island and Manawatāwhi / Three Kings Islands.

== Species ==
Species within the genus Kokikora include:

- Amborhytida dunniae (J. E. Gray, 1840)
- Amborhytida duplicata (Suter, 1904)
- Amborhytida forsythi (A. W. B. Powell, 1952)

== Gallery ==
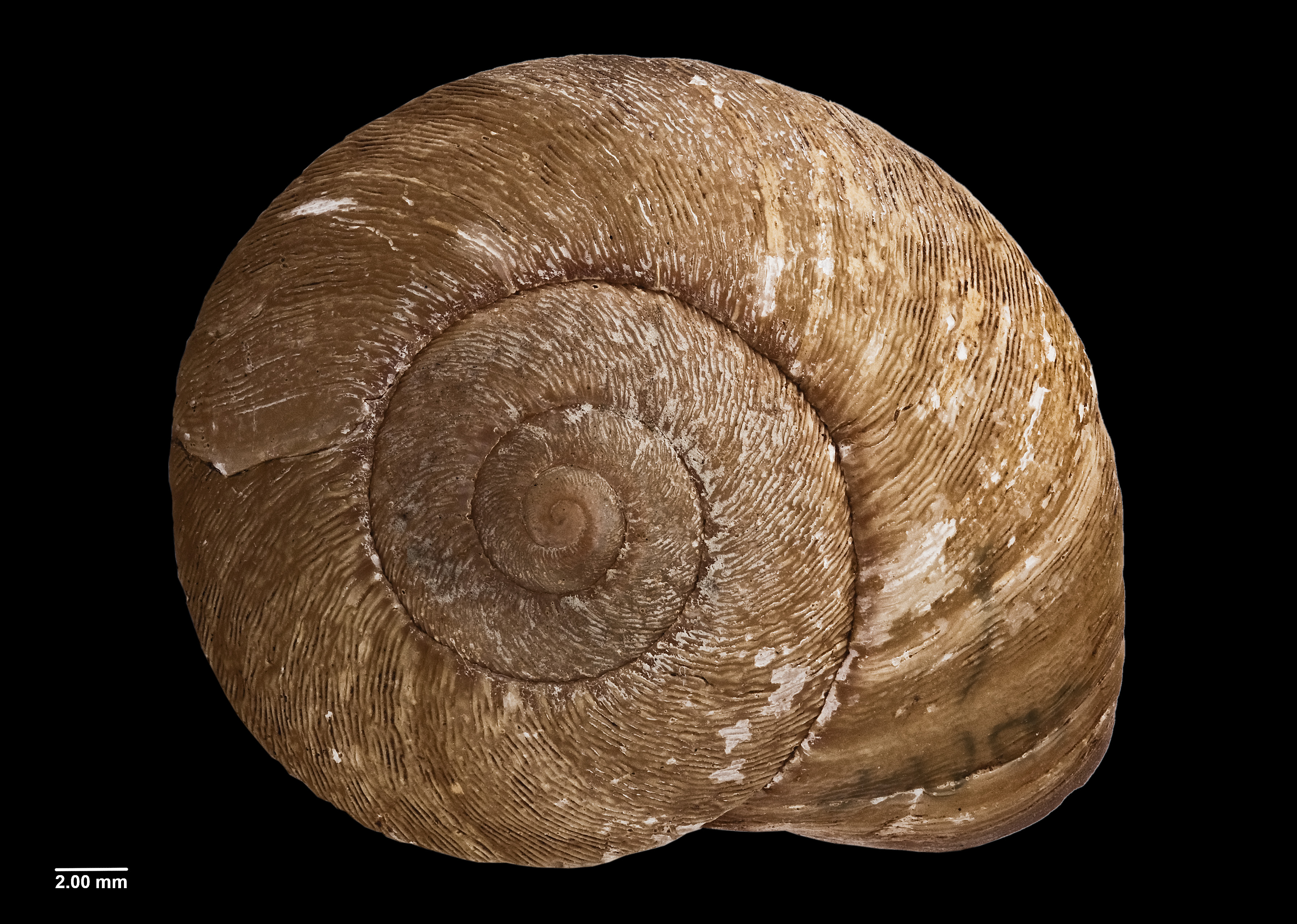
Type specimen of Amborhytida dunniae

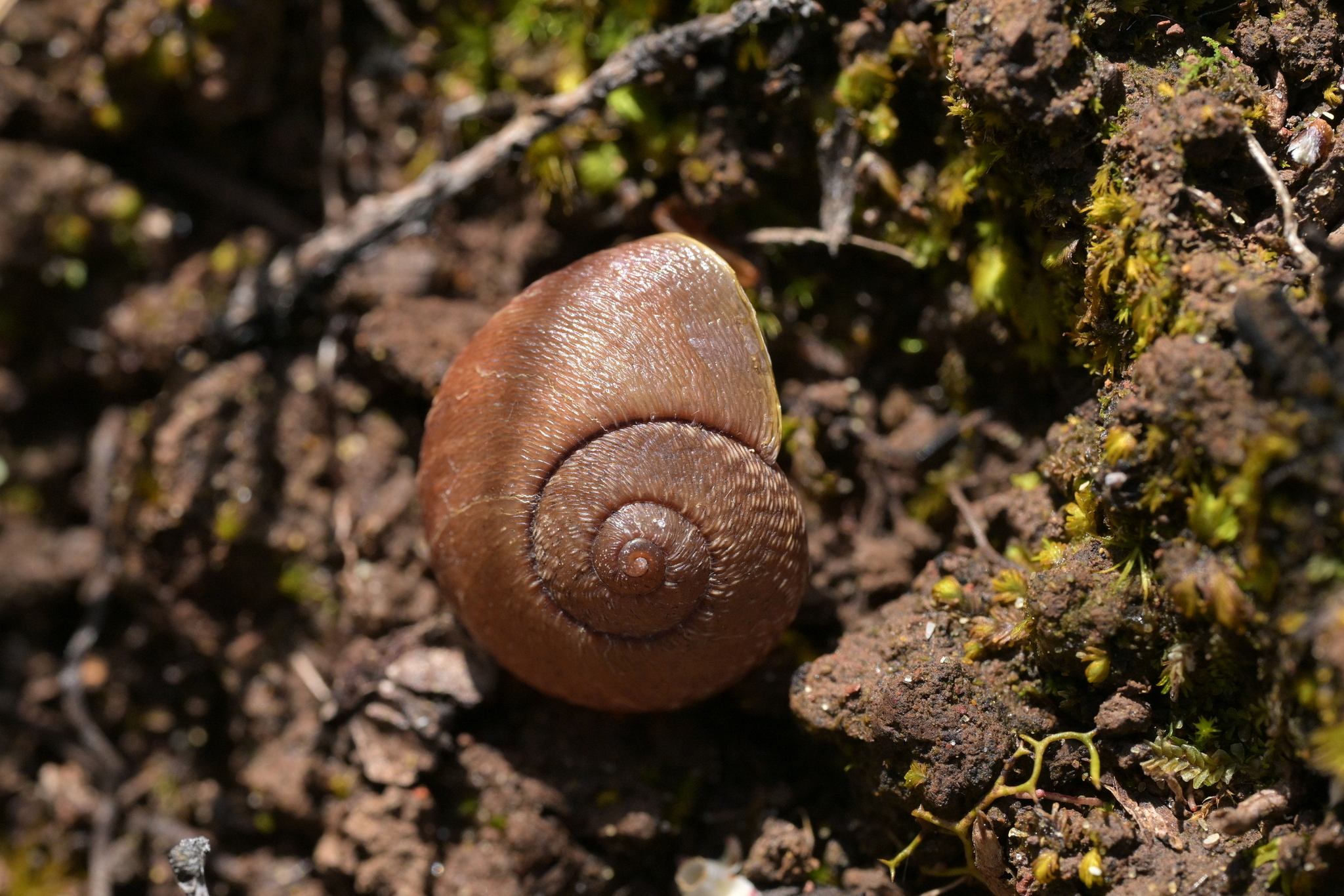
Amborhytida duplicata

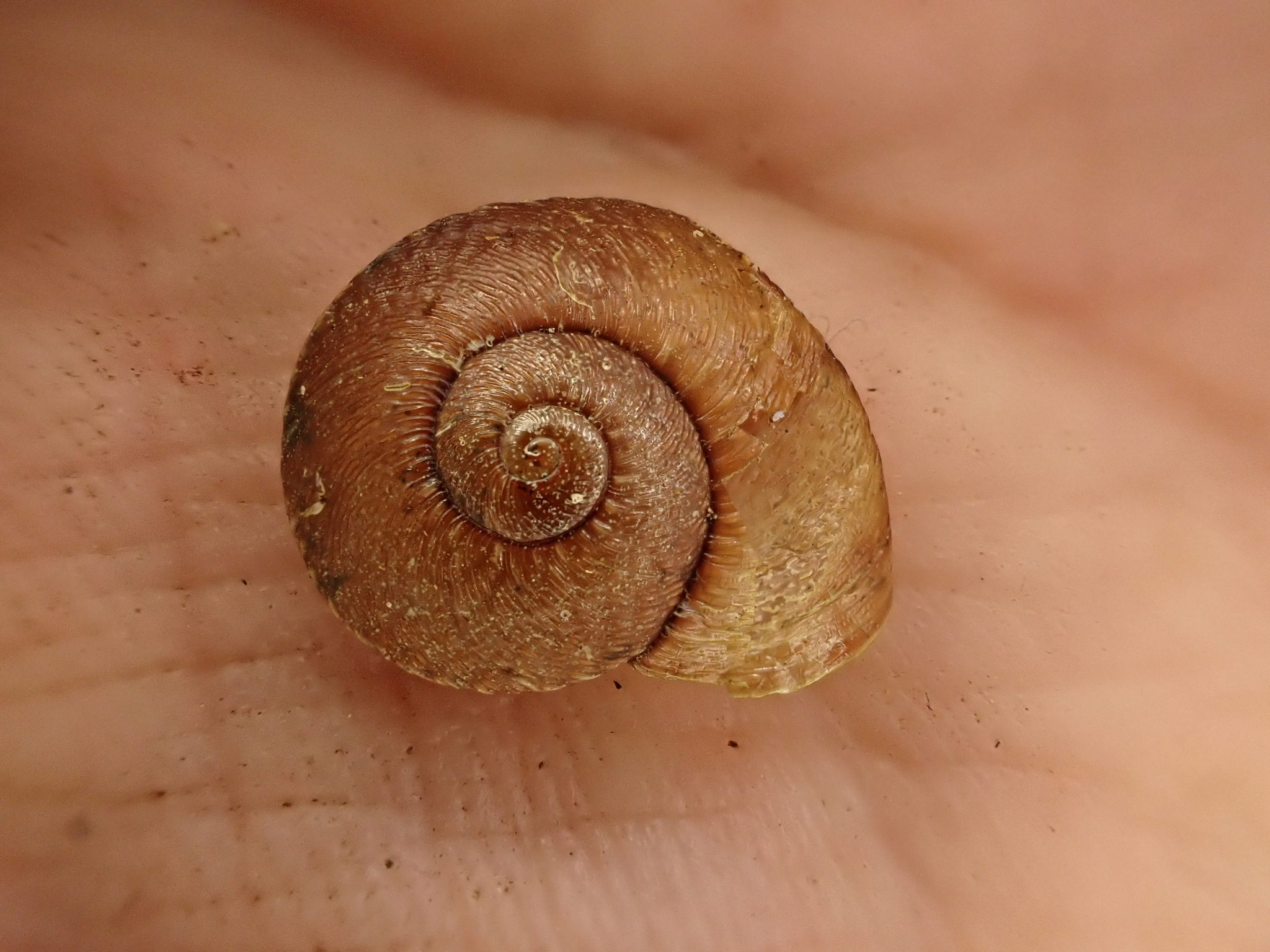
Amborhytida forsythi
