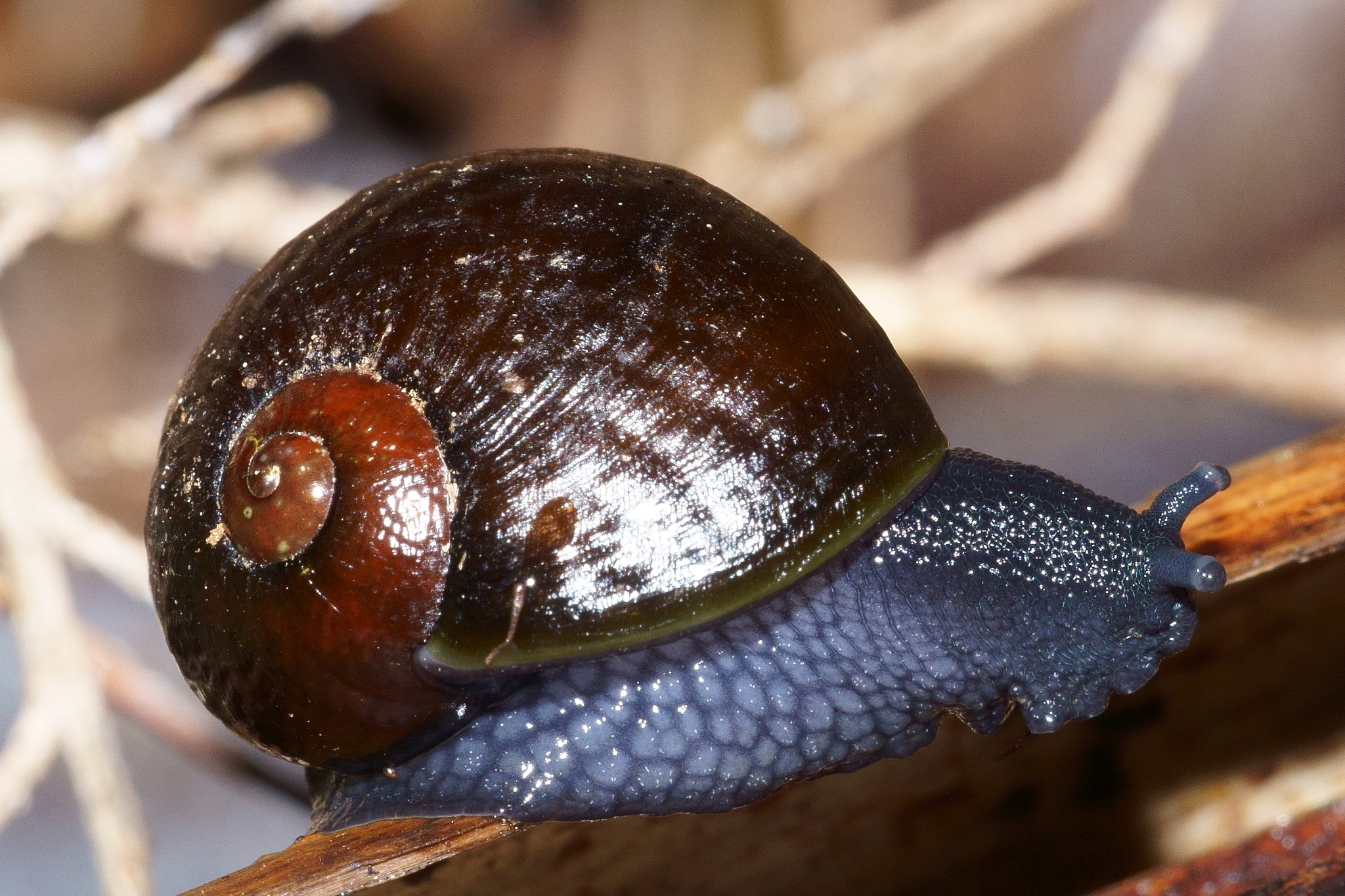
- Wainuia urnula

Scientific classification
- Kingdom: Animalia
- Phylum: Mollusca
- Class: Gastropoda
- Order: Stylommatophora
- Superfamily: Rhytidoidea
- Family: Rhytididae
- Subfamily: Rhytidinae
- Genus: Wainuia; Powell, 1930

Type species
- Helix urnula

= Wainuia =

Genus of land snails

Wainuia is a genus of air-breathing predatory land snails, terrestrial pulmonate gastropod molluscs in the family Rhytididae. Species in this genus are endemic to New Zealand, and are carnivorous, primarily predating on amphipods and earthworms. Many members of the genus are at risk of extinction, including W. clarki, which has been impacted due to predation by introduced species including rats, song thrushes and hedgehogs, as well as drying forest floor habitats.

== Description ==
In the original description, Powell described the genus as below:

The radula has a relatively small number of teeth per row and the outermost lateral is only half the size of the second lateral from the margin, which is the largest; the remaining teeth diminish in size to the centre. These features are also common to Rhytida but not to Paryphanta in which a much greater number of teeth are present per row and these differ in gradually increasing in size from the margin and decreasing again towards the centre. The radula of Wainuia differs from that of Rhytida in all the teeth being long, slender and similarly shaped...the shell of Wainuia is characterized by being thin, black, malleated and composed almost entirely of conchin.

The width of the shell of Wainuia ranges between 21–38 mm (0.83–1.50 in). The genus has an olive-brown periostracum, a weakly calcareous shell primarily made of conchin, that has radially-oriented diagonal cords on the periphery that extend on the upper shell surface towards the suture.

Members of the genus are difficult to distinguish based on shell patterns, and are typically identified by their size differences and geographic distributions. Wainuia can be distinguished from Rhytida due to members of Wainuia having a thin, very darkly-coloured shell.

== Taxonomy ==
The genus was first described by A. W. B. Powell in 1930, who noted two species had features similar to but distinct from Rhytida and Paryphanta: W. urnula (formerly known as Helix urnula or Paryphanta urnula) and W. edwardi (formerly Paryphanta edwardi). Powell named the genus after the Lower Hutt suburb Wainuiomata. In 1977, Frank Climo described Wainuia as a subgenus of Rhytida, which was not accepted by Powell, who continued to describe Wainuia as a distinct genus in 1979. Powell's interpretation was supported by phylogenetic analysis undertaken in 2002.

In 1936, Powell described a new species, W. clarki, and by the subspecies W. urnula nasuta and W. fallai in 1946. In 2002, phylogenetic analysis led to W. urnula nasuta being raised to species level, and W. fallai becoming synonymised with W. edwardi.

== Ecology ==
Species of the genus Wainuia are carnivorous. The preferred prey of W. edwardi, W. clarki and W. urnula are amphipods, especially Parorchestia tenuis, while W. nasuta has a more varied diet that includes both earthworms and amphipods. Wainuia have eggs with a calcareous surface which lacks cuticle.

W. clarki populations are at-risk due to predation by Norway rats, ship rats, song thrushes and hedgehogs, as well as forest floor habitats becoming drier. Wainuia "Mount Oxford", known from Canterbury, may represent an undescribed species within Wainuia.

== Distribution and habitat ==
The genus is endemic to New Zealand.

== Conservation status ==
Under the New Zealand Threat Classification System, one species in the genus is listed as "Nationally Critical", two as "Declining", and one as "Not Threatened".

== Species ==
Species within the genus Wainuia include:

- Wainuia clarki A. W. B. Powell, 1936, central North Island
- Wainuia edwardi (Suter, 1899), Canterbury and West Coast, South Island
- Wainuia nasuta A. W. B. Powell, 1946, Tasman District and Marlborough District, South Island, D'Urville Island
- Wainuia urnula (Reeve, 1854), southern North Island and Kapiti Island

Species brought into synonymy

- Wainuia fallai A. W. B. Powell, 1946: synonym of Wainuia edwardi (Suter, 1899)

== Gallery ==
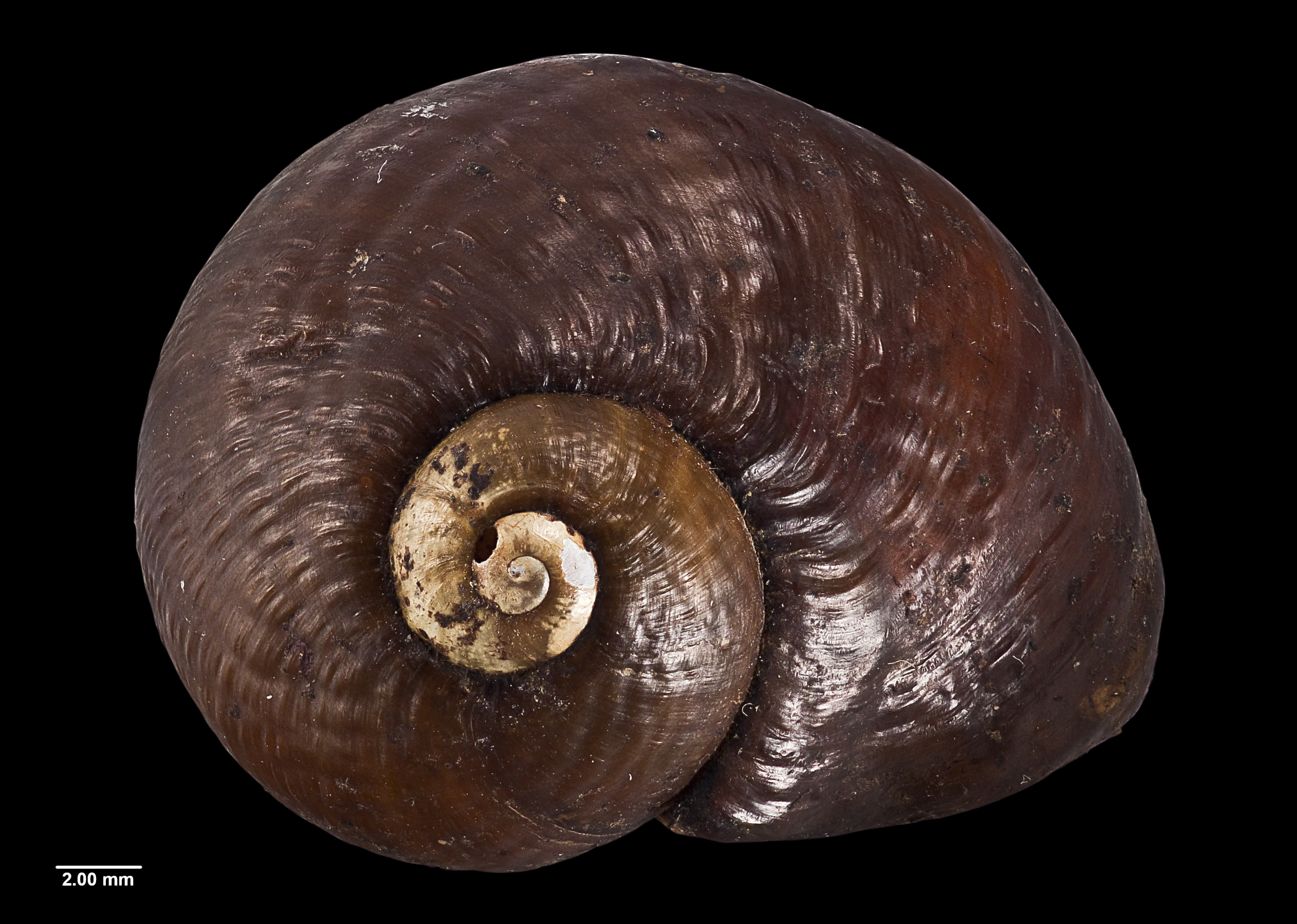
Holotype of W. clarki

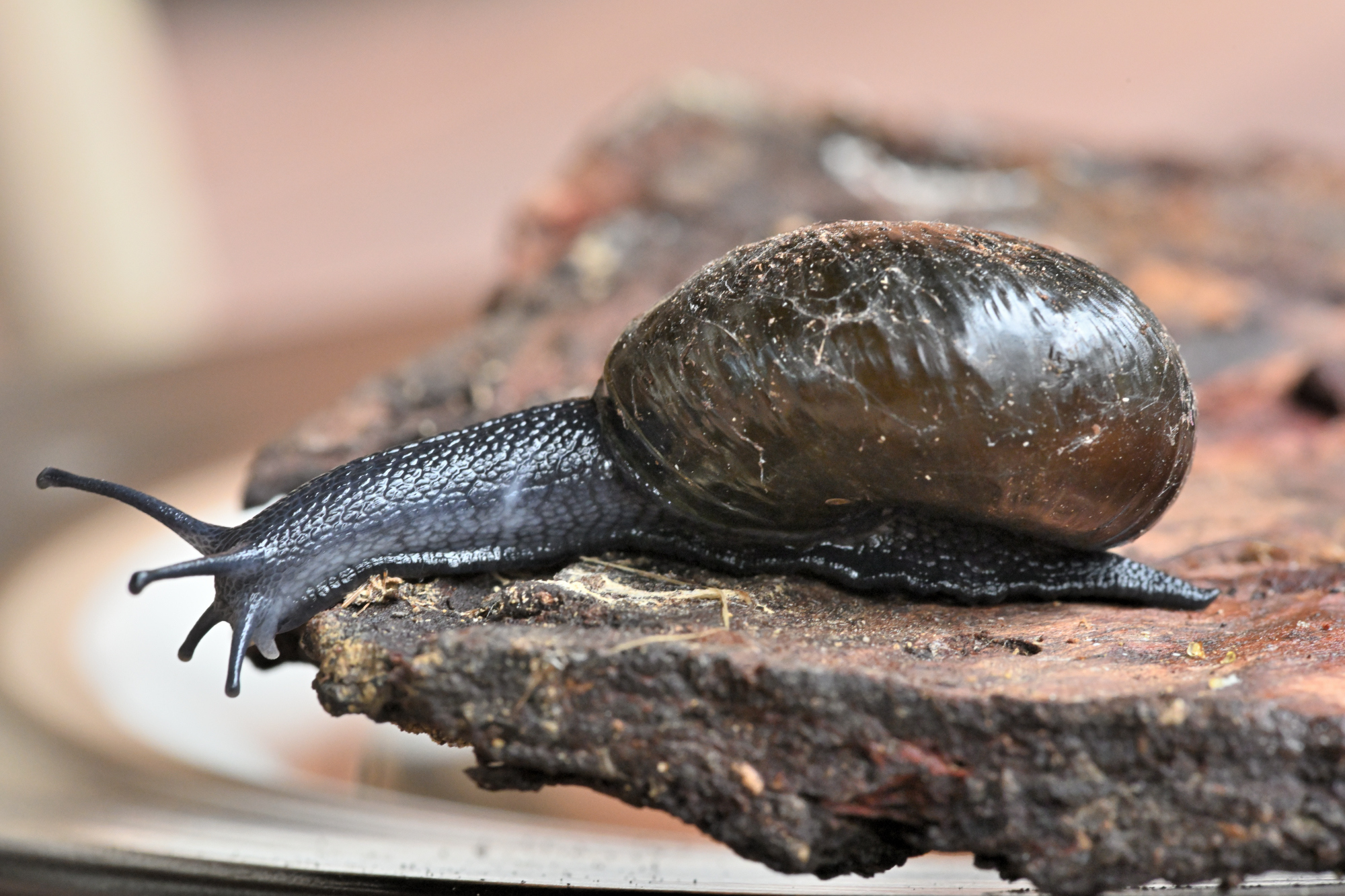
W. edwardi

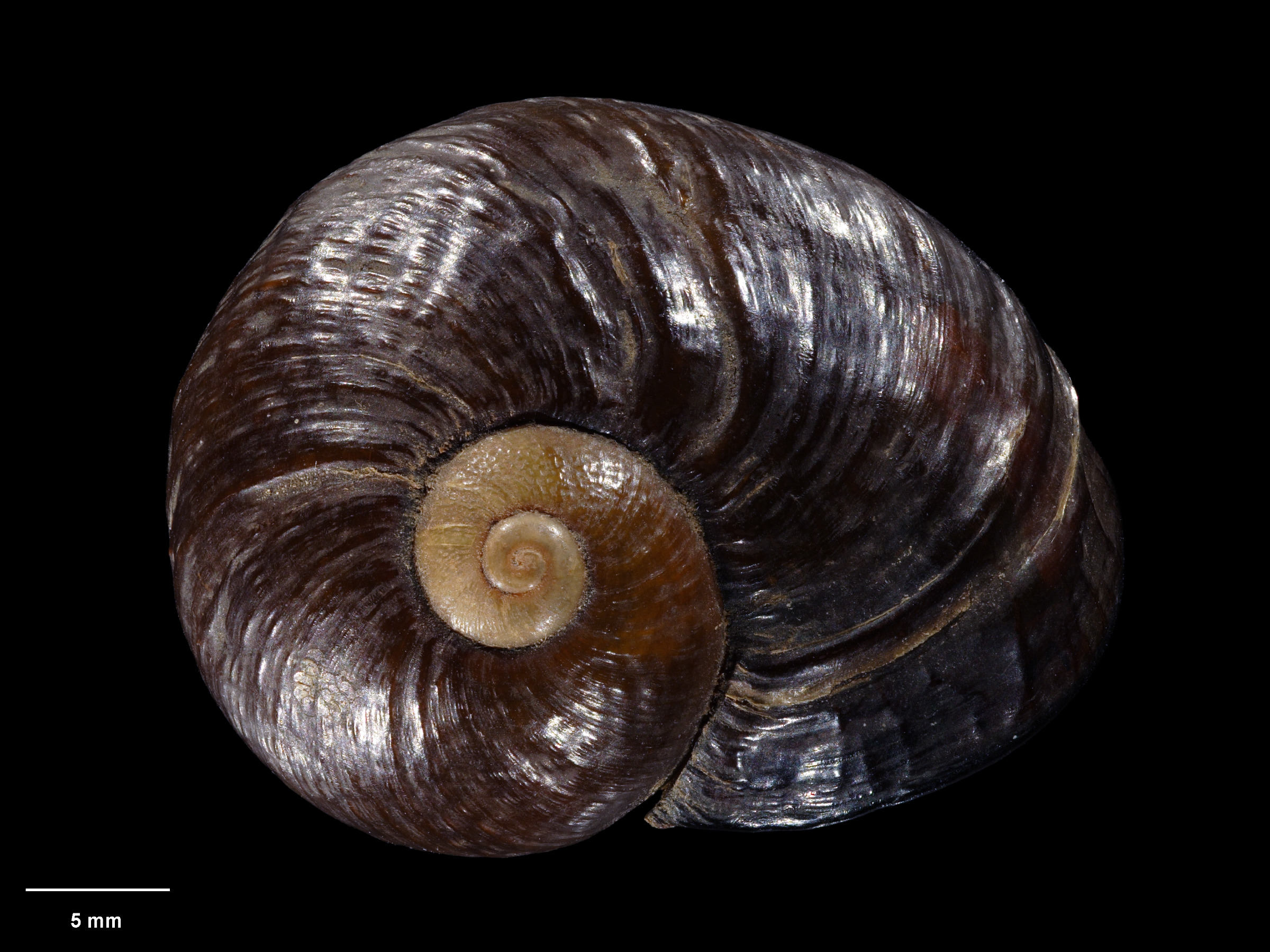
Holotype of W. edwardi

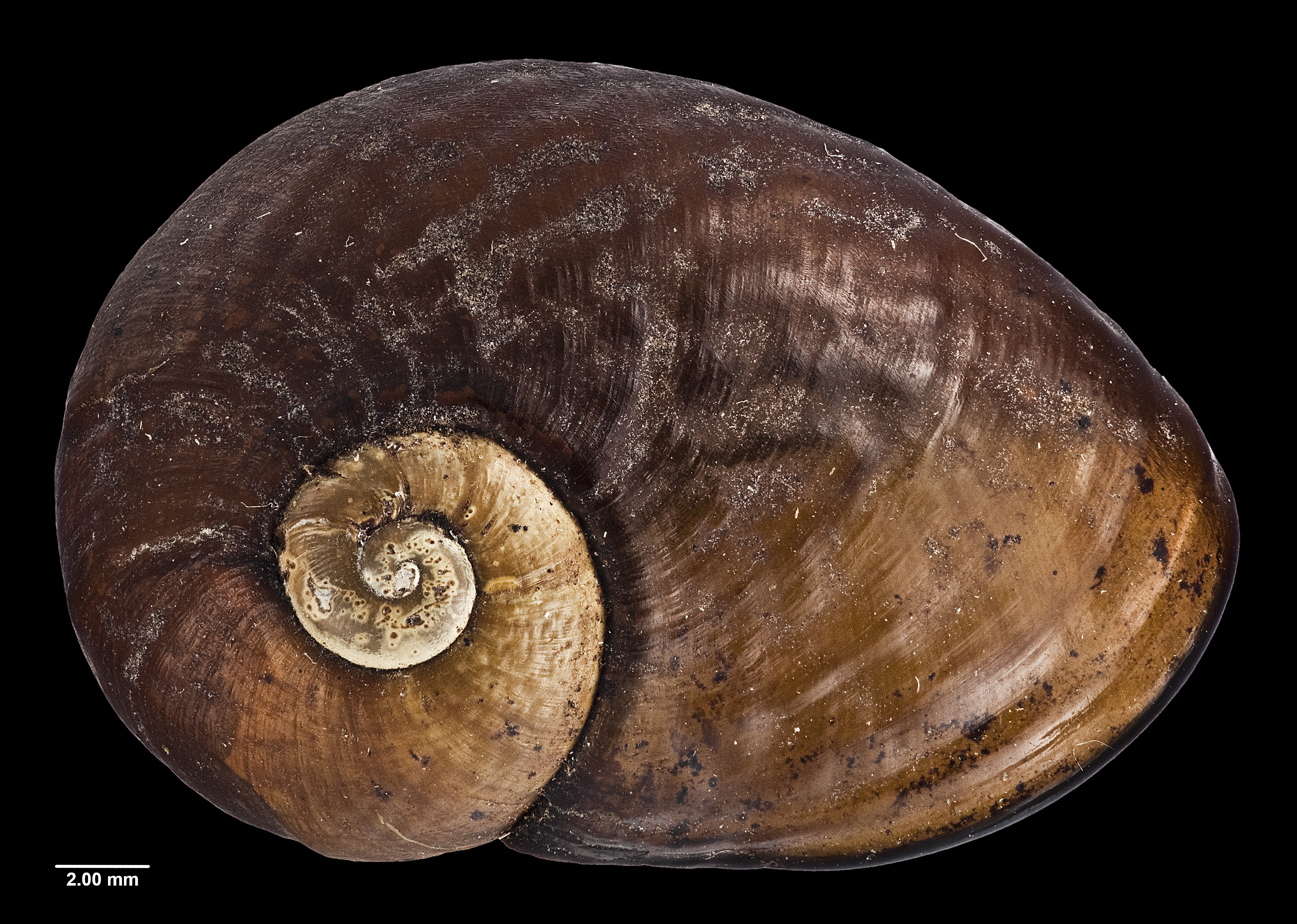
Holotype of Wainuia nasuta

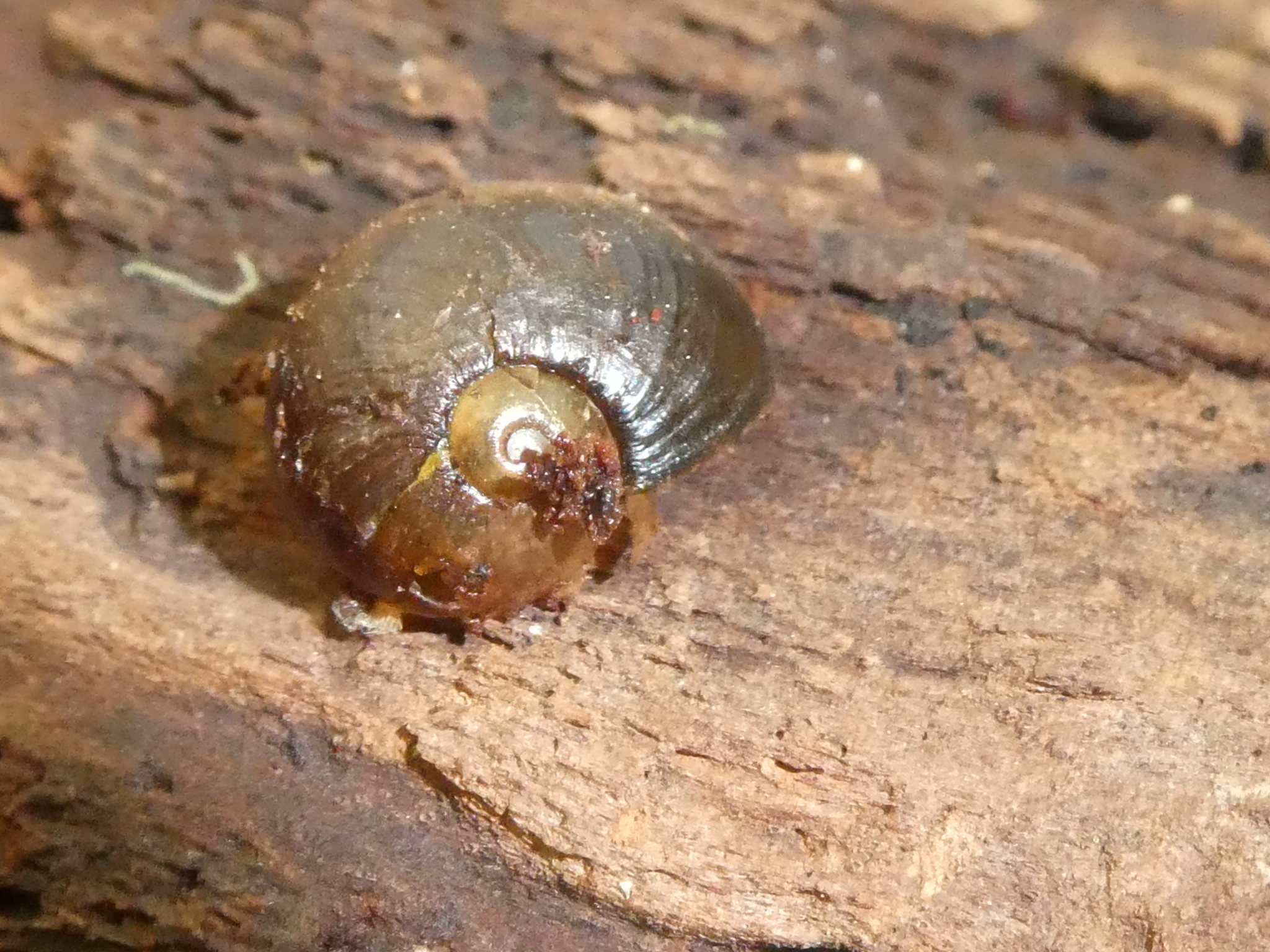
Shell of W. nasuta in the wild

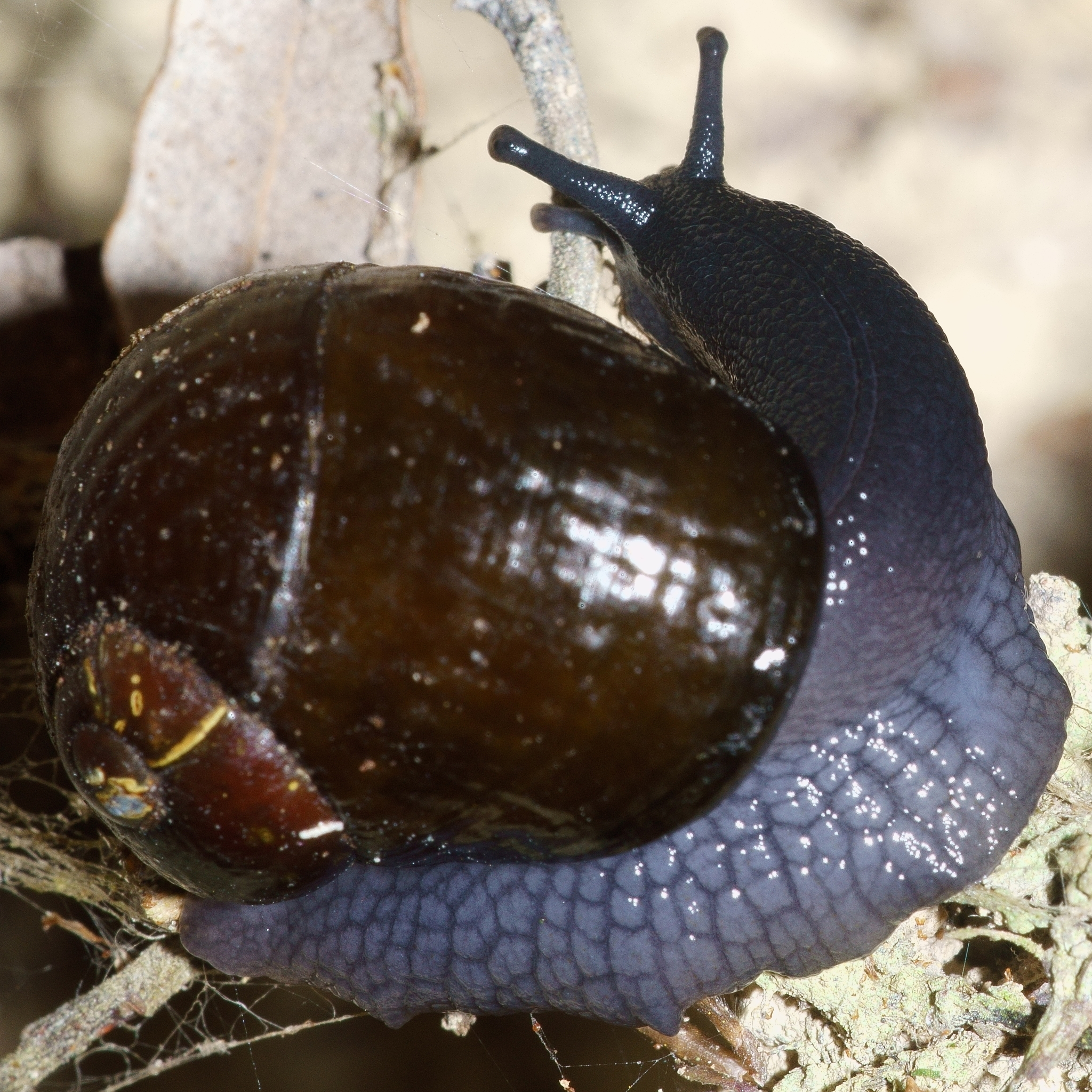
W. urnula

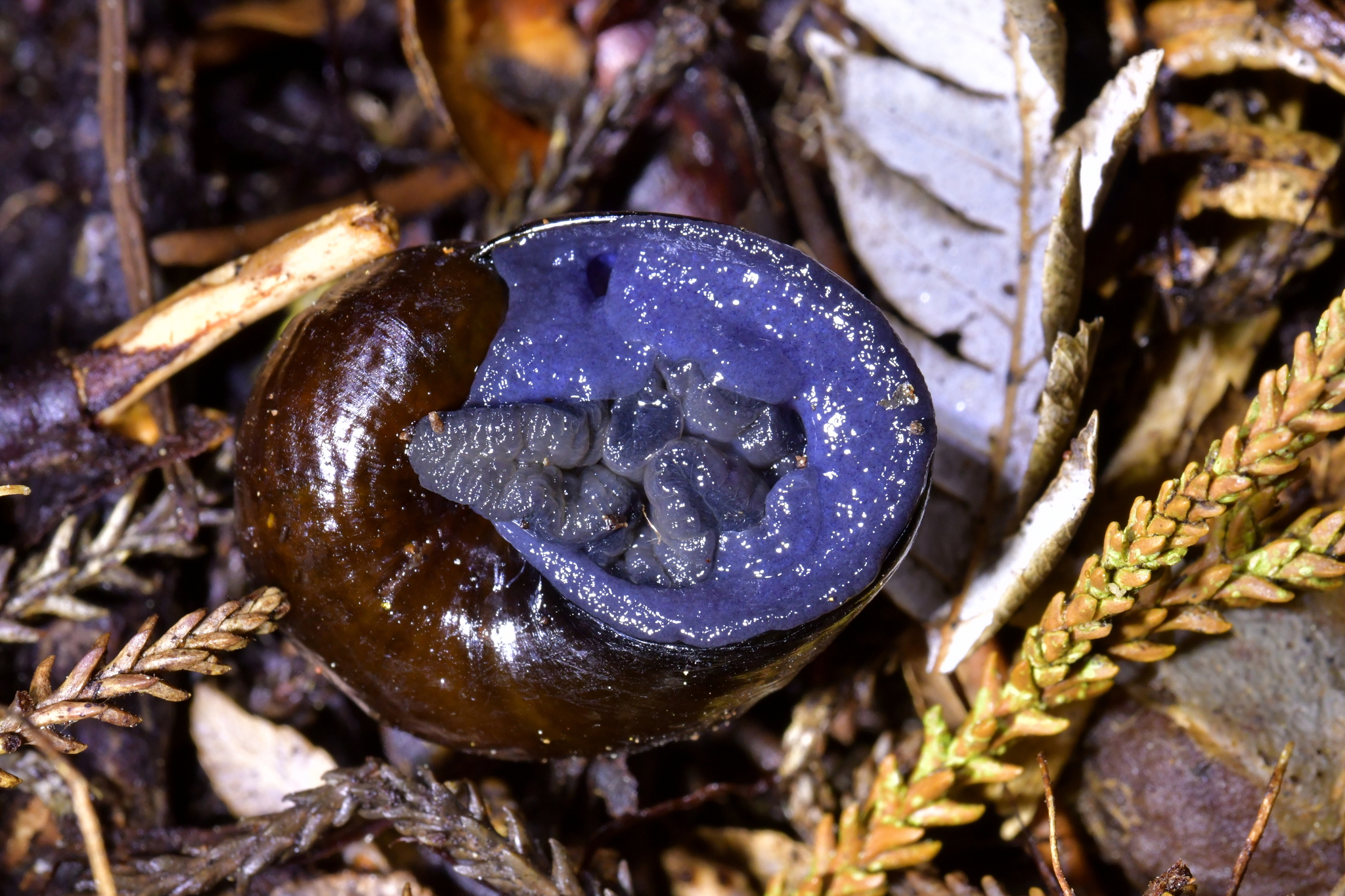
Overturned W. urnula
