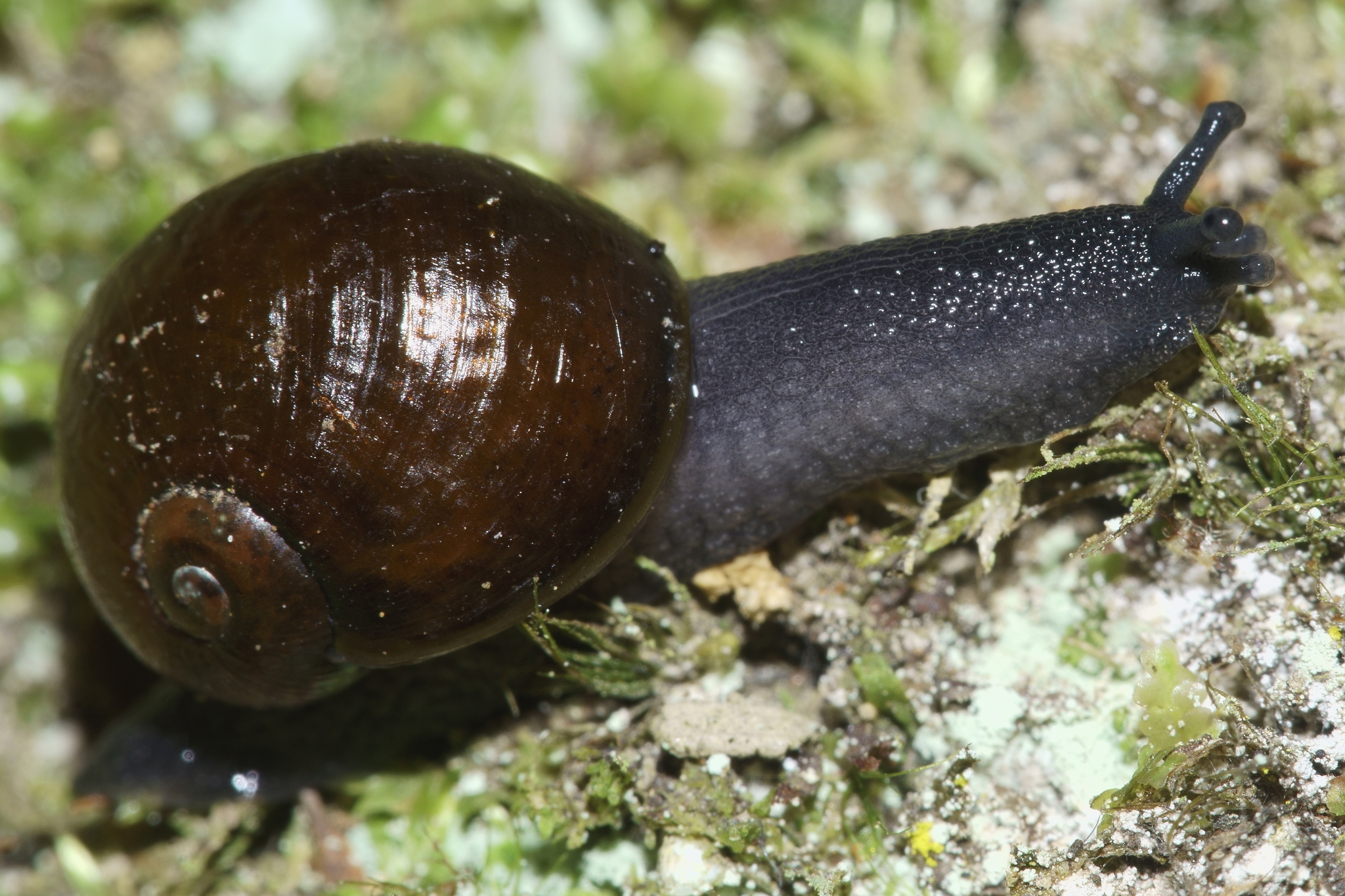

Scientific classification
- Kingdom: Animalia
- Phylum: Mollusca
- Class: Gastropoda
- Order: Stylommatophora
- Family: Rhytididae
- Genus: Wainuia
- Species: W. urnula

Binomial name
- Wainuia urnula (Pfeiffer, 1855)

= Wainuia urnula =

Species of gastropod

Wainuia urnula is a species of air-breathing predatory land snail, a terrestrial pulmonate gastropod mollusc in the family Rhytididae.

== Distribution and description ==
This species inhabits the North Island in New Zealand. Species is distinctively colorful with a large reddish patch in the umbilicus with the foot being of maroon color. Shells are relatively small when compared to sub fossil shells of the native island.

== Feeding habits ==
The diet of Wainuia urnula was found to contain amphipods (Parorchestia tenuis) in over 80% of snails sampled.

== Life cycle ==
Dimensions of a group of eggs of Wainuia urnula were: 5 × 4, 5 × 4, 5 × 4, 5 × 3.75, 4.5 × 3.5, 5.25 × 4.25 mm.
