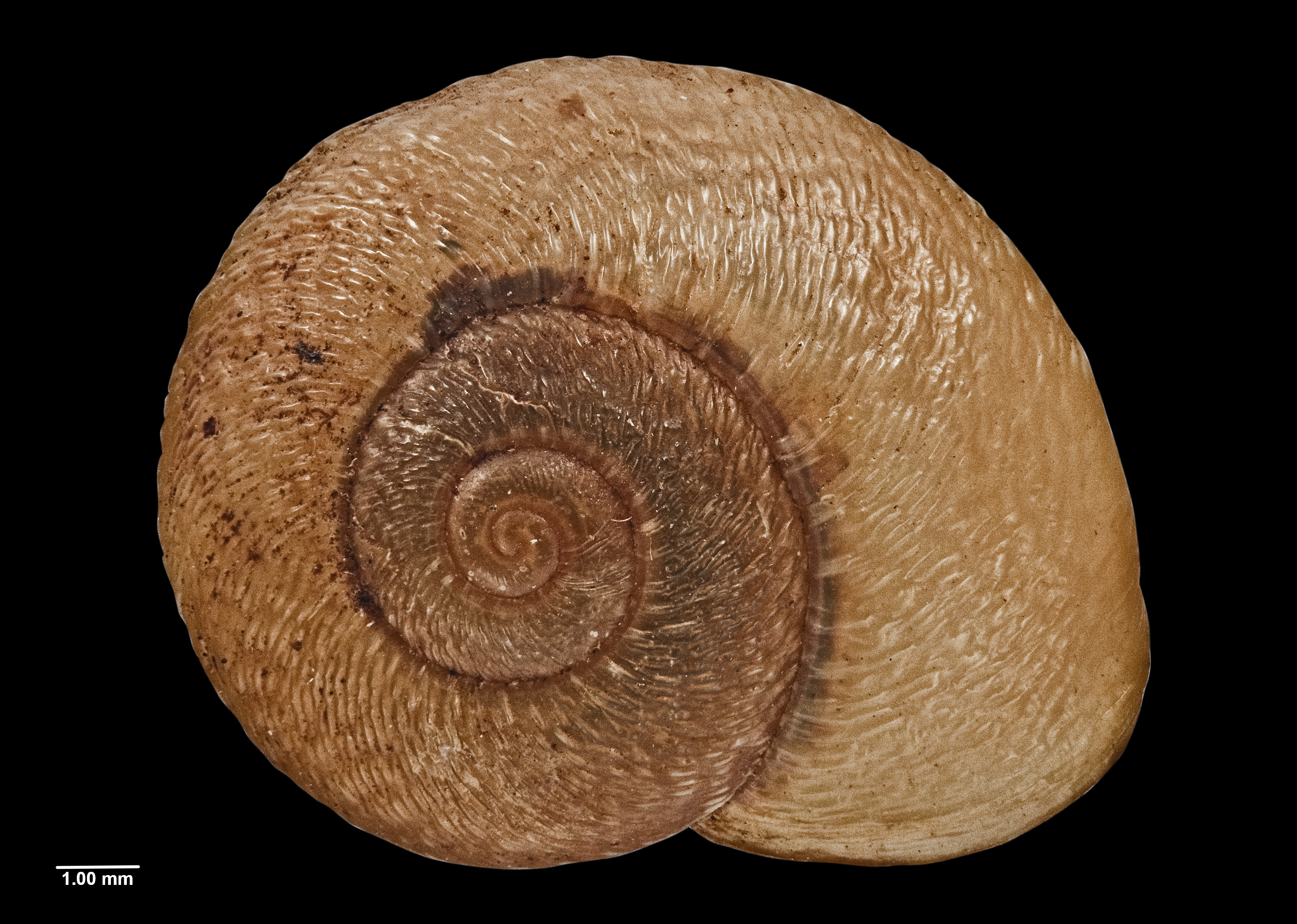
- Holotype from Auckland War Memorial Museum

Conservation status
- Declining (NZ TCS)

Scientific classification
- Kingdom: Animalia
- Phylum: Mollusca
- Class: Gastropoda
- Order: Stylommatophora
- Family: Rhytididae
- Subfamily: Rhytidinae
- Genus: Amborhytida
- Species: A. forsythi

Binomial name
- Amborhytida forsythi A. W. B. Powell, 1952

Synonyms
- Rhytida forsythi A. W. B. Powell, 1952; Rhytida (Amborhytida) forsythi (A. W. B. Powell, 1952); Rhytida (Amborhytida) dunniae forsythi (A. W. B. Powell, 1952)

= Amborhytida forsythi =

Species of land snail

Amborhytida forsythi is a species of land snail belonging to the family Rhytididae. First described in 1952, the species is endemic to the Northland Region of New Zealand, likely evolving on mainland Northland when other members of Amborhytida lived on former islands that existed during the Pliocene epoch.

== Description ==
In the original description, Powell described the species as follows:

This is a miniature relative of dunniae with an adult size of less than half the linear dimensions attained by that species. The egg also is approximately half the size of that of dunniae. The peripheral carina is not so sharply keeled. The dentition resembles that of dunniae except for the central tooth, which is the same size as adjacent laterals, not half the size. Whorls 4, including a low rounded smooth protoconch of 14 whorls. Post-nuclear whorls sculptured, as in dunniae, with dense anastomosing radial wrinkles, These wrinkles are irregularly thickened at the periphery but interrupted or spaced, not fused into a continuous ridged keel as in adult dunniae. Umbilicus deep, about one-sixth diameter of the base. Colour uniformly fuscous.

The species measures 14 mm (0.55 in) by 7 mm (0.28 in), and has a 17+1+17 dental formula. It can be distinguished from A. dunniae due to differences in carination and dentition.

== Taxonomy ==
The species was described by A. W. B. Powell in 1952 as Rhytida forsythi. Powell named the species after D. G. Forsyth, who first noticed differences between A. forsythi and A. dunniae. It was moved to the subgenus Rhytida (Amborhytida) by Frank Climo in 1974, Amborhytida was raised to genus level in 1999.

The holotype was collected by Powell himself on 20 January 1950 from the Taipā River in Northland, and is held by the Auckland War Memorial Museum.

The species likely separated from A. duplicata between 1.9 and 6.6 million years ago, with A. forsythi likely evolving on mainland Northland (and other members evolving on islands that formed in the Pliocene).

== Distribution and habitat ==
The species is endemic to the Northland Region, New Zealand, in areas such as the Mangōnui Peninsula, the Maungataniwha Range, Herekino Forest and the Waipoua Forest. It tends to be found in volcanic or Late Cretaceous soil.

== Gallery ==
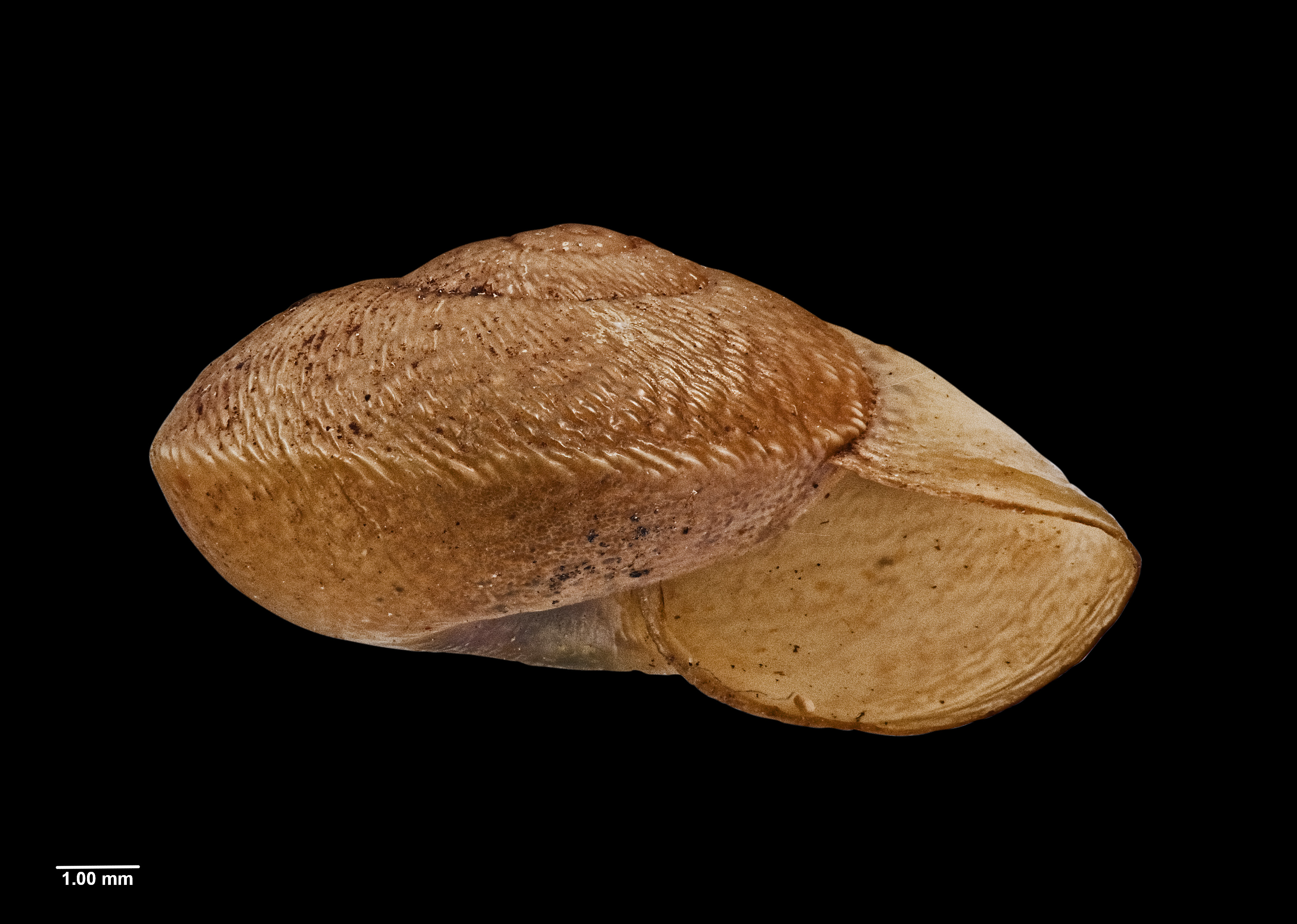
Side view of A. forsythi holotype

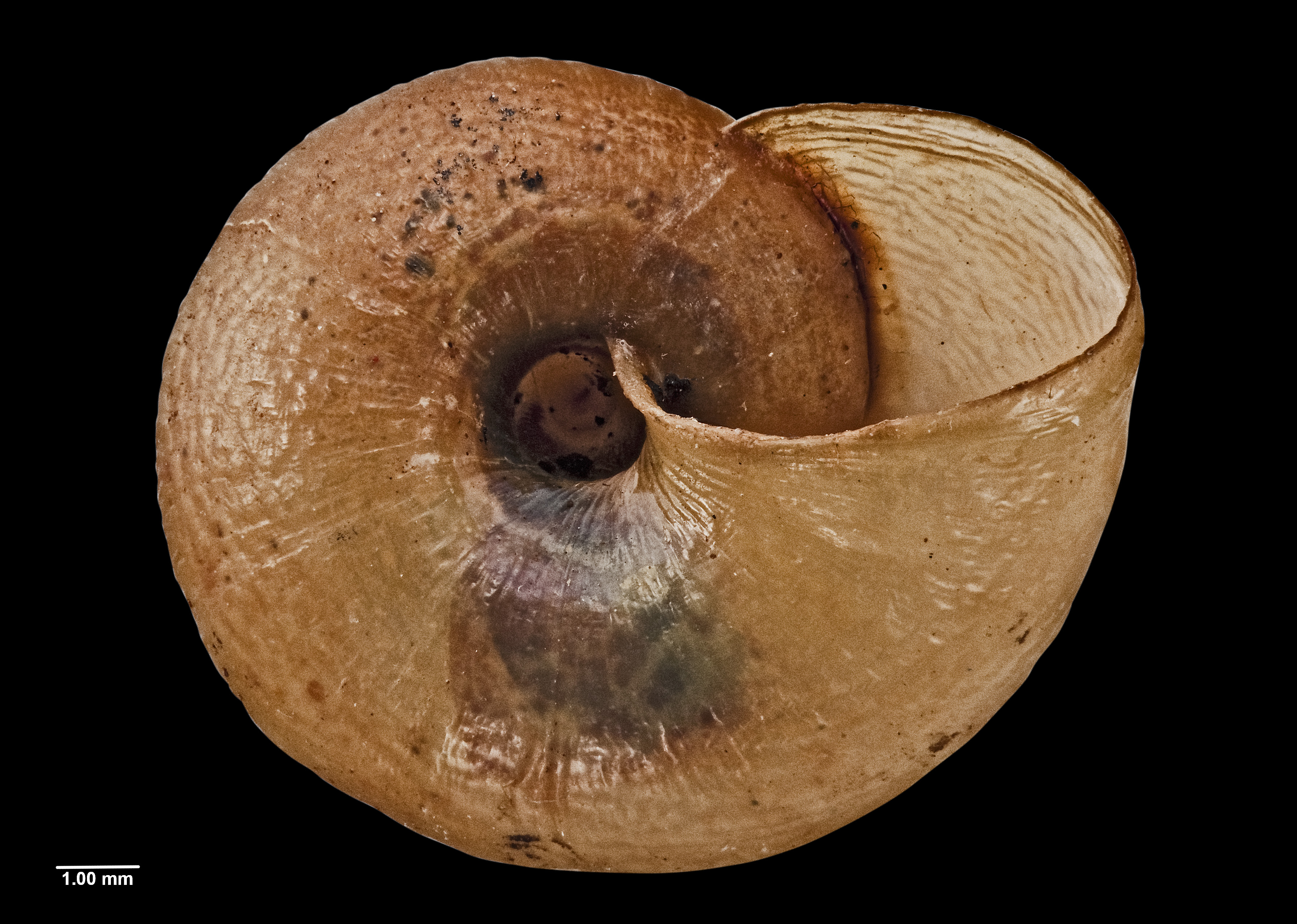
Underside view of A. forsythi holotype

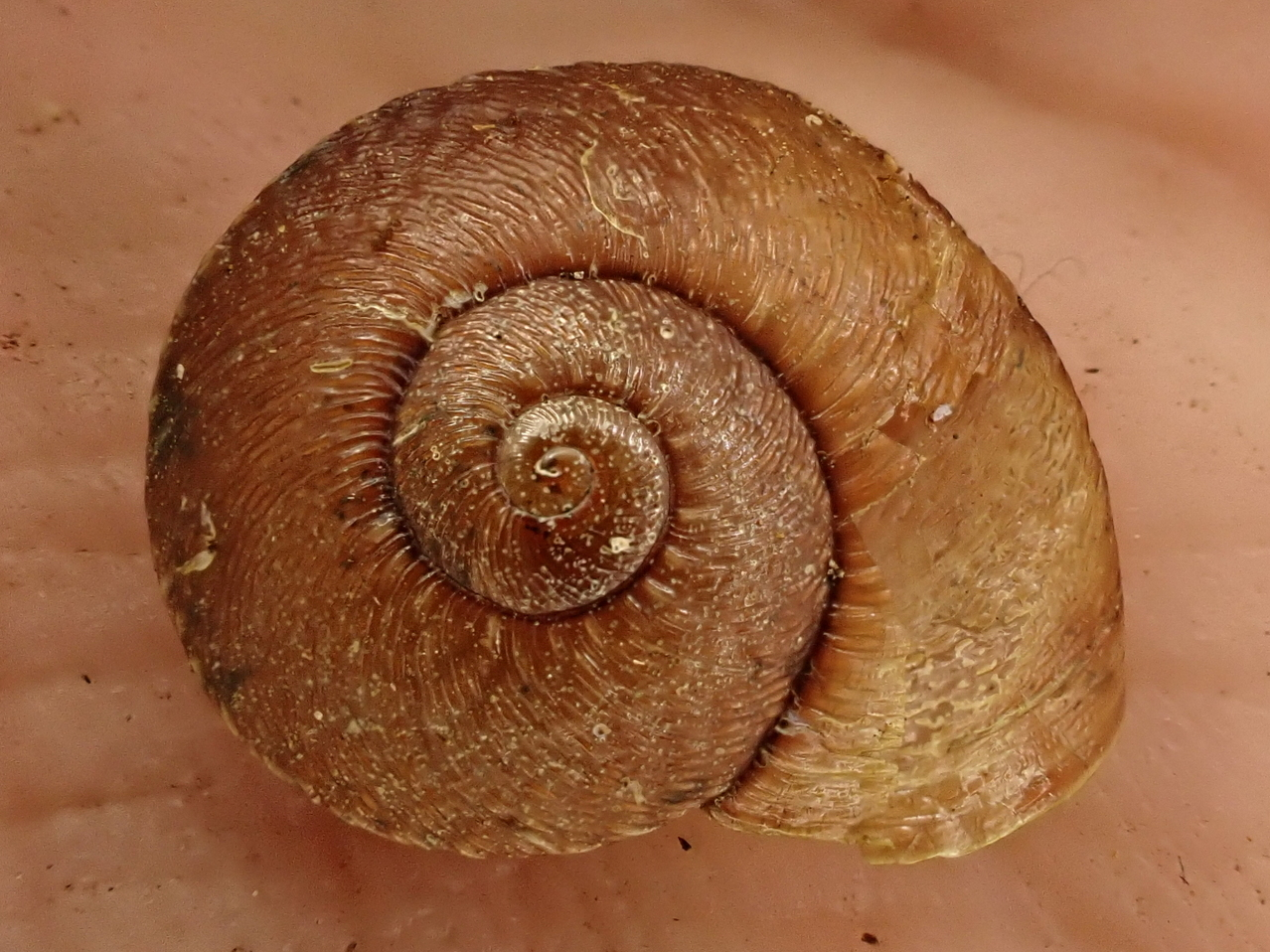
Shell found in the Waimā Forest, Northland
