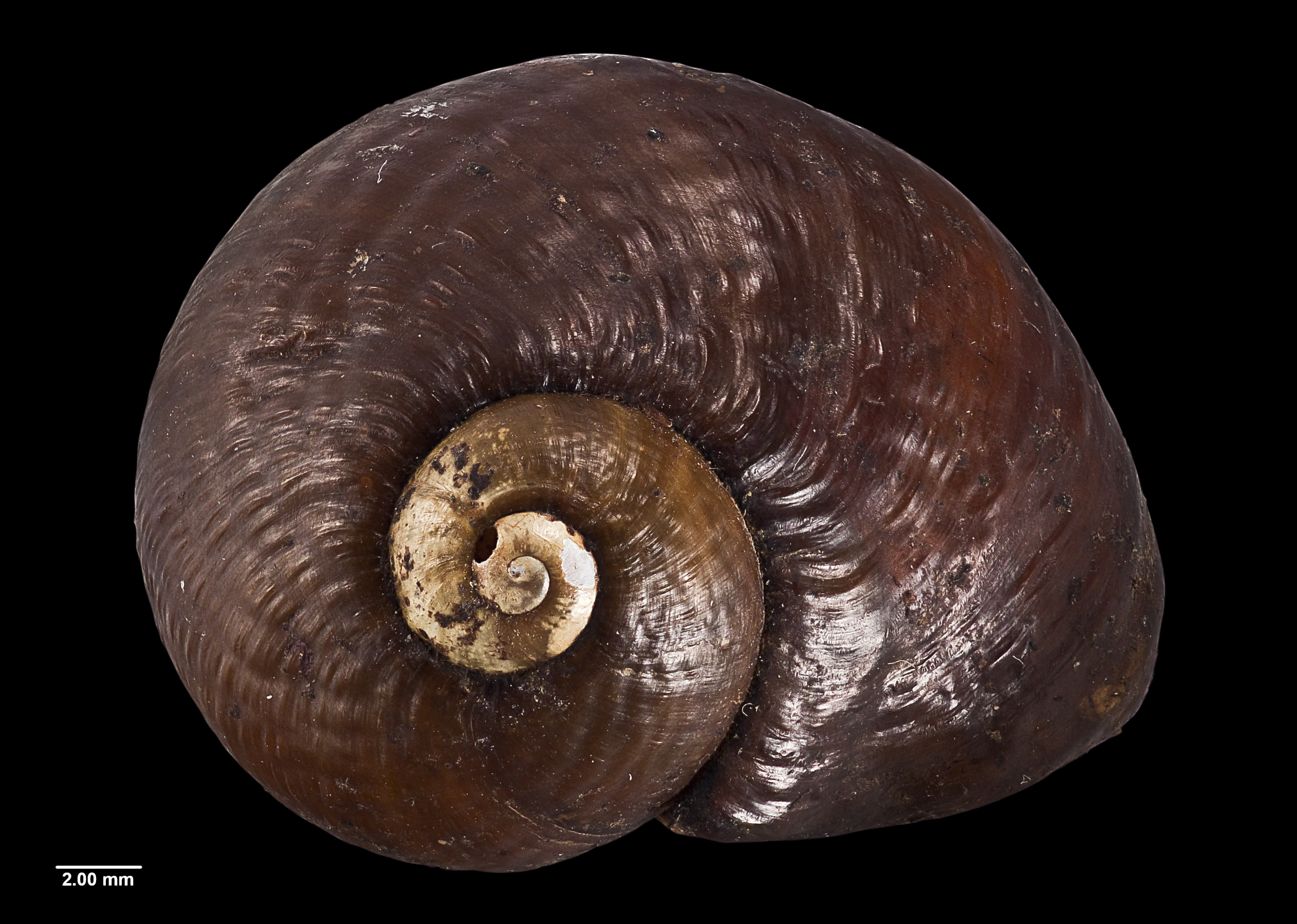
- Holotype from the Auckland War Memorial Museum

Conservation status
- Nationally Critical (NZ TCS)

Scientific classification
- Kingdom: Animalia
- Phylum: Mollusca
- Class: Gastropoda
- Order: Stylommatophora
- Family: Rhytididae
- Genus: Wainuia
- Species: W. clarki

Binomial name
- Wainuia clarki Powell, 1936

Synonyms
- Rhytida clarki

= Wainuia clarki =

Species of gastropod

Wainuia clarki is a species of air-breathing predatory land snail, a terrestrial pulmonate gastropod mollusc in the family Rhytididae.

== Distribution ==
This species occurs in New Zealand

== Feeding habits ==
Wainuia clarki feeds mainly on earthworms.

== Gallery ==
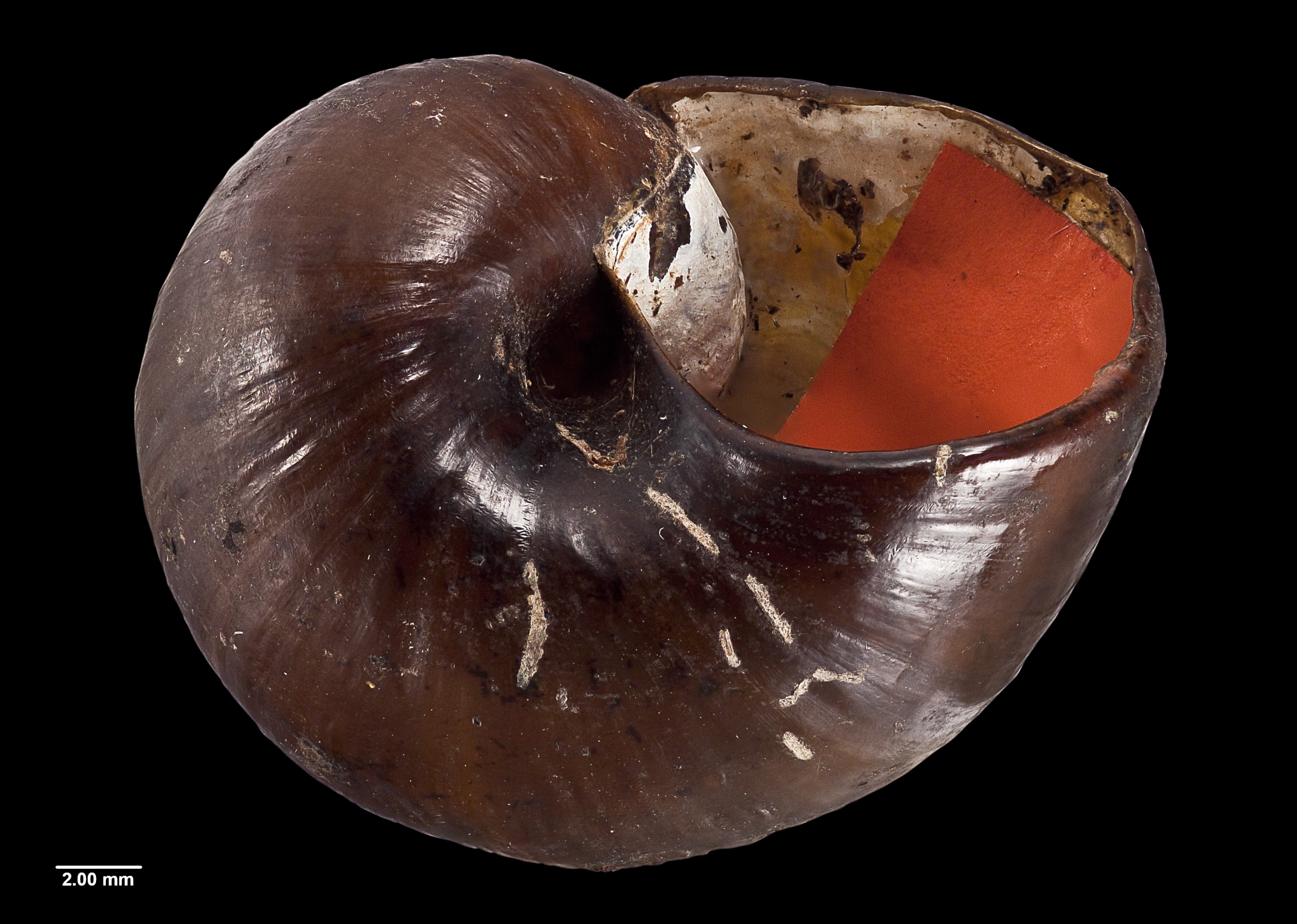
Underside view of holotype

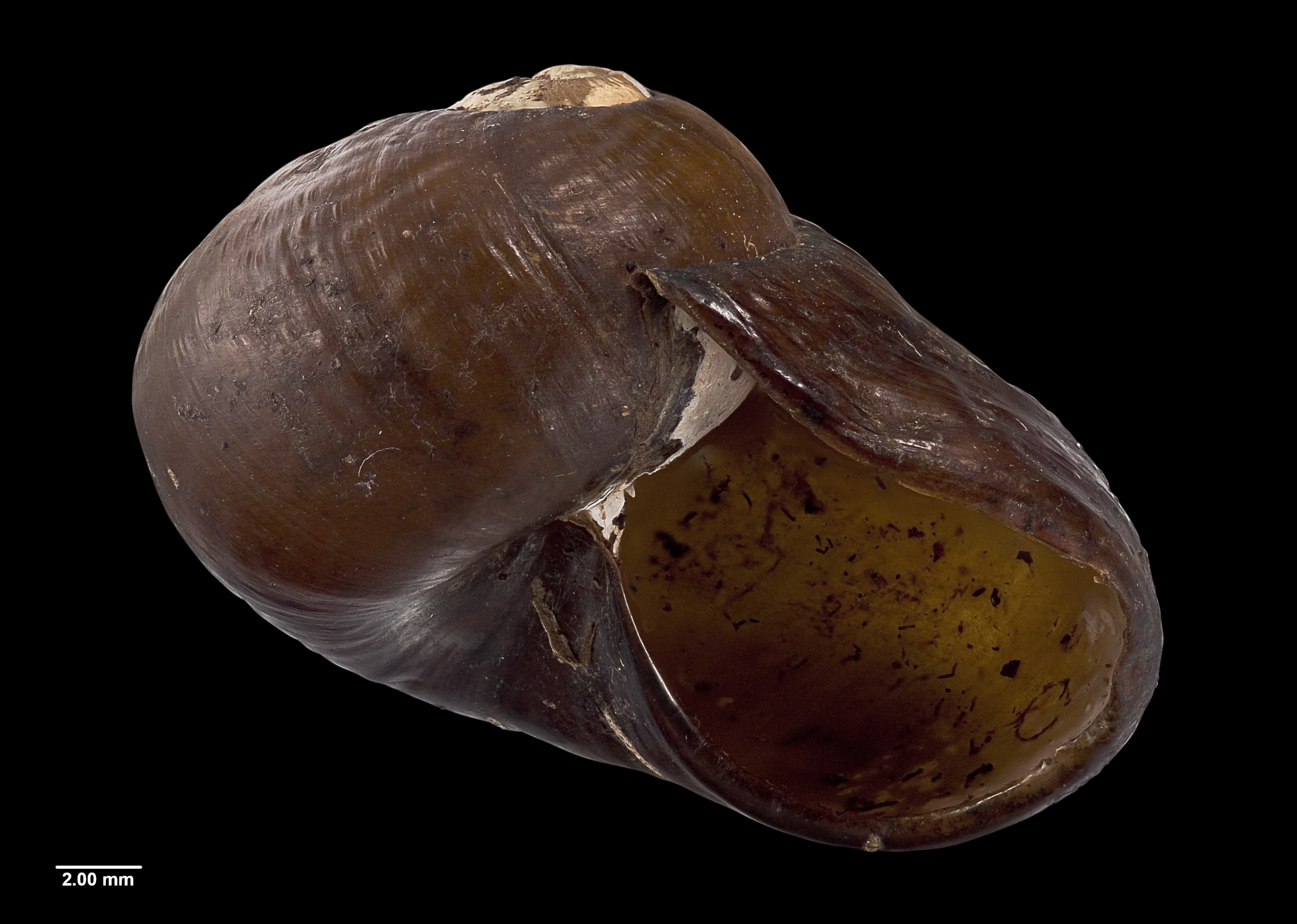
Side view of holotype
