= Parorchestia =

Scientific classification
- Kingdom: Animalia
- Phylum: Arthropoda
- Clade: Pancrustacea
- Class: Malacostraca
- Order: Amphipoda
- Family: Makawidae
- Genus: Parorchestia; Stebbing, 1899

Genus of crustaceans

Parorchestia is a genus of amphipods in the family Makawidae, containing the following species:

- Parorchestia ihurawao Duncan, 1994
- Parorchestia kinabaluensis Shoemaker, 1935
- Parorchestia lagunae Baker, 1915
- Parorchestia longicornis Stephensen, 1938
- Parorchestia luzonensis Baker, 1915
- Parorchestia tenuis (Dana, 1852)
