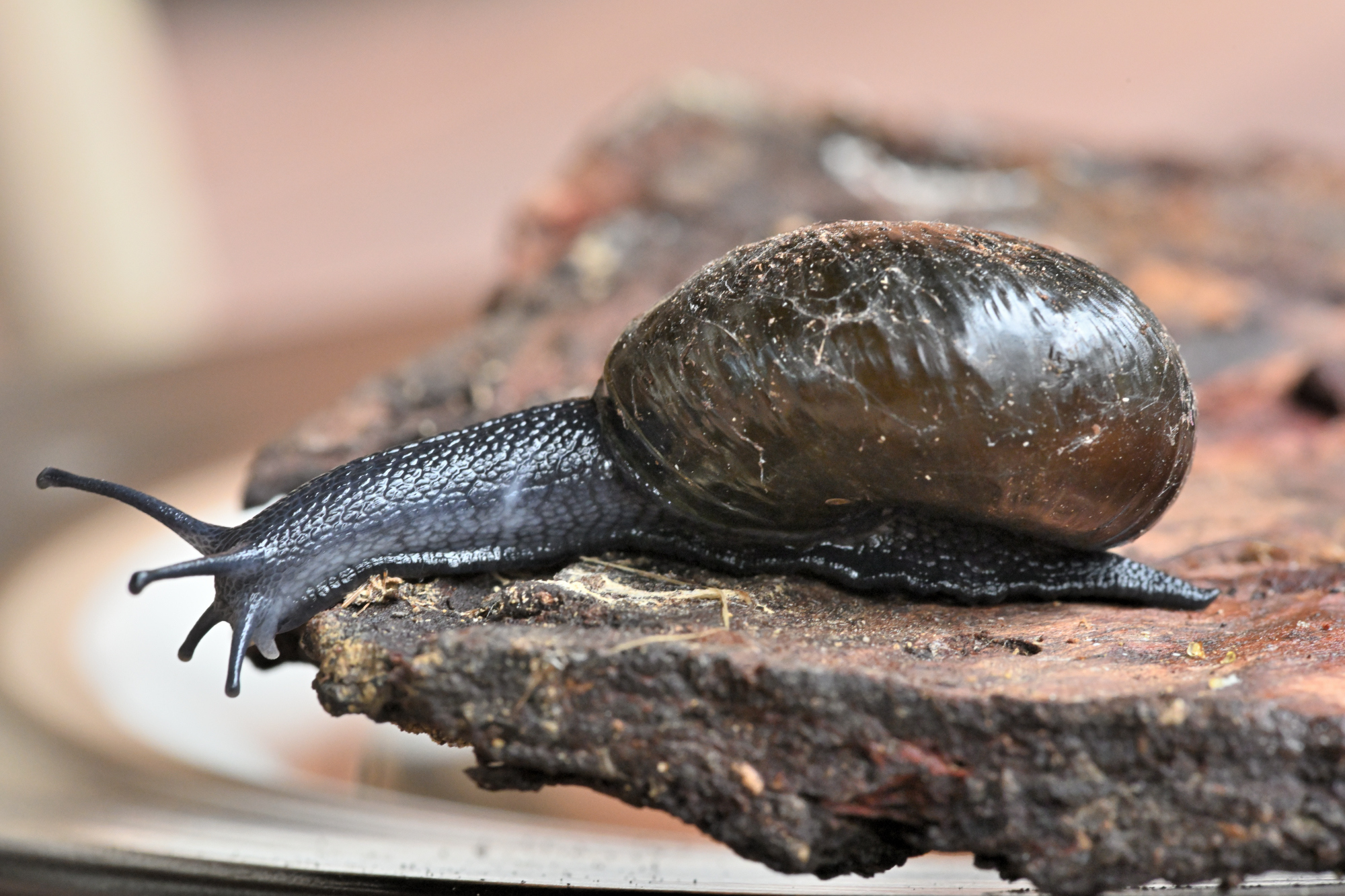

Scientific classification
- Kingdom: Animalia
- Phylum: Mollusca
- Class: Gastropoda
- Order: Stylommatophora
- Family: Rhytididae
- Genus: Wainuia
- Species: W. edwardi

Binomial name
- Wainuia edwardi Suter, 1899

Synonyms
- Paryphanta edwardi Suter, 1899; Wainuia fallai A. W. B. Powell, 1946

= Wainuia edwardi =

Species of gastropod

Wainuia edwardi is a rare terrestrial gastropod mollusc in the family Rhytididae, endemic to the South Island of New Zealand.

== Distribution ==
This species occurs in New Zealand

== Feeding habits ==
Wainuia edwardi feeds mainly on earthworms.

== Life cycle ==
Dimensions of eggs of Wainuia edwardi (?) are 5 × 3.75 mm.
