= Paryphanta watti =

Conservation status
- Nationally Critical (NZ TCS)

Scientific classification
- Kingdom: Animalia
- Phylum: Mollusca
- Class: Gastropoda
- Order: Stylommatophora
- Family: Rhytididae
- Genus: Paryphanta
- Species: P. watti

Binomial name
- Paryphanta watti Powell, 1946

Synonyms
- Paryphanta busbyi watti

Species of gastropod

Paryphanta watti is a species of large predatory land snail, a terrestrial pulmonate gastropod mollusk in the family Rhytididae.

== Distribution ==
Paryphanta watti is found in the Aupōuri Peninsula, at the northern tip of the North Island in Northland Region, New Zealand^{[1]} Location within the Aupōuri Peninsula include Te Paki, Kohuronaki and Unuwhao

Snails showed a preference for high elevation, with no live snails being found below a height of 120m and no snail shells found below 100m. It showed no preference for vegetation type, found distributed among the leaf litter of varying forest types, low scrub and other vegetation.

The type locality is New Zealand

== Description ==
The diameter of the shell in adult snails is up to 49.6–61.2 millimetres (1.95–2.41 in). The shell of juveniles can be anywhere between 10 and 45 millimeters (0.39-1.77 in) before snails begin to undergo change in developing adult shells. The aperture of snails has a hard ridge formed by the inward rolling of the edge in adults whereas in juveniles, it is instead replaced by a soft lip where the periostracum projects past the ostracum. The shell exhibits cryptic colouration, helping the snail blend in with the leaf litter and surrounding vegetation.

Left Lateral View of Paryphanta watti Shell	Right Lateral View of Paryphanta watti Shell	Ventral View of Paryphanta watti Shell

== Ecology ==
Paryphanta watti lives amongst the leaf litter, either occasionally on the surface or more commonly hidden under leaf litter. Snails were also seen under logs and rocks. These snails also live alongside other gastropods like Placostylus ambagiosus and other snails of the Rhytida genus.

Paryphanta watti are a nocturnal species, displaying hiding behavior during the day, hiding up to 10 centimeters (3.94 in) or more within leaf piles or hiding under up to 2.5 centimeters (0.98 in) under the leaf litter with individuals observed as deep as 12.5 centimeters (4.92 in) though uncommon. This hiding behavior displayed serves as both protection against its predators as well as preventing desiccation. Snails also tend to be more active when the weather is cool and wet, predominantly more apparent on the surface during the months of April to July and August to September. Their activity correlates with temperature and humidity, which also aids in the prevention of desiccation.

Paryphanta watti are carnivorous and predatory, feeding primarily on earthworms. These snails have also displayed predation of juveniles its own species (cannibalism) but there has been no evidence to suggest they feed on carrion. It may also be possible for these snails to feed on cooccurring snails but there has been no evidence to support this.

In observation, dead snails were most commonly found between the months of November to July, when conditions were warmer and drier conditions.^{[1]} Few dead snails were found during the months of April to July. No dead snails were found during spring. Some of these deaths were due to predation however the large majority of dead snails were identified by intact but empty shells, suggesting rates of desiccation that correlate with the conditions.

=== Life cycle ===
The eggs are laid in holes dug by Paryphanta watti, around 2 centimeters (0.79 in) in diameter and between 2-4 centimeters (0.79-1.57 in) in depth, before the eggs were covered in 5-10 millimeters (0.2-0.4 in) of soil with an indentation left on top. Eggs were laid at a rate of about 1 to 2 eggs per day. Each clutch of egg could contain up to 6 eggs per hole. Egg laying predominantly occurs in the months of November to February and from August to September. This seasonal pattern of egg laying and behavior for egg burying may be done to protect the eggs from predation as well as from desiccation.

Eggs were measured to a mean weight of 1.103 gram (0.039 oz) with the length up to 14.22 millimeters (0.56 in) and a width up to 11.219 millimeters (0.442 in). Egg shells were initially covered by a membrane consisting of a smooth and slightly adhesive, tough white layer. This layer disappeared after 1 – 2 days, exposing the hard, white, calcareous shell.

Snails are hatched from eggs with calcareous shell about 5–7.3 months after laying. Newborn snails live 2.8 months underground. Paryphanta watti appear to feed while still underground, an increase in mass being from water uptake and the increase in shell suggesting reserves in the snails being consumed. There is unreliable evidence for the growth rates juveniles until they have already grown three quarters of the way to maturity. It may take around 920 days to reach this stage, with the shell measuring 40-45 millimeters (1.57-1.77 in) in diameter. When snail shells reach a diameter of 45 millimeters (1.77 in), metamorphic changes occurs in the shell as they transition into adults. This changes takes a further 430 days before fully maturing. Total growth would be expected to take anywhere between 3 - 4.3 years. Mating predominantly takes place during cooler, wetter periods of the year between the months of April to September Mating occurs between pairs of snails. The majority of mating involves the upper snail having its foot attached to the shell of the snail, with the lower snail retreated into its shell though there are varying positions that mating can occur in the mating pairs. This process lasts between 4 – 7 days, with the pairs swapping positions at least twice, each snail on top for 1 – 2 days. After mating, there is a large variation in the time it takes for egg laying to occur afterwards, possibly between 52 and 140 days after mating.

The documented lifespan of Paryphanta watti is at least 4.1 years but it's possible they could live up to a minimum of 8.8 years.

=== Predators ===
Predators of Paryphanta watti include rats, mice and pigs. Damage to the outer whorl of the shell were attributed to predation by rats and mice, feasting on shells larger than 35 millimeters (1.38 in) in length. Predation by pigs lead to the complete crushing of snail shells, evidence on teeth marks and indentation on remaining fragments. There was also evidence of pigs rooting in soil and leaf litter for snails, suggesting predation on snails of all sizes. Unlike similar species, although they may be potential predator, there is currently no evidence to suggest Paryphanta watti is predated on by possums, mustelids or birds.

Although not predated on, snails are also occasionally killed by other animals. This was often caused by crushing of the snails by vehicles or by trampling from cattle.

== Conservation ==
Historically, the range of Paryphanta watti was much greater than it is today. Human activity have greatly reduced the range of these snails through the destruction of native forest on the Aupōuri Peninsula.

This species is protected by the Wildlife Act 1953.

Major threat to Paryphanta watti include predation and habitat loss. Predation by rats reduce the population of Paryphanta watti. Pigs predate on the snails as well as reducing the habitat of Paryphanta watti through rooting and distribution of the lead litter. Further large scale habitat loss are still present threats to the population of Paryphanta watti such as fire or the introduction of new predators to existing populations.

== See also ==
- Paryphanta busbyi
