= Woodcocks, New Zealand =

Woodcocks
- Interactive map of Woodcocks
- Coordinates: 36.449817°S 174.568921°E
- Country: New Zealand
- Region: Auckland Region
- Local board: Rodney Local Board
- Subdivision: Warkworth subdivision
- Electorates: Kaipara ki Mahurangi; Te Tai Tokerau

Government
  - Territorial Authority: Auckland Council

Woodcocks is a locality 15 km (9.3 mi) west of Warkworth in the Rodney District of New Zealand. It was named in honour of the Woodcock family who settled there around 1895.

Woodcocks train station was located on the North Auckland Line and provided for livestock and general freight, as well as passengers. It was opened in 1904 and closed in 1964, with all traffic redirected to Kaipara Flats station, 5 km further north. Woodcocks station was 100 km north of Westfield Junction, where the North Auckland Line meets the North Island Main Trunk Railway. Although little remains of the Woodcocks station, it was located between Guy Road and West Coast Road. The stationmaster's house is still on its original site, and is a private residence.
