= Parorchestia tenuis =

Scientific classification
- Kingdom: Animalia
- Phylum: Arthropoda
- Clade: Pancrustacea
- Class: Malacostraca
- Order: Amphipoda
- Family: Makawidae
- Genus: Parorchestia
- Species: P. tenuis

Binomial name
- Parorchestia tenuis (Dana, 1852)

Synonyms
- Allorchestes recens Thomson, 1884; Orchestia tenuis Dana, 1852

Species of crustacean

Parorchestia tenuis is a species of amphipod in the family Makawidae. It is "widespread and common" in New Zealand, and is only missing from Canterbury and North Otago.
