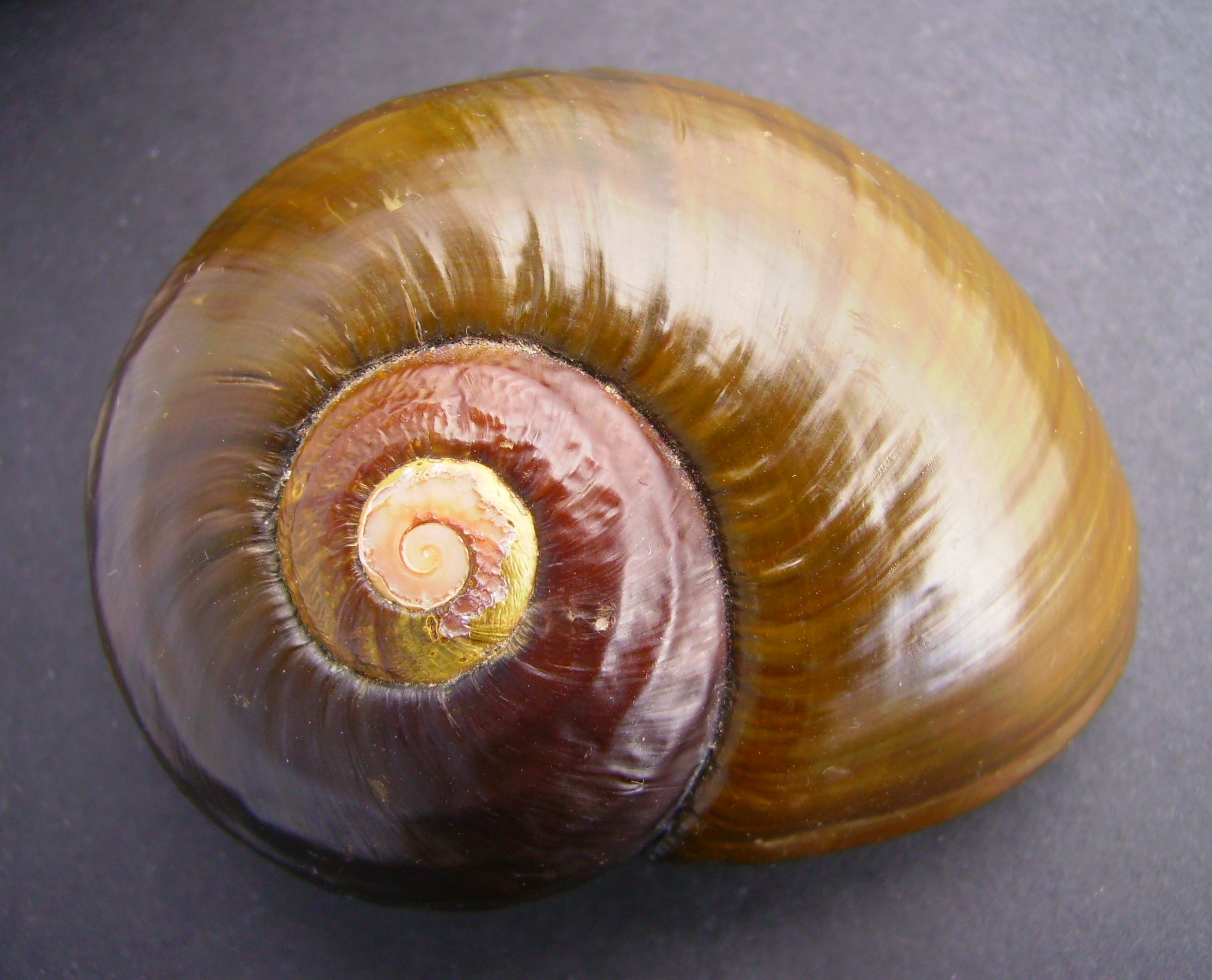
- Apical view of a shell of Paryphanta busbyi

Scientific classification
- Kingdom: Animalia
- Phylum: Mollusca
- Class: Gastropoda
- Order: Stylommatophora
- Family: Rhytididae
- Subfamily: Rhytidinae
- Genus: Paryphanta; Albers, 1850

Species
- See text.

= Paryphanta =

Genus of gastropods

Paryphanta is a genus of land snails in the family Rhytididae. Species from New Zealand are known commonly as kauri snails (Māori: pūpūrangi). They are closely related and similar to snails in the genus Powelliphanta, which was formerly included within Paryphanta.

There are just two species of Paryphanta: Paryphanta busbyi and Paryphanta watti, which occur from North Cape to West Auckland.

P. watti occurs only at the extreme northern end of this range near Kaeo. This form is of much darker coloration and often smaller, although does reach the same size as P. busbyi if allowed to reach old age. Classification of some land snails can be complicated by variations in shell induced by environmental changes.

== See also ==
- Paryphanta busbyi
- Paryphanta watti
