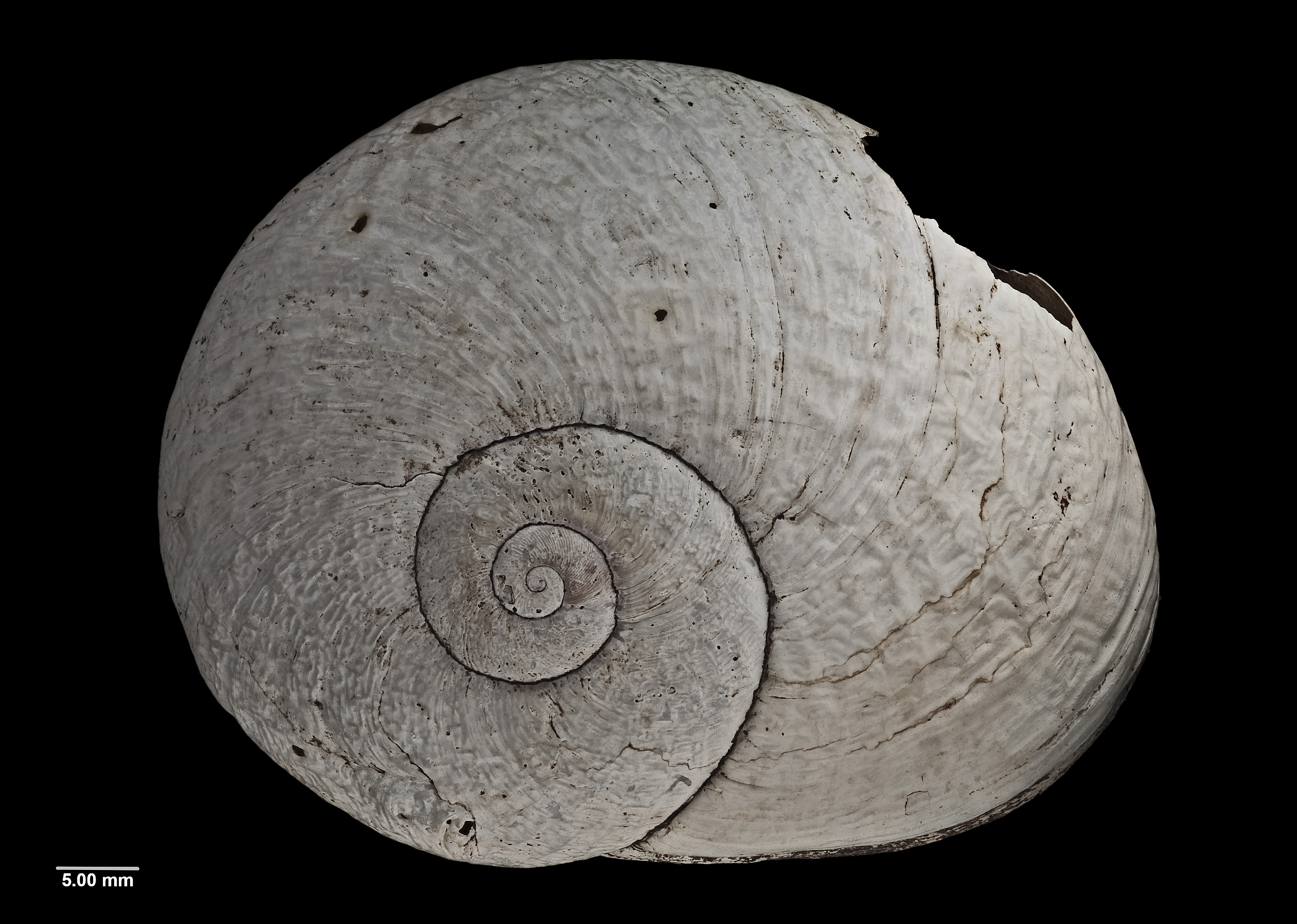
- Holotype

Conservation status
- Nationally Critical (NZ TCS)

Scientific classification
- Kingdom: Animalia
- Phylum: Mollusca
- Class: Gastropoda
- Order: Stylommatophora
- Family: Rhytididae
- Subfamily: Rhytidinae
- Genus: Rhytidarex
- Species: R. buddlei

Binomial name
- Rhytidarex buddlei (A. W. B. Powell, 1948)

Synonyms
- Rhytida buddlei A. W. B. Powell, 1948; Rhytida (Rhytidarex) buddlei A. W. B. Powell, 1948

= Rhytidarex buddlei =

Species of land snail

Rhytidarex buddlei is a species of land snail belonging to the family Rhytididae. It is endemic to Moekawa / South West Island of Manawatāwhi / Three Kings Islands, New Zealand, and is at risk of extinction, with only between 50 and 100 individuals thought to be alive.

== Description ==
In the original description, Powell described the species as below:

Shell very large, larger than any other known species, thin and depressed with rapidly increasing whorls. Whorls 4½, including a protoconch of 1½ whorls (worn in only specimen). Periphery narrowly rounded, scarcely carinated. Umbilicus deep, gradate, one-sixth major diaimeter of the base. Surface badly worn but showing on the dorsal surface dense radial wrinkle-striae becoming malleated over the later whorls. The base from below the periphery is more or less smooth as in johnsoni. Spire about one-third height of shell. Traces of a thin brownish epidermis remain.

The shells of the species have a diameter of between 51–64 mm (2.0–2.5 in), and a height of 29 mm (1.1 in), making the species the largest known member across the genera of Rhytidarex, Rhytida and Amborhytida. The species can be differentiated from R. johnsoni due to its size, and by having more tight wound coiling and wider umbilicus.

== Taxonomy ==
The species was first described by A. W. B. Powell in 1948 as Rhytida (Rhytidarex) buddlei. It gained its current name when Rhytidarex was raised to genus status by Frank Climo in 1977. Powell named the species after Major Geoffrey Armstrong Buddle, one of the two collectors of the holotype, in recognition of his natural history collections and observations in Manawatāwhi / Three Kings Islands. The holotype of the species is held by the Auckland War Memorial Museum.

Other than the holotype, no specimens of the species were found until the mid-1990s.

== Ecology ==
The species likely takes several years to attain its adult size. While the diet and lifestyle of the species is unknown, it likely preys on invertebrates.

== Distribution and habitat ==
R. buddlei is endemic to Moekawa / South West Island of the Manawatāwhi / Three Kings Islands, New Zealand. Widespread across Moekawa / South West Island during the 18th century, by 2002 the species had become restricted to an area of approximately 0.03 ha (0.074 acres), likely due to the expansion of Meryta sinclairii on the island. The species typically lives in mixed broadleaf shrubland, found in leaf litter underneath Phormium and similar species.

== Conservation status ==
Under the New Zealand Threat Classification System, this species is listed as "Nationally Critical". By 2002, only an estimated 50-100 individuals remained.

== Gallery ==
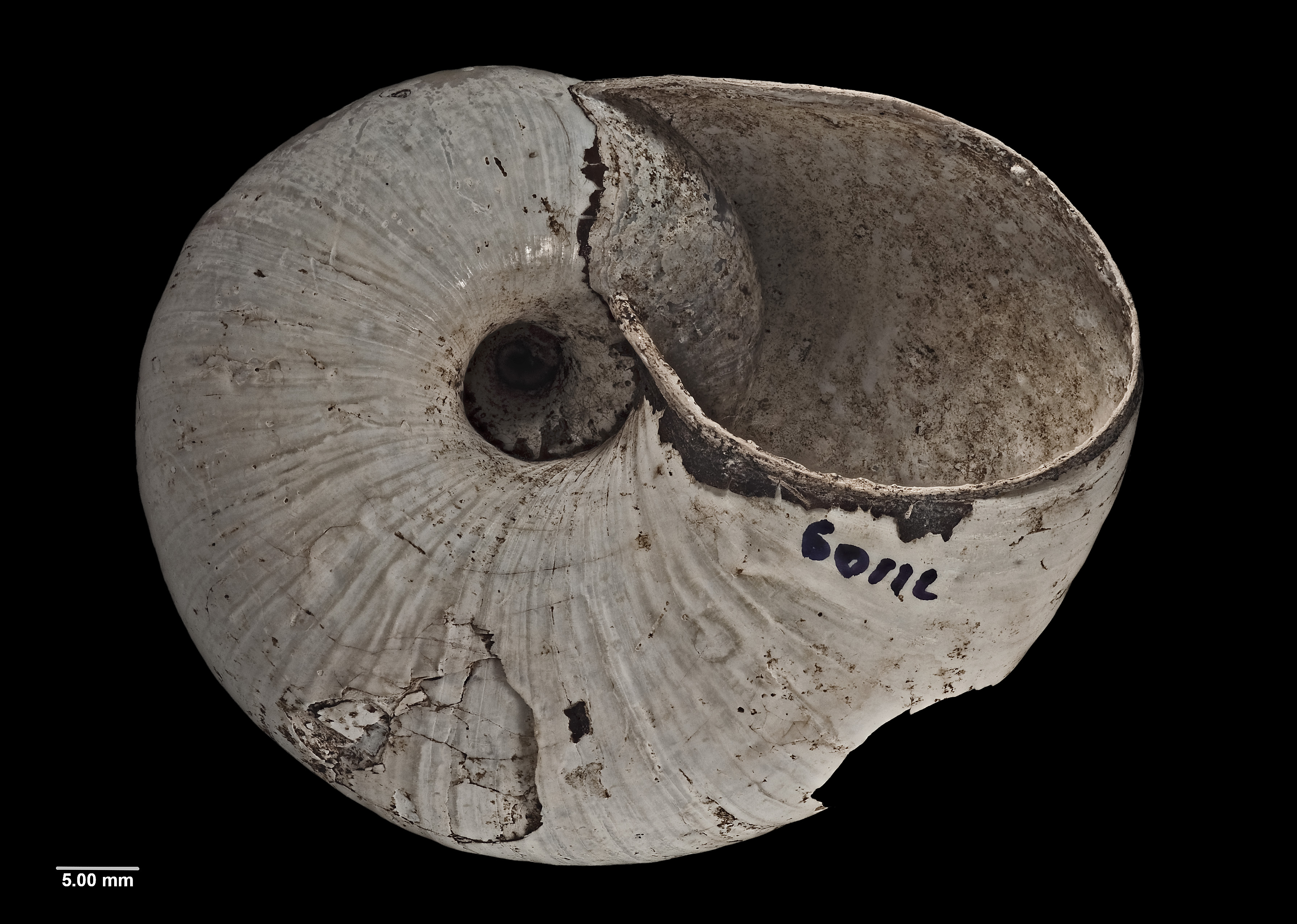
Underside view of holotype

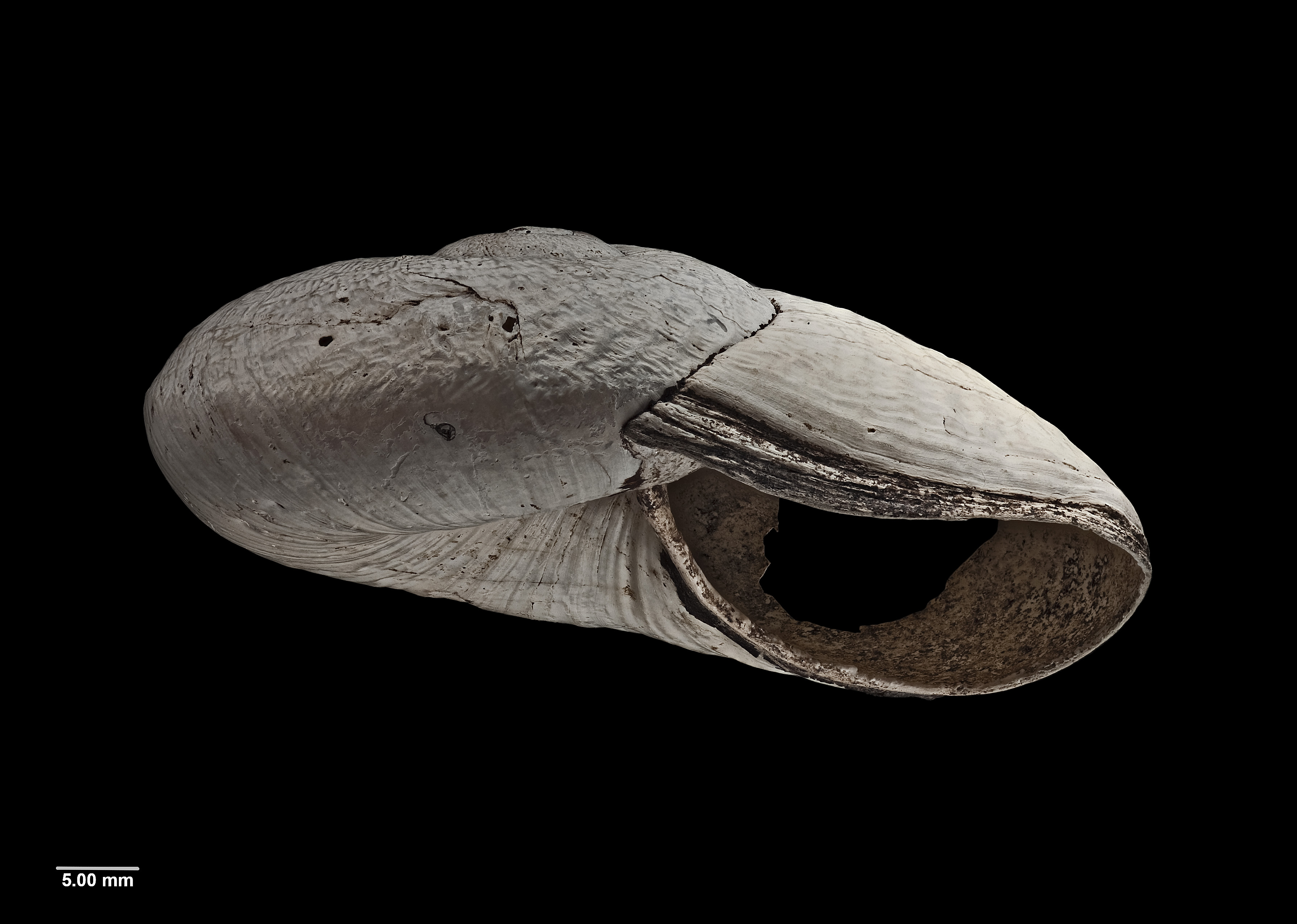
Side view of holotype
