= Delos oualanensis =

Conservation status
- Data Deficient (IUCN 2.3)

Scientific classification
- Kingdom: Animalia
- Phylum: Mollusca
- Class: Gastropoda
- Order: Stylommatophora
- Family: Rhytididae
- Genus: Delos
- Species: D. oualanensis

Binomial name
- Delos oualanensis (Pease)

Synonyms
- Charopa ualanensis Möllendorff, 1900; Helix oualanensis Pease, 1866

Species of gastropod

Delos oualanensis is a species of air-breathing land snails, terrestrial pulmonate gastropod mollusks in the family Rhytididae.

This species is endemic to Micronesia.
