= Occirhenea georgiana =

Conservation status
- Endangered (IUCN 2.3)

Scientific classification
- Kingdom: Animalia
- Phylum: Mollusca
- Class: Gastropoda
- Order: Stylommatophora
- Family: Rhytididae
- Genus: Occirhenea
- Species: O. georgiana

Binomial name
- Occirhenea georgiana Quoy & Gaimard, 1832

Species of gastropod

Occirhenea georgiana is a species of medium-sized predatory air-breathing land snails, carnivorous terrestrial pulmonate gastropod molluscs in the family Rhytididae. This species is endemic to Australia.
