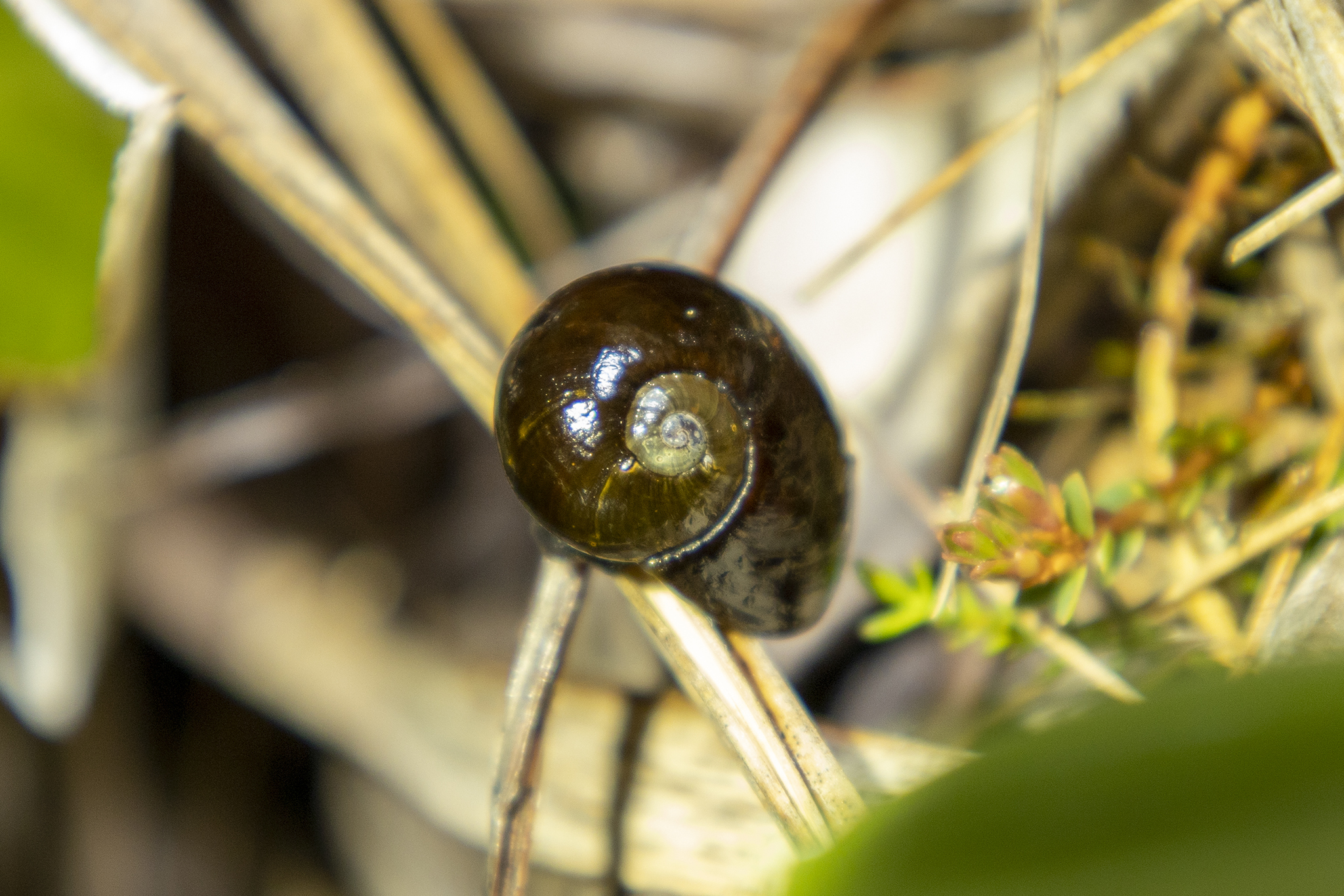
- Rhytida citrina seen in the West Coast Region, New Zealand

Scientific classification
- Kingdom: Animalia
- Phylum: Mollusca
- Class: Gastropoda
- Order: Stylommatophora
- Family: Rhytididae
- Genus: Rhytida
- Species: R. citrina

Binomial name
- Rhytida citrina Hutton, 1883

= Rhytida citrina =

Species of gastropod

Rhytida citrina is a species of medium-sized, air-breathing predatory land snail, a terrestrial pulmonate gastropod mollusc in the eponymous family Rhytididae.

== Taxonomy ==
This species was first described by Frederick Wollaston Hutton in 1883.
