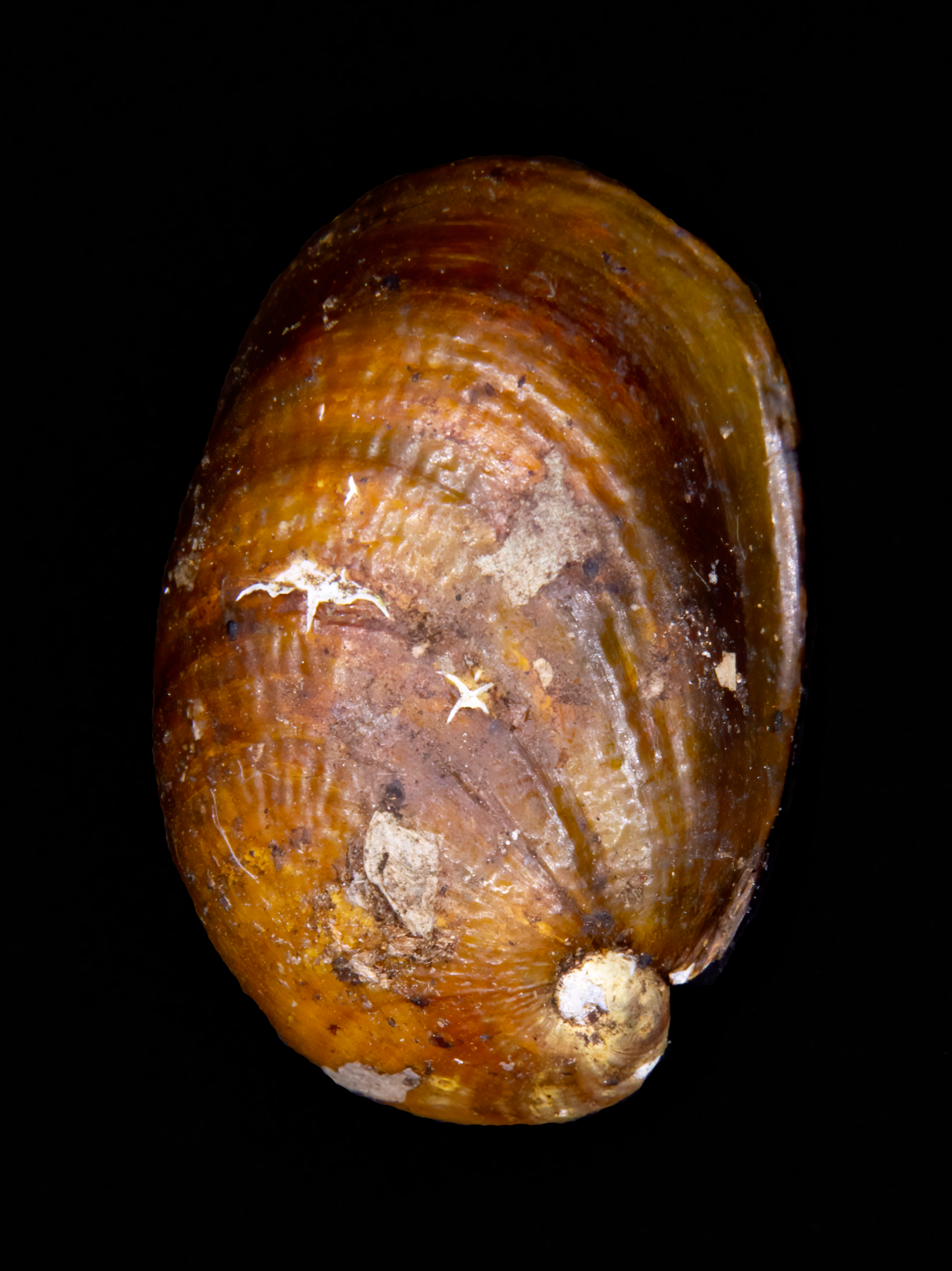
- Found in Kaimai Mamaku Conservation park, Aongatete, New Zealand

Scientific classification
- Domain: Eukaryota
- Kingdom: Animalia
- Phylum: Mollusca
- Class: Gastropoda
- Order: Stylommatophora
- Family: Rhytididae
- Genus: Schizoglossa
- Species: S. worthyae

Binomial name
- Schizoglossa worthyae Powell, 1949

= Schizoglossa worthyae =

Species of gastropod

Schizoglossa worthyae, is a species of large predatory, air-breathing, land slug, a carnivorous terrestrial pulmonate gastropod mollusc in the family Rhytididae.
