= Pondoland cannibal snail =

Conservation status
- Critically Endangered (IUCN 2.3)

Scientific classification
- Kingdom: Animalia
- Phylum: Mollusca
- Class: Gastropoda
- Order: Stylommatophora
- Family: Rhytididae
- Genus: Natalina
- Species: N. beyrichi

Binomial name
- Natalina beyrichi (Von Martens, 1890)

Species of gastropod

The Pondoland cannibal snail, scientific name Natalina beyrichi, is a species of medium-sized predatory air-breathing land snail, a carnivorous terrestrial pulmonate gastropod mollusc in the family Rhytididae.

This species is endemic to South Africa. Its natural habitat is temperate forests. It is threatened by habitat loss.

It is called "cannibal" because it preys on other snails.
