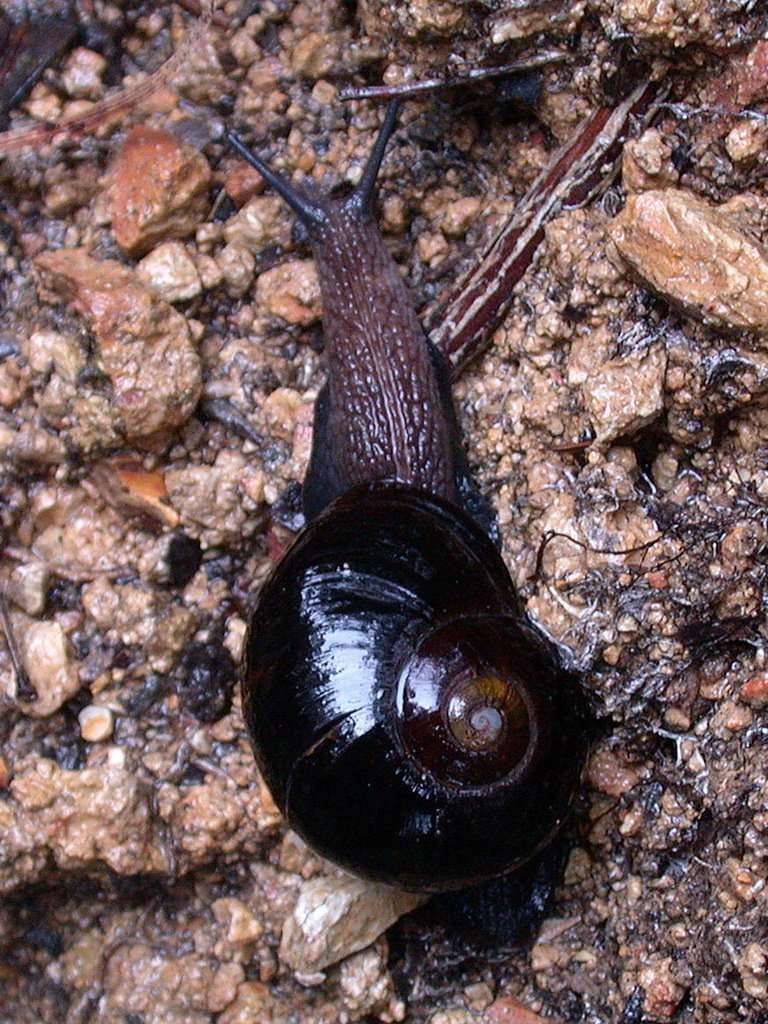

Conservation status
- Endangered (IUCN 2.3)

Scientific classification
- Kingdom: Animalia
- Phylum: Mollusca
- Class: Gastropoda
- Order: Stylommatophora
- Family: Rhytididae
- Genus: Victaphanta
- Species: V. compacta

Binomial name
- Victaphanta compacta (Cox & Hedley, 1912)

Synonyms
- Paryphanta compacta Cox & Hedley, 1912

= Victaphanta compacta =

Species of gastropod

Victaphanta compacta, common name the Otway black snail, is a species of carnivorous air-breathing land snail, a terrestrial pulmonate gastropod mollusks in the family Rhytididae. The Otway Black Snail Victaphanta compacta is only found in cold temperate rainforests in Australia. It is one of four species of the carnivorous land snails in the genus Victaphanta and is endemic to the Otway Ranges.

The Otway Black Snail was first described as Paryphanta compacta (Cox and Hedley 1912). In 1933 the genus Victaphanta was established (Iredale 1933).

== Distribution ==
This species is endemic to Australia and occurs in the Otway Ranges of Victoria.

== Description ==
The body of the snail is grey-blue to black. The shell is spherical with four whorls and varies from a glossy dark brown to black with varying tinges of yellow-brown on the inner whorl. The shell has a maximum diameter of 28 mm and is positioned towards the tail of the body. The shell is thin, light weight and moderately flexible and composed mostly of conchin. The Otway Black Snail can be distinguished from other species of Vicaphanta because of its specific geographic range, globulous shaped shell, lack of an orange frill around its foot and an absence of orange mucus.

The Otway Black Snail is partially nocturnal. It is carnivorous, feasting on other snails, slugs, earthworms and soft bodied insect larvae but is not cannibalistic. It has no jaw as found in herbivorous snails but has long, sharp, backward pointing teeth arranged in v-shaped rows on the radula (underside of the foot of the snail) which hold the prey while it is devoured
