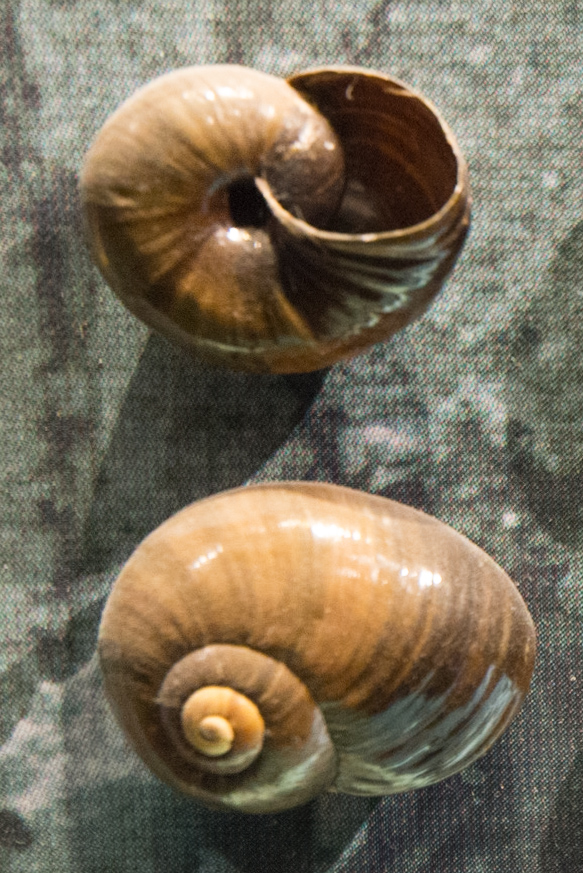
- Powelliphanta spedeni lateumbilicata at Te Papa

Scientific classification
- Kingdom: Animalia
- Phylum: Mollusca
- Class: Gastropoda
- Order: Stylommatophora
- Family: Rhytididae
- Genus: Powelliphanta
- Species: P. spedeni
- Subspecies: P. s. lateumbilicata

Trinomial name
- Powelliphanta spedeni lateumbilicata Powell, 1946

= Powelliphanta spedeni lateumbilicata =

Subspecies of gastropod

Powelliphanta spedeni lateumbilicata, known as one of the amber snails, is a subspecies of large, carnivorous land snail, a terrestrial pulmonate gastropod mollusc in the family Rhytididae.

== Conservation status ==
Powelliphanta spedeni lateumbilicata is classified by the New Zealand Department of Conservation as being Range Restricted.
