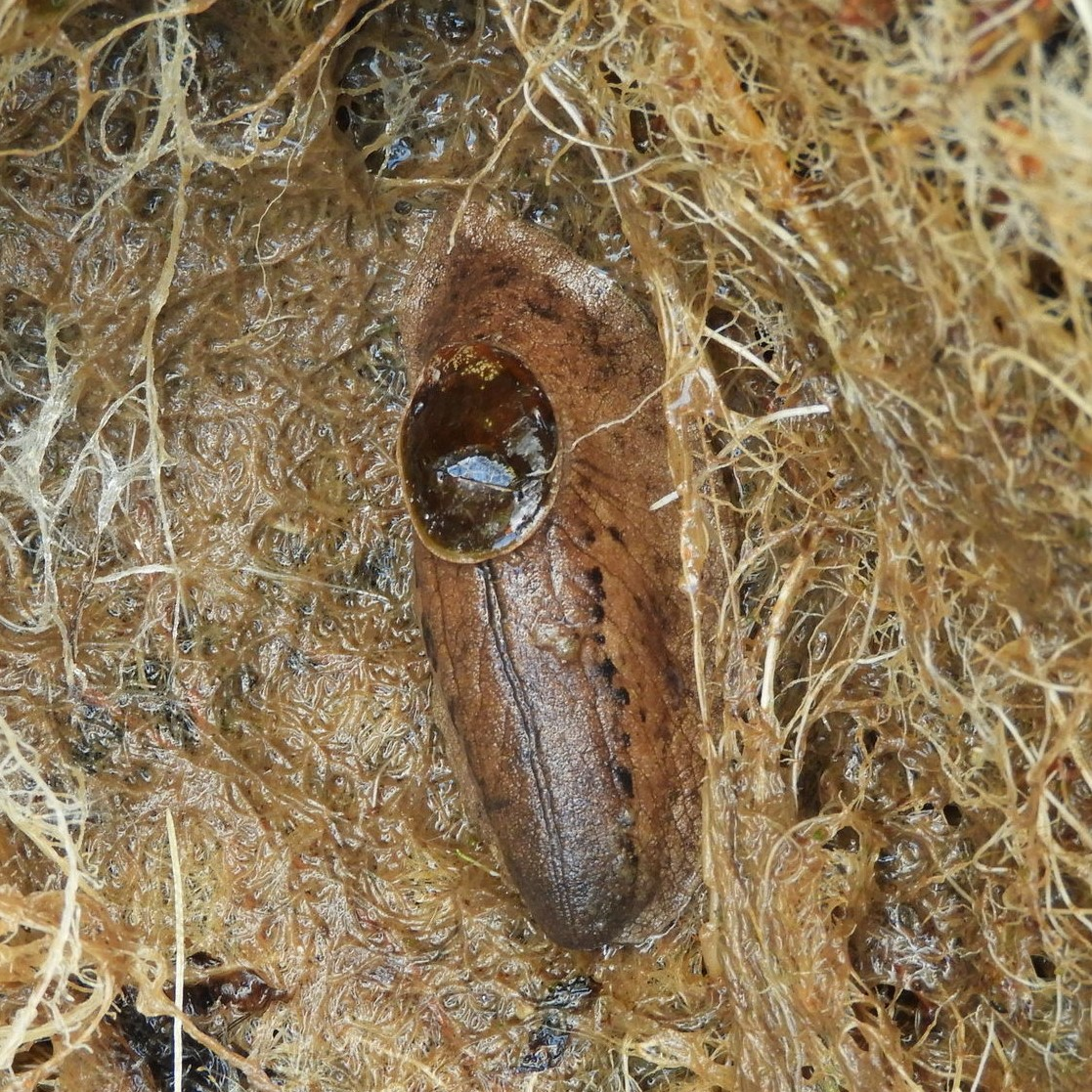

Scientific classification
- Domain: Eukaryota
- Kingdom: Animalia
- Phylum: Mollusca
- Class: Gastropoda
- Order: Stylommatophora
- Family: Rhytididae
- Genus: Schizoglossa
- Species: S. gigantea

Binomial name
- Schizoglossa gigantea Powell, 1930

= Schizoglossa gigantea =

Species of gastropod

Schizoglossa gigantea is a species of large predatory, air-breathing, land slug; a carnivorous terrestrial pulmonate gastropod mollusc in the family Rhytididae. This species is endemic to the North Island of New Zealand.

It was first discovered as 'subfossil with moa bones, cave near Tahora, Gisborne District.' Further subfossil remains have been found in 'caves at Waikaremoana and Mangaone, near Nuhaka, Hawke Bay.' It has also been reported as 'living, WNW side of Mt. Hikurangi, East Cape area, 5753 feet.' In 2012, it was also reported that ' Schizoglossa gigantea has now been found [living?] at four localities (G. Barker, personal communication).'
