= Rhytida otagoensis =

Scientific classification
- Kingdom: Animalia
- Phylum: Mollusca
- Class: Gastropoda
- Order: Stylommatophora
- Family: Rhytididae
- Genus: Rhytida
- Species: R. otagoensis

Binomial name
- Rhytida otagoensis Powell, 1930

Species of gastropod

Rhytida otagoensis is a species of small, air-breathing land snail, a terrestrial pulmonate gastropod mollusc in the family Rhytididae.
