= Schizoglossa major =

Conservation status
- Extinct

Scientific classification
- Kingdom: Animalia
- Phylum: Mollusca
- Class: Gastropoda
- Order: Stylommatophora
- Family: Rhytididae
- Genus: Schizoglossa
- Species: †S. major

Binomial name
- †Schizoglossa major Powell, 1938

Species of gastropod

Schizoglossa major was a species of large predatory, air-breathing, land slug, a carnivorous terrestrial pulmonate gastropod mollusc in the family Rhytididae. This species has only been found as a subfossil.
