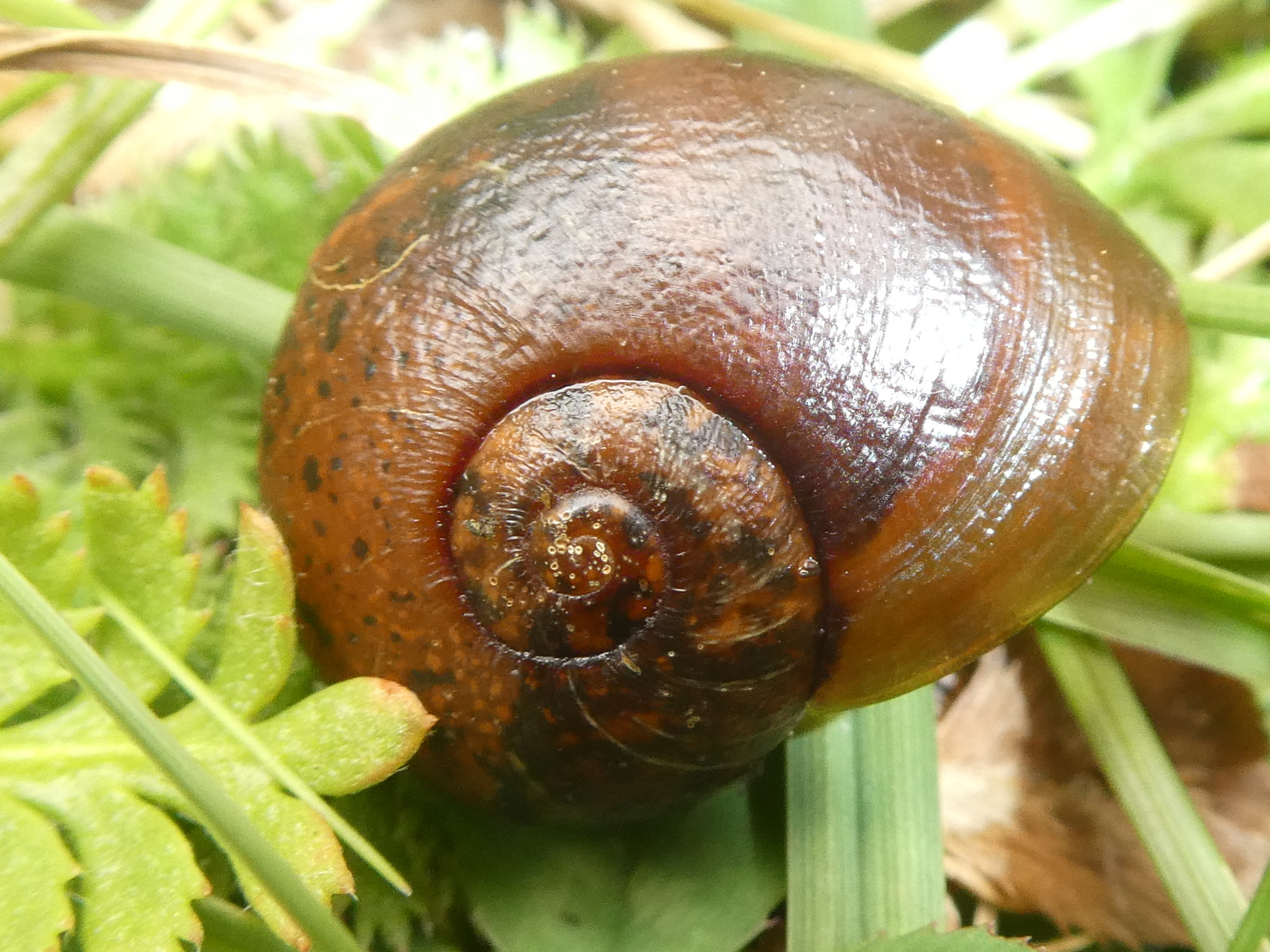

Conservation status
- Critically Endangered (IUCN 2.3)

- Nationally Critical (NZ TCS)

Scientific classification
- Kingdom: Animalia
- Phylum: Mollusca
- Class: Gastropoda
- Order: Stylommatophora
- Family: Rhytididae
- Genus: Rhytida
- Species: R. oconnori

Binomial name
- Rhytida oconnori Powell, 1946

Synonyms
- Rhytida hadfieldi A. W. B. Powell, 1949 (junior subjective synonym)

= Rhytida oconnori =

Species of gastropod

Rhytida oconnori is a species of medium-sized, air-breathing land snail, a terrestrial pulmonate gastropod mollusc in the family Rhytididae. It is found in a few places in the north of the South Island in New Zealand.

== Description ==
Rhytididae are carnivorous. They grow up to 33m in length and 19mm in height. Their eggs are larger than other Rhytididae species.

== Ecology ==
=== Habitat ===
The preferred habitat for Rhytididae in forests is under fern or leaf litter or in damp places under rocks. They also live in sub-alpine zones in tussock or scrub.

=== Distribution ===
Rhytida oconnori is found only at the top of the South Island in the Abel Tasman National Park south east of Tākaka, and at the Punipaua Creek near the Paturau River west of Collingwood in Golden Bay.

=== Predators ===
The song thrush (Turdus philomelos), an introduced species to New Zealand, is a predator of Rhytididae.
