= Rhytida patula =

Scientific classification
- Kingdom: Animalia
- Phylum: Mollusca
- Class: Gastropoda
- Order: Stylommatophora
- Family: Rhytididae
- Genus: Rhytida
- Species: R. patula

Binomial name
- Rhytida patula Hutton, 1883

Species of gastropod

Rhytida patula is a species of medium-sized, air-breathing land snail, a terrestrial pulmonate gastropod mollusc in the family Rhytididae.

== Distribution ==
This species occurs in New Zealand

== Life cycle ==
Dimensions of eggs of Rhytida patula are 2.75 × 2.5, 3 × 2.25, 2.5 × 2, 3 × 2.5, 3 × 2.25, 3 × 2.25 mm.
