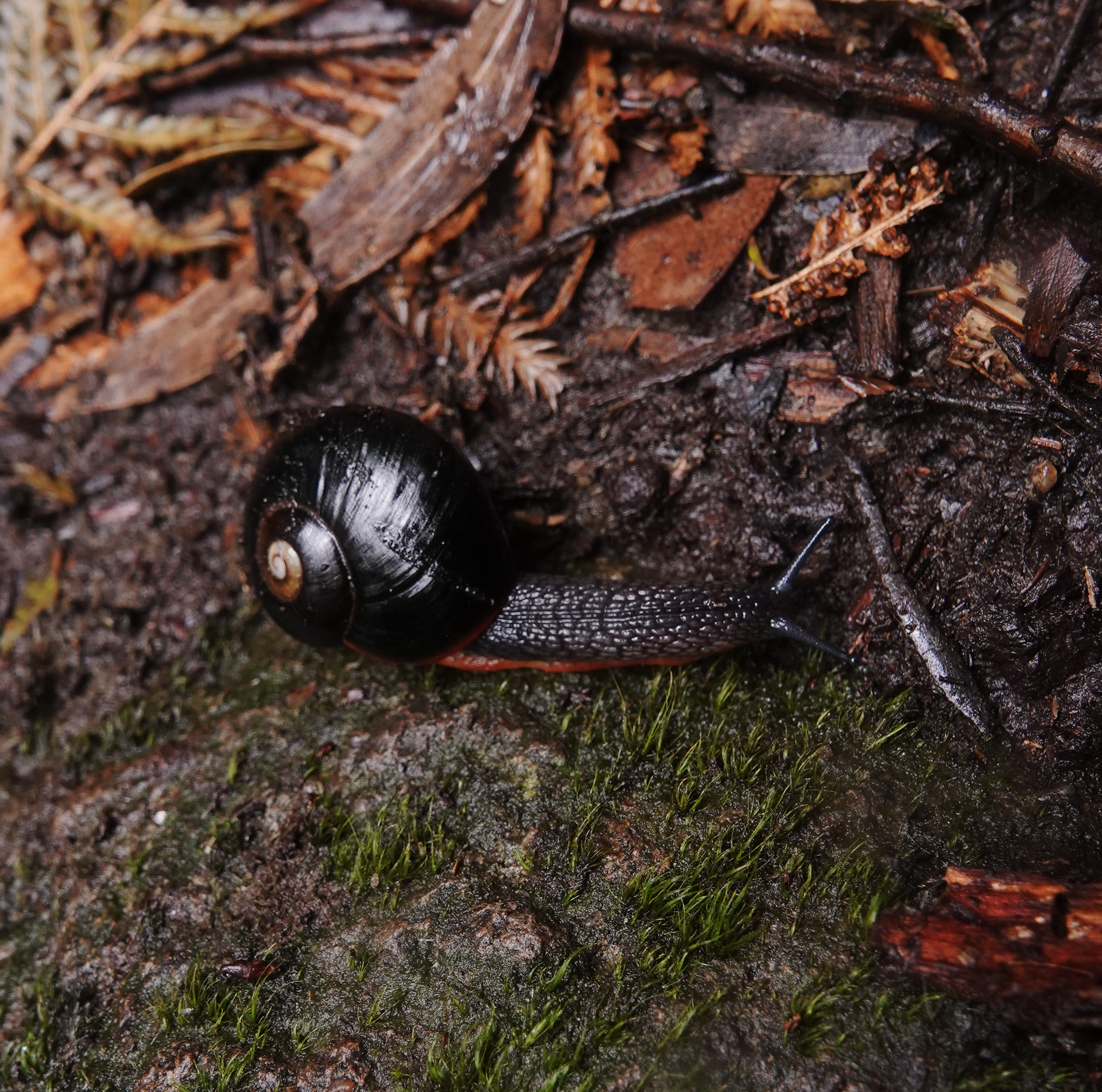

Conservation status
- Near Threatened (IUCN 2.3)

Scientific classification
- Kingdom: Animalia
- Phylum: Mollusca
- Class: Gastropoda
- Order: Stylommatophora
- Family: Rhytididae
- Genus: Victaphanta
- Species: V. atramentaria

Binomial name
- Victaphanta atramentaria (Shuttleworth, 1852)

Synonyms
- Nanina atramentaria Shuttleworth, 1852

= Victaphanta atramentaria =

Species of gastropod

Victaphanta atramentaria, common name the Gippsland black snail, is a species of carnivorous air-breathing land snail, a terrestrial pulmonate gastropod mollusk in the family Rhytididae.

== Distribution ==
This species is endemic to Australia and occurs in Victoria.
