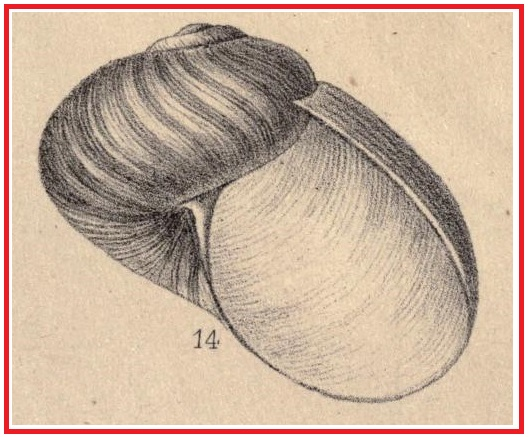

Conservation status
- Vulnerable (IUCN 2.3)

Scientific classification
- Kingdom: Animalia
- Phylum: Mollusca
- Class: Gastropoda
- Order: Stylommatophora
- Family: Rhytididae
- Genus: Natalina
- Species: N. wesseliana

Binomial name
- Natalina wesseliana Kobelt, 1876

= Tongaland cannibal snail =

Species of gastropod

The Tongaland cannibal snail, scientific name Natalina wesseliana, is a species of medium-sized predatory air-breathing land snail, carnivorous terrestrial pulmonate gastropod mollusc in the family Rhytididae.

This species is endemic to South Africa and is named after the natural region of Tongaland. Its natural habitat is temperate forests. It is threatened by habitat loss.
