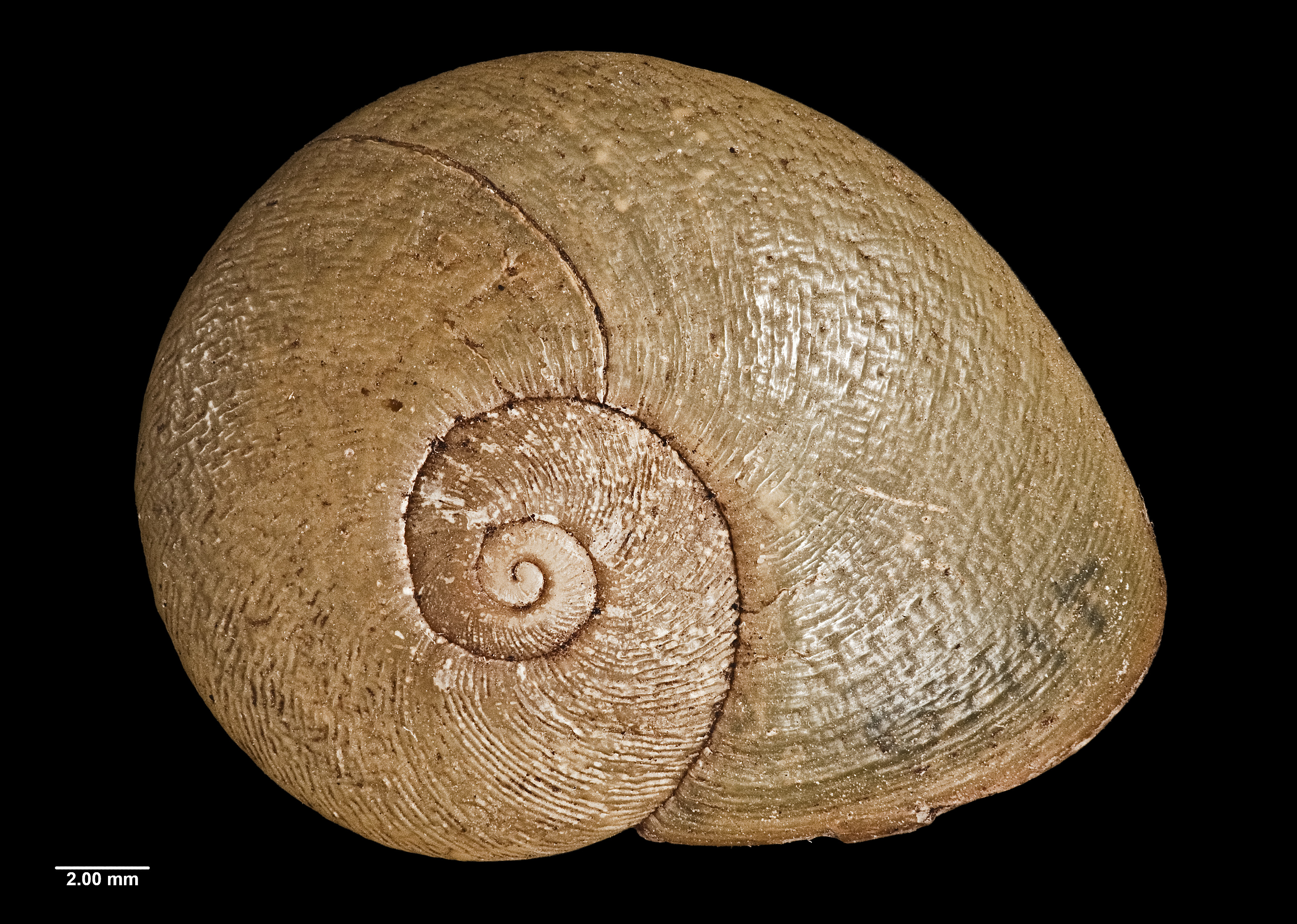
- Holotype

Conservation status
- Naturally Uncommon (NZ TCS)

Scientific classification
- Kingdom: Animalia
- Phylum: Mollusca
- Class: Gastropoda
- Order: Stylommatophora
- Family: Rhytididae
- Subfamily: Rhytidinae
- Genus: Rhytidarex
- Species: R. johnsoni

Binomial name
- Rhytidarex johnsoni (A. W. B. Powell, 1948)

Synonyms
- Rhytida johnsoni A. W. B. Powell, 1948; Rhytida (Rhytidarex) johnsoni A. W. B. Powell, 1948

= Rhytidarex johnsoni =

Species of land snail

Rhytidarex johnsoni is a species of land snail belonging to the family Rhytididae. It is endemic to Manawatāwhi / Three Kings Islands, northwest of mainland New Zealand.

== Description ==
In the original description, Powell described the species as below:

Shell of moderate size for the genus, thin and depressed, with rapidly increasing whorls. Whorls 3½, including a slightly convex proto conch of 1½ weakly radially wrinkled whorls. Post-nuclear whorls commencing with fairly regular, closely spaced radial wrinkle-striae, but becoming irregularly anastomosing and finally malleate over the latter half of the body-whorl. This sculptural pattern is fine but distinct on the dorsal surface, but obsolescent on the base from just below the periphery. The periphery is narrowly rounded, scarcely carinated. Umbilicus deep, graduate, about one-eighth major diameter of base. Spire about one-third height of shell. Colour of epidermis uniformly pale yellowish olive.

Animal narrow, dorsal surface dark smoky grey, with a narrow, light-brown median stripe, clouded with dark grey towards the head. Neck and sides with rather large ovate flattened granules. Edge of foot and sole fawn to pale smoky grey. Tentacles dark grey, finely granulate.
Radula: 33 + 1 + 33

Egg: 5.75 mm (0.226 in) x 4.5 mm (0.18 in). This is larger than for any of the mainland species so far recorded.

The shells of the species have a diameter of 22 mm (0.87 in) (maximum of 27 mm (1.1 in)), and a height of 11 mm (0.43 in). The species resembles Rhytida greenwoodi, but can be identified due to having a narrowly rounded body whorl that is almost carinated at the shell periphery.

== Taxonomy ==
The species was first described by A. W. B. Powell in 1948 as Rhytida (Rhytidarex) johnsoni, who named it the type species of the subgenus Rhytida (Rhytidarex). When Rhytidarex was raised to genus status by Frank Climo in 1977, it remained the type species for the taxon. Powell named the species after Major Magnus Earle Johnson, one of the two collectors of the holotype, in recognition of his exploration of Manawatāwhi / Three Kings Islands. The holotype of the species is held by the Auckland War Memorial Museum. Individuals on different islands have very little genetic diversity.

== Distribution and habitat ==
R. johnsoni is endemic to Manawatāwhi / Three Kings Islands, known to occur on Oromaki / North East Island, Moekawa / South West Island and Ōhau / West Island. It is one of the widest distributed endemic land molluscs of Manawatāwhi / Three Kings Islands. The species has been found in leaf litter associated with Meryta sinclairii.

== Conservation status ==
Under the New Zealand Threat Classification System, this species is listed as "Naturally Uncommon".

== Gallery ==
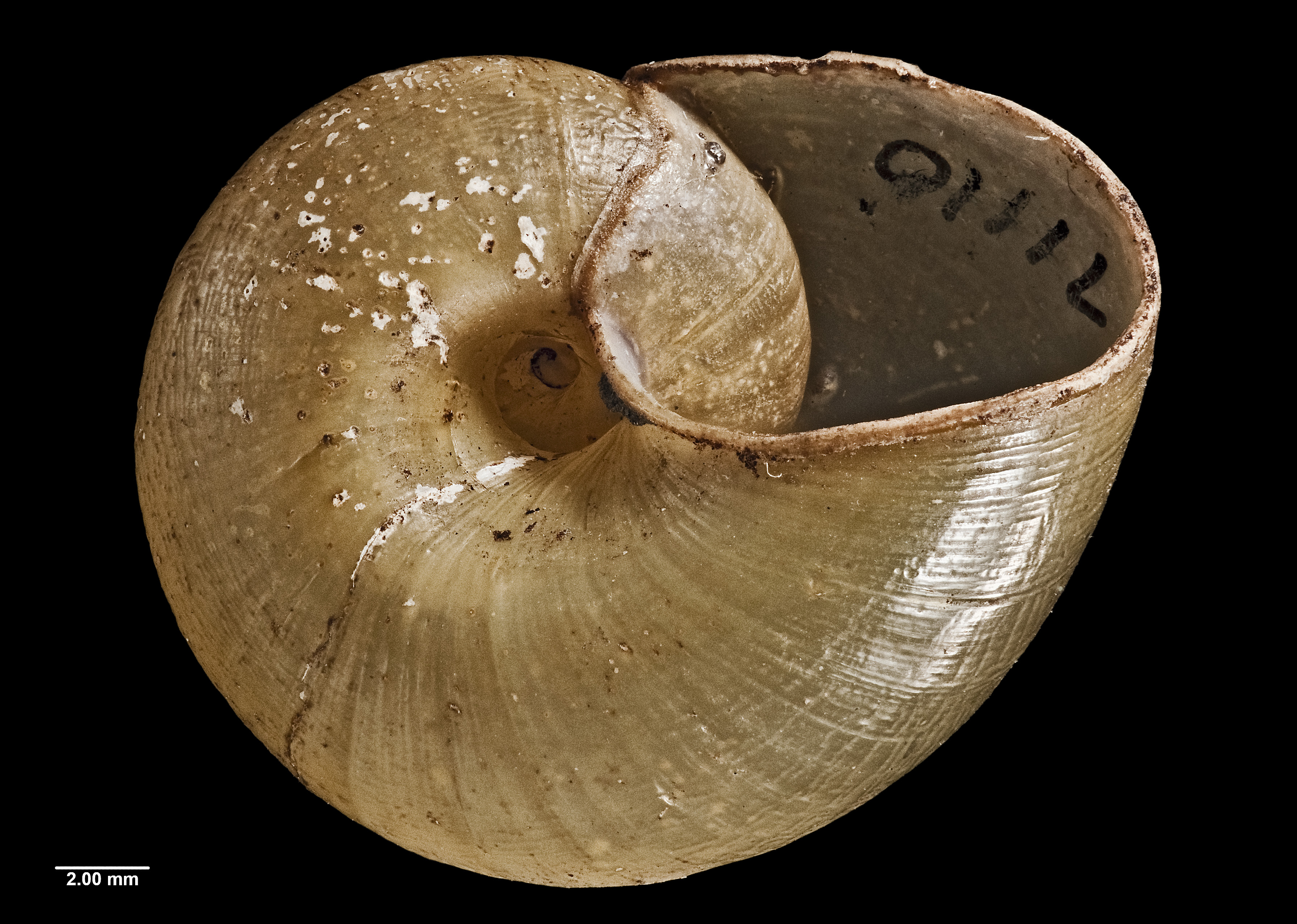
Underside view of holotype

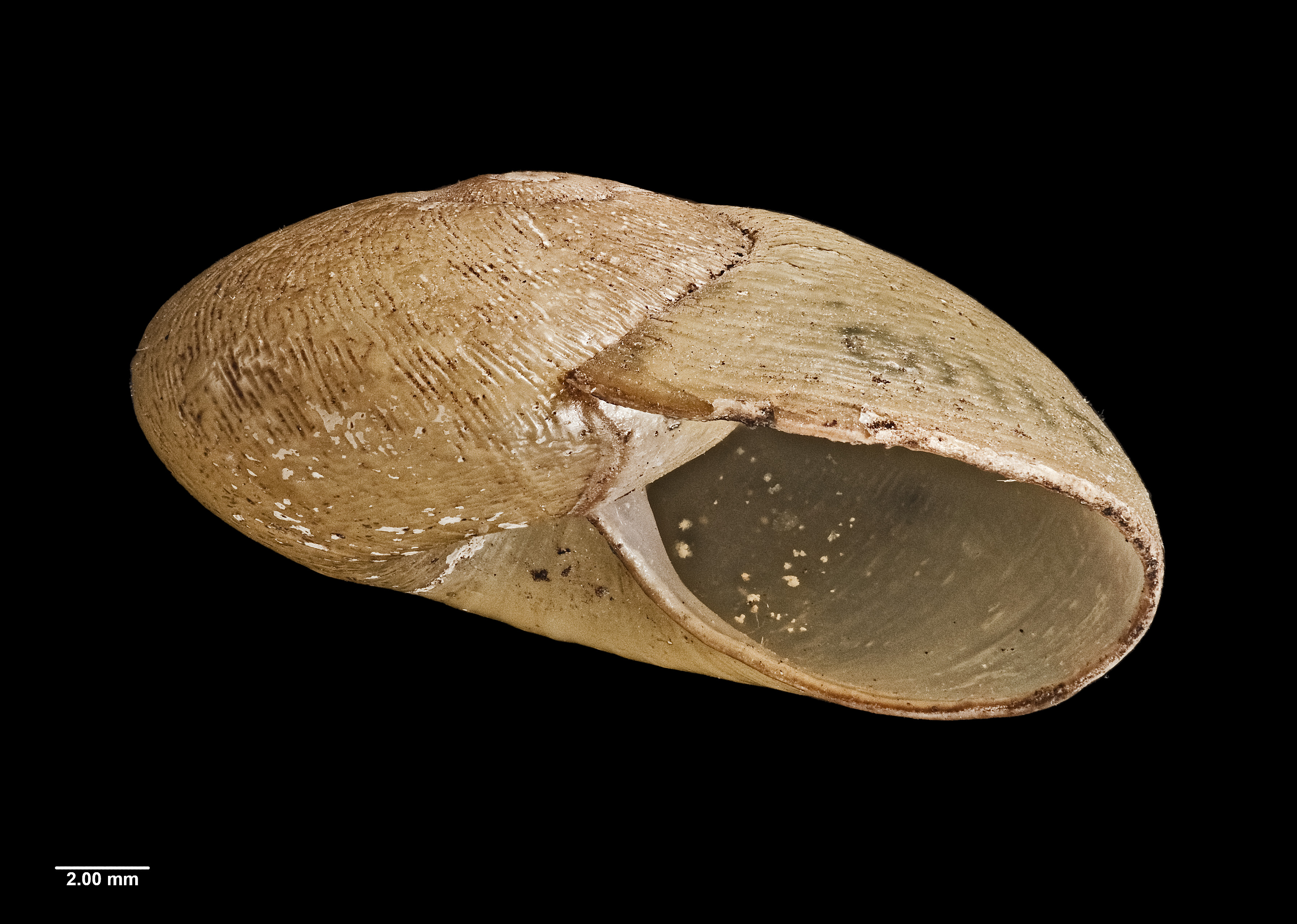
Side view of holotype
