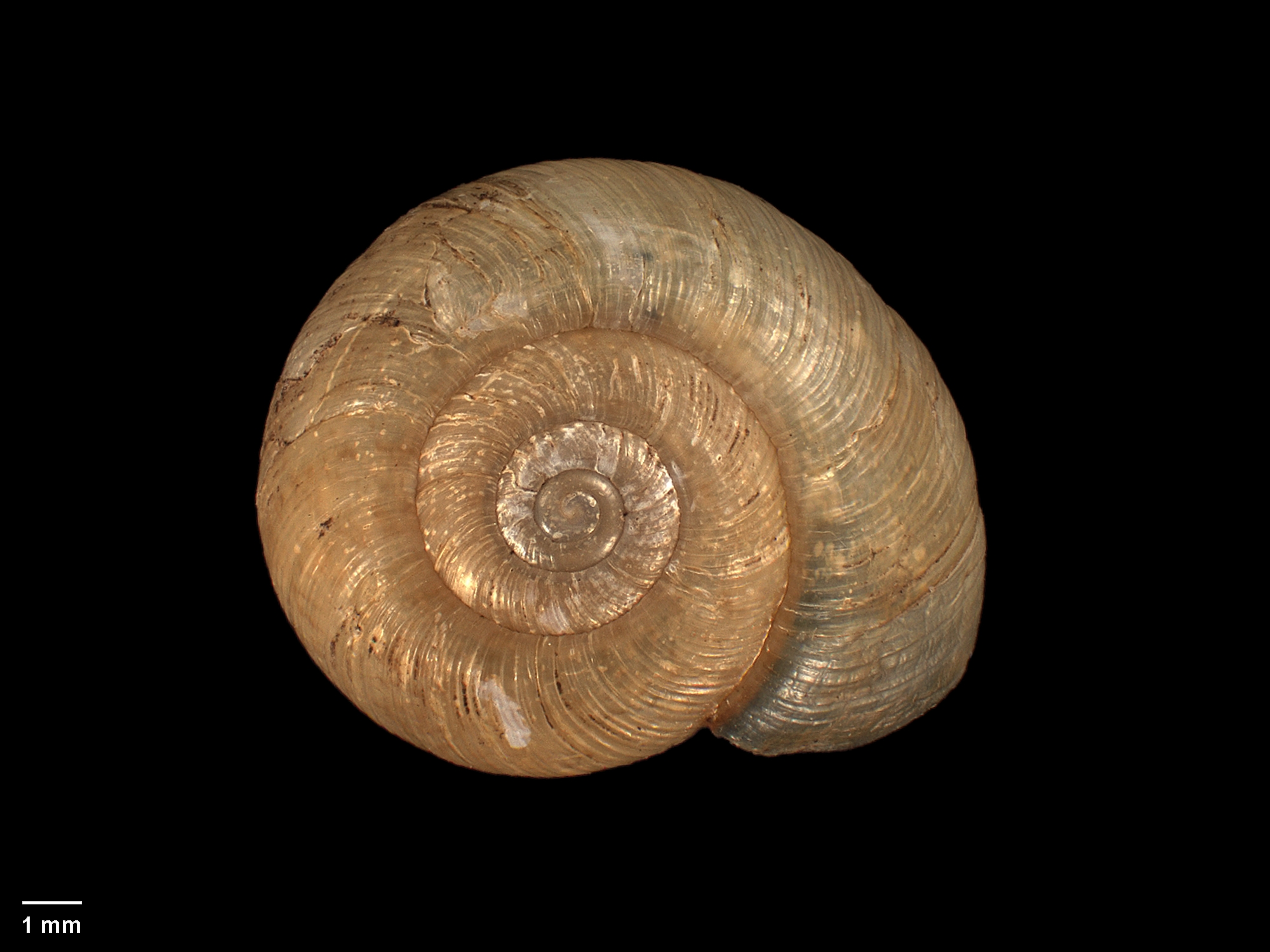
- Delouagapia tasmani

Scientific classification
- Kingdom: Animalia
- Phylum: Mollusca
- Class: Gastropoda
- Order: Stylommatophora
- Superfamily: Rhytidoidea
- Family: Rhytididae
- Subfamily: Rhytidinae
- Genus: Delouagapia; Powell, 1952

Type species
- Delouagapia cordelia

= Delouagapia =

Genus of land snails

Delouagapia is a genus of land snails belonging to the family Rhytididae. Both members of the genus are endemic to New Zealand, with D. cordelia found in forested areas of Northland, and D. tasmani in Manawatāwhi / Three Kings Islands.

== Description ==
In the original description, Powell described the genus as below:

The dental formula for both the New Zealand Delos coresia and jeffreysiana is 9+0+9 and that of cordelia 12+0+12. The teeth in all three are stout, relatively broad-based and slightly hooked. In Delos typical, the second tooth from the centre is largest, after which they regularly diminish. In Delouagapia the fourth tooth from the centre is disproportionately large, then regularly diminishing from the fifth to the twelfth. The animal of cordelia is slate-grey except for the sole, which is white. Surface reticulate veined, scarcely warty. Two deep parallel grooves on the dorsal area run back from between the superior tentacles, which are blunt, cylindrical and moderately long. Inferior tentacles short, genital orifice on right below mantle collar, proboscis capable of protrusion, foot narrow, transversely wrinkled and with a moderately long pointed tail.

The genus can be differentiated from Delos due to having more radular teeth per row, and by the members' distinctive colour patterns. Climo noted that the genus differed from Delos due to being more tightly coiled, by having a greenish background colouration to the shells of the animals, and the presence of brown blotches or zig-zags on the shells.

== Taxonomy ==
The genus was first described by A. W. B. Powell in 1952, as a subgenus of Delos, and naming Gerontia cordelia (now known as Delouagapia cordelia) as the type species. In 1959, Alan Solem synonymised the taxon with Delos; and in 1977, Frank Climo restored Delouagapia, raising it to genus level. The genus was monotypic until 1999, when D. tasmani was described.

== Distribution and habitat ==
The genus is endemic to New Zealand. D. cordelia is known to occur in Northland, and while it was first recorded as occurring in Titirangi in Auckland, no observations have been made since. D. cordelia is arboreal, found in association with Astelia epiphytes growing on Vitex lucens. D. tasmani is endemic to Oromaki / North East Island in Manawatāwhi / Three Kings Islands, found in Meryta sinclairii-dominated forest in leaf litter under stones.

== Species ==
Species within the genus Delouagapia include:

- Delouagapia cordelia (F. W. Hutton, 1883)
- Delouagapia tasmani Goulstone & Brook, 1999
