= Tasmaphena lamproides =

Keeled snail

Conservation status
- Near Threatened (IUCN 3.1)

Scientific classification
- Kingdom: Animalia
- Phylum: Mollusca
- Class: Gastropoda
- Order: Stylommatophora
- Family: Rhytididae
- Genus: Tasmaphena
- Species: T. lamproides

Binomial name
- Tasmaphena lamproides (Cox, 1868)

Species of gastropod

Tasmaphena lamproides is a species of land snail in the family Rhytididae. It occurs in north-western Tasmania and probably far southern Victoria. It is known by the common name keeled snail.

There are many small subpopulations, and the total population in Tasmania is probably a few hundred thousand snails. The snail generally lives in wet forest habitat. Some subpopulations are threatened by logging and clearing of forests for development and agriculture.
