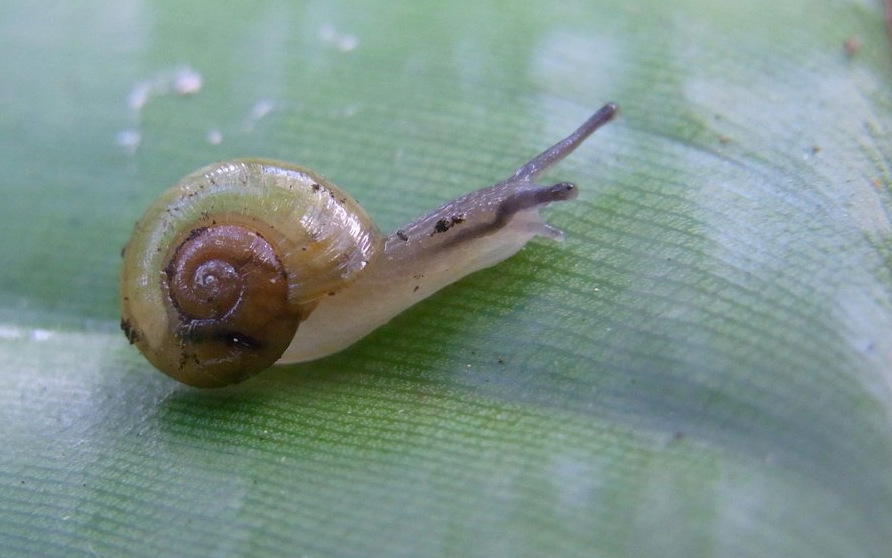
- A live individual of what is thought to be Vitellidelos dulcis

Scientific classification
- Kingdom: Animalia
- Phylum: Mollusca
- Class: Gastropoda
- Order: Stylommatophora
- Family: Rhytididae
- Genus: Vitellidelos
- Species: V. dulcis

Binomial name
- Vitellidelos dulcis Iredale 1943

= Vitellidelos dulcis =

Species of gastropod

Vitellidelos dulcis is a species of small, air-breathing, carnivorous land snail, a terrestrial pulmonate gastropod mollusc in the family Rhytididae. This species is found in Australia.
