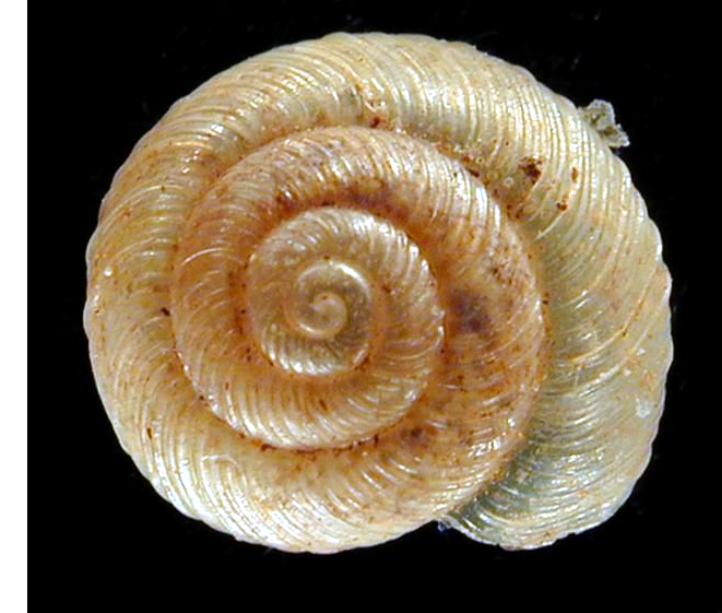
- Shell (specimen at the Australian Museum)

Conservation status
- Data Deficient (IUCN 2.3)

Scientific classification
- Kingdom: Animalia
- Phylum: Mollusca
- Class: Gastropoda
- Order: Stylommatophora
- Family: Rhytididae
- Genus: Torresiropa
- Species: T. spaldingi

Binomial name
- Torresiropa spaldingi (Brazier, 1876)

Synonyms
- Helix (Patula) spaldingi Brazier, 1876; Helix (Patula) spaldingi var. carinata Brazier, 1880; Ouagabia (Torresiropa) spaldingi (Brazier, 1876); Torresiropa mella Iredale, 1933

= Torresiropa spaldingi =

Species of gastropod

Torresiropa spaldingi is a species of air-breathing land snail, a terrestrial pulmonate gastropod mollusk in the family Rhytididae.

== Description ==
The diameter of the shell is 5.5 mm.

(Original description) The shell is rather broadly and perspectively umbilicated, depressly orbicular, thin, and translucent, lacking shine and appearing rather white. Its surface exhibits irregularly oblique, roughly striated lines with smooth interstices. The spire is moderately flattened, culminating in an obtuse apex, and the suture appears deep. The shell comprises three and a half scarcely convex whorls. The body whorl is rather large and inflated, displaying an angle above and a rounded periphery, with a roundly convex base. The umbilicus measures half the width of the shell and presents somewhat deep and rounded margins. The aperture lies nearly vertical and sub-circular. The peristome is thin and acute, with approximating margins, the right margin being straight and the columellar margin slightly reflected.

== Distribution ==
This species is endemic to Australia and occurs on Cape York Peninsula and Torres Strait Islands.
