= Tasmaphena =

Scientific classification
- Kingdom: Animalia
- Phylum: Mollusca
- Class: Gastropoda
- Order: Stylommatophora
- Family: Rhytididae
- Genus: Tasmaphena; Iredale, 1933

Genus of gastropods

Tasmaphena is a genus of medium-sized, predatory, air-breathing land snails, carnivorous terrestrial pulmonate gastropod mollusks in the family Rhytididae.

== Species ==
Species within the genus Tasmaphena include:

- Tasmaphena sinclairi (Pfeiffer, 1846)
- Tasmaphena lamproides (Cox, 1868)
- Tasmaphena ruga (Legrand, 1871)
