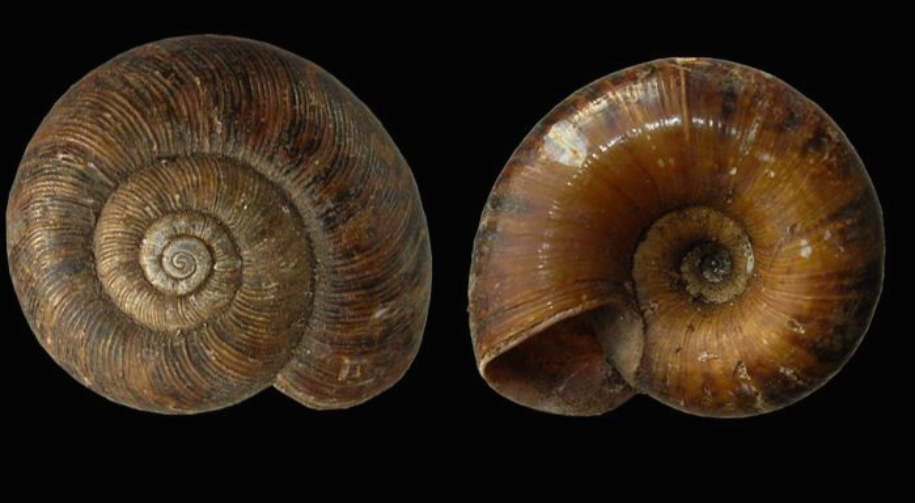
- Shell of Ouagapia villandrei (specimen at MNHN, Paris)

Scientific classification
- Kingdom: Animalia
- Phylum: Mollusca
- Class: Gastropoda
- Order: Stylommatophora
- Family: Rhytididae
- Subfamily: Rhytidinae
- Genus: Ouagapia; Crosse, 1895

Synonyms
- Ouagabia [sic] · unaccepted (incorrect subsequent spelling); Ouagabia (Ouagabia) [sic] · unaccepted; Rhytida (Ouagapia) Crosse, 1895 (superseded combination); Rhytida (Ougapia) (incorrect subsequent spelling of Ouagapia)

= Ouagapia =

Genus of land snails

Ouagapia is a genus of air-breathing land snails, terrestrial pulmonate gastropod molluscs in the family Rhytididae.

== Description ==
(Original description in French) The discoidal shell is broadly umbilicated, revealing the whorls of the spire. It feels thin and somewhat dull on the spire side, where it is marked with faint spiral striae. On the umbilical side, it appears almost smooth, glossy, and olive-green with irregularly arranged brown spots that merge on the spire side to form longitudinal bands. The spire lies almost completely flat. The suture is strongly marked, sunken, and channeled. The aperture presents a subhorizontal and elongated semi-lunar shape. The peristome is simple, thin, and sharp along all its edges.

== Species ==
- Ouagapia gradata (A. Gould, 1846)
- Ouagapia oldroydae (Vanatta, 1930)
- Ouagapia perryi (E. A. Smith, 1897)
- Ouagapia ratusukuni C. M. Cooke, 1942
- Ouagapia raynali (Gassies, 1863)
- Ouagapia santoensis Solem, 1959
- Ouagapia villandrei (Gassies, 1865)
