= Occirhenea =

Scientific classification
- Kingdom: Animalia
- Phylum: Mollusca
- Class: Gastropoda
- Order: Stylommatophora
- Family: Rhytididae
- Genus: Occirhenea; Iredale, 1933

Genus of gastropods

Occirhenea is a genus of medium-sized predatory air-breathing land snails, carnivorous terrestrial pulmonate gastropod molluscs in the family Rhytididae.

== Species ==
Species within the genus Occirhenea include:

- Occirhenea georgiana
