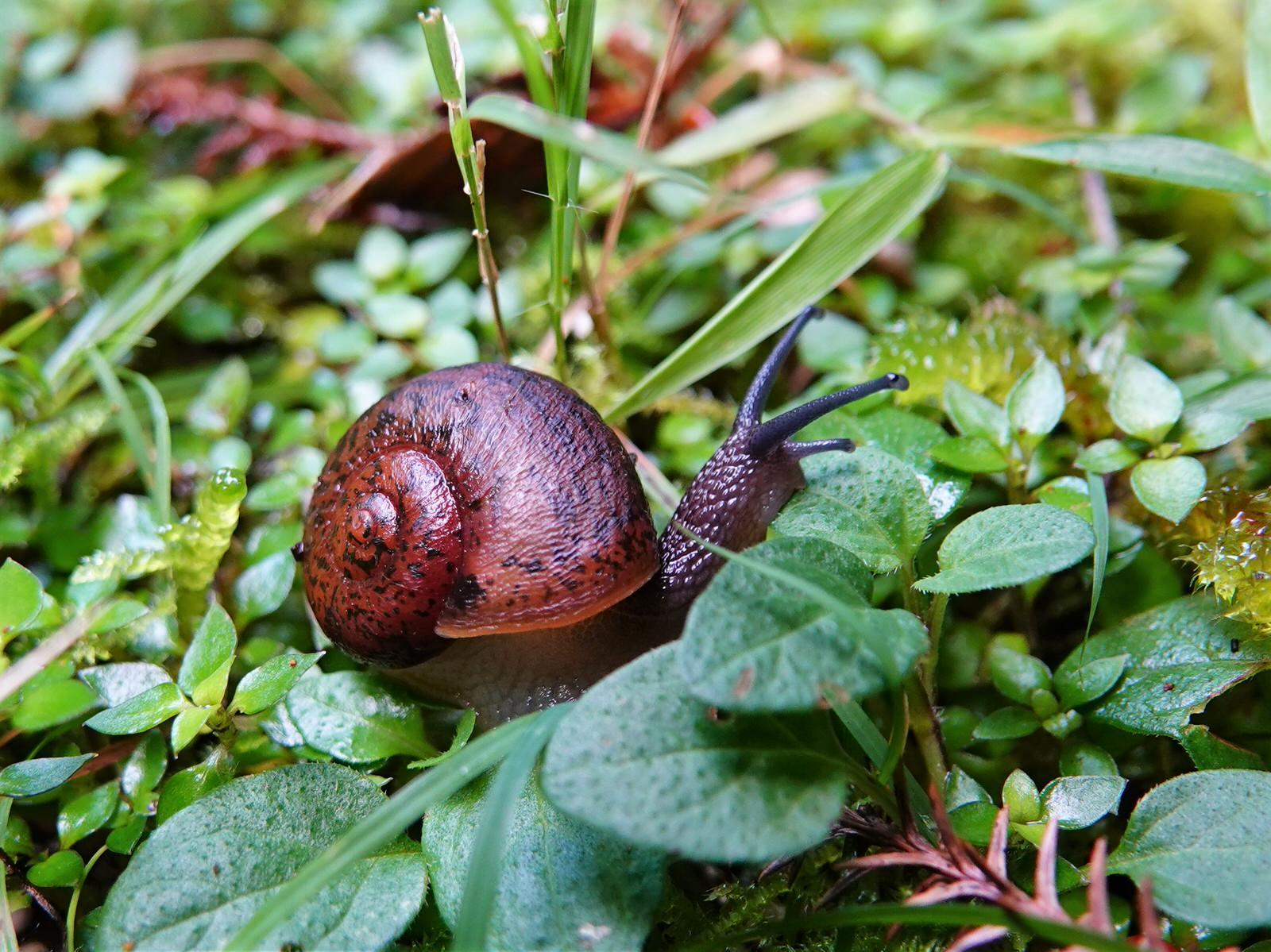
- Rhytida greenwoodi greenwoodi

Scientific classification
- Kingdom: Animalia
- Phylum: Mollusca
- Class: Gastropoda
- Order: Stylommatophora
- Family: Rhytididae
- Genus: Rhytida
- Species: R. greenwoodi

Binomial name
- Rhytida greenwoodi (Gray, 1850)

= Rhytida greenwoodi =

Species of gastropod

Rhytida greenwoodi is a species of medium-sized, air-breathing predatory land snail, a terrestrial pulmonate gastropod mollusc in the family Rhytididae.

== Subspecies ==
- Rhytida greenwoodi greenwoodi (Gray, 1950) North Island
- Rhytida greenwoodi stephenensis Powell, 1930 Stephens Island, Cook Strait
- Rhytida greenwoodi webbi Powell, 1949 South Island

== Distribution ==
This species occurs in New Zealand.

== Ecology ==
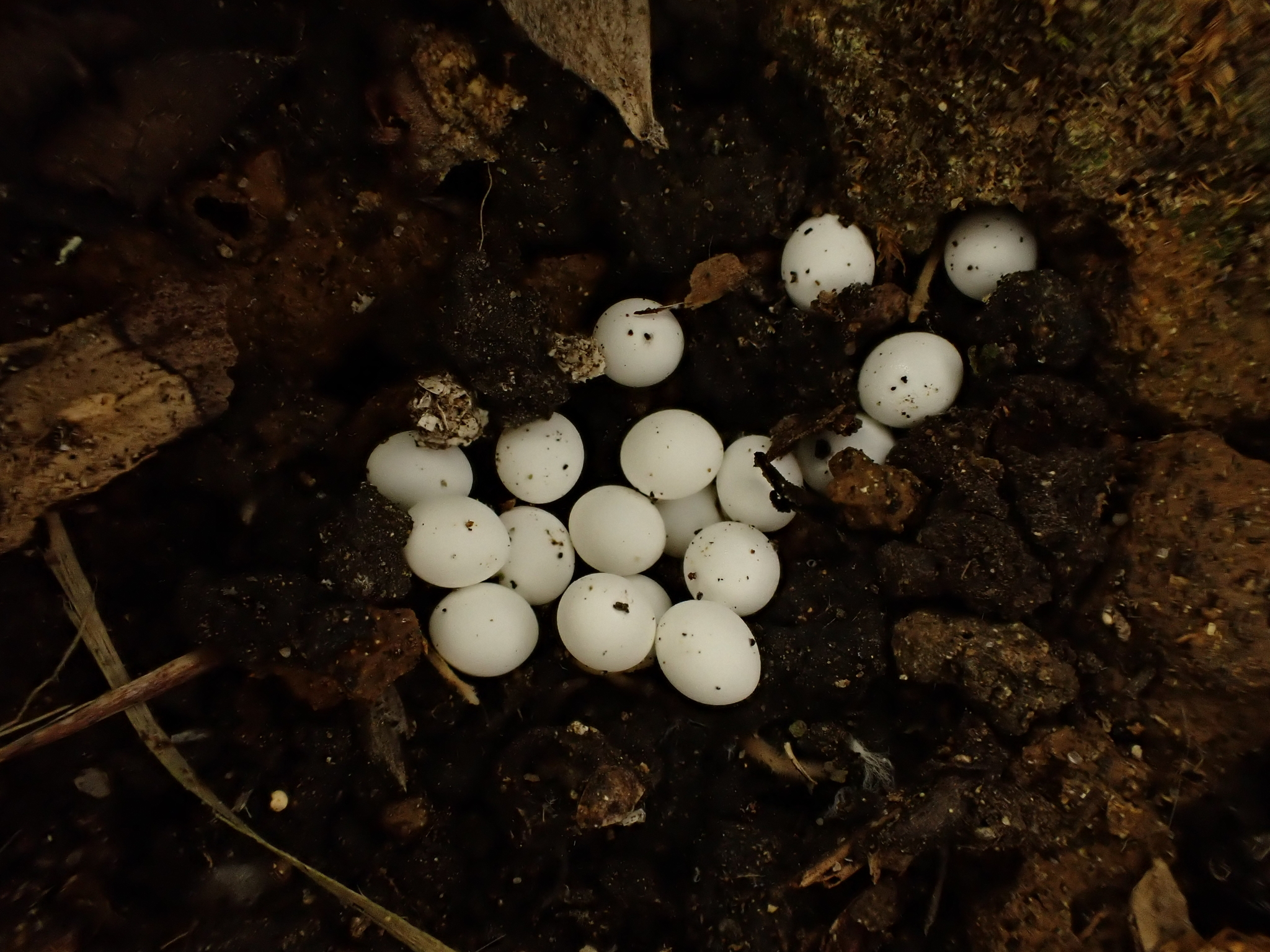
A pile of Rhytida greenwoodi greenwoodi eggs

The number and size of eggs laid, dimensions of eggs of Rhytida greenwoodi are 3.25 × 2.73, 3 × 2.8, 2.75 × 2.5, 3.5 × 2.75, 5 × 4, 4 × 3, 3.75 × 3, 4.75 × 4, 4.75 × 3.75, 4.75 × 3.5 mm.
