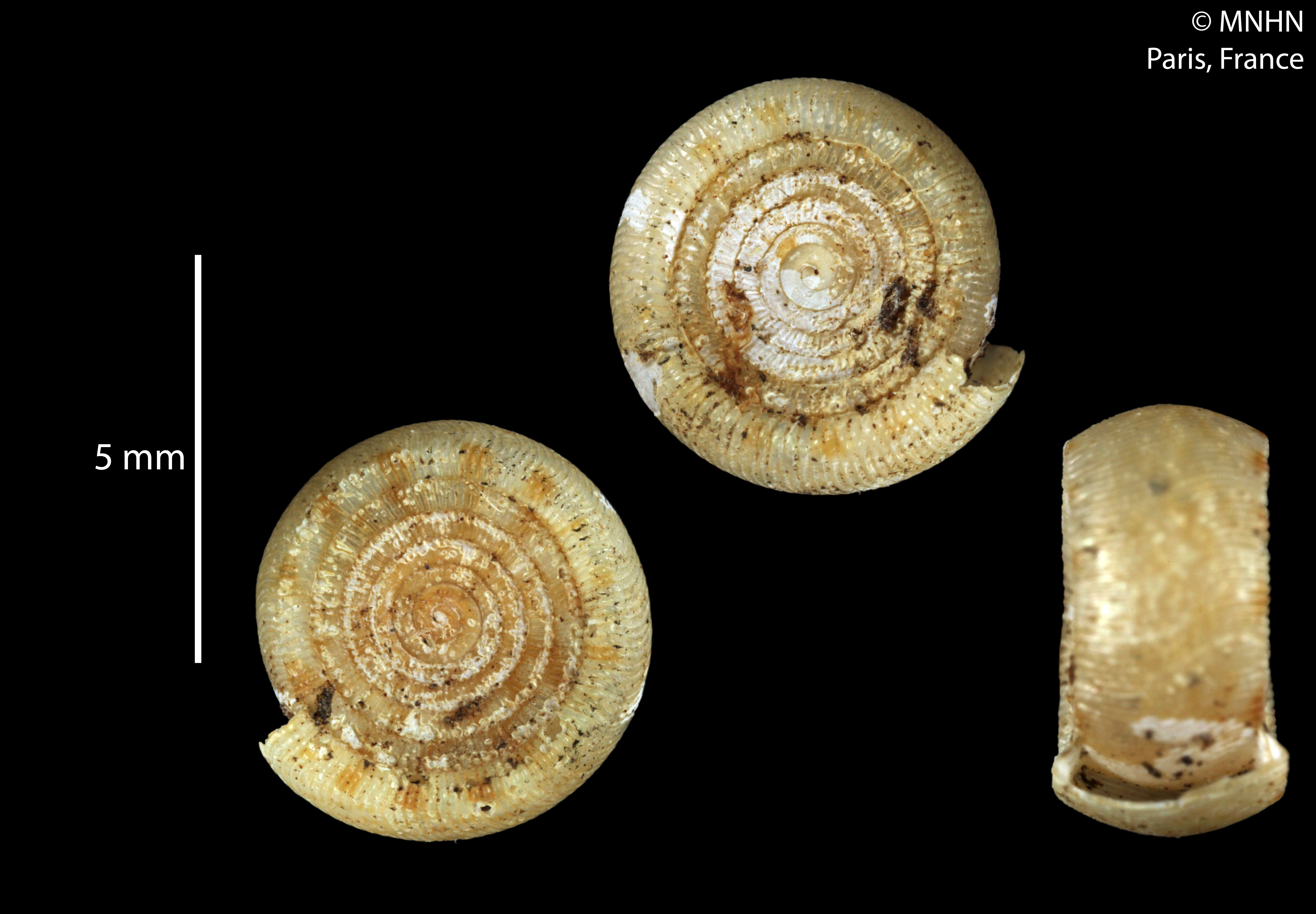
- Shell of Diplomphalus vaysseti (specimen at MNHN, Paris)

Scientific classification
- Kingdom: Animalia
- Phylum: Mollusca
- Class: Gastropoda
- Order: Stylommatophora
- Superfamily: Rhytidoidea
- Family: Rhytididae
- Subfamily: Rhytidinae
- Genus: Diplomphalus; Crosse & P. Fischer, 1872

Type species
- Helix cabriti Gassies, 1863

= Diplomphalus =

Genus of gastropods

Diplomphalus is a genus of land snails with an operculum, terrestrial gastropod mollusks in the family Rhytididae.

== Species ==
- Diplomphalus cabriti (Gassies, 1863)
- Diplomphalus mariei (Crosse, 1867)
- Diplomphalus montrouzieri (Souverbie, 1858)
- Diplomphalus solidulus Tryon, 1885
- Diplomphalus vaysseti (Marie, 1871)

Species brought into synonymy

- Diplomphalus fabrei Crosse, 1875 : synonym of Pseudomphalus megei (Lambert, 1873)
- Diplomphalus fischeri Franc, 1953 : synonym of Diplomphalus mariei (Crosse, 1867)
- Diplomphalus huttoni Suter, 1890 : synonym of Cavellioropa huttoni (Suter, 1890)
- Diplomphalus moussoni Suter, 1890 : synonym of Cavellioropa moussoni (Suter, 1890) (original combination)
- Diplomphalus solidula Tryon, 1885 : synonym of Diplomphalus solidulus Tryon, 1885 (incorrect gender agreement of specific
