= Protorugosa =

Scientific classification
- Domain: Eukaryota
- Kingdom: Animalia
- Phylum: Mollusca
- Class: Gastropoda
- Order: Stylommatophora
- Superfamily: Rhytidoidea
- Family: Rhytididae
- Subfamily: Rhytidinae
- Genus: Protorugosa; Shea & Griffiths, 2010

Type species
- Protorugosa burraga Shea & O. L. Griffiths, 2010

Genus of gastropods

Protorugosa is a genus of large, air-breathing land snails, pulmonate gastropods in the family Rhytididae, first described by Michael Shea & Owen Griffiths in 2010. This snail is endemic to New South Wales.

== Species ==
- Protorugosa alpica (Iredale, 1943)
- Protorugosa burraga Shea & O. L. Griffiths, 2010
