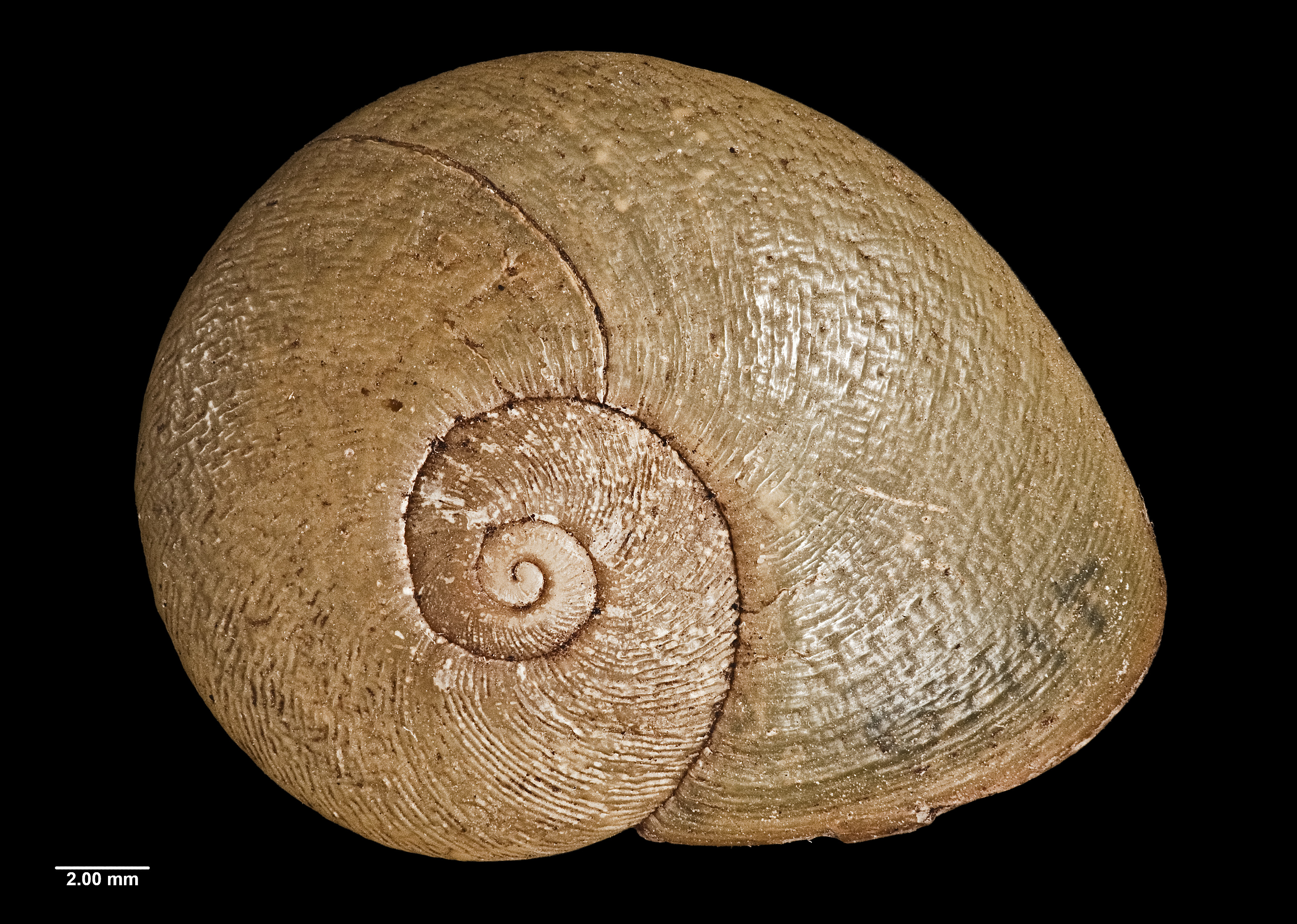
- Holotype of R. johnsoni

Scientific classification
- Kingdom: Animalia
- Phylum: Mollusca
- Class: Gastropoda
- Order: Stylommatophora
- Superfamily: Rhytidoidea
- Family: Rhytididae
- Subfamily: Rhytidinae
- Genus: Rhytidarex; A. W. B. Powell, 1948

Type species
- R. johnsoni

Synonyms
- Rhytida (Rhytidarex) A. W. B. Powell, 1948

= Rhytidarex =

Genus of gastropods

Rhytidarex is a genus of giant land snails belonging to the family Rhytididae. Both members of the genus are endemic to Manawatāwhi / Three Kings Islands in New Zealand.

== Description ==
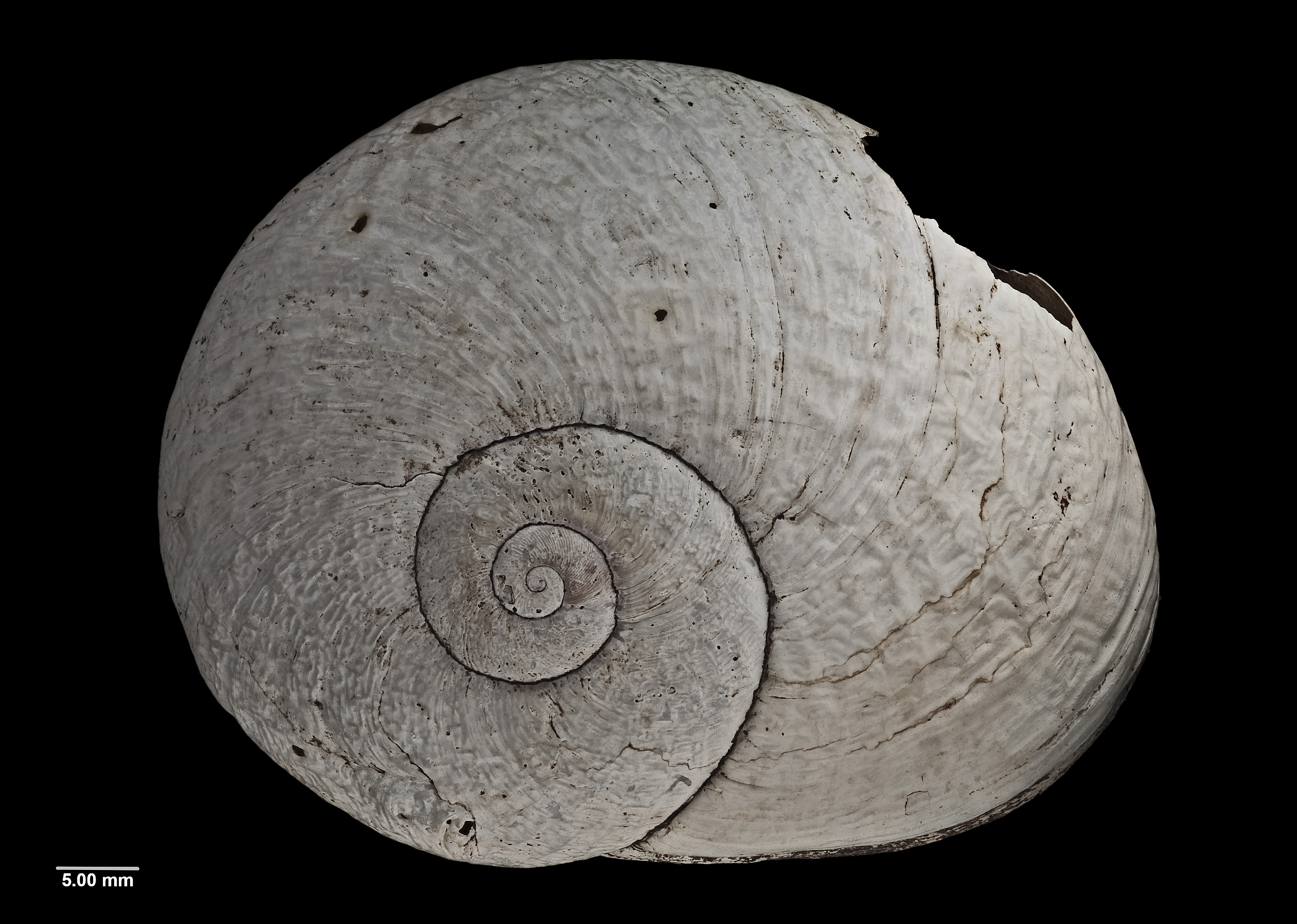
Holotype of R. buddlei

In the original description, Powell described the genus as below:

Although the North East Island Rhytida described below has normal external characteristics, the dentition is quite discordant. In typical Rhytida the dental formula ranges between 12 + 0 + 12 for meesoni and 18 + 1 + 18 for dunniae and patula, All have the aculeate laterals gradually increasing in size, until near the margin, where a disproportionately large and massive tooth occurs, followed by from one to five very small teeth. In the new subgenus Rhytidarex the formula is 33 + 1 + 33, all the laterals are narrowly aculeate, and there is no disproportionately large member. The laterals increase gradually to number 30 and then rapidly decrease, number 33 being only half the size of 30. Actually the radula of Rhytidarerx more closely resembles that of Wainuia, the formula of which ranges between 14 + 1 + 14 for urnula and 26 - 1 + 26 to 27 + 1 + 27 for edwardi. The form of the radula in Wainuia is very similar to that of Rhytidarex, no extra large member, just gradually increasing aculeate laterals to the last but one, the last being half the height of the largest. The thin dark chitinous shell of Wainuia, however, is very different in structure from that of Rhytida, which is strongly reinforced with lime. Protoconch similar to that of greenwoodi, the genotype of Rhytida, but with less distinct radial sculpture.

Shells of the species are moderately large, tending to be 40 mm (1.6 in) in size, but can reach a size of 68 mm (2.7 in). Members of the genus have umbilicate, brown shells, with angled, one-keeled or two-keeled periphery, and can be identified by radula that have a large number of evenly graded aculeate teeth, and by having a highly calcified shell structure.

== Taxonomy ==
Rhytidarex was first described by A. W. B. Powell in 1948 as a subgenus. Powell named Rhytida (Rhytidarex) johnsoni as the type species. Rhytidarex was raised to genus status by Frank Climo in 1977. The holotypes of both known species are held by the Auckland War Memorial Museum.

Phylogenetic analysis suggests that the genus is one of the most basal genera of New Zealand Rhytididae, splitting from mainland New Zealand members of the family between 3.4-11.6 million years before the present.

== Distribution ==
Both species are endemic to Manawatāwhi / Three Kings Islands.

== Species ==
Species within the genus Rhytidarex include:

- Rhytidarex buddlei (A. W. B. Powell, 1948)
- Rhytidarex johnsoni (A. W. B. Powell, 1948)
