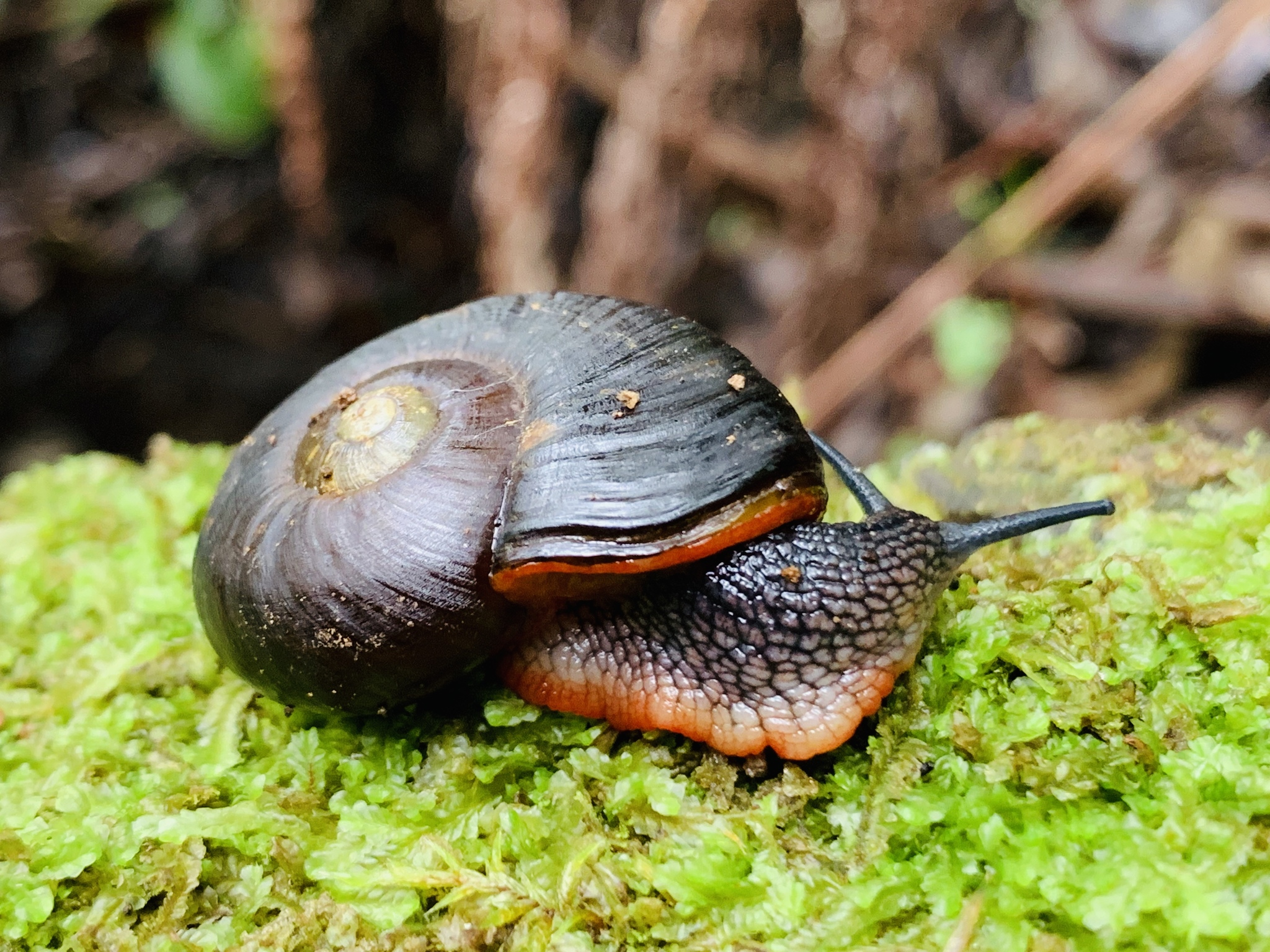
- Victaphanta atramentaria

Scientific classification
- Kingdom: Animalia
- Phylum: Mollusca
- Class: Gastropoda
- Order: Stylommatophora
- Family: Rhytididae
- Subfamily: Rhytidinae
- Genus: Victaphanta; Iredale, 1933

Synonyms
- Melavitrina Iredale, T. 1933

= Victaphanta =

Genus of gastropods

Victaphanta is a genus of carnivorous air-breathing land snails, terrestrial pulmonate gastropod mollusks in the family Rhytididae.

== Distribution ==
This genus is endemic to Australia and occurs in Victoria and Tasmania

== Species ==
Species within the genus Victaphanta include:

- Victaphanta atramentaria
- Victaphanta compacta
- Victaphanta lampra
- Victaphanta milligani
