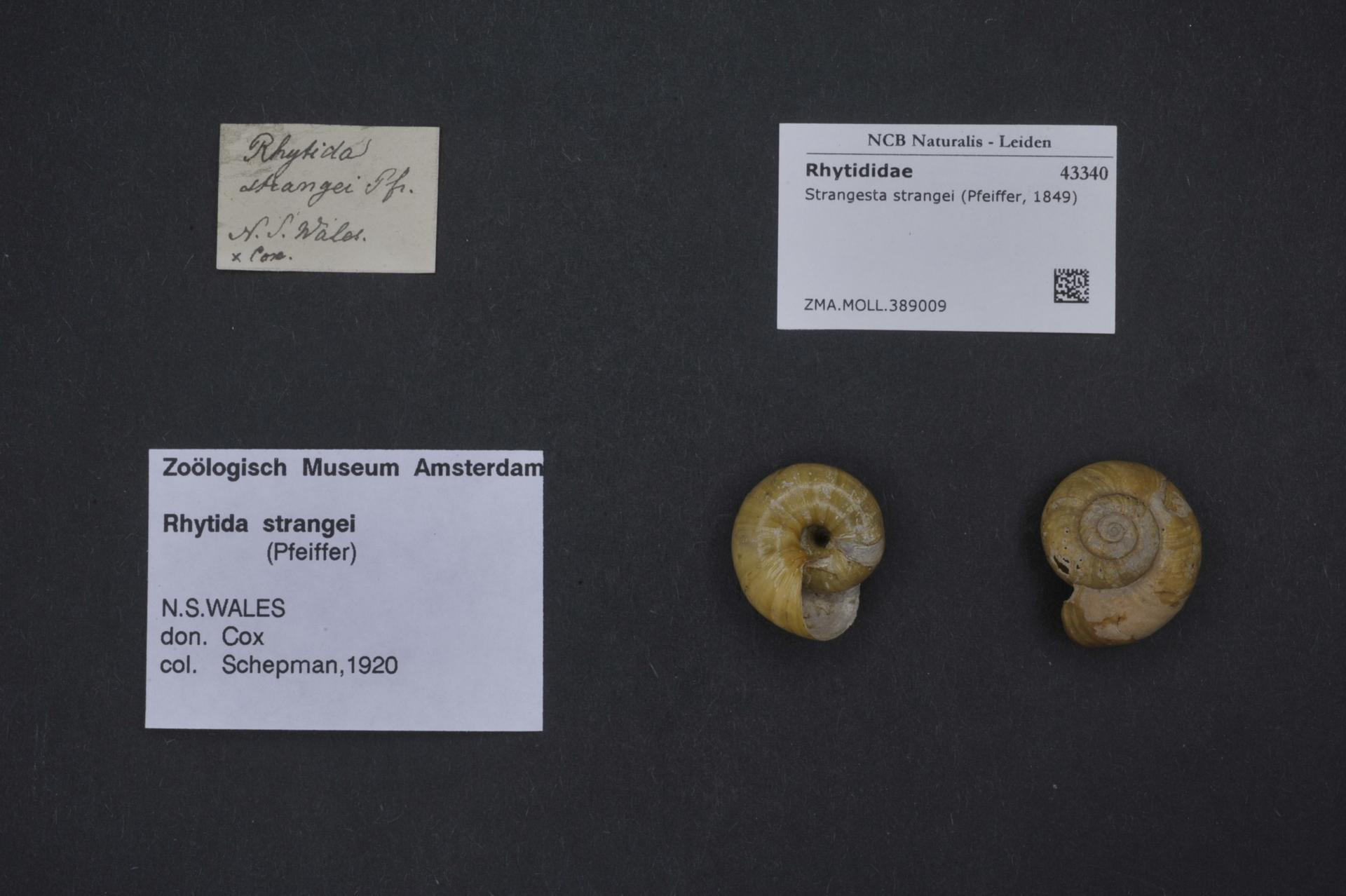
- Strangesta strangei

Scientific classification
- Kingdom: Animalia
- Phylum: Mollusca
- Class: Gastropoda
- Order: Stylommatophora
- Family: Rhytididae
- Subfamily: Rhytidinae
- Genus: Strangesta; Iredale, 1937

= Strangesta =

Genus of land snails

Strangesta is a genus of gastropods belonging to the family Rhytididae.

The species of this genus are found in Australia.

Species:

- Strangesta confusa (L.Pfeiffer, 1855)
- Strangesta maxima (Mousson, 1869)
- Strangesta ramsayi (Cox, 1868)
- Strangesta strangei Pfeiffer, 1849
