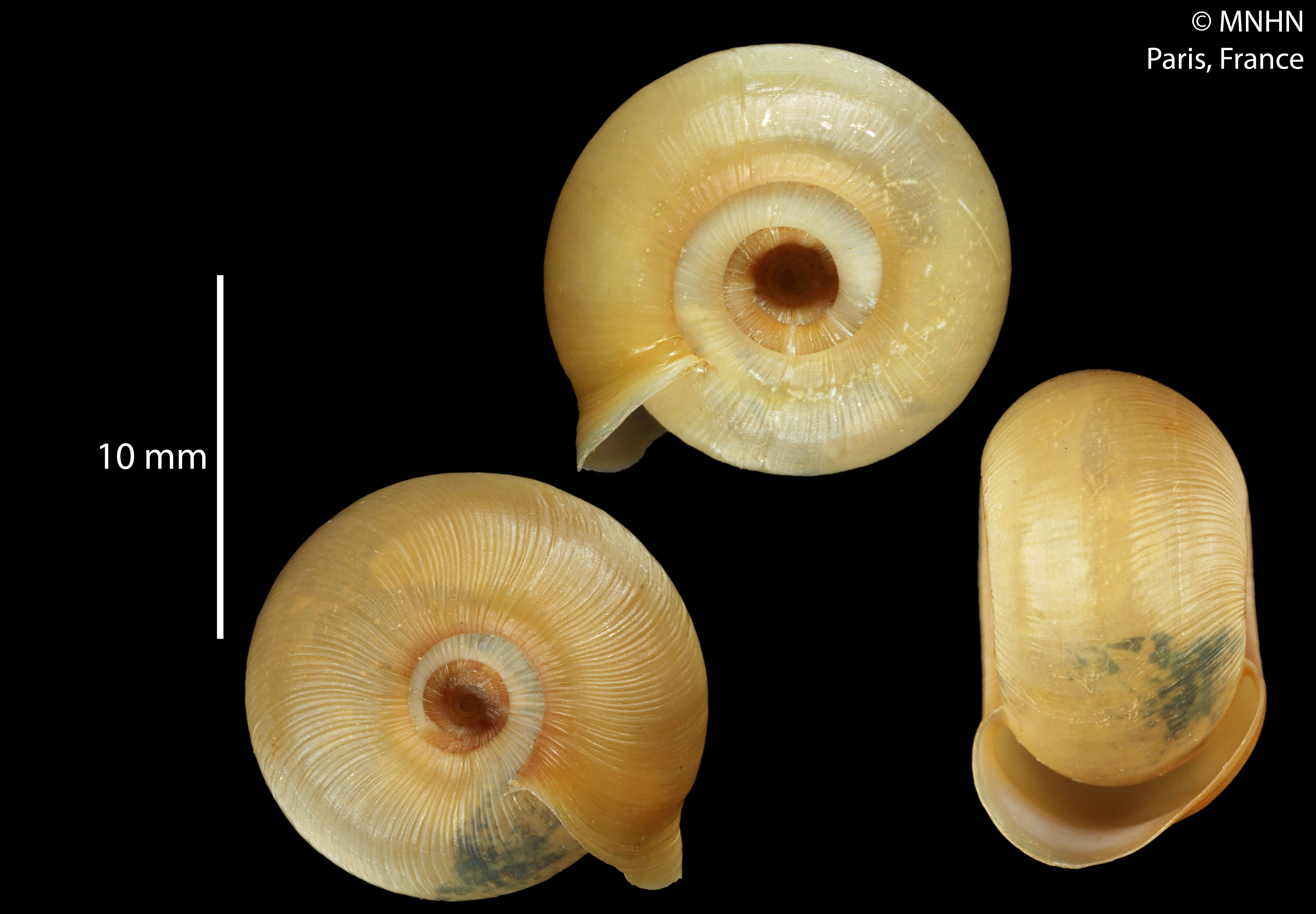
- Shell of Pseudomphalus megei (specimen at MNHN, Paris)

Scientific classification
- Kingdom: Animalia
- Phylum: Mollusca
- Class: Gastropoda
- Order: Stylommatophora
- Infraorder: Rhytidoidei
- Superfamily: Rhytidoidea
- Family: Rhytididae
- Genus: Pseudomphalus; Ancey, 1882

Type species
- Helix megei Lambert, 1873

Synonyms
- Diplomphalus (Pseudomphalus) Ancey, 1882

= Pseudomphalus =

Genus of gastropods

Pseudomphalus is a monotypic genus of large, air-breathing land snails, pulmonate gastropods in the subfamily Rhytidinae of the family Rhytididae.

== Species ==
- Pseudomphalus megei (Lambert, 1873): endemic to New Caledonia.
