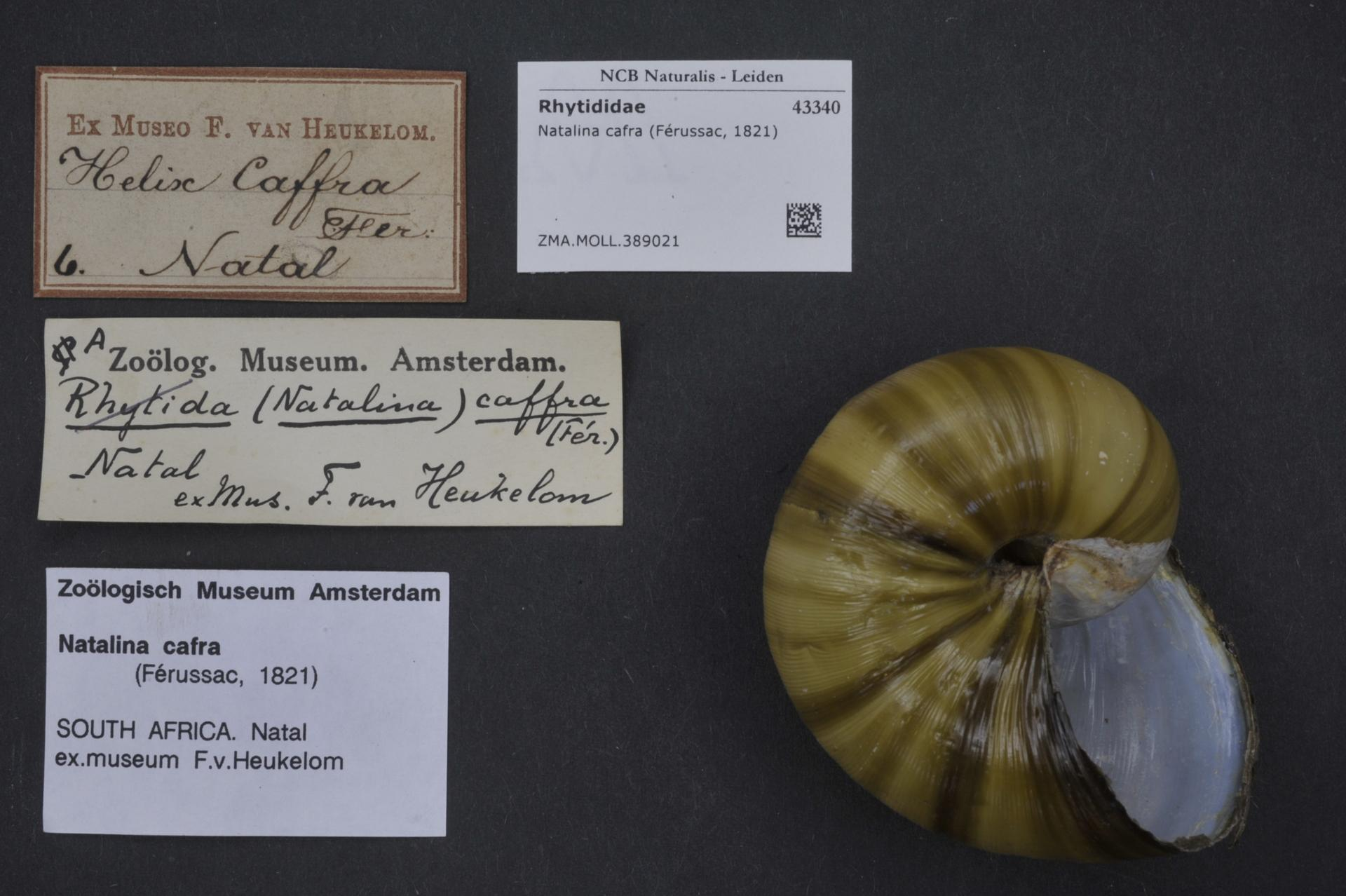

Scientific classification
- Domain: Eukaryota
- Kingdom: Animalia
- Phylum: Mollusca
- Class: Gastropoda
- Order: Stylommatophora
- Family: Rhytididae
- Subfamily: Chlamydephorinae
- Genus: Natalina; Pilsbry, 1893

Type species
- Helix cafra A. Férussac, 1821

= Natalina =

Genus of gastropods

Natalina is a genus of medium-sized predatory air-breathing land snails, carnivorous terrestrial pulmonate gastropod molluscs in the family Rhytididae.

== Species ==
Species within the genus Natalina include:

- Natalina beyrichi (E. von Martens, 1890) (Pondoland cannibal snail)
- Natalina cafra (A. Férussac, 1821) (Common cannibal snail)
- Natalina quekettiana (Melvill & Ponsonby, 1893) (Mistbelt cannibal snail)
- Natalina reenenensis Connolly, 1939
- Natalina wesseliana (Kobelt, 1876) (Maputo cannibal snail)
