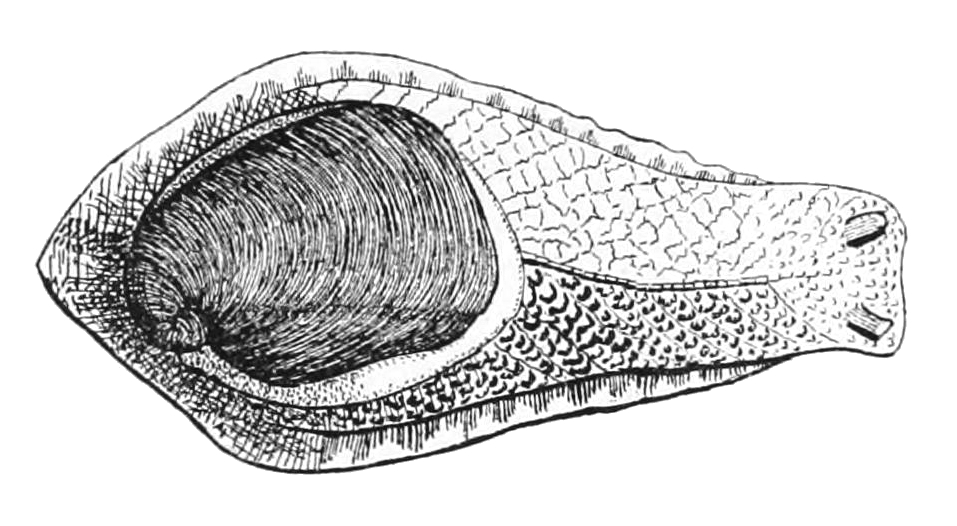
- Drawing of dorsal view of alcohol-preserved specimen of Schizoglossa novoseelandica.

Scientific classification
- Kingdom: Animalia
- Phylum: Mollusca
- Class: Gastropoda
- Order: Stylommatophora
- Family: Rhytididae
- Subfamily: Rhytidinae
- Genus: Schizoglossa; Hedley, 1893

Species
- See text

= Schizoglossa =

Genus of gastropods

Schizoglossa, common name the Pāua slugs, is a genus of medium-sized to large predatory, air-breathing, land slugs, carnivorous terrestrial pulmonate gastropod molluscs in the family Rhytididae. They are currently classified by the New Zealand Department of Conservation as Nationally Vulnerable.

== Distribution ==
The genus is endemic to the North Island of New Zealand (including the Great Barrier Island),

== Species and subspecies ==
Species and subspecies within the genus Schizoglossa include:

- Schizoglossa gigantea Powell, 1930
- Schizoglossa major Powell, 1938 - subfossil only
- Schizoglossa novoseelandica (Pfeiffer, 1862)
  - Schizoglossa novoseelandica novoseelandica (Pfeiffer, 1862)
  - Schizoglossa novoseelandica barrierensis Powell, 1949
- Schizoglossa worthyae Powell, 1949

== Description ==
The shell is small, rudimentary, auriform (ear-shaped) and is situated far back on the animal. The shell is incapable of containing the body, and is reduced to the function of a shield for the lungs and heart. The shell is paucispiral, and is nacreous within. The columella is excavated into a pit for the reception of the shell-muscle.

The animal has no rachidian teeth.

== Ecology ==
Schizoglossa has eggs with a calcareous surface which lacks cuticle.
