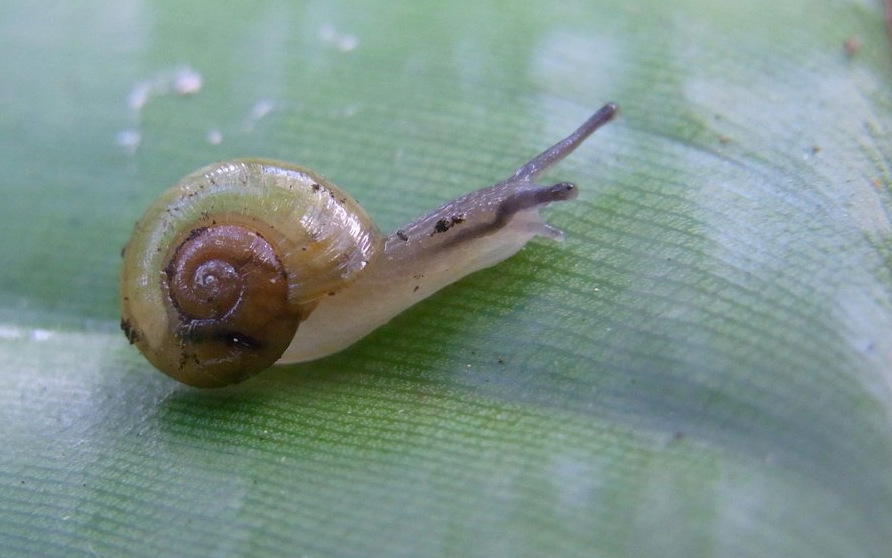
- An active individual of Vitellidelos dulcis from a garden in NSW, Australia

Scientific classification
- Kingdom: Animalia
- Phylum: Mollusca
- Class: Gastropoda
- Order: Stylommatophora
- Family: Rhytididae
- Genus: Vitellidelos; Stanisic, 2010

= Vitellidelos =

Genus of gastropods

Vitellidelos is a genus of land snails in the family Rhytididae. This genus is found in Australia.

Species include:

- Vitellidelos costata – strong-ribbed carnivorous snail
- Vitellidelos dorrigoensis – Dorrigo carnivorous snail
- Vitellidelos dulcis – Sydney carnivorous snail
- Vitellidelos helmsiana – Snowy Mountains carnivorous snail
- Vitellidelos kaputarensis – Mount Kaputar carnivorous snail
