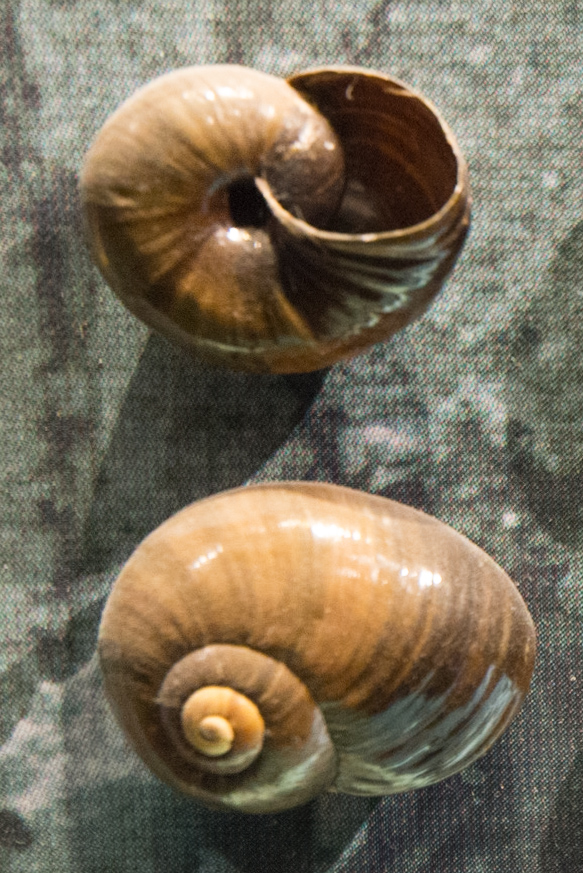
- Powelliphanta spedeni lateumbilicata at Te Papa

Scientific classification
- Kingdom: Animalia
- Phylum: Mollusca
- Class: Gastropoda
- Order: Stylommatophora
- Family: Rhytididae
- Genus: Powelliphanta
- Species: P. spedeni

Binomial name
- Powelliphanta spedeni (Powell, 1932)

= Powelliphanta spedeni =

Species of gastropod

Powelliphanta spedeni, known as one of the amber snails, is a species of large, carnivorous land snail, a terrestrial pulmonate gastropod mollusc in the family Rhytididae.

== Distribution ==
This species is endemic to the South Island of New Zealand. There are two subspecies:

- Powelliphanta spedeni spedeni Powell, 1932
- Powelliphanta spedeni lateumbilicata Powell, 1946

== Description ==
The shell of Powelliphanta spedeni reaches a maximum size of 40 mm.

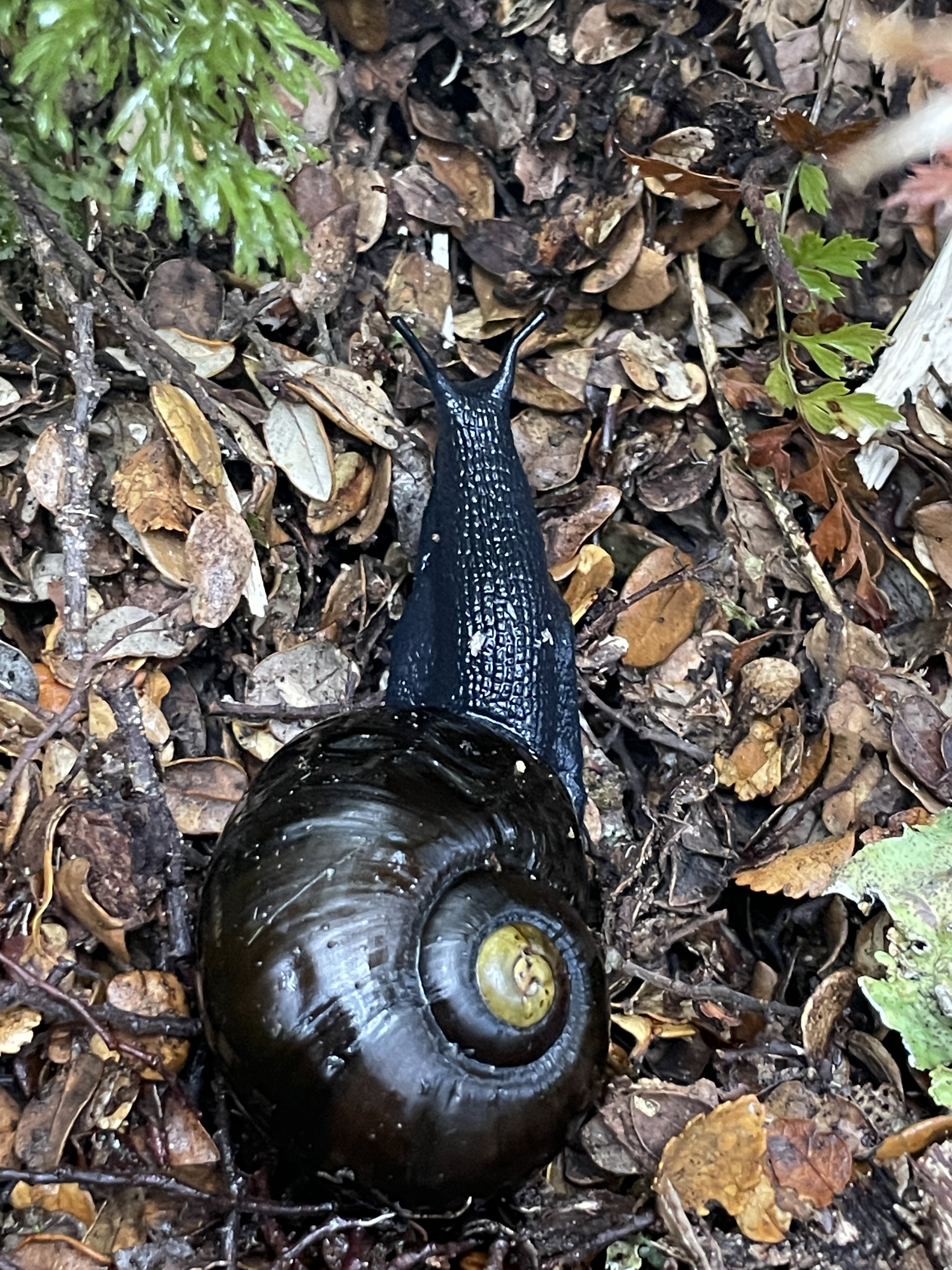
Powelliphanta spedeni

== Life cycle ==
Powelliphanta spedeni produces an egg up to the size of 11.5 mm. Shape of the eggs is oval and seldom constant in dimensions 11.5 × 9 mm, 11 × 9 mm, 9 × 7.75 mm. Its eggs are laid in March.
