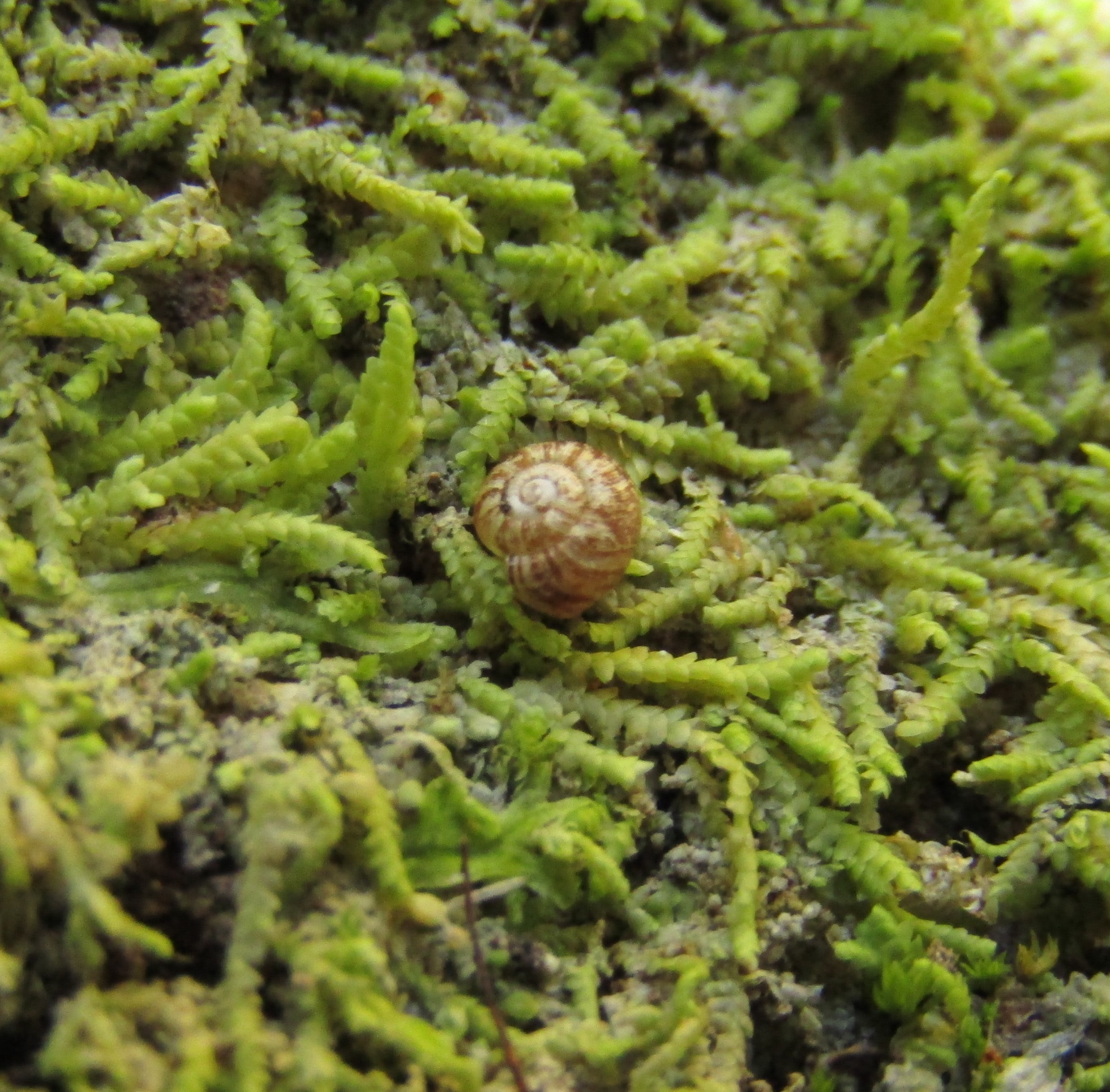
- Delos coresia in New Zealand

Scientific classification
- Kingdom: Animalia
- Phylum: Mollusca
- Class: Gastropoda
- Order: Stylommatophora
- Family: Rhytididae
- Subfamily: Rhytidinae
- Genus: Delos; Hutton, 1904

Type species
- Zonites coresia J. E. Gray, 1850

Species
- Delos coresia (J. E. Gray, 1850); Delos jeffreysiana (Reeve, 1852); Delos oualanensis (Pease, 1866); Delos regia Climo, 1973; Delos striata Climo, 1973

Synonyms
- Delos (Delos) F. W. Hutton, 1904; Elaea F. W. Hutton, 1883 (not Elaea Stål, 1877); Rhenea F. W. Hutton, 1893

= Delos (gastropod) =

Genus of gastropods

Delos is a genus of air-breathing land snails, terrestrial pulmonate gastropod mollusks in the family Rhytididae.

== Species ==
Species within the genus Delos include:

- Delos ceresia
- Delos coresia
- Delos gardineri (E. A. Smith, 1897)
- Delos gradata
- Delos jeffreysiana
- Delos oualanensis
- Delos regia
- Delos striata
