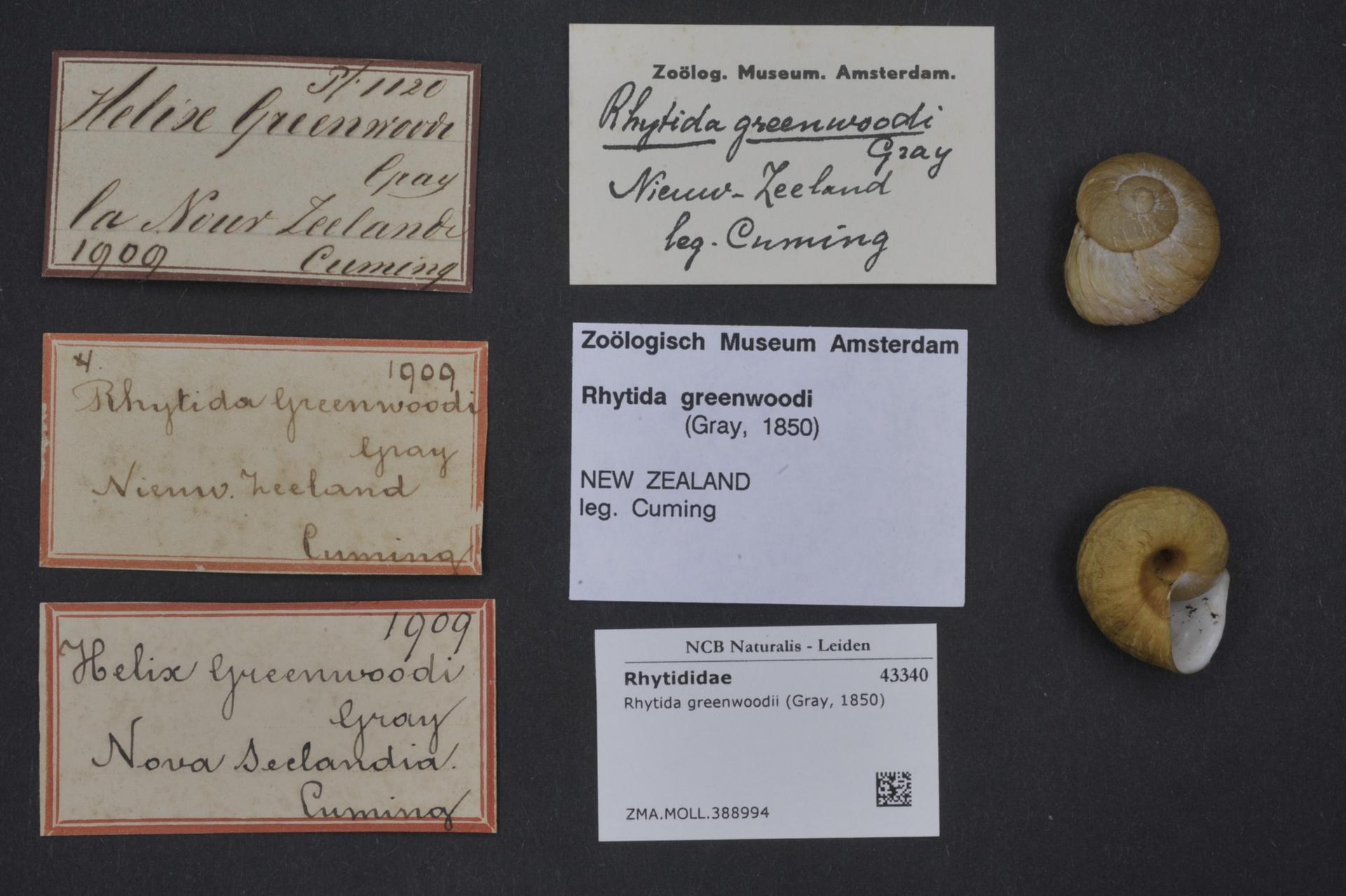
- Rhytida greenwoodii shells

Scientific classification
- Kingdom: Animalia
- Phylum: Mollusca
- Class: Gastropoda
- Order: Stylommatophora
- Family: Rhytididae
- Subfamily: Rhytidinae
- Genus: Rhytida; Martens, 1860

Species
- See text

= Rhytida =

Genus of gastropods

Rhytida is a genus of medium-sized, air-breathing, predatory land snails, terrestrial pulmonate gastropod molluscs in the family Rhytididae.

This is the type genus of the family.

== Distribution ==
This genus is endemic to New Zealand.

== Species ==
Species and subspecies recognised in the genus Rhytida are:

- Rhytida australis Hutton, 1883 Stewart Island / Rakiura
- Rhytida citrina Hutton, 1883 South Island
- Rhytida greenwoodi
  - Rhytida greenwoodi greenwoodi (Gray, 1950) North Island
  - Rhytida greenwoodi webbi Powell, 1949 South Island
- Rhytida meesoni
  - Rhytida meesoni meesoni Suter, 1891 South Island
  - Rhytida meesoni perampla Powell, 1946 South Island
- Rhytida oconnori Powell, 1946 South Island
- Rhytida otagoensis Powell, 1930 South Island
- Rhytida patula Hutton, 1883 South Island
- Rhytida stephenensis Powell, 1930 Stephens Island, Cook Strait

Note that the species/subspecies status of some of the above taxa is unclear and differs between sources.
