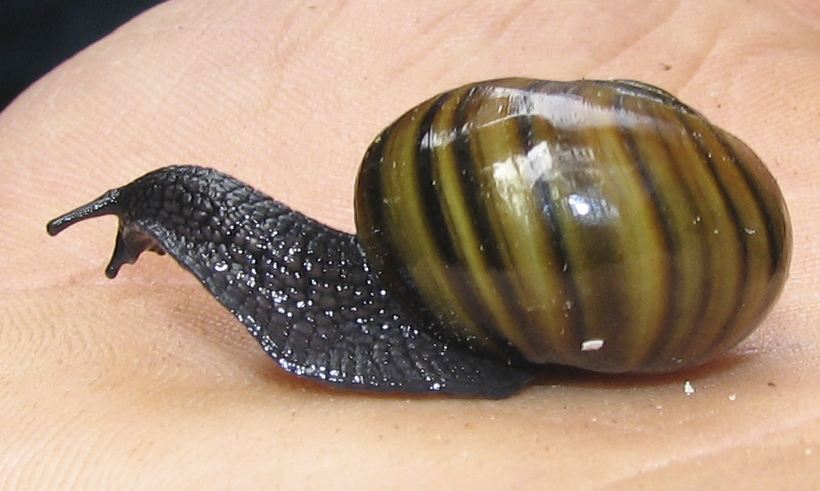
- A live Powelliphanta augusta from the upper Waimangaroa River.

Scientific classification
- Kingdom: Animalia
- Phylum: Mollusca
- Class: Gastropoda
- Order: Stylommatophora
- Suborder: Helicina
- Infraorder: Rhytidoidei
- Superfamily: Rhytidoidea
- Family: Rhytididae; Pilsbry, 1893

= Rhytididae =

Family of gastropods

Rhytididae is a taxonomic family of medium-sized predatory air-breathing land snails, carnivorous terrestrial pulmonate gastropod molluscs in the superfamily Rhytidoidea.

This family has three subfamilies:

- Chlamydephorinae Cockerell, 1935 (1903)
- Rhytidinae Pilsbry, 1893
- Corillinae Pilsbry, 1905

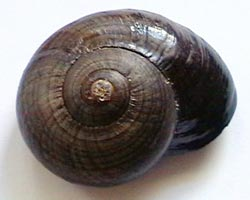
A shell of Powelliphanta hochstetteri hochstetteri.

== Anatomy ==
In this family, the number of haploid chromosomes lies between 26 and 35 (according to the values in this table).

== Distribution ==
This family of land snails has a range which extends from South Africa to New Guinea, some of the higher South Pacific islands, New Zealand and Australia.

The New Zealand genera include Delos, Delouagapia, Paryphanta, Powelliphanta, Rhytida, Wainuia and Schizoglossa. These, however, probably do not form a monophyletic group, as indicated by their differences in their size, shape and radular morphology.

== Genera ==
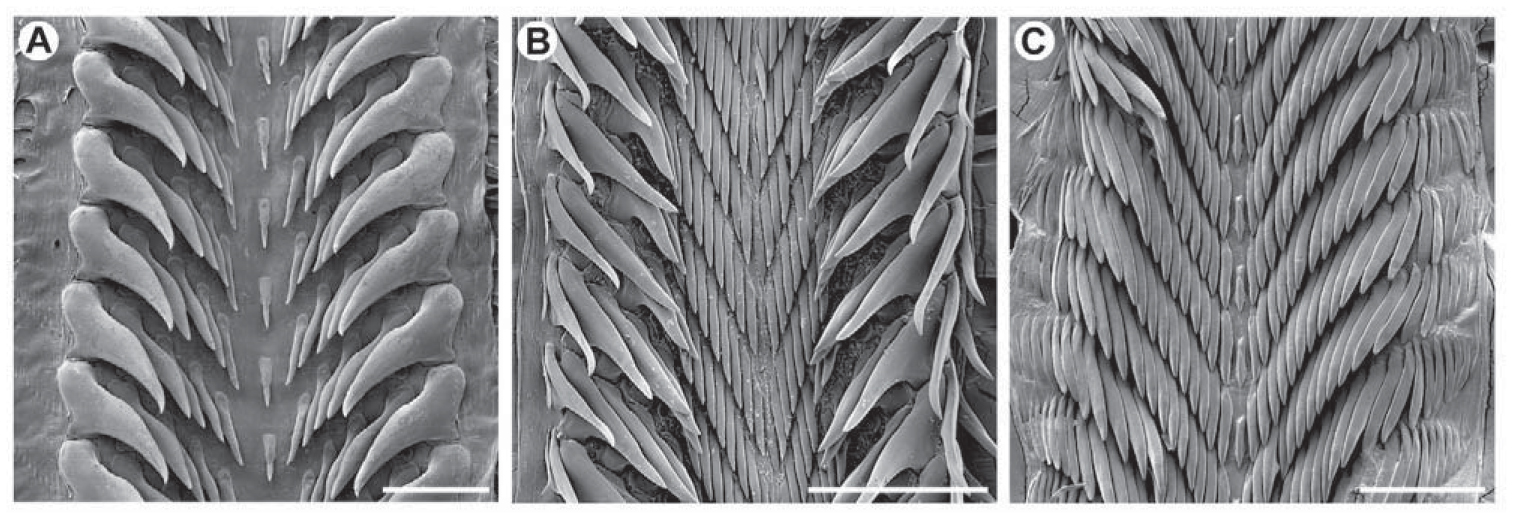
Radulae of three species representing three Rhytidae genera. (A) Natalina beyrichi, scale bar = 1.0 mm; (B) Afrorhytida kraussi, scale bar = 500 μm; (C) Capitina calcicola sp., scale bar = 250 μm.

Genera within the family Rhytididae include:

- Afrorhytida
- Amborhytida
- Austrorhytida
- Capitina
- Delos
- Delouagapia
- Diplomphalus
- Echotrida
- Hebridelos
- Macrocycloides
- Namoitena
- Nata
- Natalina
- Occirhenea
- Ouagapia
- Paryphanta
- Protorugosa
- Powelliphanta
- Prolesophanta
- Pseudomphalus Ancey, 1882
- Ptychorhytida
- Rhytida
- Rhytidarex
- Saladelos
- Schizoglossa
- Strangesta
- Tasmaphena
- Terrycarlessia
- Torresiropa
- Victaphanta
- Vitellidelos
- Wainuia

== Life cycle ==
Eggs of New Zealand's species are generally deposited in leaf mould. Eggs are usually laid from late October to early December, with exception in some species as Powelliphanta spedeni in March.
