= Fenian Track =

New Zealand tramping track

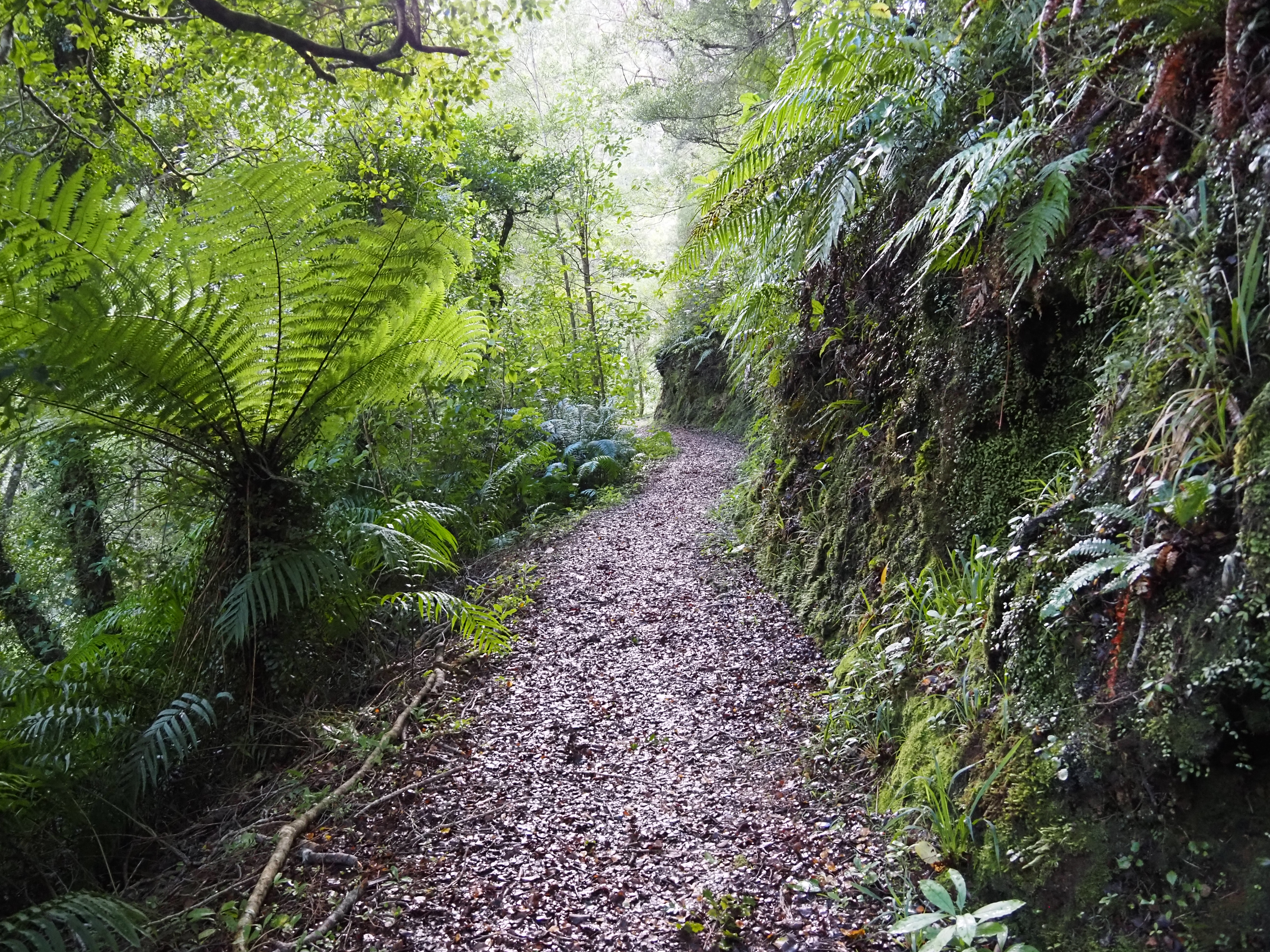
- Fenian Track above the Ōpārara River
- Length: 4.3 km (2.7 mi)
- Location: Kahurangi National Park
- Trailheads: Fenian Road car park 41°12′36″S 172°09′16″E; Fenian Caves loop 41°12′02″S 172°11′08″E
- Use: Tramping
- Sights: Limestone caves; Dense forest; Gold Mine
- Maintained by: Department of Conservation

The Fenian Track is a historic walking track in Kahurangi National Park, in the West Coast Region of New Zealand. The track was originally constructed as a bridle track, to provide improved access to a gold mining site in Fenian Creek. Gold was discovered in the creek in the 1860s, but the bulk of the West Coast gold rush was happening at more accessible claims further south, so it took nearly twenty years for mining to begin. Construction of the path began at Market Cross, Karamea, in 1876, but it was not completed all the way to Fenian Creek until 1904. Returns from gold mining here were poor; although mining revived in the 1930s during the Great Depression, even with government assistance it was not a profitable claim.

The route of the track follows the true left of the Ōpārara River, cut into slopes above the river. It ends at a replica miners' hut at Adams Flat. The track passes through mixed beech-podocarp and beech forest typical of the area, and features the karst geology of the region. The forest is a mixture of old growth and areas that have been felled. Three species of southern beech are present: red beech (Nothofagus fusca), silver beech (N. menziesii), and hard beech (N. truncata); the main podocarp species are miro (Prumnopitys ferruginea), yellow-silver pine (Lepidothamnus intermedius), and rimu (Dacrydium cupressinum). Quintinia serrata and kāmahi (Pterophylla racemosa) are present in the understorey. Forest birds like kererū, kākā, bellbirds, South Island robins, grey warblers, brown creepers, and weka are moderately common. This is also one of the few places where the large carnivorous landsnail Powelliphanta annectens can be found, as predators have driven it extinct in most other areas. In 1962 entomologist Ian Townsend collected a small harvestman of the genus Hendea near the entrance of one of the Fenian caves, and Forster named it Hendea townsendi after him.

Flora and fauna

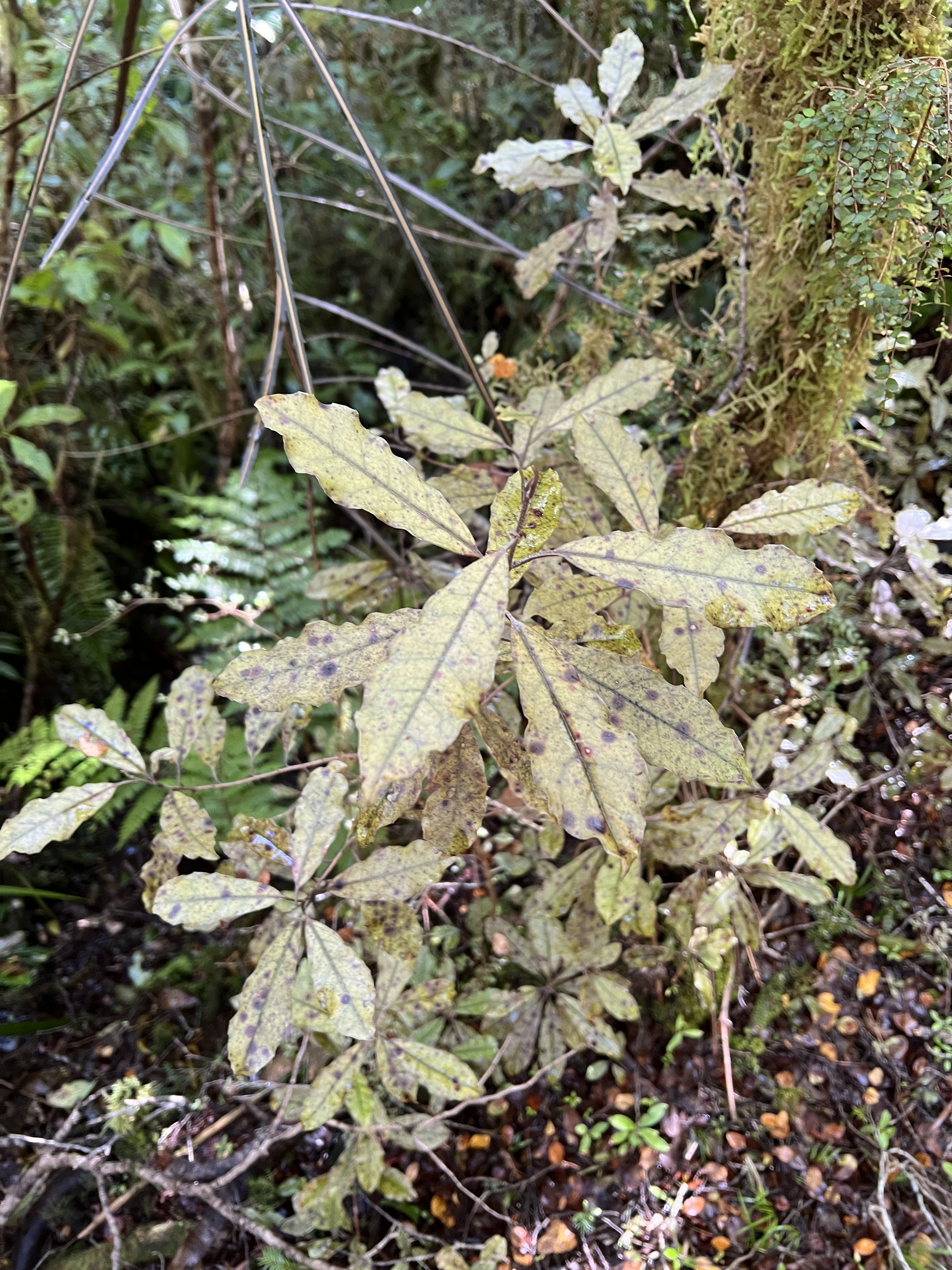
Quintinia serrata

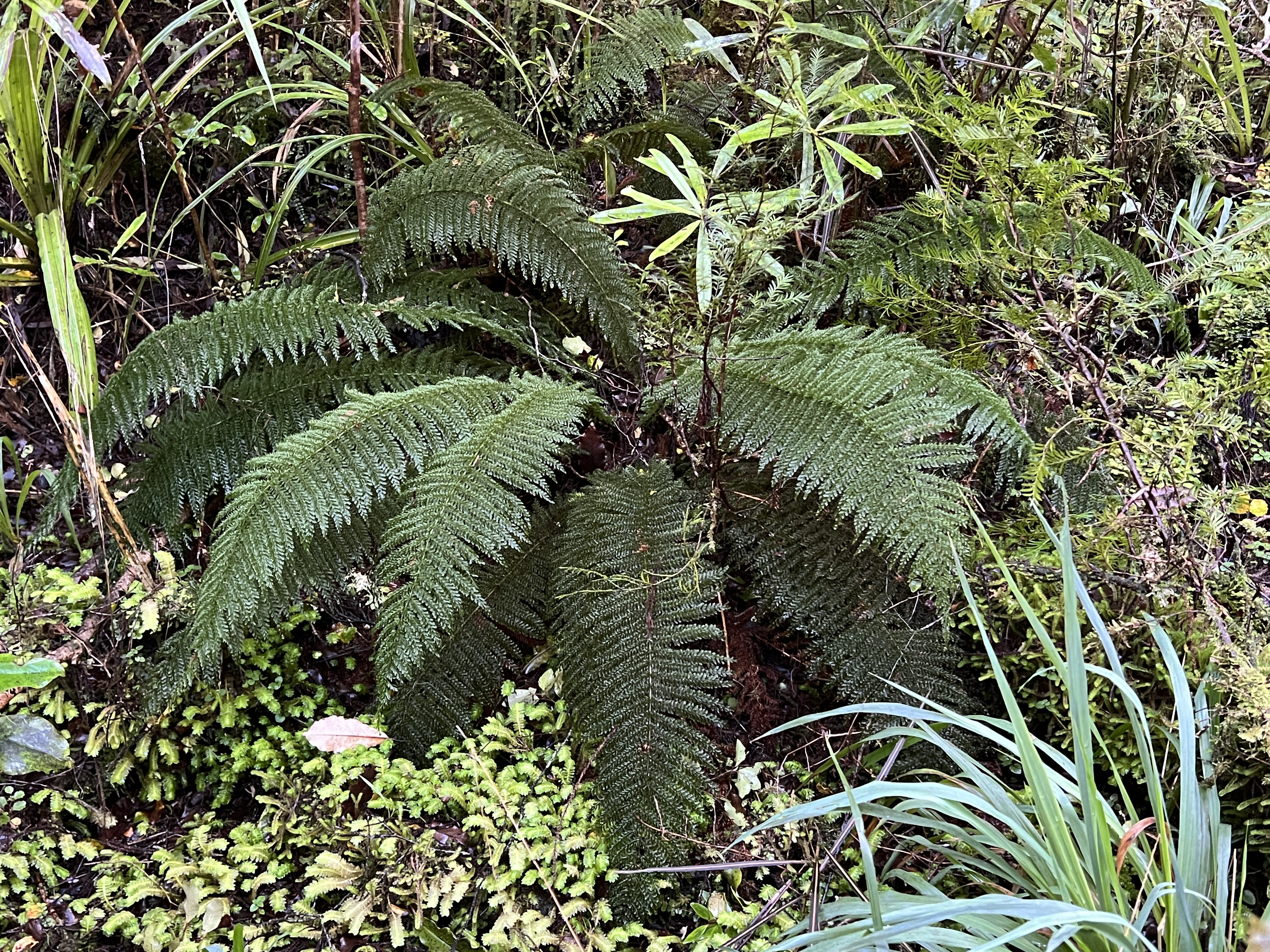
Prince of Wales fern

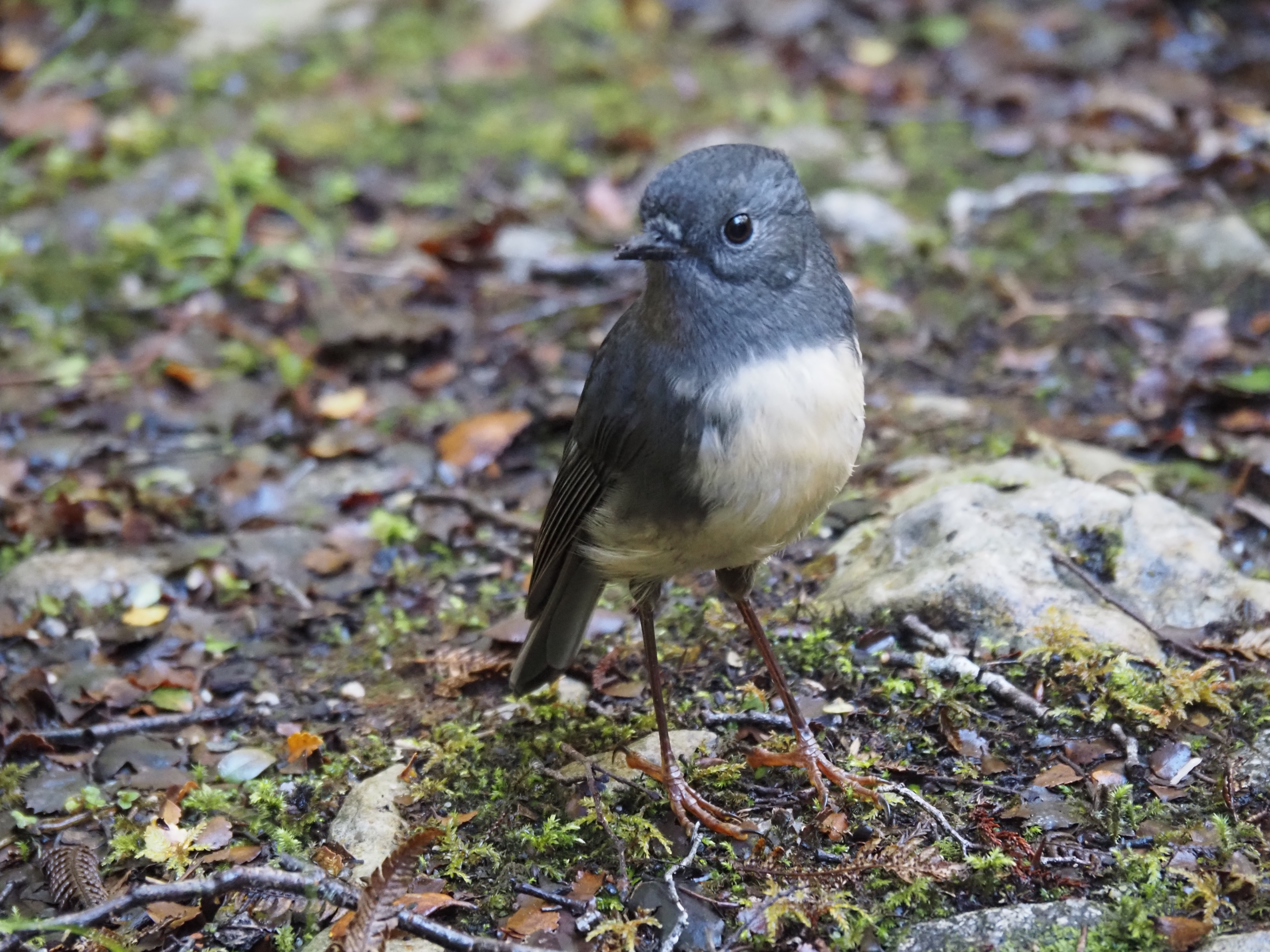
Petroica australis

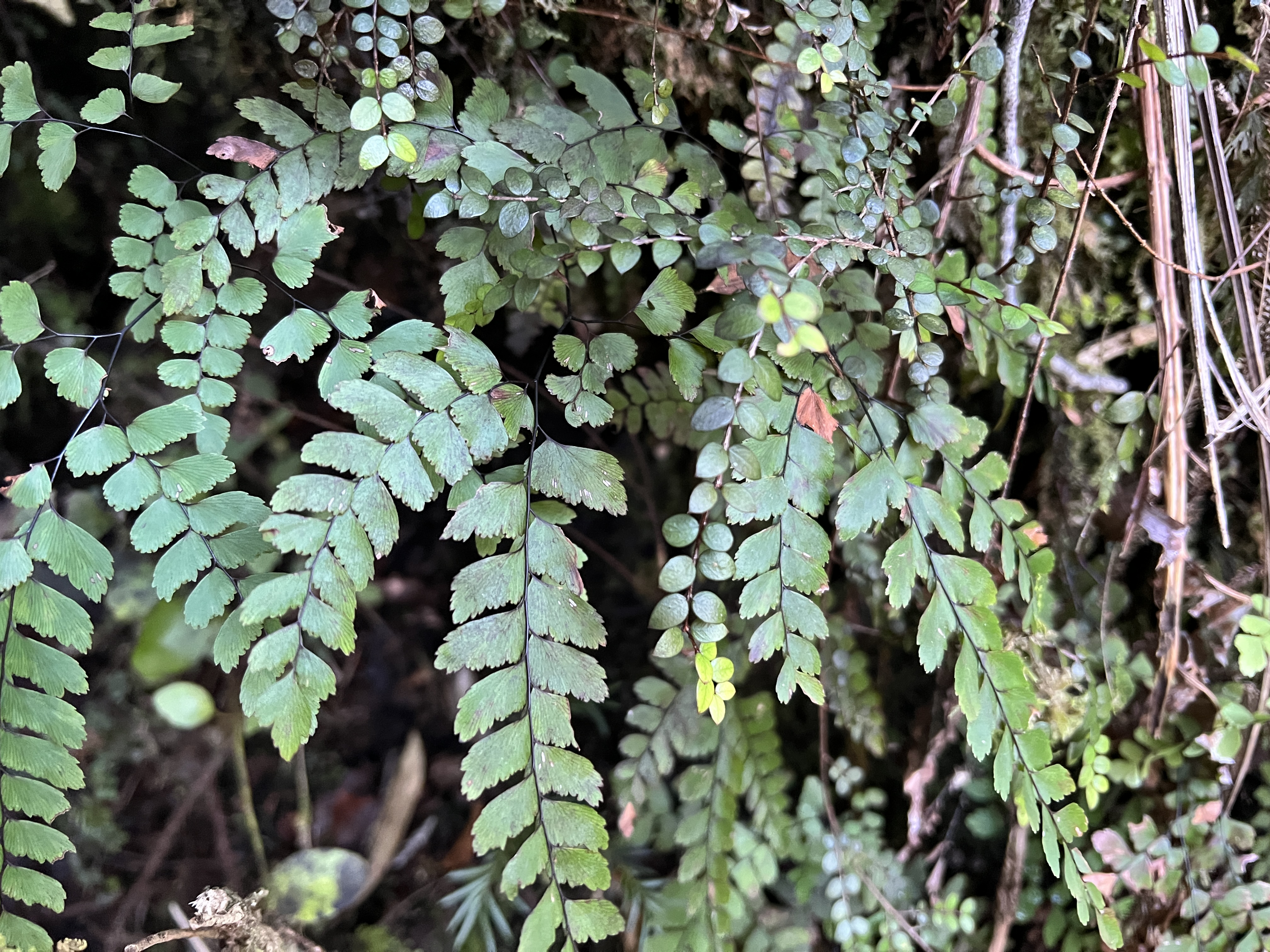
Adiantum cunninghami

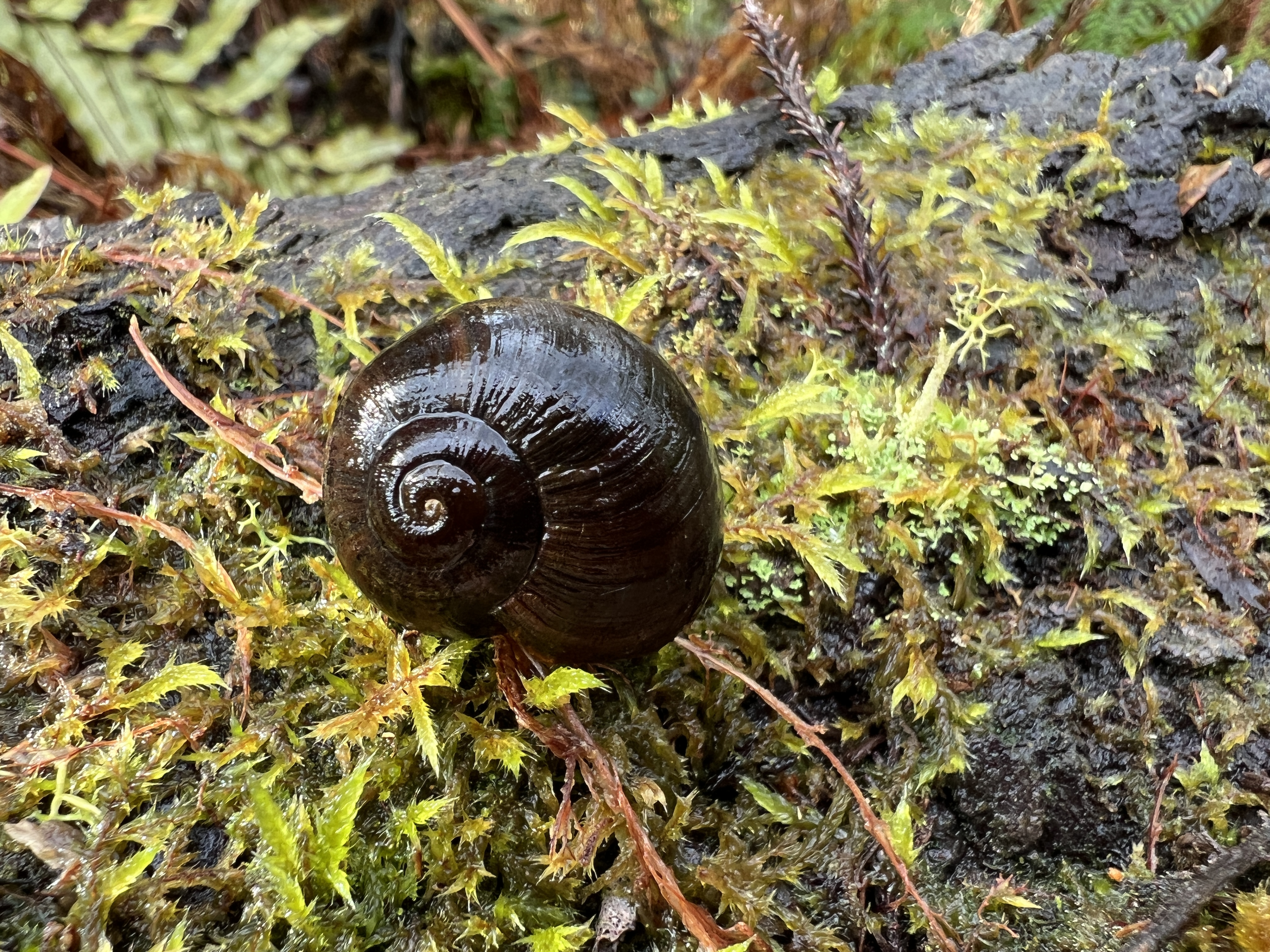
Powelliphanta annectens

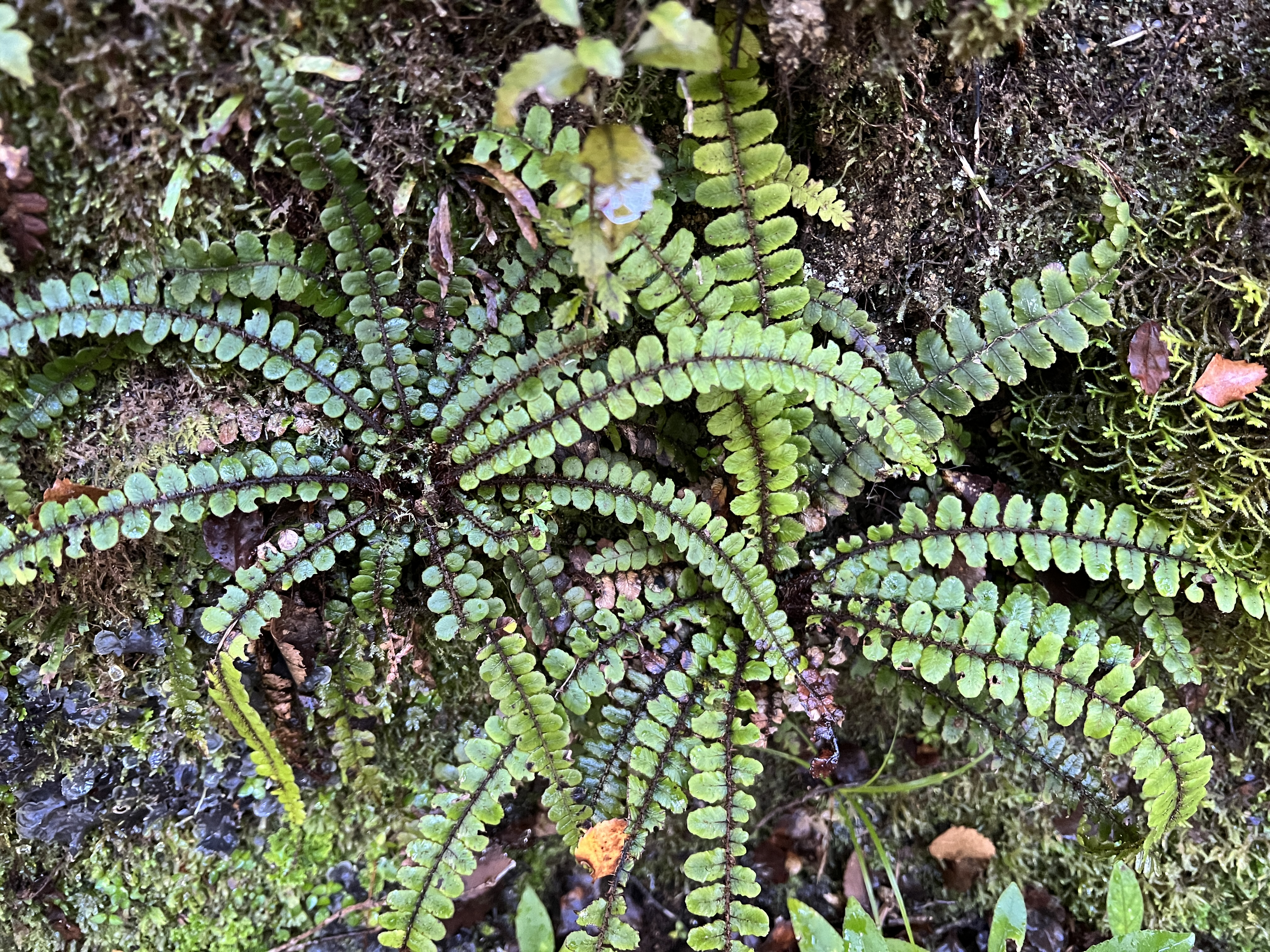
Cranfillia fluviatilis

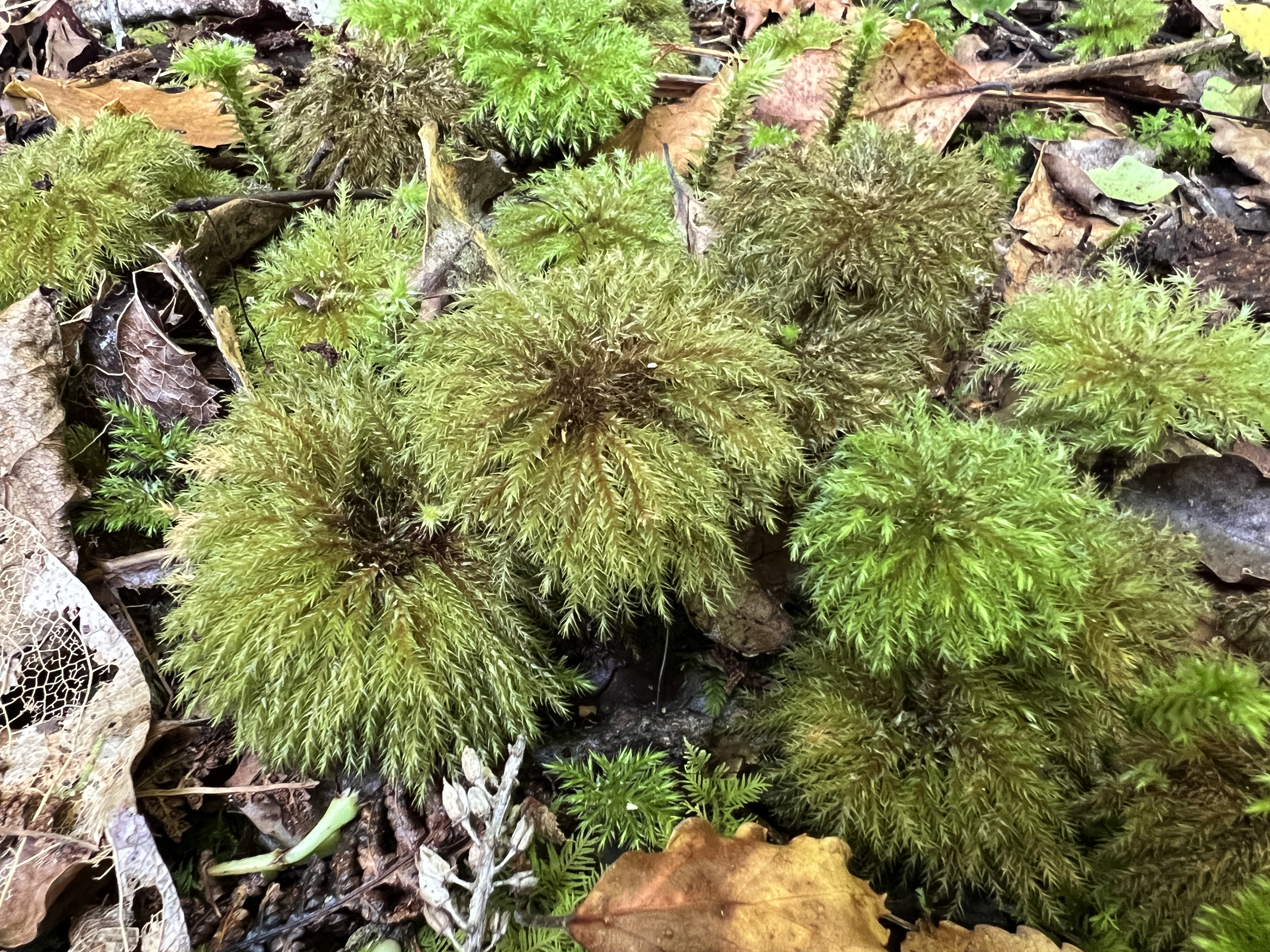
Mniodendron comatum

The Fenian Caves Track is a loop from the main Fenian Track and includes an 80 metres (260 ft) underground section through Tunnel Cave—this requires sturdy footwear and a light source. The three short limestone caves on the loop, a popular visitor attraction, are:

- Miner's Cave
- Tunnel Cave
  These are both limestone caves with small streams which have dissolved parts of the walls and floors back to granite. They contain stalactites and stalagmites, as well as fauna like cave wētā, glow-worms, and Spelungula, New Zealand's largest spider. Near Tunnel Cave is a dry cave which no longer contains a stream, but has a good population of Spelungula.
- Cavern Creek Cave
  The stream here is much wider and the cave more flood-prone, with no cave formations.
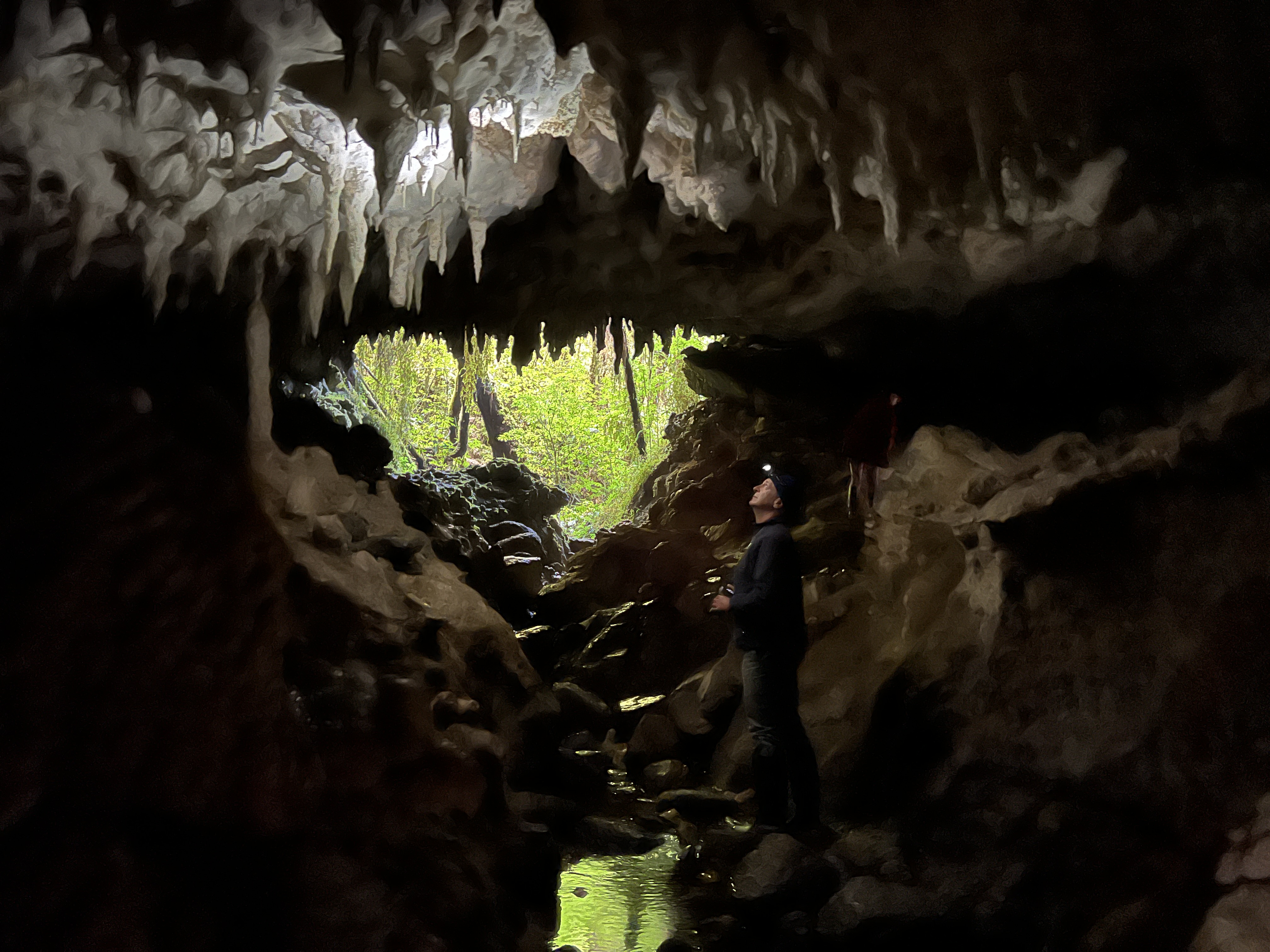
Miner's Cave

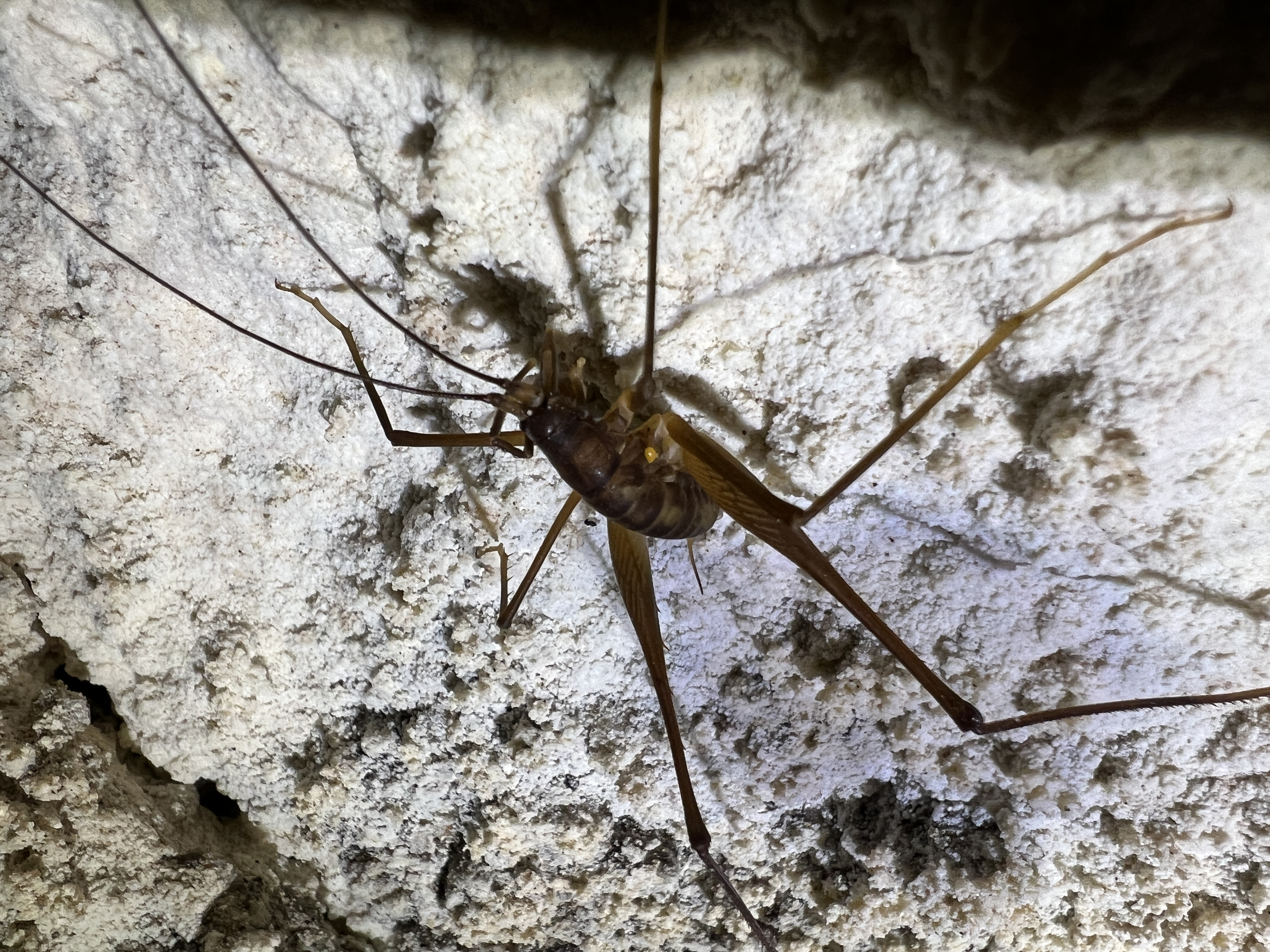
Cave wētā in Miner's Cave

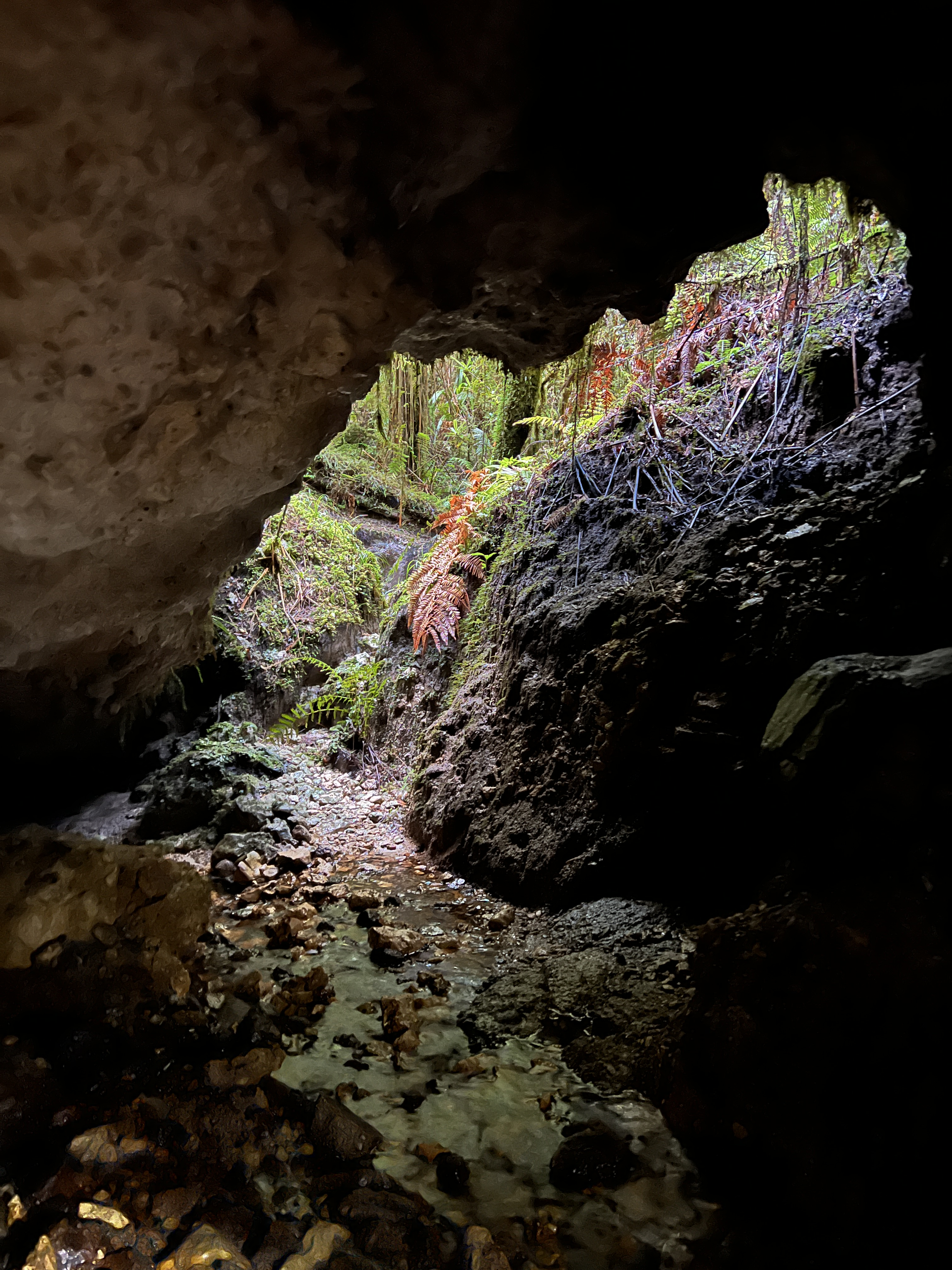
Tunnel Cave

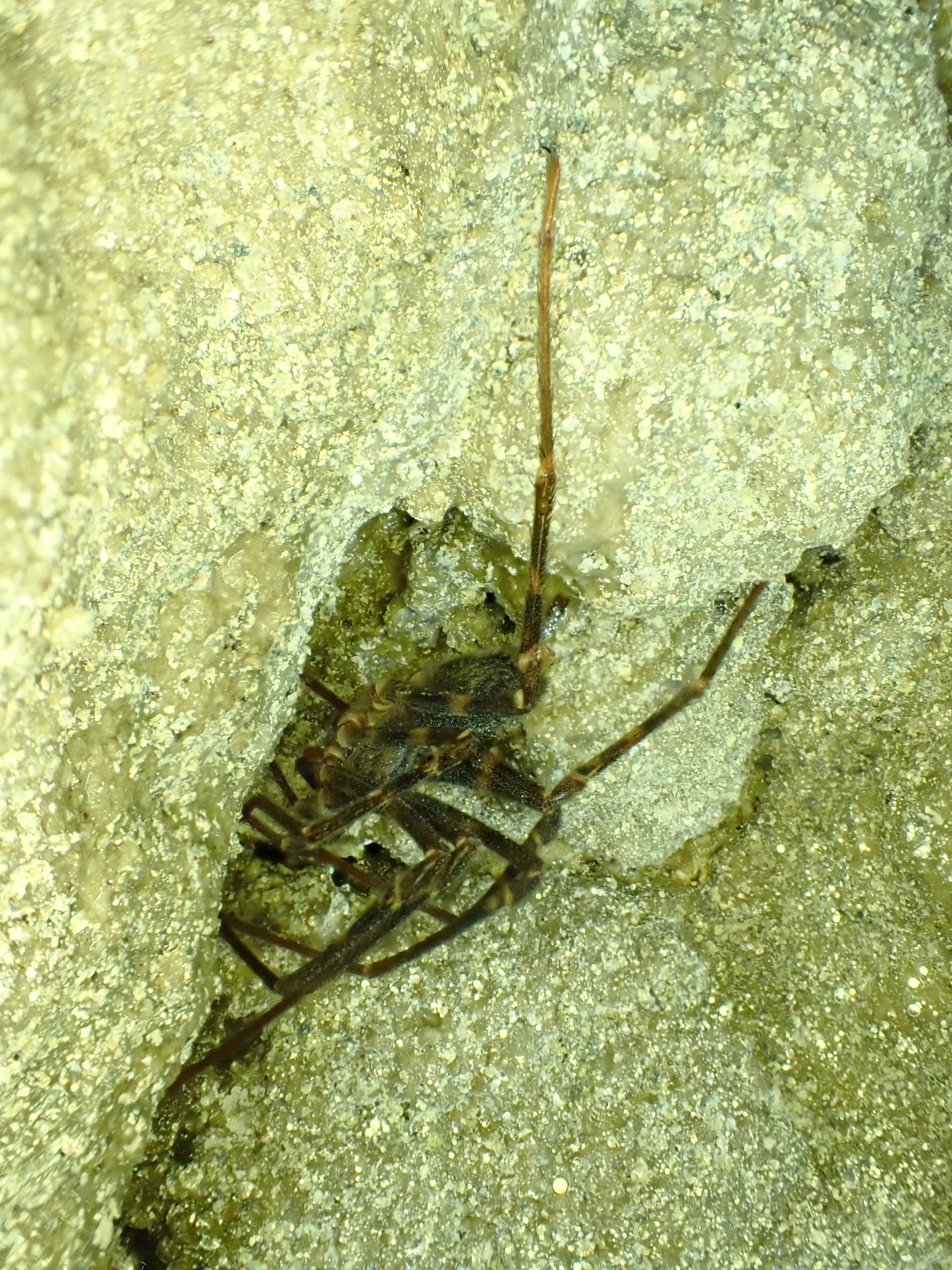
Spelungula in Tunnel Cave

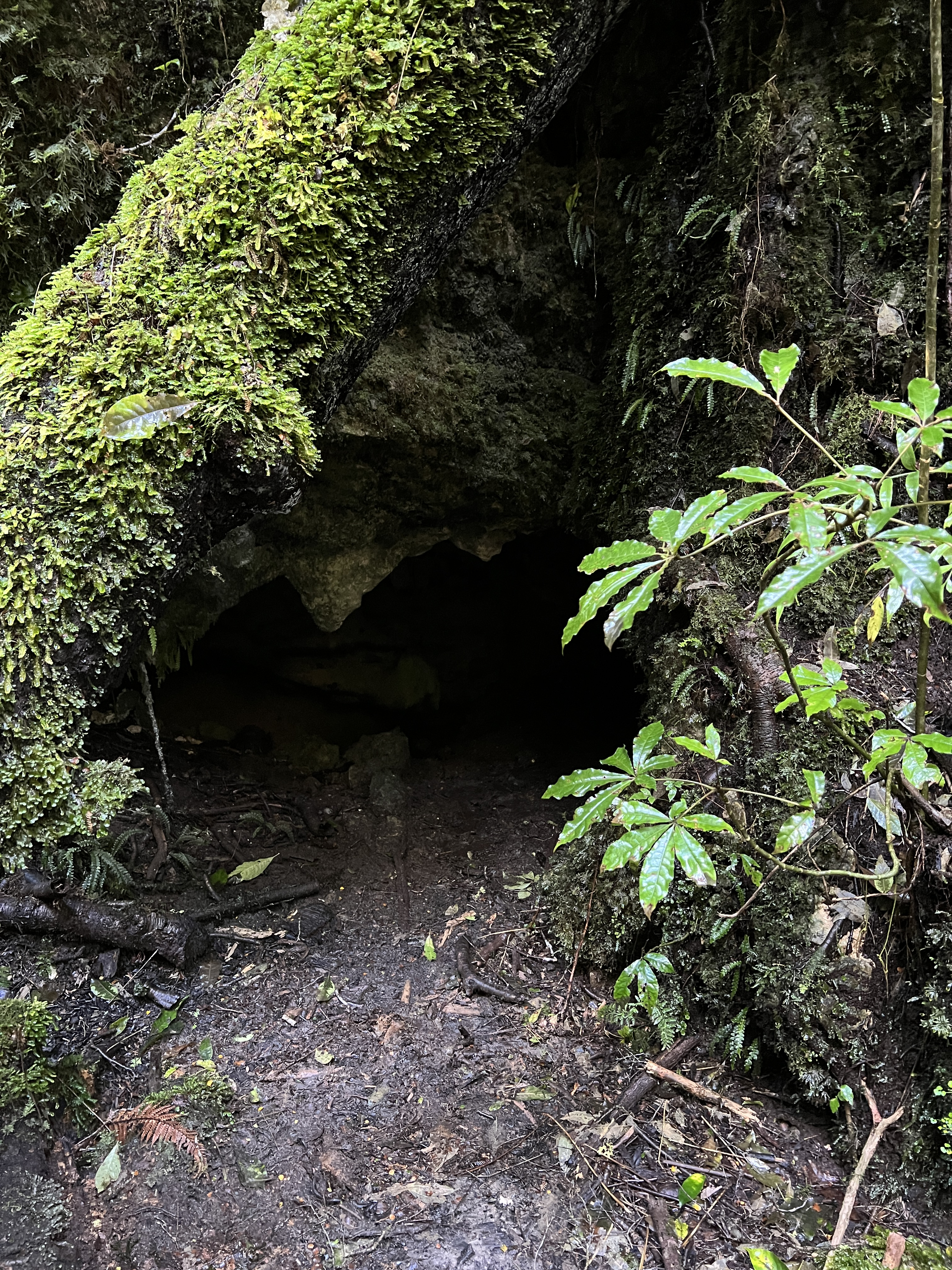
Cavern Creek Cave

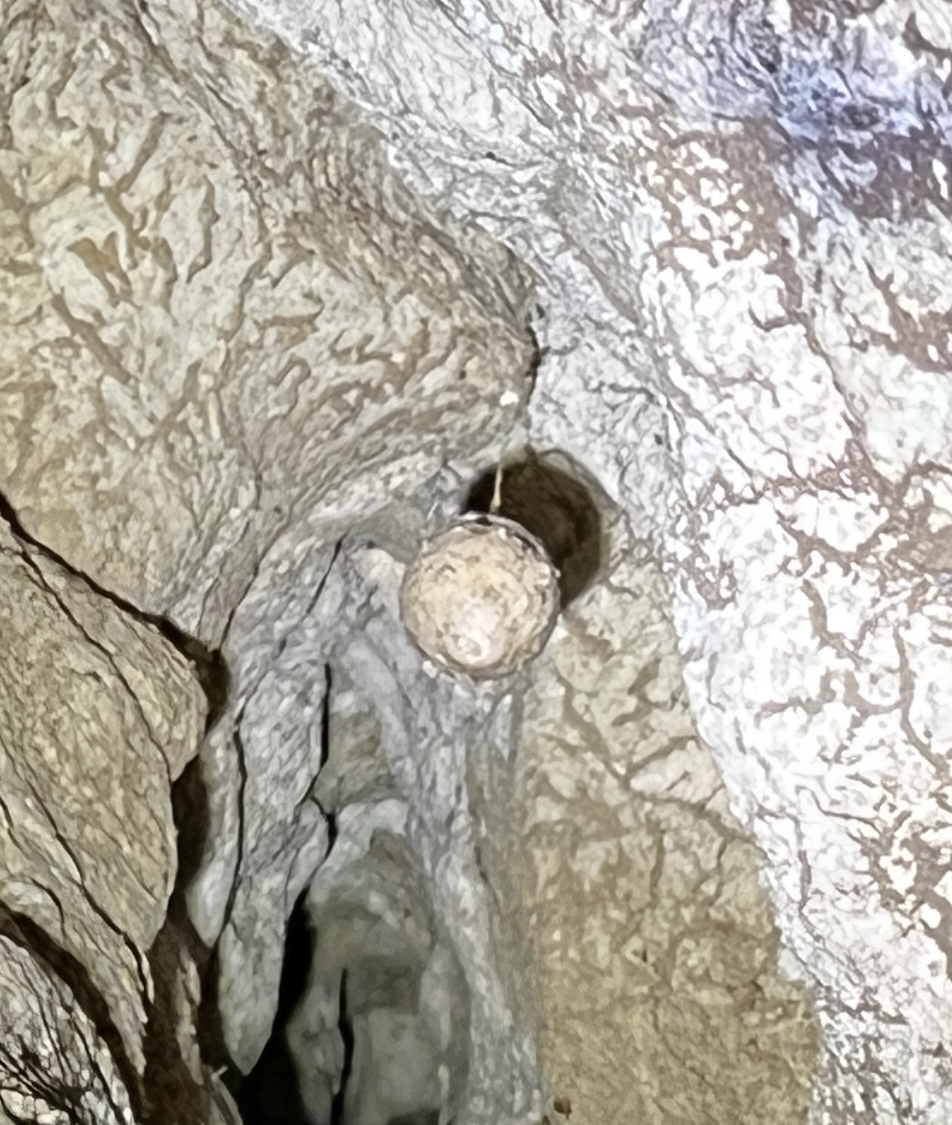
Spelungula egg sac in Cavern Creek Cave

The Fenian Track is graded as a 'walking track', but the Fenian Caves Loop Track is more rugged and is graded as a "tramping track"—it is more rugged and the path is only indicated by orange track markers, while the caves have low passages and require a little climbing. The return trip to Fenian Creek including the Caves Loop takes about four hours.
