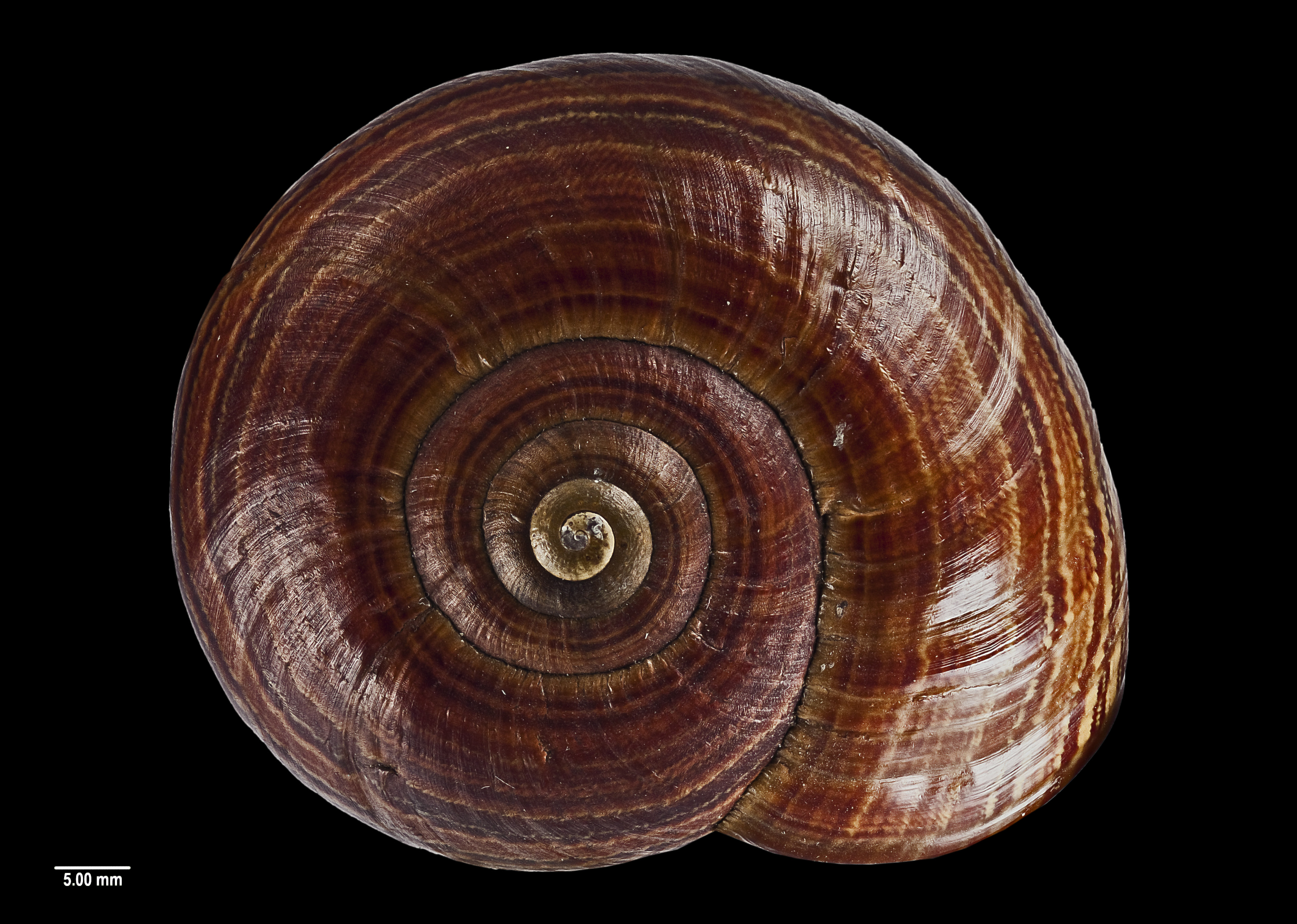
- Type specimen from the collections of Auckland War Memorial Museum

Scientific classification
- Kingdom: Animalia
- Phylum: Mollusca
- Class: Gastropoda
- Order: Stylommatophora
- Family: Rhytididae
- Genus: Powelliphanta
- Species: P. hochstetteri
- Subspecies: P. h. anatokiensis

Trinomial name
- Powelliphanta hochstetteri anatokiensis Powell, 1938

= Powelliphanta hochstetteri anatokiensis =

Subspecies of gastropod

Powelliphanta hochstetteri anatokiensis, known as one of the amber snails, is a subspecies of large, carnivorous land snail, a terrestrial pulmonate gastropod mollusc in the family Rhytididae. It is found in New Zealand.

== Conservation status ==
Powelliphanta hochstetteri anatokiensis is classified by the New Zealand Department of Conservation as being in Gradual Decline.

== Distribution ==
- New Zealand

== Life cycle ==
Shape of the eggs is oval and seldom constant in dimensions 9.5 by 7 millimetres (0.37 in × 0.28 in), 8.5 by 6 millimetres (0.33 in × 0.24 in), 12 by 10.5 millimetres (0.47 in × 0.41 in), 12 by 10 millimetres (0.47 in × 0.39 in), 12.5 by 10.5 millimetres (0.49 in × 0.41 in).
