= Lodestone (disambiguation) =

A lodestone is a naturally magnetized piece of the mineral magnetite.

Lodestone may also refer to:

== Ships ==
- RMAS Lodestone (A115), a former degaussing vessel of the Royal Navy
- USS Lodestone (ADG-8), a former degaussing vessel of the United States Navy

== Comics and games ==
- Lodestone, an alias of DC Comics character Rhea Jones
- Lodestone, a video game developed by Big Robot
- Lodestone Comics, a sister company to Deluxe Comics
- The Lodestone, an official website of Final Fantasy XIV
- Lodestone Games, a game development studio based in Charlottesville, Virginia

== Other ==
- Lodestone (New Zealand), a prominent peak in the Wharepapa / Arthur Range
- Powelliphanta "Lodestone", a species of land snail
- Lodestone Management Consultants, a consulting company based in Switzerland
- Lodestone Theatre Ensemble, a theatre organization based in Los Angeles
