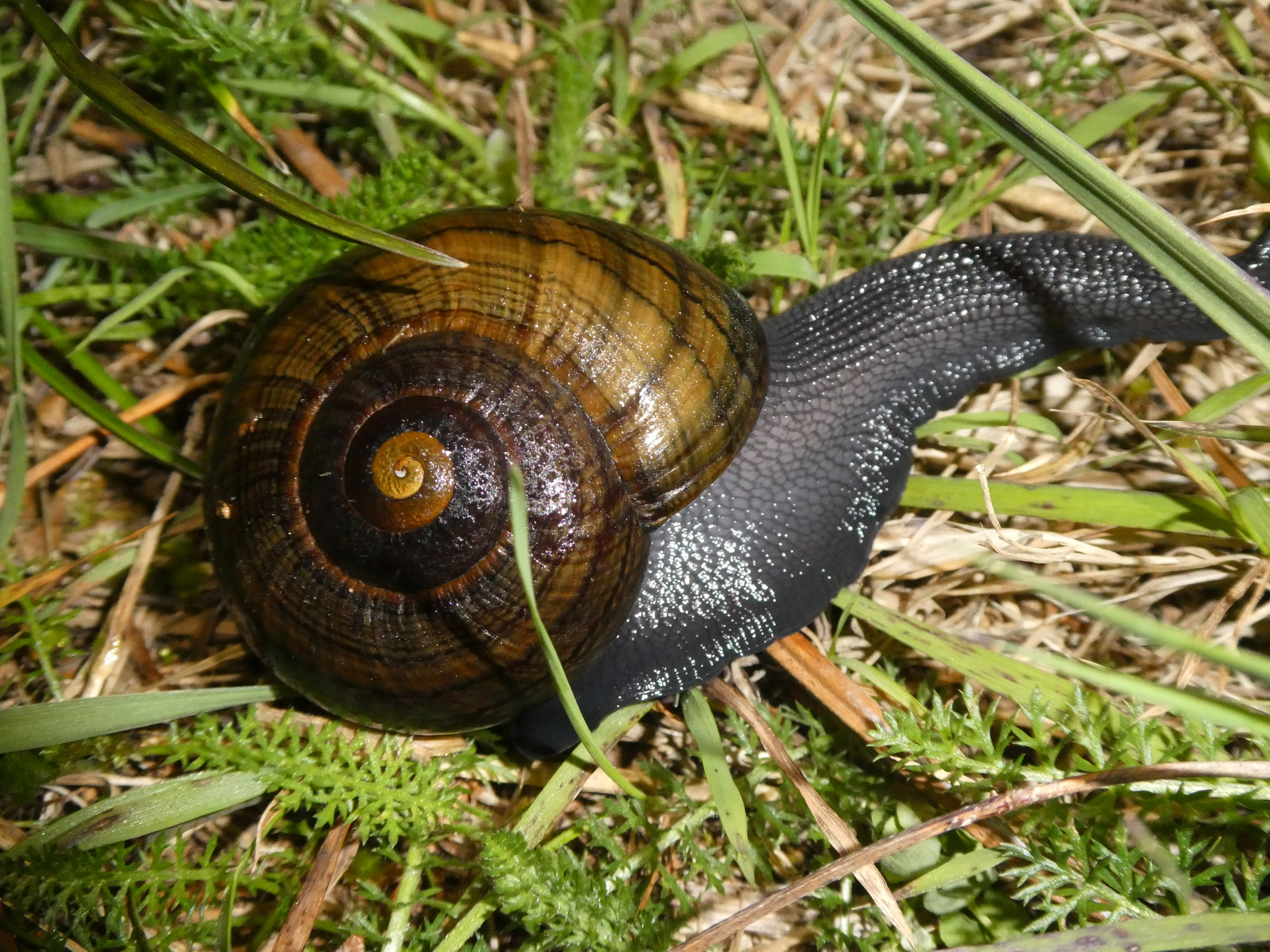
- Powelliphanta hochstetteri subsp. obscura seen in the Marlborough District, New Zealand

Scientific classification
- Kingdom: Animalia
- Phylum: Mollusca
- Class: Gastropoda
- Order: Stylommatophora
- Family: Rhytididae
- Genus: Powelliphanta
- Species: P. hochstetteri
- Subspecies: P. h. obscura

Trinomial name
- Powelliphanta hochstetteri obscura (Beutler, 1901)

= Powelliphanta hochstetteri obscura =

Subspecies of gastropod

Powelliphanta hochstetteri obscura, known as one of the amber snails, is a subspecies of large, carnivorous land snail, a terrestrial pulmonate gastropod mollusc in the family Rhytididae.

== Distribution ==
- New Zealand

== Life cycle ==
Shape of the eggs is oval and seldom constant in dimensions 10 × 8, 11 × 9, 10 × 8, 9.25 × 7.75, 10 × 8.5, 9.75 × 8.25, 9.5 × 7.75 mm.

== Conservation status ==
Powelliphanta hochstetteri obscura is classified by the New Zealand Department of Conservation as being in Gradual Decline.
