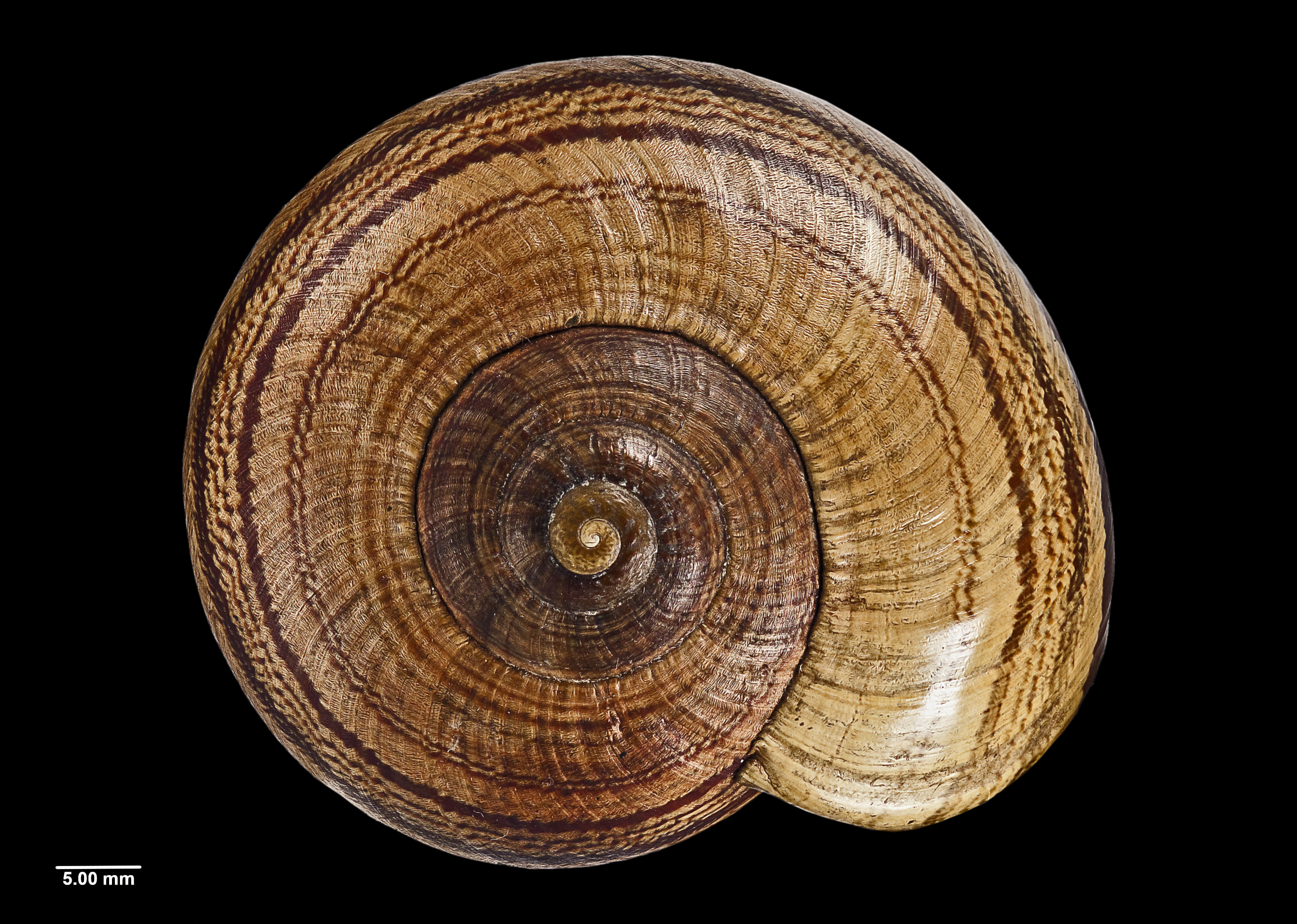
- Type specimen from the collections of Auckland War Memorial Museum

Scientific classification
- Kingdom: Animalia
- Phylum: Mollusca
- Class: Gastropoda
- Order: Stylommatophora
- Family: Rhytididae
- Genus: Powelliphanta
- Species: P. hochstetteri
- Subspecies: P. h. consobrina

Trinomial name
- Powelliphanta hochstetteri consobrina Powell, 1936

= Powelliphanta hochstetteri consobrina =

Subspecies of gastropod

Powelliphanta hochstetteri consobrina, known as one of the amber snails, is a subspecies of large, carnivorous land snail, a terrestrial pulmonate gastropod mollusc in the family Rhytididae.

== Distribution ==
- New Zealand

== Life cycle ==
Shape of the eggs is oval and seldom constant in dimensions 9 × 7.75, 8.25 × 6.75 mm (red variety).

== Conservation status ==
Powelliphanta hochstetteri consobrina is classified by the New Zealand Department of Conservation as being 'Threatened - Nationally Critical'.
