= P. superba =

P. superba may refer to:

- Pangio superba, a ray-finned fish species
- Powelliphanta superba, a land snail species endemic to New Zealand

== See also ==
- Superba (disambiguation)
