= Powelliphanta "Egmont" =

Conservation status
- Range Restricted (NZ TCS)

Scientific classification
- Kingdom: Animalia
- Phylum: Mollusca
- Class: Gastropoda
- Order: Stylommatophora
- Family: Rhytididae
- Genus: Powelliphanta
- Species: P. "Egmont"

Binomial name
- Powelliphanta "Egmont"

Species of gastropod

This is an as-yet-unnamed Powelliphanta species, provisionally known as Powelliphanta "Egmont". It is one of the amber snails, an undescribed species of large, carnivorous land snail, a terrestrial pulmonate gastropod mollusc in the family Rhytididae.

== Conservation status ==
Powelliphanta "Egmont" is classified as Range Restricted by the New Zealand Threat Classification System.
