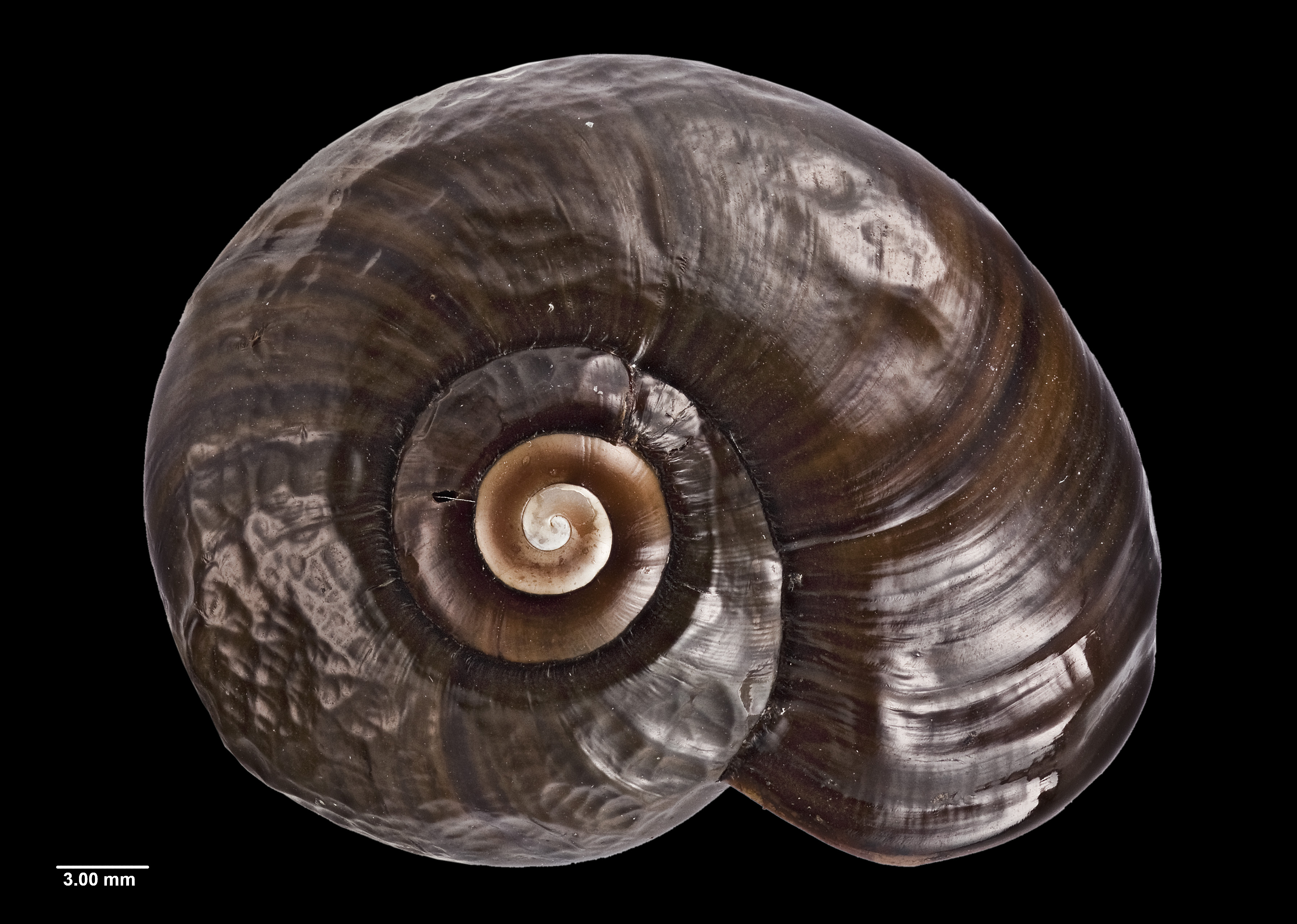

Conservation status
- Data Deficient (IUCN 2.3)

- Data Deficit (NZ TCS)

Scientific classification
- Kingdom: Animalia
- Phylum: Mollusca
- Class: Gastropoda
- Order: Stylommatophora
- Family: Rhytididae
- Genus: Powelliphanta
- Species: P. rossiana

Binomial name
- Powelliphanta rossiana Powell, 1930

= Powelliphanta rossiana =

Species of gastropod

Powelliphanta rossiana, known as Ross' land snail, is a species of large, carnivorous land snail, a terrestrial pulmonate gastropod mollusc in the family Rhytididae. This species is endemic to the South Island of New Zealand. Subspecies include:

- Powelliphanta rossiana fletcheri Powell, 1938 – Range Restricted
- Powelliphanta rossiana, subspecies "Fox"
- Powelliphanta rossiana gagei Powell, 1938 – Nationally Critical
- Powelliphanta rossiana rossiana Powell, 1930

The eggs are oval and seldom constant in dimensions 8 × 6.75, 6.5 × 5.75, 8.25 × 6.75 mm.
