= Powelliphanta "Anatoki Range" =

Conservation status
- Nationally Critical (NZ TCS)

Scientific classification
- Kingdom: Animalia
- Phylum: Mollusca
- Class: Gastropoda
- Order: Stylommatophora
- Family: Rhytididae
- Genus: Powelliphanta
- Species: P. "Anatoki Range"

Binomial name
- Powelliphanta "Anatoki Range"

Species of Gastropod

An as-yet-unnamed Powelliphanta species is provisionally known as Powelliphanta "Anatoki Range". It is one of the amber snails. It is an undescribed species of large, carnivorous land snail, a terrestrial pulmonate gastropod mollusc in the family Rhytididae.

== Conservation status ==
Powelliphanta "Anatoki Range" is classified as Nationally Critical by the New Zealand Threat Classification System.
