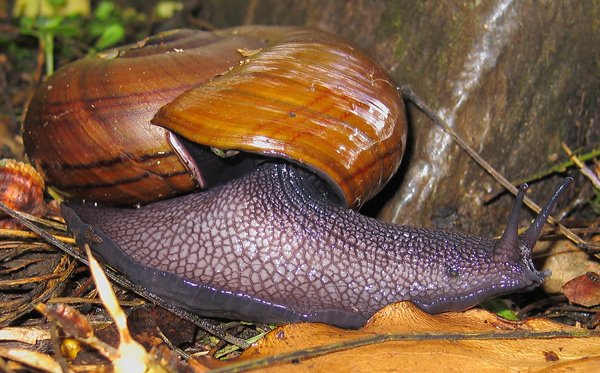
- Powelliphanta hochstetteri, Rameka Track, Golden Bay

Scientific classification
- Kingdom: Animalia
- Phylum: Mollusca
- Class: Gastropoda
- Order: Stylommatophora
- Family: Rhytididae
- Genus: Powelliphanta
- Species: P. hochstetteri

Binomial name
- Powelliphanta hochstetteri (Pfeiffer, 1862)

Synonyms
- Helix Hochstetteri Pfeiffer, 1862

= Powelliphanta hochstetteri =

Species of land snail

Powelliphanta hochstetteri, known as one of the amber snails, is a species of large, carnivorous land snail, a terrestrial pulmonate gastropod mollusc in the family Rhytididae.

== Distribution ==
This species is endemic to the Marlborough and Nelson provinces of the South Island of New Zealand. There are five subspecies:

- Powelliphanta hochstetteri anatokiensis Powell, 1938
- Powelliphanta hochstetteri bicolor Powell, 1930
- Powelliphanta hochstetteri consobrina Powell, 1936
- Powelliphanta hochstetteri hochstetteri (Pfeiffer, 1862)
- Powelliphanta hochstetteri obscura Beutler, 1901

== Description ==
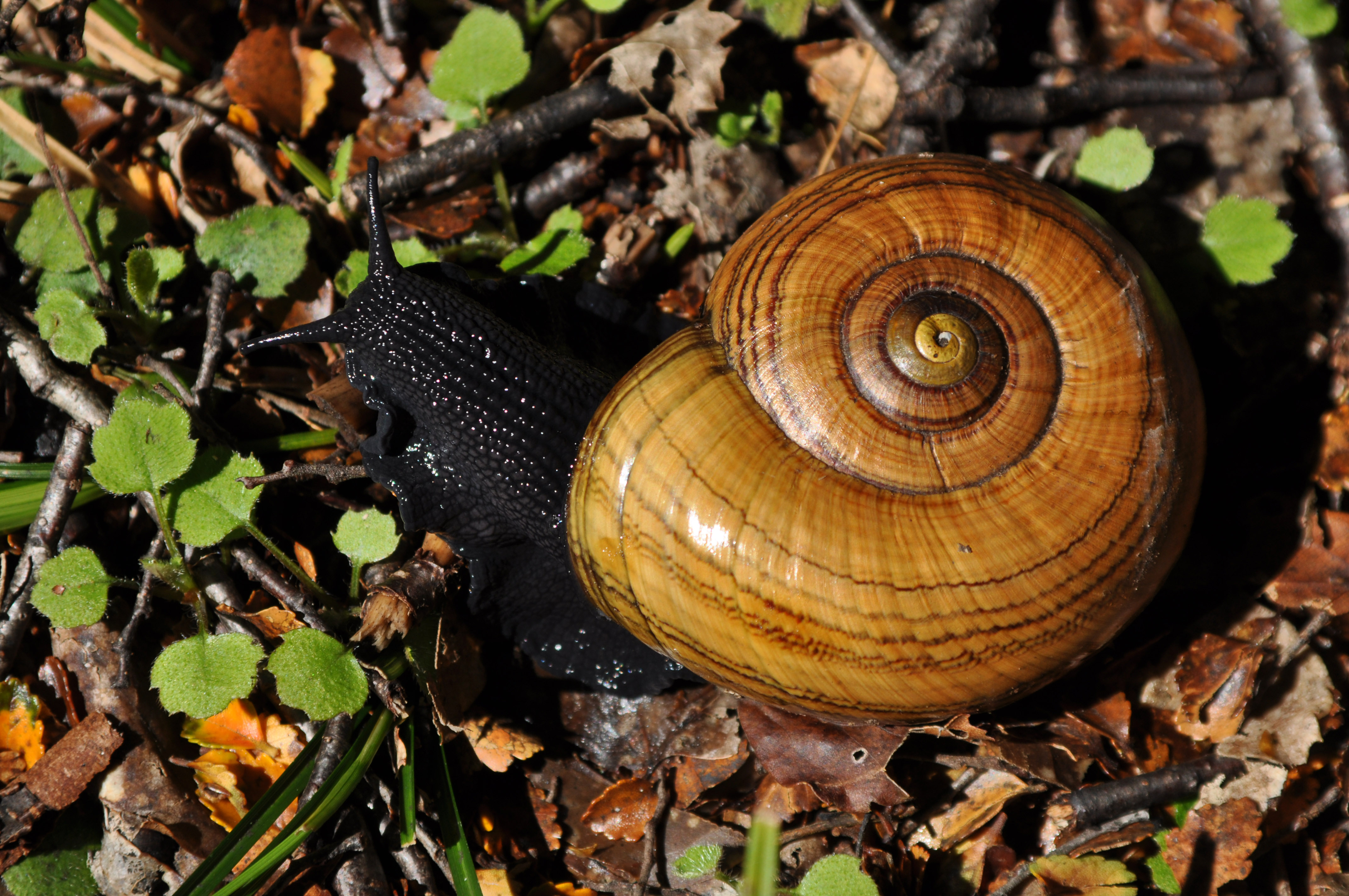

Powelliphanta hochstetteri was originally described under the name Helix hochstetteri by German malacologist Ludwig Karl Georg Pfeiffer in 1862. He described it according to the shell only, which geologist German Ferdinand von Hochstetter had brought from the New Zealand. The specific name hochstetteri is in honor of Ferdinand von Hochstetter.

== Life cycle ==
The shape of the eggs is oval and they are seldom constant in dimensions: 12 by 10 millimetres (0.47 in × 0.39 in).
