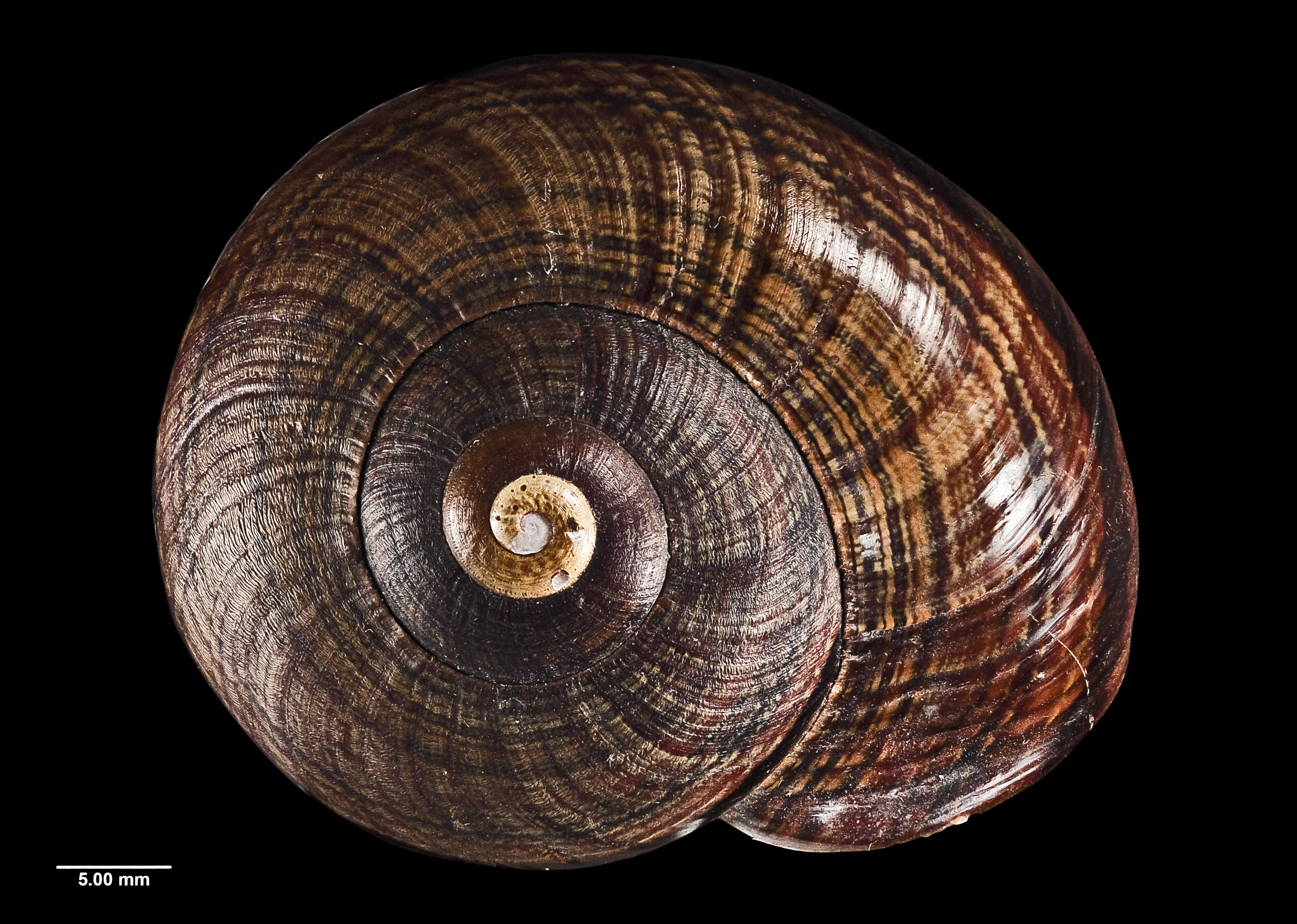
- Holotype of Powelliphanta gilliesi fallax from the Auckland War Memorial Museum

Conservation status
- Data Deficient (IUCN 2.3)

Scientific classification
- Kingdom: Animalia
- Phylum: Mollusca
- Class: Gastropoda
- Order: Stylommatophora
- Family: Rhytididae
- Genus: Powelliphanta
- Species: P. gilliesi

Binomial name
- Powelliphanta gilliesi E. A. Smith, 1880

Synonyms
- Paryphanta gilliesi Smith, 1880

= Powelliphanta gilliesi =

Species of gastropod

Powelliphanta gilliesi, one of the "amber snails", is a species of large, carnivorous land snail, a terrestrial pulmonate gastropod mollusc in the family Rhytididae.

== Distribution ==
This species is endemic to the West Nelson area of the South Island of New Zealand.

There are nine subspecies, some of which are listed by the New Zealand Department of Conservation:

- Powelliphanta gilliesi aurea Powell, 1946
- Powelliphanta gilliesi brunnea Powell, 1938
- Powelliphanta gilliesi compta Powell, 1930 – Nationally Vulnerable
- Powelliphanta gilliesi fallax Powell, 1930 – National Decline
- Powelliphanta gilliesi gilliesi Smith, 1880
- Powelliphanta gilliesi jamesoni Powell, 1936
- Powelliphanta gilliesi kahurangica Powell, 1936
- Powelliphanta gilliesi montana Powell, 1936
- Powelliphanta gilliesi subfusca Powell, 1930 – Gradual Decline

== Life cycle ==
The eggs of this species are oval in shape and are rarely constant in dimensions, varying from 9 by 8 millimetres (0.35 in × 0.31 in), to 9.75 by 8 millimetres (0.384 in × 0.315 in), and 10 by 8 millimetres (0.39 in × 0.31 in).
