= Powelliphanta "Haast" =

Conservation status
- Range Restricted (NZ TCS)

Scientific classification
- Kingdom: Animalia
- Phylum: Mollusca
- Class: Gastropoda
- Order: Stylommatophora
- Family: Rhytididae
- Genus: Powelliphanta
- Species: P. "Haast"

Binomial name
- Powelliphanta "Haast"

Species of gastropod

This yet-unnamed Powelliphanta species, provisionally known as Powelliphanta "Haast", is one of the amber snails which is an undescribed species of large, carnivorous land snail, a terrestrial pulmonate gastropod mollusc in the family Rhytididae.

== Conservation status ==
Powelliphanta "Haast" is classified as being Range restricted by the New Zealand Threat Classification System.
