= Powelliphanta "Urewera" =

Conservation status
- Serious Decline (NZ TCS)

Scientific classification
- Kingdom: Animalia
- Phylum: Mollusca
- Class: Gastropoda
- Order: Stylommatophora
- Family: Rhytididae
- Genus: Powelliphanta
- Species: P. "Urewera"

Binomial name
- Powelliphanta "Urewera"

Species of gastropod

The yet-unnamed Powelliphanta species of amber snails is provisionally known as Powelliphanta "Urewera". It is an undescribed species of large, carnivorous land snail, a terrestrial pulmonate gastropod mollusc in the family Rhytididae.

== Conservation status ==
Powelliphanta "Urewera" is classified in the New Zealand Threat Classification System as being in Serious Decline.
