= Powelliphanta "Kirwans" =

Conservation status
- Range Restricted (NZ TCS)

Scientific classification
- Kingdom: Animalia
- Phylum: Mollusca
- Class: Gastropoda
- Order: Stylommatophora
- Family: Rhytididae
- Genus: Powelliphanta
- Species: P. "Kirwans"

Binomial name
- Powelliphanta "Kirwans"

Species of gastropod

This is a yet-unnamed Powelliphanta species, provisionally known as Powelliphanta "Kirwans". It is one of the amber snails and is an undescribed species of large, carnivorous land snail, a terrestrial pulmonate gastropod mollusc in the family Rhytididae.

== Conservation status ==
Powelliphanta "Kirwans"is classified by the New Zealand Threat Classification System as Range restricted.
