= Powelliphanta fiordlandica =

Conservation status
- Nationally Vulnerable (NZ TCS)

Scientific classification
- Kingdom: Animalia
- Phylum: Mollusca
- Class: Gastropoda
- Order: Stylommatophora
- Family: Rhytididae
- Genus: Powelliphanta
- Species: P. fiordlandica

Binomial name
- Powelliphanta fiordlandica (Climo, 1971)

Synonyms
- Paryphanta (Powelliphanta) fiordlandica Climo, 1971 (superseded combination)

Species of gastropod

Powelliphanta fiordlandica, one of the amber snails, is a species of large, carnivorous land snail, a terrestrial pulmonate gastropod mollusc in the family Rhytididae.

== Description ==
The length of the shell attains 32mm, its height 16mm.

== Distribution ==
This species is endemic to New Zealand and occurs on Resolution Island, South Island.

== Conservation status ==
Under the New Zealand Threat Classification System, this species is listed as nationally vulnerable with the qualifiers of biologically sparse, conservation dependent, data poor: size and data poor: trend.

== Bibliography ==
- Powell A W B, New Zealand Mollusca, William Collins Publishers Ltd, Auckland, New Zealand 1979 ISBN 0-00-216906-1
- Climo, F.M. (1971). "A new species of Paryphanta (Mollusca: Paryphantidae) from south-west Fiordland, New Zealand". Records of the Dominion Museum. 7: 147.
- Spencer, H.G., Marshall, B.A. & Willan, R.C. (2009). Checklist of New Zealand living Mollusca. Pp 196-219. in: Gordon, D.P. (ed.) New Zealand inventory of biodiversity. Volume one. Kingdom Animalia: Radiata, Lophotrochozoa, Deuterostomia. Christchurch: Canterbury University Press.
- Meads, M.J., Walker, K.J., Elliott, G.P. (1984). "Status, conservation, and management of the land snails of the genus Powelliphanta (Mollusca: Pulmonata)". New Zealand Journal of Zoology. 11 (3): 299. doi:10.1080/03014223.1984.10428241.
