= Powelliphanta "Owen" =

Conservation status
- Nationally Endangered (NZ TCS)

Scientific classification
- Kingdom: Animalia
- Phylum: Mollusca
- Class: Gastropoda
- Order: Stylommatophora
- Family: Rhytididae
- Genus: Powelliphanta
- Species: P. "Owen"

Binomial name
- Powelliphanta "Owen"

Species of gastropod

This is a yet-unnamed Powelliphanta species, provisionally known as Powelliphanta "Owen". This is one of the amber snails. It is an undescribed species of large, carnivorous land snail, a terrestrial pulmonate gastropod mollusc in the family Rhytididae.

== Conservation status ==
Powelliphanta "Owen" is classified by the New Zealand Department of Conservation as Nationally Endangered.
