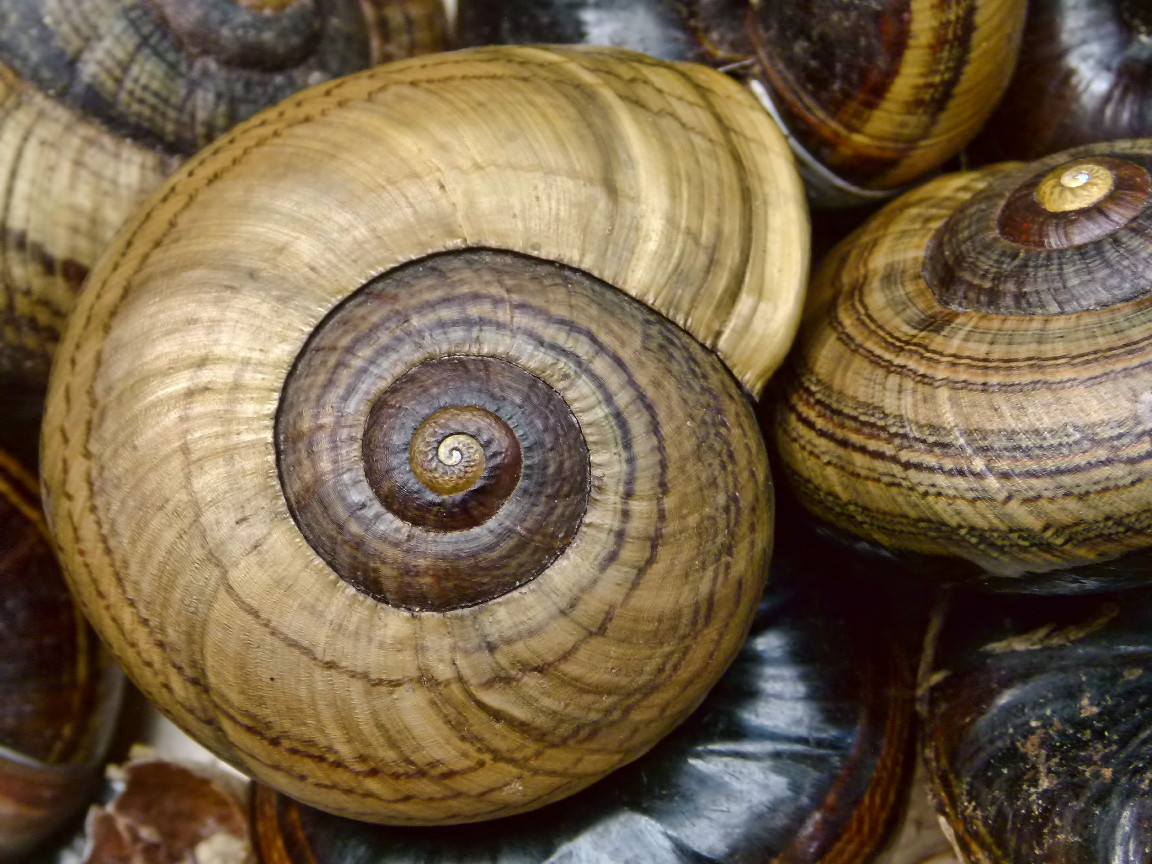
- Photo of apical view of a shell of Powelliphanta hochstetteri bicolor.

Scientific classification
- Kingdom: Animalia
- Phylum: Mollusca
- Class: Gastropoda
- Order: Stylommatophora
- Family: Rhytididae
- Genus: Powelliphanta
- Species: P. hochstetteri
- Subspecies: P. h. bicolor

Trinomial name
- Powelliphanta hochstetteri bicolor Powell, 1938

= Powelliphanta hochstetteri bicolor =

Subspecies of gastropod

Powelliphanta hochstetteri bicolor, known as one of the amber snails, is a subspecies of large, carnivorous land snail, a terrestrial pulmonate gastropod mollusc in the family Rhytididae.

== Distribution ==
This species occurs in New Zealand

== Life cycle ==
The shape of the eggs is oval, and they are usually not constant in their dimensions. On average, they are 10.75 by 9 millimetres (0.423 in × 0.354 in).

== Conservation status ==
Powelliphanta hochstetteri bicolor is classified by the New Zealand Department of Conservation as being in Gradual Decline.
