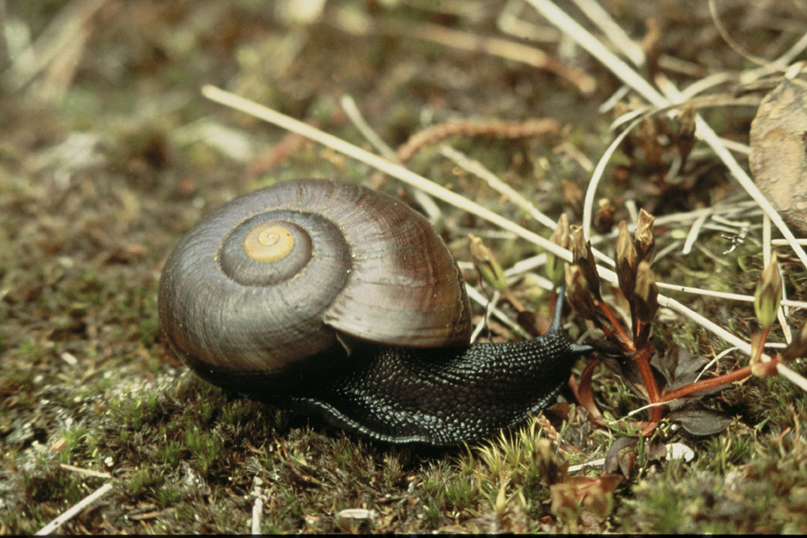

Conservation status
- Near Threatened (IUCN 2.3)

Scientific classification
- Kingdom: Animalia
- Phylum: Mollusca
- Class: Gastropoda
- Order: Stylommatophora
- Family: Rhytididae
- Genus: Powelliphanta
- Species: P. marchanti

Binomial name
- Powelliphanta marchanti (Powell, 1932)

= Powelliphanta marchanti =

Species of gastropod

Powelliphanta marchanti is a species of land snail in the family Rhytididae. It is endemic to New Zealand.

== Conservation status ==
Powelliphanta marchanti is classified by the New Zealand Department of Conservation as a species in "serious decline".
