= Powelliphanta "vittatus" =

Conservation status
- Range Restricted (NZ TCS)

Scientific classification
- Kingdom: Animalia
- Phylum: Mollusca
- Class: Gastropoda
- Order: Stylommatophora
- Family: Rhytididae
- Genus: Powelliphanta
- Species: P. "vittatus"

Binomial name
- Powelliphanta "vittatus"

Species of gastropod

Powelliphanta "vittatus", known as one of the amber snails, is an as yet unnamed species of large, carnivorous land snail, a terrestrial pulmonate gastropod mollusc in the family Rhytididae.

== Conservation status ==
Powelliphanta "vittatus" is classified as Range Restricted by the New Zealand Threat Classification System.
