= Powelliphanta "Matakitaki" =

Conservation status
- Range Restricted (NZ TCS)

Scientific classification
- Kingdom: Animalia
- Phylum: Mollusca
- Class: Gastropoda
- Order: Stylommatophora
- Family: Rhytididae
- Genus: Powelliphanta
- Species: P. "Matakitaki"

Binomial name
- Powelliphanta "Matakitaki"

Species of gastropod

This is a yet-unnamed Powelliphanta species, provisionally referred to as Powelliphanta "Matakitaki". It is one of the amber snails — an undescribed species of large, carnivorous land snail. This terrestrial pulmonate gastropod mollusc belongs to the family Rhytididae.

== Conservation status ==
Powelliphanta "Matakitaki" is classified by the New Zealand Threat Classification System as Range restricted.
