= Powelliphanta "Baton" =

Conservation status
- Nationally Critical (NZ TCS)

Scientific classification
- Kingdom: Animalia
- Phylum: Mollusca
- Class: Gastropoda
- Order: Stylommatophora
- Family: Rhytididae
- Genus: Powelliphanta
- Species: P. "Baton"

Binomial name
- Powelliphanta "Baton"

Species of Gastropoda

An as-yet-unnamed Powelliphanta species is provisionally known as Powelliphanta "Baton". This is one of the amber snails. It is an undescribed species of large, carnivorous land snail, a terrestrial pulmonate gastropod mollusc in the family Rhytididae.

== Conservation status ==
Powelliphanta "Baton" is classified as Nationally Critical by the New Zealand Department of Conservation.
