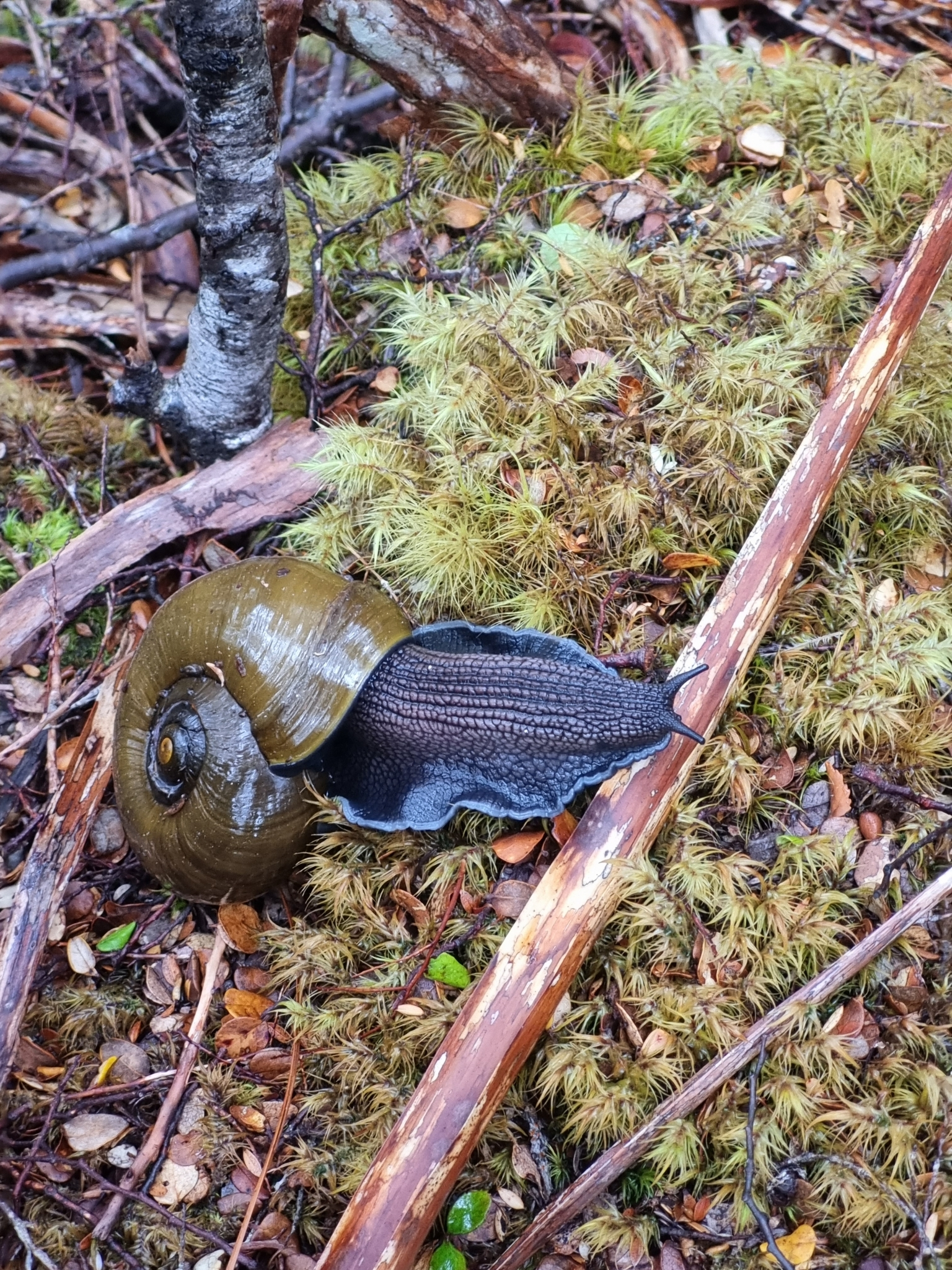
- Powelliphana superba superba in its native habitat

Scientific classification
- Kingdom: Animalia
- Phylum: Mollusca
- Class: Gastropoda
- Order: Stylommatophora
- Family: Rhytididae
- Genus: Powelliphanta
- Species: P. superba

Binomial name
- Powelliphanta superba Powell, 1930

Synonyms
- Paryphanta superba (Powell, 1930)

= Powelliphanta superba =

Species of gastropod

Powelliphanta superba is a species of large, carnivorous land snail in the family Rhytididae, which is endemic to the South Island of New Zealand. Five subspecies are recognised, all of which are classified by the New Zealand Department of Conservation as being Nationally Endangered.

== Taxonomy ==
Powelliphanta superba was originally described as Paryphanta superba by Arthur William Baden Powell in 1930. The paratype specimens are located at Auckland War Memorial Museum.

There are five subspecies of P. superba:

- Powelliphanta superba harveyi
- Powelliphanta superba mouatae
- Powelliphanta superba prouseorum
- Powelliphanta superba richardsoni
- Powelliphanta superba superba

== Description ==
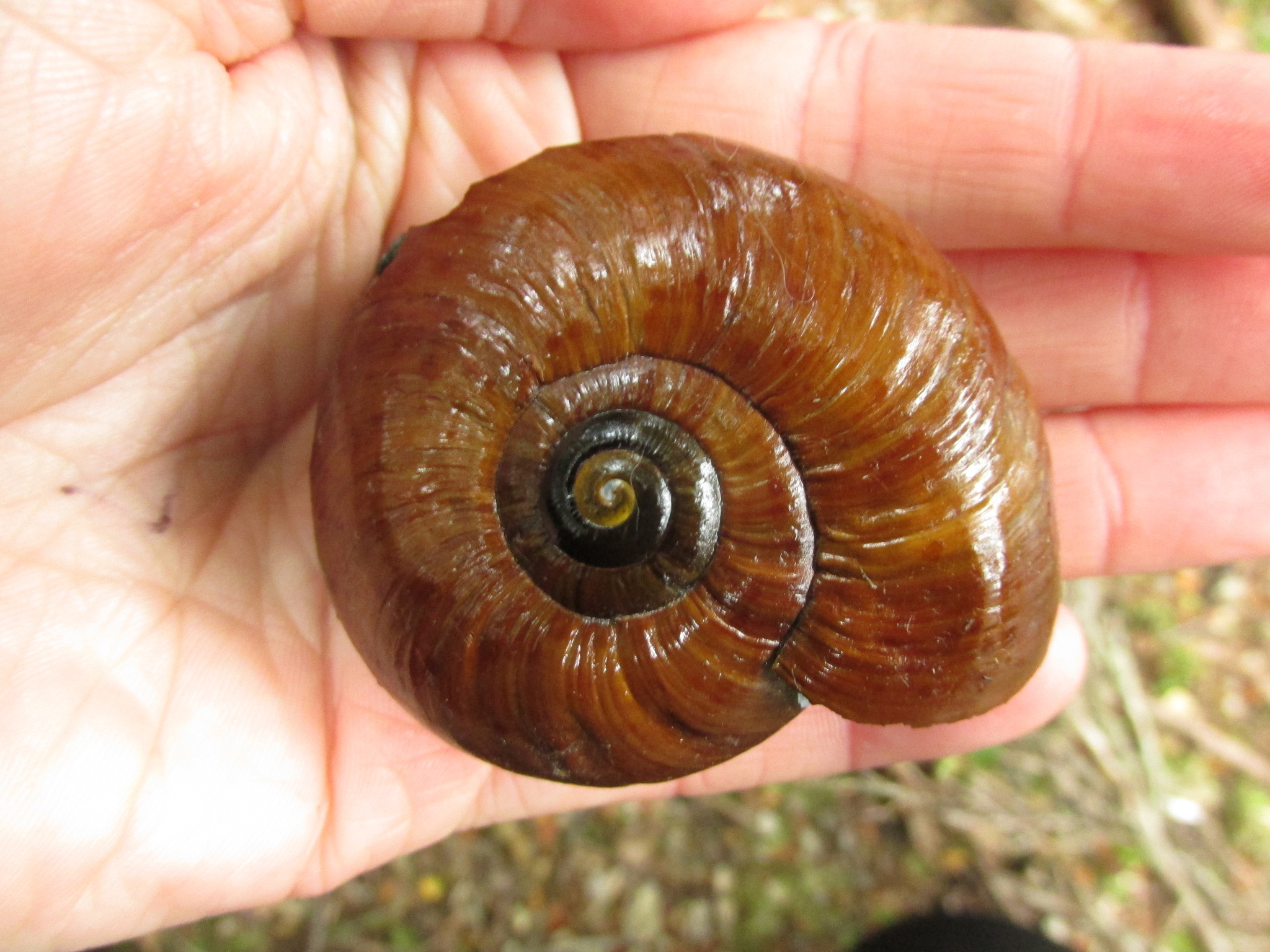
Powelliphanta superba shell

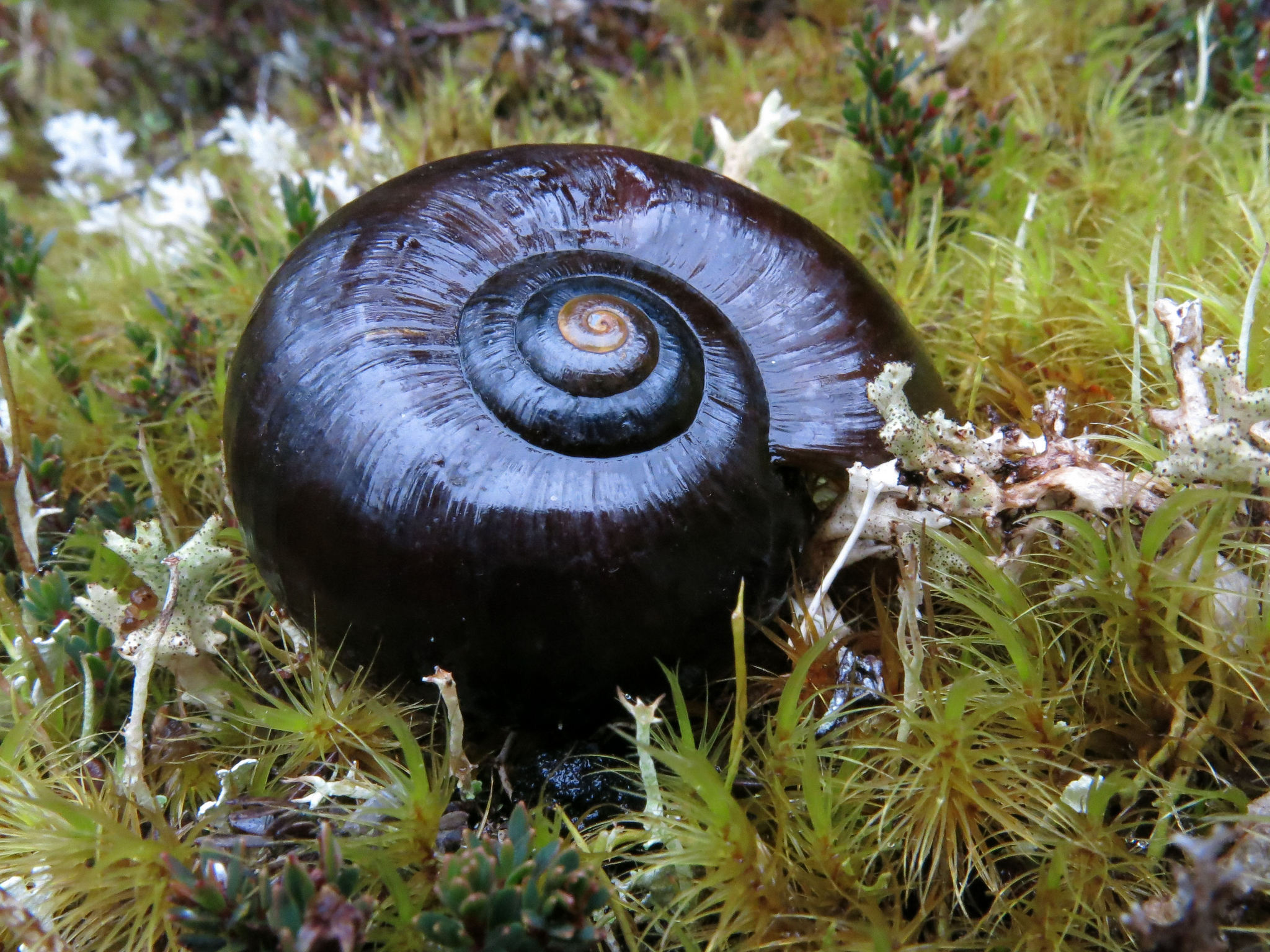
Powelliphanta superba richardsoni shell

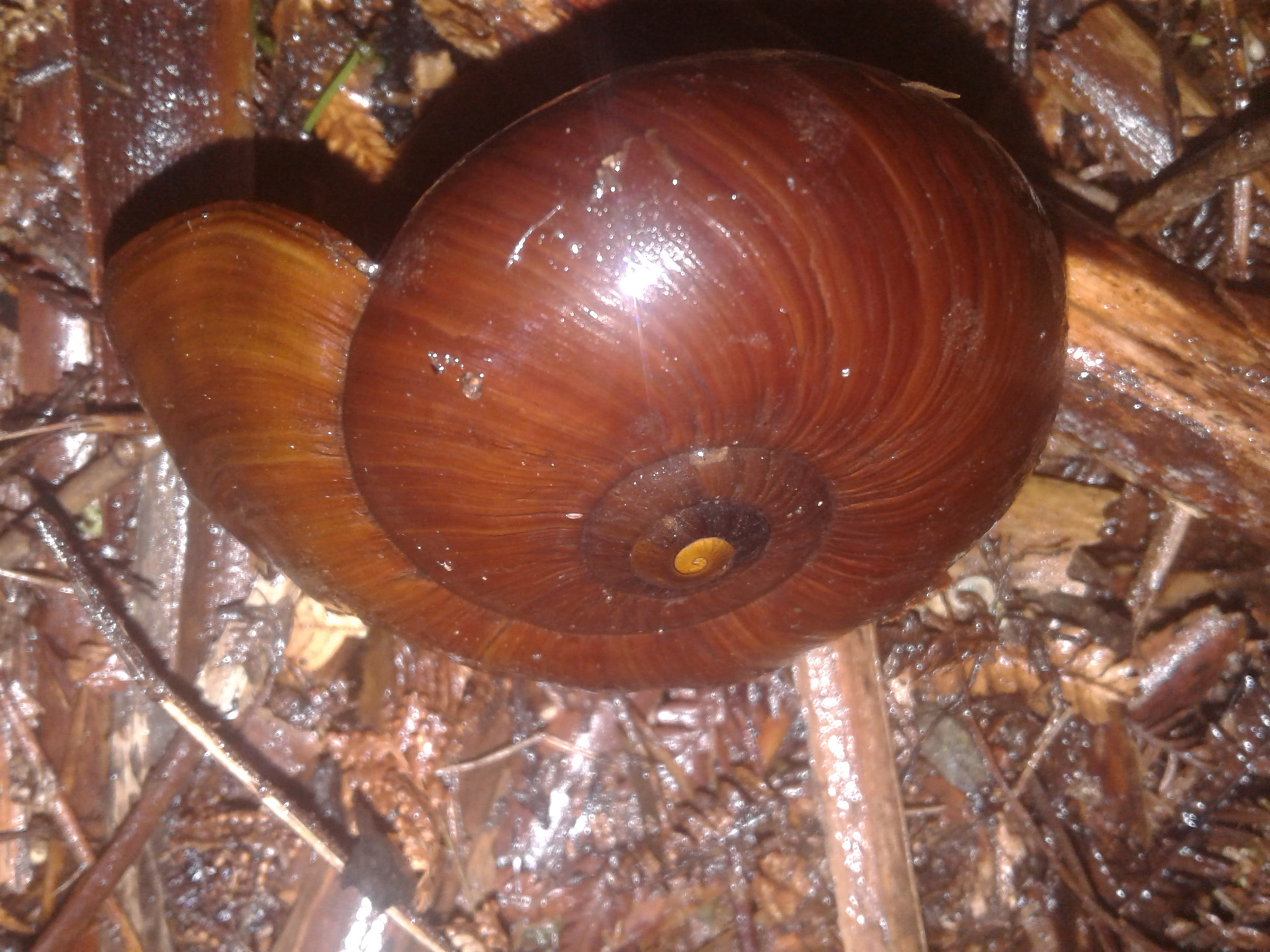
Powelliphanta superba shell

The eggs are oval and seldom constant in dimensions 14 by 12 millimetres (0.55 in × 0.47 in).

== Conservation status ==
Each of the five subspecies are listed as Threatened under the most recent assessment (2007) of the New Zealand Threatened Classification for Powelliphanta. Four are listed as Nationally Endangered, while P. superba superba is listed as Serious Decline.

== See also ==
- List of non-marine molluscs of New Zealand
