= Powelliphanta "Lodestone" =

Conservation status
- Range Restricted (NZ TCS)

Scientific classification
- Kingdom: Animalia
- Phylum: Mollusca
- Class: Gastropoda
- Order: Stylommatophora
- Family: Rhytididae
- Genus: Powelliphanta
- Species: P. "Lodestone"

Binomial name
- Powelliphanta "Lodestone"

Species of gastropod

Powelliphanta "Lodestone" is a provisional name for an as yet undescribed species of large, carnivorous land snail, an "amber snail", a terrestrial pulmonate gastropod mollusc in the family Rhytididae.

== Conservation status ==
Powelliphanta "Lodestone" is classified by the New Zealand Threat Classification System as Range restricted.
