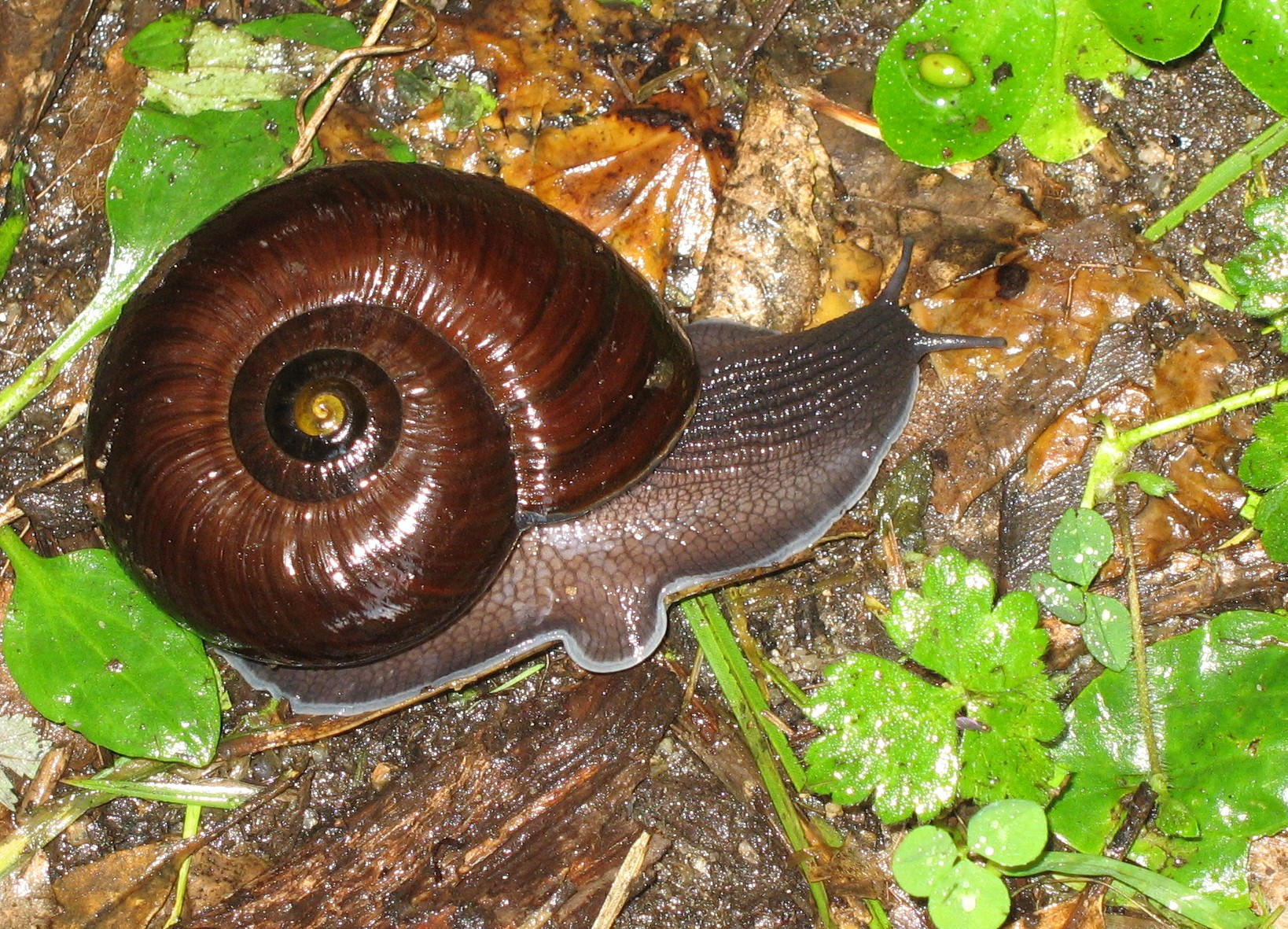
- Powelliphanta annectens

Conservation status
- Nationally Critical (NZ TCS)

Scientific classification
- Kingdom: Animalia
- Phylum: Mollusca
- Class: Gastropoda
- Order: Stylommatophora
- Family: Rhytididae
- Genus: Powelliphanta
- Species: P. annectens

Binomial name
- Powelliphanta annectens Powell, 1936

= Powelliphanta annectens =

Species of gastropod

Powelliphanta annectens is one of the amber snails, an air-breathing land snail, a terrestrial gastropod mollusc in the family Rhytididae. It is a protected species with very limited distribution.

== Distribution ==
This species occurs in the northern parts of the South Island of New Zealand. The only individuals have been found between 2,000 and 2,500 feet (610 and 760 m) from the Ōpārara River near Karamea, to Gunner Downs south of the Heaphy River.

== Life cycle ==
The shape of the eggs of this species is oval. They are seldom constant in dimensions, varying from 9 by 8 millimetres (0.35 in × 0.31 in) to 9 by 8.5 millimetres (0.35 in × 0.33 in).
