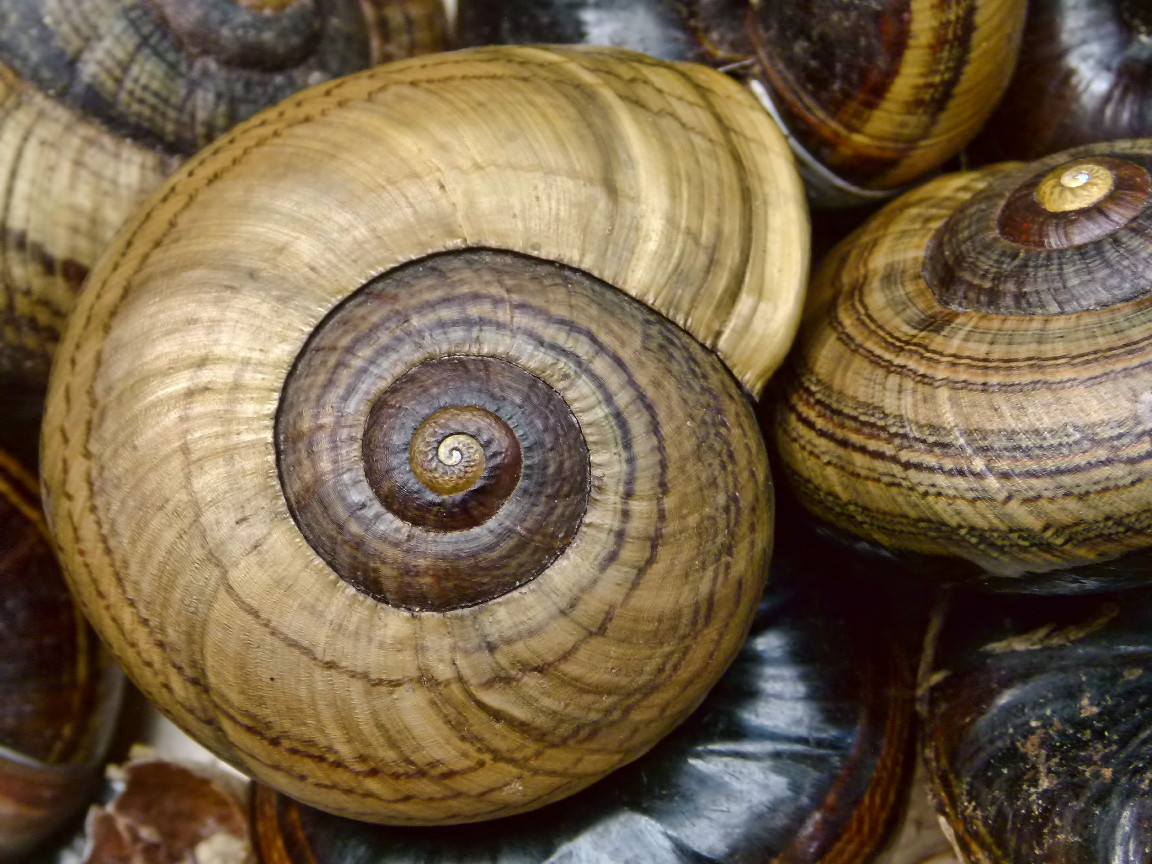
- Shell of Powelliphanta hochstetteri bicolor

Scientific classification
- Kingdom: Animalia
- Phylum: Mollusca
- Class: Gastropoda
- Order: Stylommatophora
- Family: Rhytididae
- Subfamily: Rhytidinae
- Genus: Powelliphanta; O'Connor, 1945

Species
- See text.

= Powelliphanta =

Genus of gastropods

Powelliphanta is a genus of large, air-breathing land snails, pulmonate gastropods in the family Rhytididae, found only in New Zealand. They are carnivorous, eating invertebrates, mostly native earthworms. Often restricted to very small areas of moist forest, they are prey to introduced mammalian predators, and many species are threatened or endangered.

== Taxonomy ==
Powelliphanta was originally described by A. C. O'Connor in 1945 as a subgenus of the kauri snails, Paryphanta. They were named "in recognition of the great service rendered to the study of the family by Mr A. W. B. Powell", and from their similarity to Paryphanta.

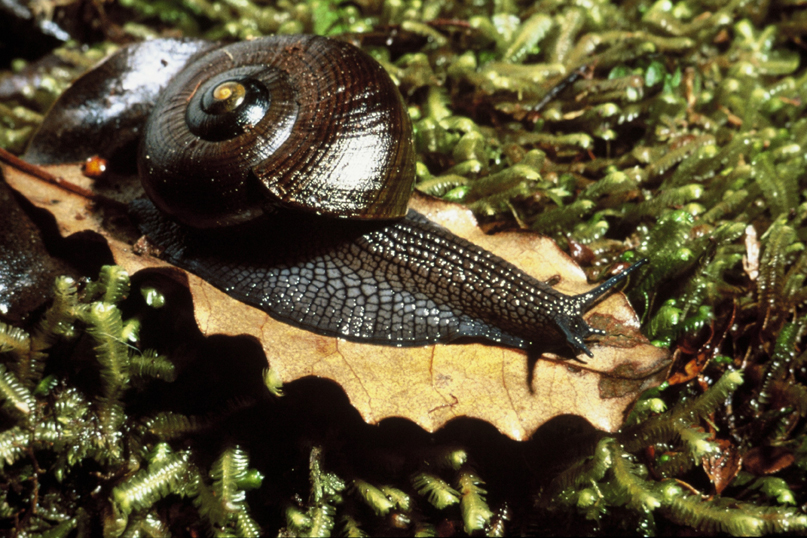
Powelliphanta lignaria johnstoni, Mōkihinui River

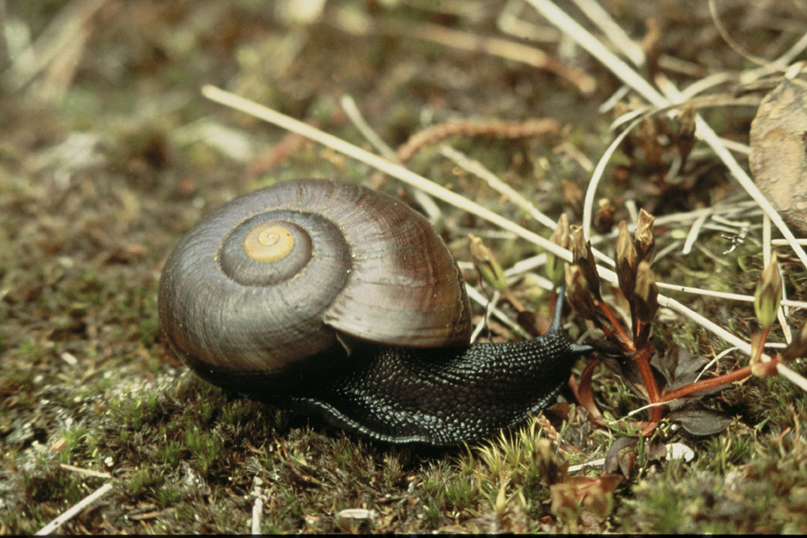
Powelliphanta marchanti

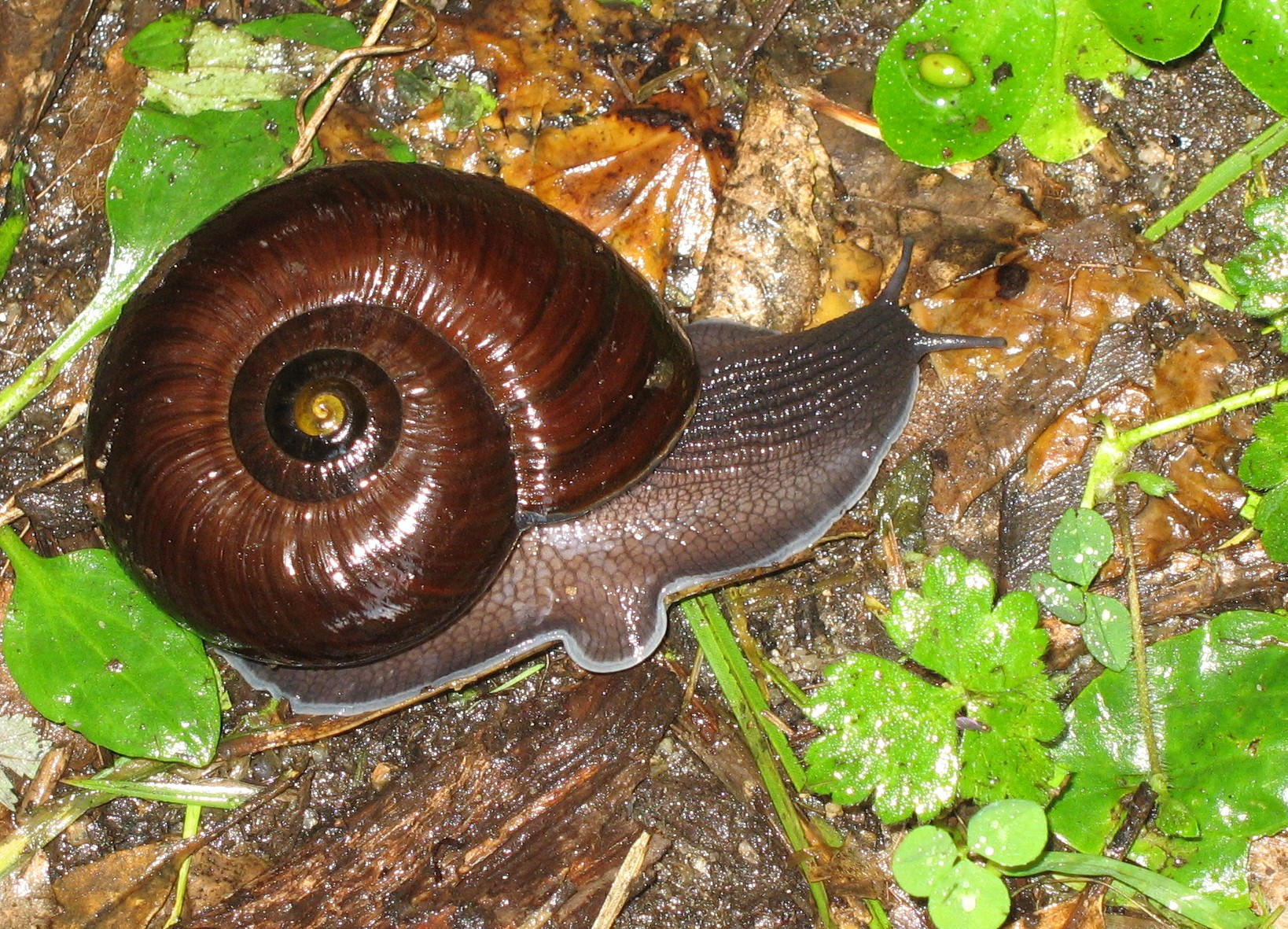
Powelliphanta annectens

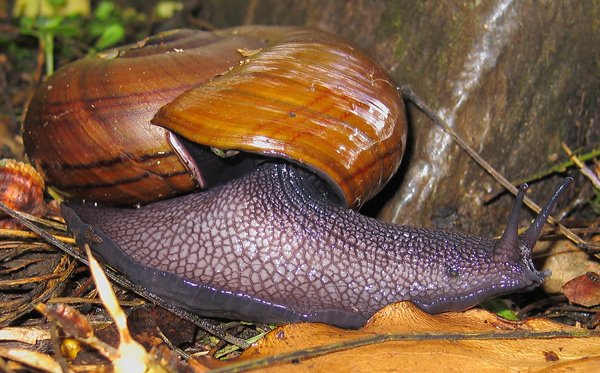
Powelliphanta hochstetteri hochstetteri

Genus PARYPHANTA Albers, 1850.

Sub-genus POWELLIPHANTA nov.

Shell generally, similar to Paryphanta Albers, but with the last whorl pulled in closer to the preceding whorl, and with a colour pattern of concentric or radially arranged bands, usually of alternating and contrasting colours. More important is the paucity of lime compared with conchin in the shell.

Egg always with cuticle, pale buff when laid.

Distribution: North Island of New Zealand, in and south of the Ruahine Range (possibly once as far north as East Cape) and South Island.

Type: Helix hochstetteri Pfeiffer, Mal. Bl., viii, 146, 1862 (see PI. 6, Figs. 5–8).

Powelliphanta will include all New Zealand species previously included in Paryphanta except the type of that genus, P. busbyi (Gray, 1840) which is confined to the North Auckland Peninsula.

In 1977 Climo raised Powelliphanta to genus rank, retaining just two species in Paryphanta. There are at least 21 species and 51 subspecies within the genus. The relationship between the species is complex, and it has been suggested that the group Powelliphanta gilliesi-traversi-hochstetteri-rossiana-lignaria-superba forms a ring species.

== Distribution ==
Powelliphanta are endemic to New Zealand, ranging in the North Island from Lake Waikaremoana to the Kāpiti Coast, and in the South Island from the Marlborough Sounds to Fiordland and Southland. Their greatest diversity is in the mountains of northwest Nelson and north Westland. Some species have an extremely restricted distribution, such as Powelliphanta gilliesi brunnea, which is only found in a 1 hectare (2.5 acres) remnant of coastal forest.

== Habitat ==
These snails live mostly in moist native forest. Some live in lowland forest, such as P. traversi traversi, which is nationally endangered and has its own 10 ha reserve of kahikatea forest and raupo swamp near Levin. Other species live in upland forest, or even under tussock grasses above the treeline. Several species only inhabit forests on limestone soils; they require calcium to build their shells and eggs, and this is obtained from eating invertebrates (including other snails) which have taken up calcium from the limestone environment. Powelliphanta require a moist environment because, unlike other land snails, they cannot seal off their shells with a protective mucous membrane.

== Description ==
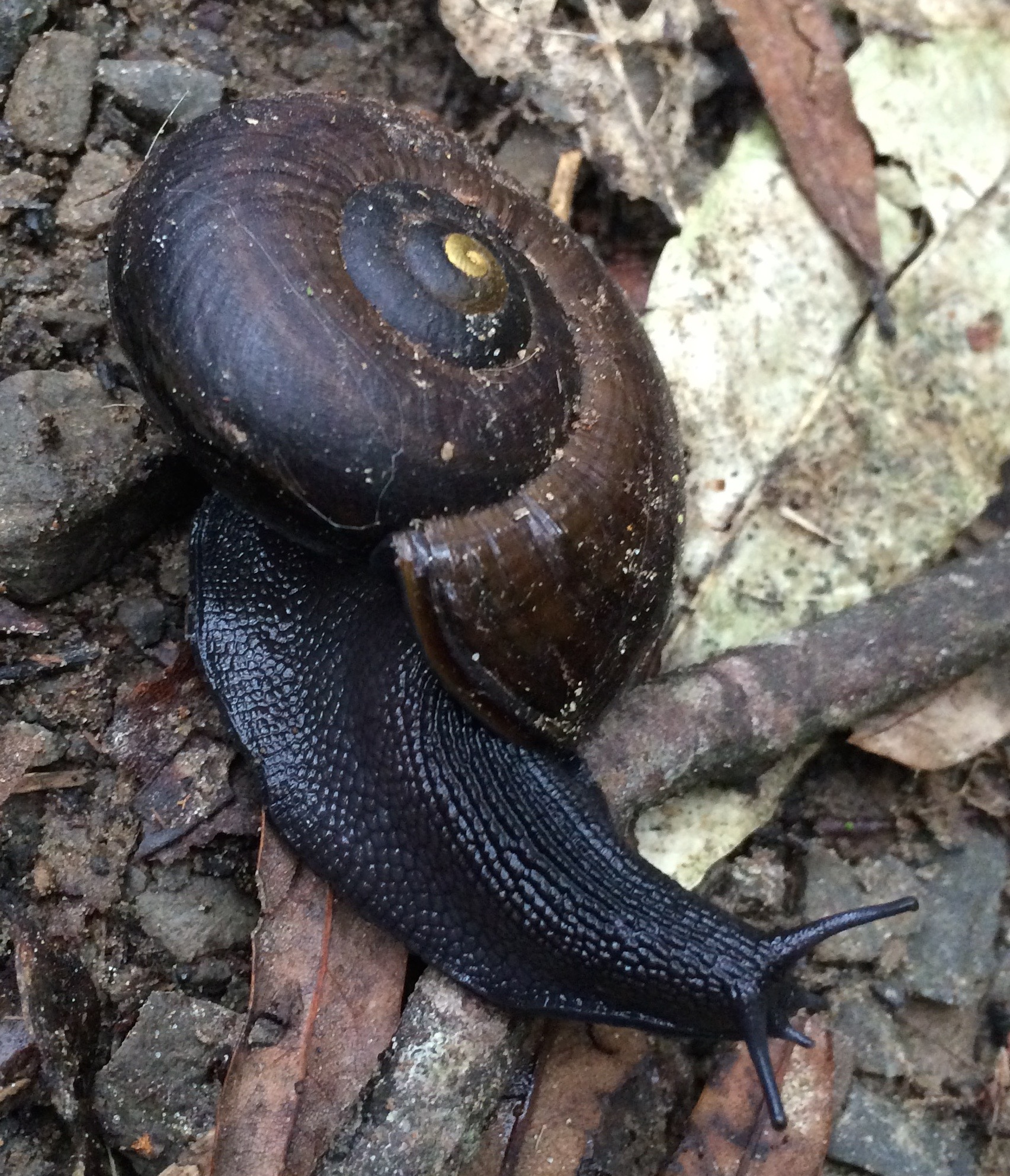
Powelliphanta traversi traversi at Lake Papaitonga

The largest species, Powelliphanta superba prouseorum, has a shell up to 9 centimetres (3.5 in) across and can weigh 90 grams (3.2 oz). The striking delicately patterned shells of Powelliphanta come in an array of shades, from brown or red to yellow or black. The structure of these shells is very delicate, with a very thin layer of calcium carbonate, covered by a thicker chitinous outer layer. These snails need moist surroundings, otherwise the outer layer (periostracum) dries, shrinks and cracks; this sometimes happens in museum shells of this genus which have been stored dry.

== Life habits ==
External videos
- Snail Attack (Powelliphanta feeding)

Powelliphanta are carnivorous, eating mostly earthworms or slugs. They are nocturnal, and during the day live buried under leaf litter and logs. Powelliphanta uses a rudimentary radula to devour their prey: a tongue-like belt of teeth, which scrapes chunks of flesh into the oesophagus. Far from being swallowed whole, prey are subjected to prolonged radulation.

Powelliphanta can live for 20 years or more, and are slow to mature, reaching sexual maturity around 5–6 years of age. They are hermaphrodites, having both male and female sex organs. They lay 5 to 10 large (bean-sized) eggs a year, which have a thin pink calcium carbonate shell, like a tiny bird's egg. Eggs take 2–6 months to hatch in lowland species, 12–14 months for high-altitude species.

== Fossil record ==
Originating more than 235 million years on the supercontinent Gondwana, these snails have been isolated in New Zealand since it separated from Australia about 80 million years ago, and have evolved into numerous distinct species.

== Conservation status ==
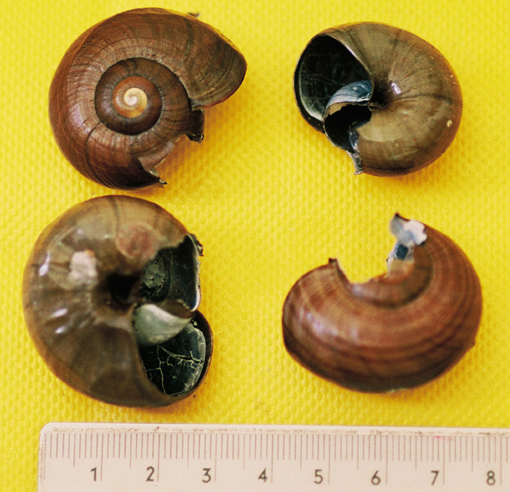
Possum-preyed Powelliphanta traversi snail shells.

Most of these snails are under serious threat or even in danger of extinction. Their main natural predator is the weka, but they have no defences against introduced mammalian predators, such as brushtail possums (Trichosurus vulpecula), pigs, hedgehogs, and rats. Possums have been shown to eat up to 60 snails in one night. Habitat modification and trampling by introduced animals like goats, deer, and cows is also a threat.

Controlling predatory mammals is now critical to the survival of Powelliphanta, and many recovery plans are being undertaken by the Department of Conservation. After aerial application of 1080 poison, P. "Anatoki Range" numbers increased threefold at sites in Kahurangi National Park, with large numbers of juveniles present. Prior to applying 1080, there were 54 snails found on a 500 sq grid. One year after the 1080 drop, 147 snails were found on the same plot. Between 1994 and 2010, a series of three aerial 1080 operations over 3430 ha of the Ruahine Forest Park resulted in significant increases in Powelliphanta marchanti. The subspecies Powelliphanta gilliesi brunnea and Powelliphanta traversi otakia are the most threatened. The IUCN Red List states for Powelliphanta marchantii a lower risk, near threatened.

It is illegal since 1982 to collect shells of Powelliphanta; collecting live animals for their shells may have made some species rarer, but some species also need to feed on discarded shells to recycle their calcium lining.

== Species ==
Species within the genus Powelliphanta include:

- Powelliphanta annectens
- Powelliphanta augusta
- Powelliphanta fiordlandica
- Powelliphanta gilliesi
- Powelliphanta hochstetteri (type species)
- Powelliphanta lignaria
- Powelliphanta marchanti
- Powelliphanta patrickensis
- Powelliphanta rossiana
- Powelliphanta spedeni
- Powelliphanta superba
- Powelliphanta traversi

Undescribed species

- Powelliphanta "Anatoki Range"
- Powelliphanta "Baton"
- Powelliphanta "Buller"
- Powelliphanta "Egmont"
- Powelliphanta "Garibaldi"
- Powelliphanta "Haast"
- Powelliphanta "Kirwans"
- Powelliphanta "Lodestone"
- Powelliphanta "Matakitaki"
- Powelliphanta "Matiri"
- Powelliphanta "Maungaharuru"
- Powelliphanta "Nelson Lakes"
- Powelliphanta "Owen"
- Powelliphanta "Parapara"
- Powelliphanta "Urewera"
- Powelliphanta "vittatus"

== Cultural relevance ==
A Powelliphanta illustrated by Dave Gunson appeared on a New Zealand 40-cent postage stamp, issued October 1997.
