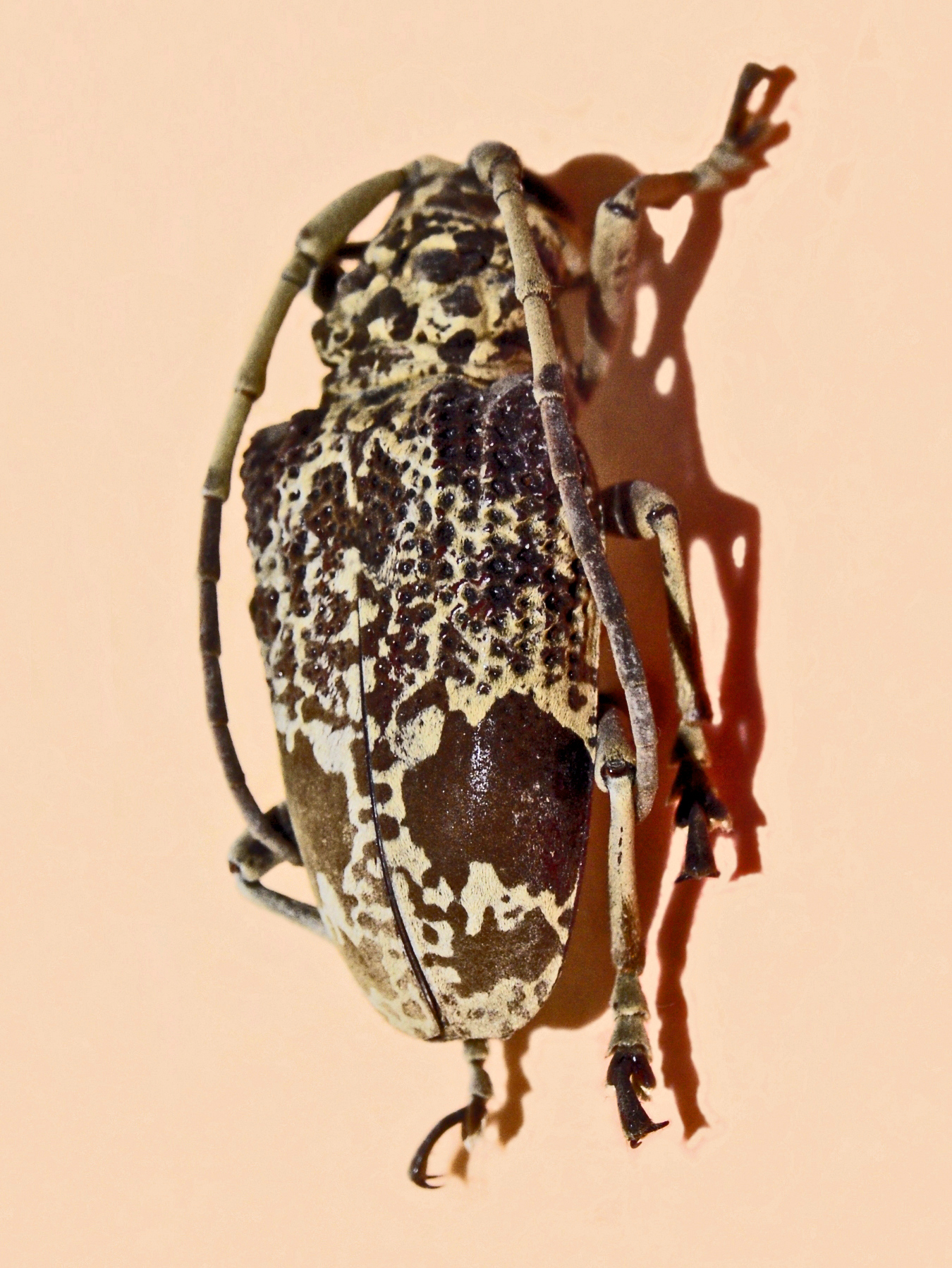
- Museum specimen of Phryneta marmorea

Scientific classification
- Domain: Eukaryota
- Kingdom: Animalia
- Phylum: Arthropoda
- Class: Insecta
- Order: Coleoptera
- Suborder: Polyphaga
- Infraorder: Cucujiformia
- Family: Cerambycidae
- Subfamily: Lamiinae
- Tribe: Phrynetini; Thomson, 1864

= Phrynetini =

Tribe of beetles

Phrynetini is a tribe of longhorn beetles of the subfamily Lamiinae. It was described by Thomson in 1864.

== Taxonomy ==
- Brachytritus Quedenfeldt, 1882
- Calothyrza Thomson, 1868
- Eurysops Chevrolat, 1855
- Homelix Thomson, 1858
- Mimocalothyrza Breuning & Téocchi, 1982
- Paraphryneta Breuning, 1937
- Paromelix Aurivillius, 1907
- Phryneta Dejean, 1835
- Phrynetoides Duvivier, 1891
- Phrynetopsis Kolbe, 1894
- Pseudhomelix Breuning, 1937
- Stenophryneta Aurivillius, 1907
