= Paraphryneta guttata =

Scientific classification
- Kingdom: Animalia
- Phylum: Arthropoda
- Class: Insecta
- Order: Coleoptera
- Suborder: Polyphaga
- Infraorder: Cucujiformia
- Family: Cerambycidae
- Genus: Paraphryneta
- Species: P. guttata

Binomial name
- Paraphryneta guttata (Quedenfeldt, 1888)

Synonyms
- Inesida guttata Quedenfeldt, 1888

Species of beetle

Paraphryneta guttata is a species of beetle in the family Cerambycidae. It was described by Quedenfeldt in 1888, originally under the genus Inesida.
