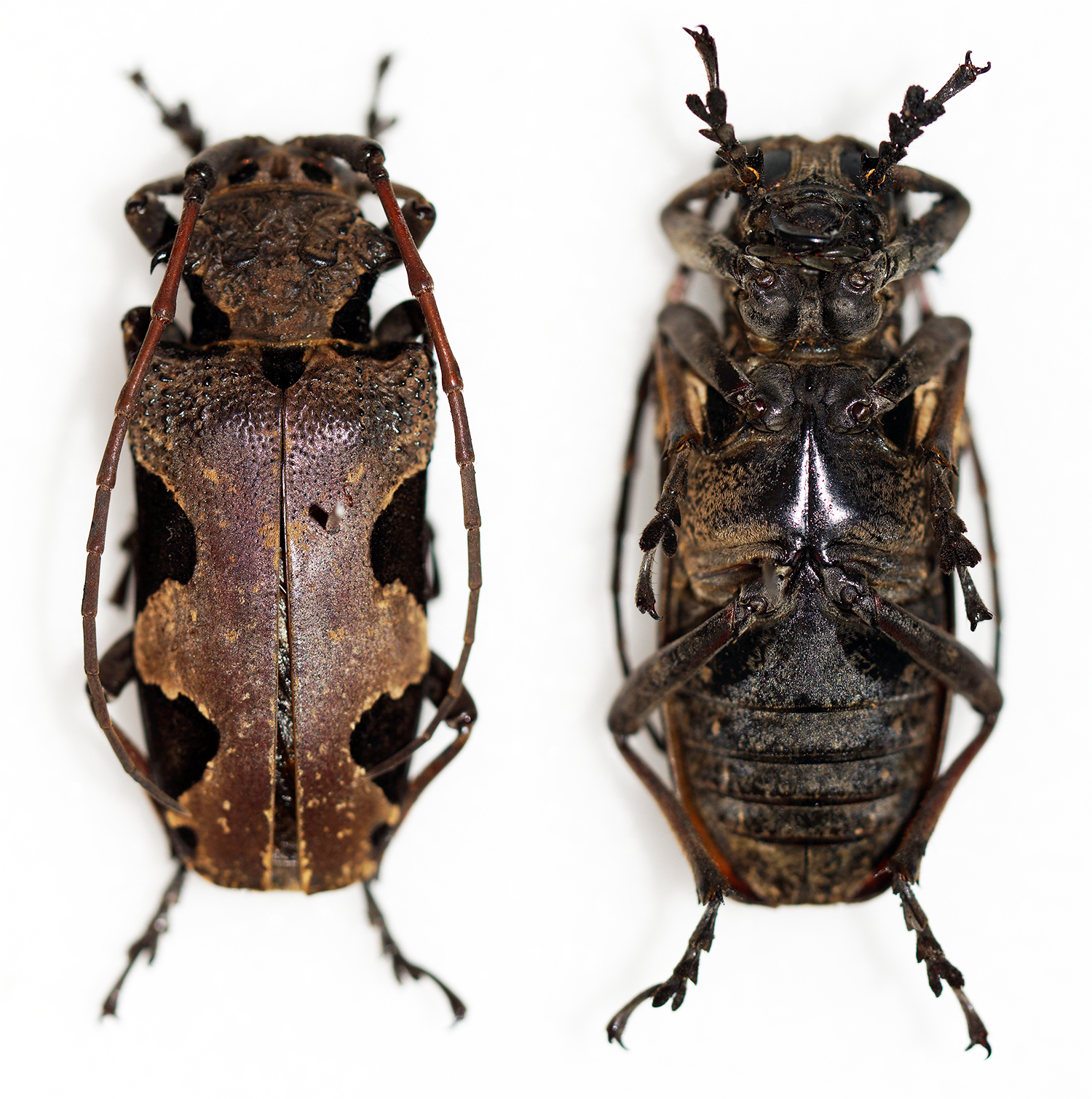

Scientific classification
- Kingdom: Animalia
- Phylum: Arthropoda
- Class: Insecta
- Order: Coleoptera
- Suborder: Polyphaga
- Infraorder: Cucujiformia
- Family: Cerambycidae
- Genus: Phrynetoides
- Species: P. regius

Binomial name
- Phrynetoides regius (Aurivillius, 1886)

Synonyms
- Phryneta regia Aurivillius, 1886; Phrynetoides quadrimaculatus Duvivier, 1891

= Phrynetoides regius =

Species of beetle

Phrynetoides regius is a species of beetle in the family Cerambycidae. It was described by Per Olof Christopher Aurivillius in 1886, originally under the genus Phryneta. It is known from Tanzania, the Central African Republic, the Democratic Republic of the Congo, Ivory Coast, Uganda, Cameroon, and Kenya. It feeds on Theobroma cacao and Petersianthus macrocarpus.
