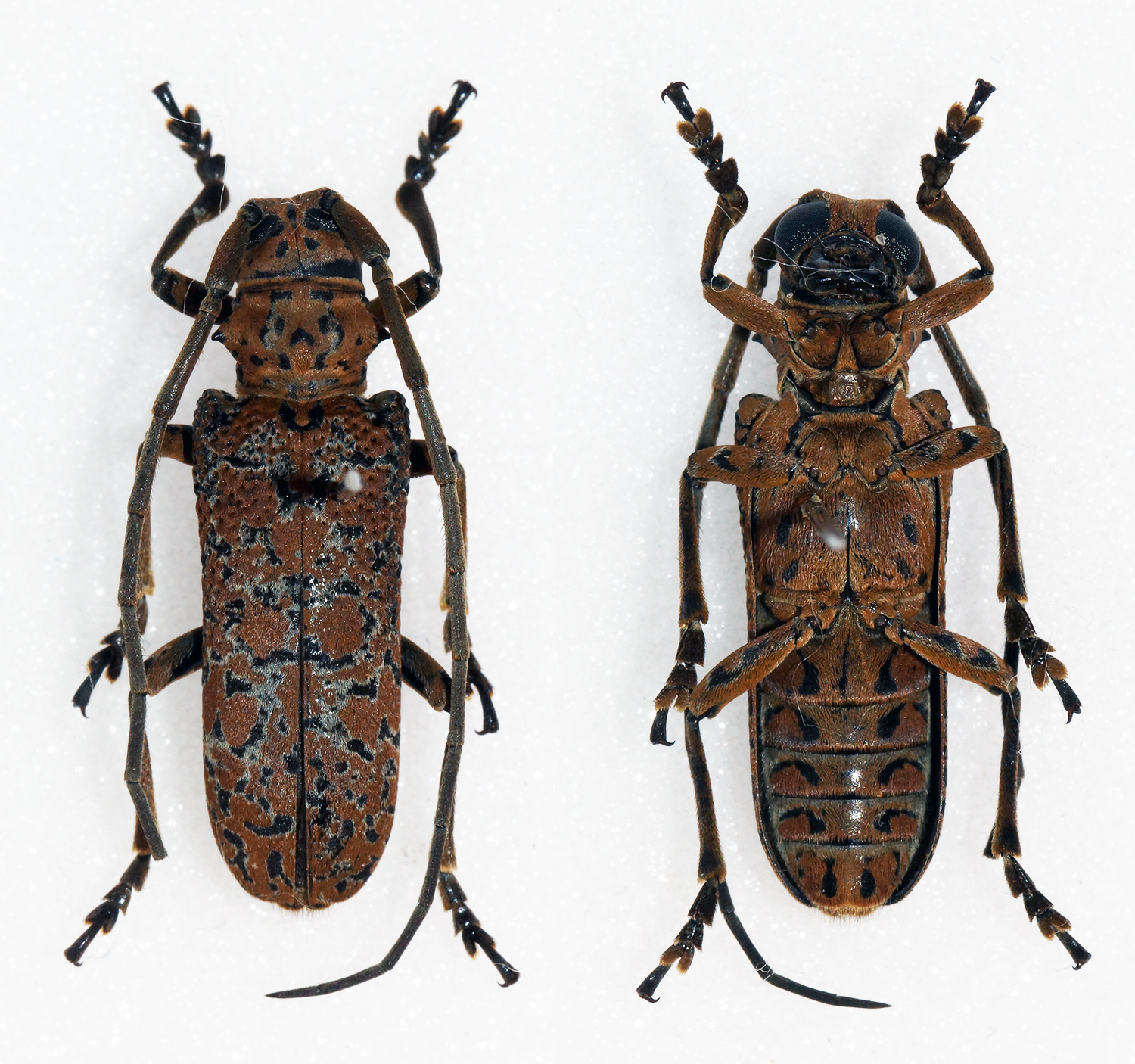

Scientific classification
- Kingdom: Animalia
- Phylum: Arthropoda
- Class: Insecta
- Order: Coleoptera
- Suborder: Polyphaga
- Infraorder: Cucujiformia
- Family: Cerambycidae
- Tribe: Phrynetini
- Genus: Stenophryneta; Aurivillius, 1907
- Species: S. variegata

Binomial name
- Stenophryneta variegata Aurivillius, 1907

= Stenophryneta =

Genus of beetles

Stenophryneta is a monotypic beetle genus in the family Cerambycidae described by Per Olof Christopher Aurivillius in 1907. Its only species, Stenophryneta variegata, was described by the same author in the same year.
