= Phryneta escalerai =

Scientific classification
- Kingdom: Animalia
- Phylum: Arthropoda
- Clade: Pancrustacea
- Class: Insecta
- Order: Coleoptera
- Suborder: Polyphaga
- Infraorder: Cucujiformia
- Family: Cerambycidae
- Genus: Phryneta
- Species: P. escalerai

Binomial name
- Phryneta escalerai Báguena & Breuning, 1958

Species of beetle

Phryneta escalerai is a species of beetle in the family Cerambycidae. It was described by Báguena and Stephan von Breuning in 1958. It is known from Bioko.
