= Eurysops burgeoni =

Scientific classification
- Kingdom: Animalia
- Phylum: Arthropoda
- Class: Insecta
- Order: Coleoptera
- Suborder: Polyphaga
- Infraorder: Cucujiformia
- Family: Cerambycidae
- Genus: Eurysops
- Species: E. burgeoni

Binomial name
- Eurysops burgeoni Breuning, 1935

Species of beetle

Eurysops burgeoni is a species of beetle in the family Cerambycidae. It was described by Stephan von Breuning in 1935. It feeds on Morus alba.

== Subspecies ==
- Eurysops burgeoni burgeoni Breuning, 1935
- Eurysops burgeoni dudleyi Sudre & Téocchi, 2002
