= Phryneta obliquata =

Scientific classification
- Kingdom: Animalia
- Phylum: Arthropoda
- Clade: Pancrustacea
- Class: Insecta
- Order: Coleoptera
- Suborder: Polyphaga
- Infraorder: Cucujiformia
- Family: Cerambycidae
- Genus: Phryneta
- Species: P. obliquata

Binomial name
- Phryneta obliquata (Harold, 1878)

Synonyms
- Phryneta albomesosternalis Breuning, 1986

Species of beetle

Phryneta obliquata is a species of beetle in the family Cerambycidae. It was described by Harold in 1878. It is known from Tanzania, Uganda, Somalia, the Democratic Republic of the Congo, Ethiopia and Kenya.
