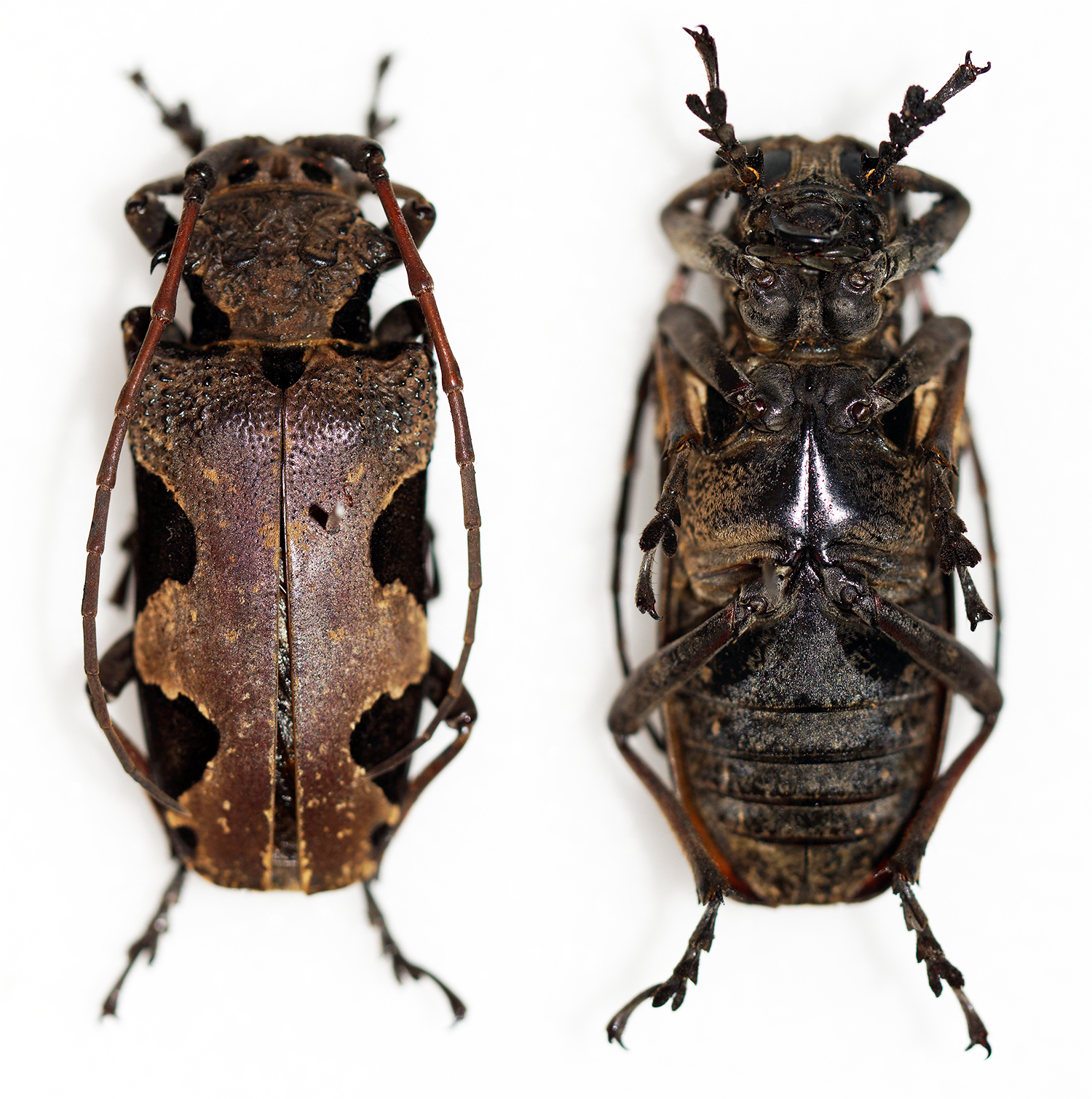
- Phrynetoides regius (male)

Scientific classification
- Kingdom: Animalia
- Phylum: Arthropoda
- Class: Insecta
- Order: Coleoptera
- Suborder: Polyphaga
- Infraorder: Cucujiformia
- Family: Cerambycidae
- Tribe: Phrynetini
- Genus: Phrynetoides

= Phrynetoides =

Genus of beetles

Phrynetoides is a genus of longhorn beetles of the subfamily Lamiinae, containing the following species:

- Phrynetoides minor Schwarzer, 1931
- Phrynetoides regius (Aurivillius, 1886)
