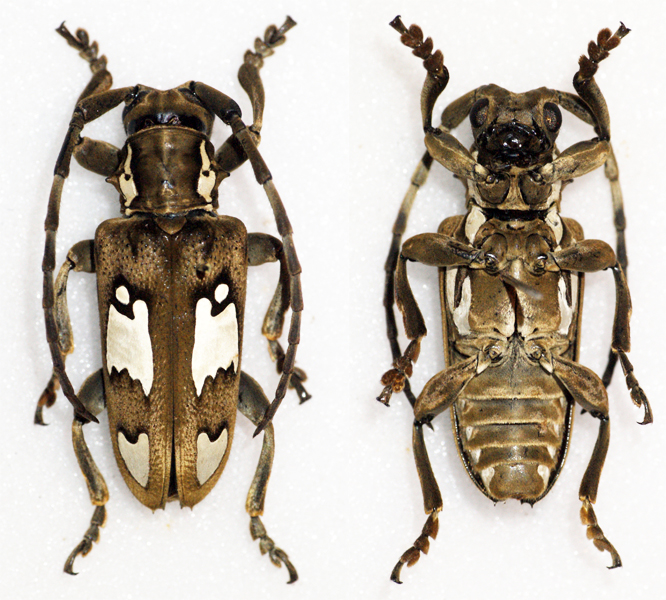

Scientific classification
- Kingdom: Animalia
- Phylum: Arthropoda
- Class: Insecta
- Order: Coleoptera
- Suborder: Polyphaga
- Infraorder: Cucujiformia
- Family: Cerambycidae
- Genus: Mimocalothyrza
- Species: M. speyeri

Binomial name
- Mimocalothyrza speyeri (Hintz, 1919)

Synonyms
- Calothyrza speyeri Hintz, 1919

= Mimocalothyrza speyeri =

Species of beetle

Mimocalothyrza speyeri is a species of beetle in the family Cerambycidae. It was described by Eugen Hintz in 1919. It is known from the Ivory Coast and Cameroon.
