= Phrynetopsis variegata =

Scientific classification
- Kingdom: Animalia
- Phylum: Arthropoda
- Class: Insecta
- Order: Coleoptera
- Suborder: Polyphaga
- Infraorder: Cucujiformia
- Family: Cerambycidae
- Genus: Phrynetopsis
- Species: P. variegata

Binomial name
- Phrynetopsis variegata (Reiche, 1849)

Synonyms
- Pachystola variegata Reiche, 1849

Species of beetle

Phrynetopsis variegata is a species of beetle in the family Cerambycidae. It was described by Reiche in 1849. It is known from Ethiopia.
