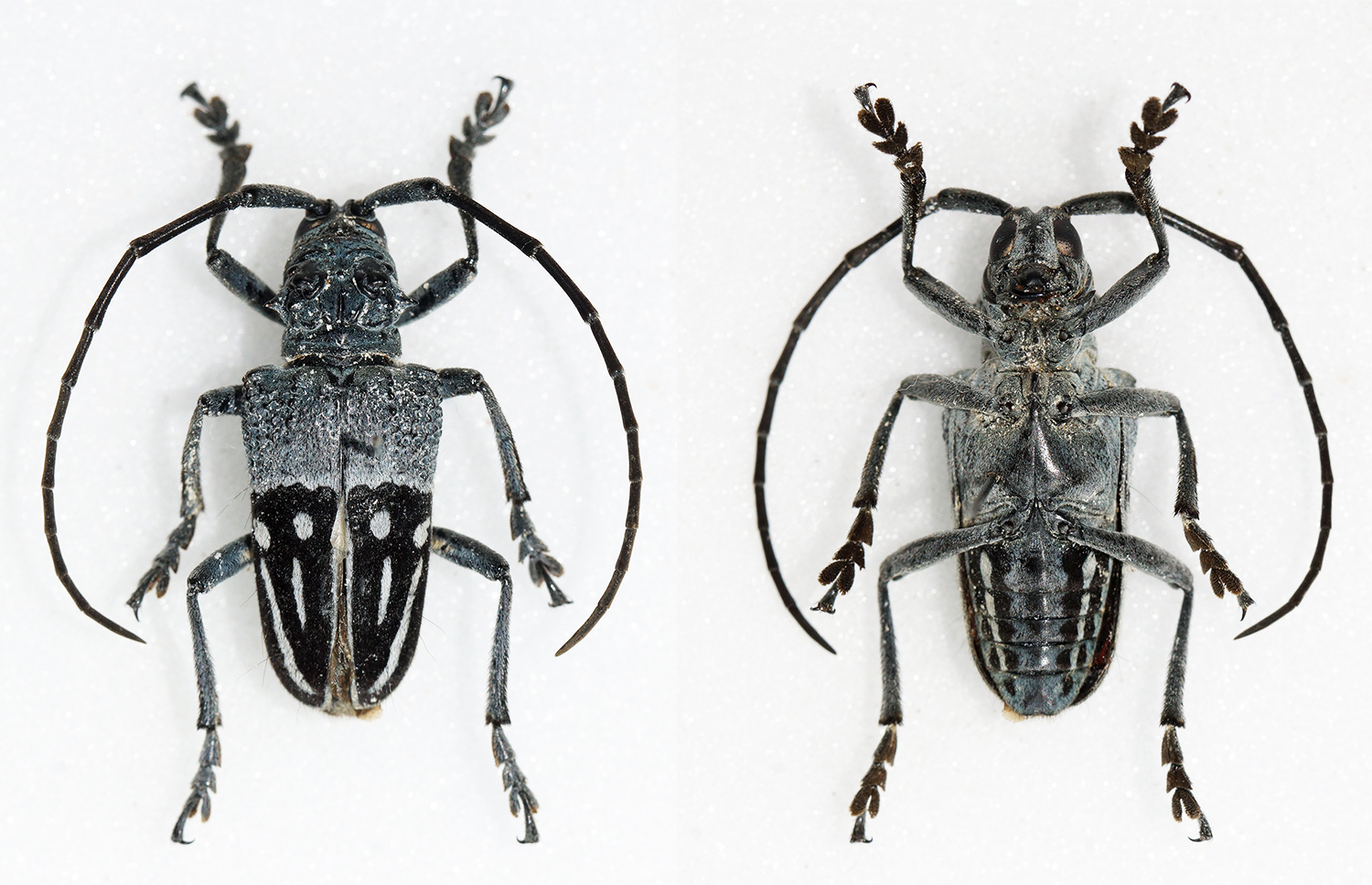

Scientific classification
- Kingdom: Animalia
- Phylum: Arthropoda
- Clade: Pancrustacea
- Class: Insecta
- Order: Coleoptera
- Suborder: Polyphaga
- Infraorder: Cucujiformia
- Family: Cerambycidae
- Genus: Phryneta
- Species: P. pulchra

Binomial name
- Phryneta pulchra Tippmann, 1958

Synonyms
- Phryneta bicoloripennis Breuning, 1965

= Phryneta pulchra =

Species of beetle

Phryneta pulchra is a species of beetle in the family Cerambycidae. It was described by Tippmann in 1958. It is known from Cameroon.
