= Phrynetopsis trituberculata =

Scientific classification
- Domain: Eukaryota
- Kingdom: Animalia
- Phylum: Arthropoda
- Class: Insecta
- Order: Coleoptera
- Suborder: Polyphaga
- Infraorder: Cucujiformia
- Family: Cerambycidae
- Genus: Phrynetopsis
- Species: P. trituberculata

Binomial name
- Phrynetopsis trituberculata Kolbe, 1894

Synonyms
- Phrynetopsis trituberculatus (Kolbe) Sudre & Téocchi, 2002 (misspelling)

Species of beetle

Phrynetopsis trituberculata is a species of beetle in the family Cerambycidae. It was described by Hermann Julius Kolbe in 1894. It has been found in Senegal, Malawi, Gambia, Tanzania, and South Africa.
