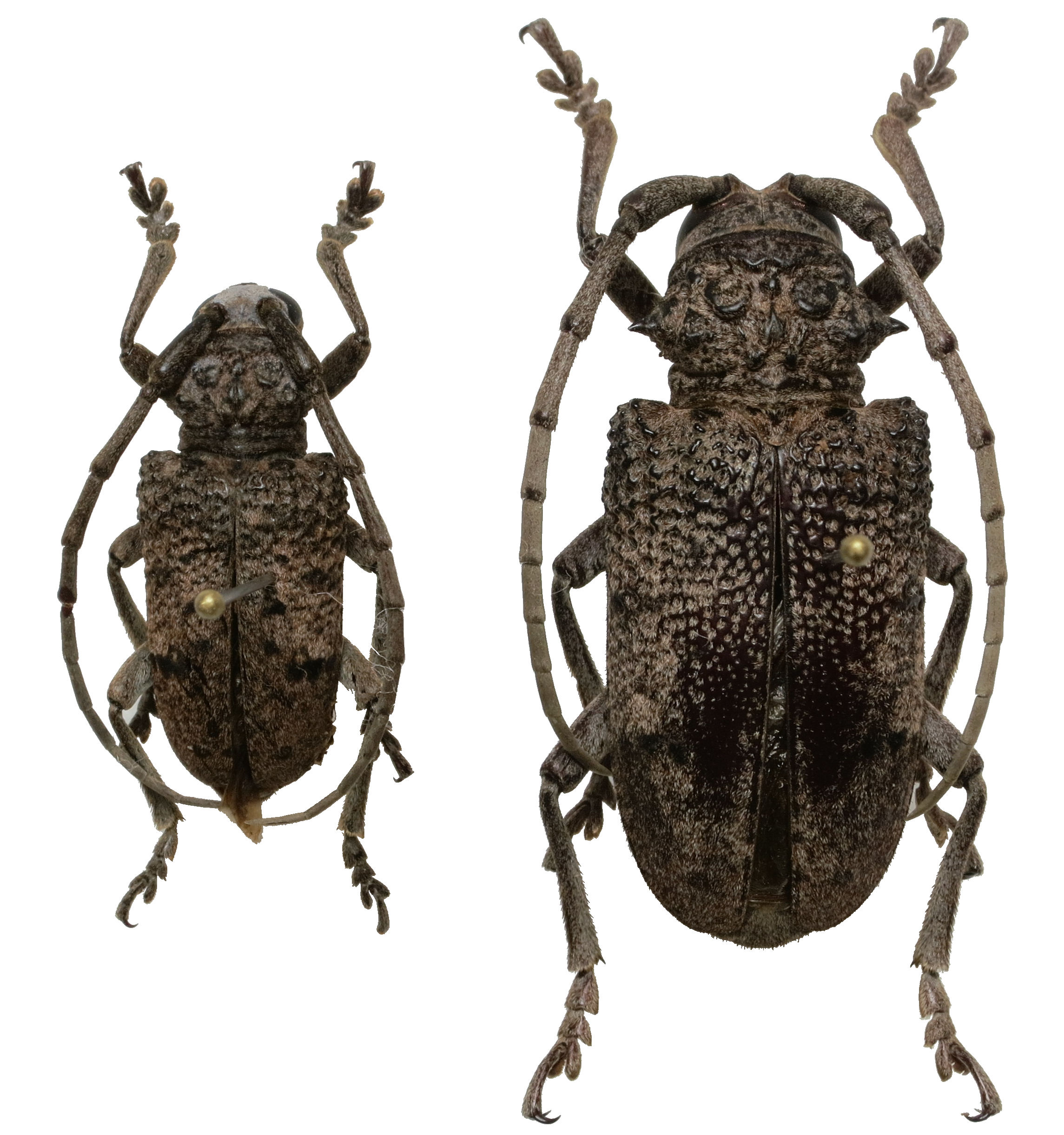
- Phryneta spinator from Togo

Scientific classification
- Kingdom: Animalia
- Phylum: Arthropoda
- Clade: Pancrustacea
- Class: Insecta
- Order: Coleoptera
- Suborder: Polyphaga
- Infraorder: Cucujiformia
- Family: Cerambycidae
- Genus: Phryneta
- Species: P. spinator

Binomial name
- Phryneta spinator (Fabricius, 1792)

Synonyms
- Lamia spinator Fabricius, 1792

= Phryneta spinator =

Fig tree borer

Species of beetle

Phryneta spinator, the fig-tree borer longhorn beetle or fig tree borer, is a species of beetle in the family Cerambycidae. It was described by Johan Christian Fabricius in 1792, originally under the genus Lamia. It has a wide distribution throughout Africa. It feeds on Pyrus communis, Ficus carica, Salix babylonica, Cupressus sempervirens, and Vitis vinifera.

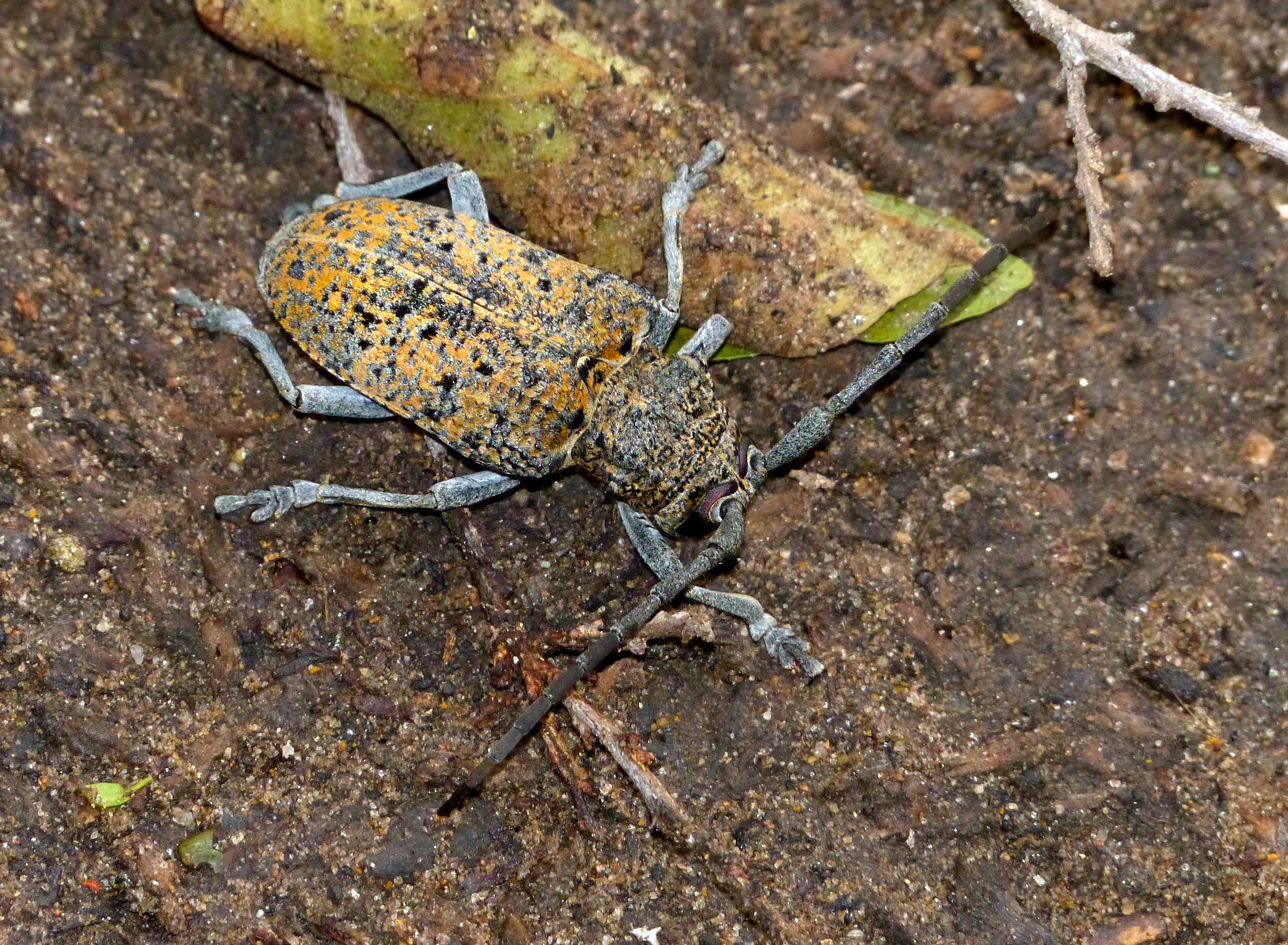
Fig tree borer in the Kruger Park

== Varieties ==
- Phryneta spinator var. obscura (Olivier, 1792)
- Phryneta spinator var. ugandae Aurivillius, 1914
