= Phryneta coeca =

Scientific classification
- Kingdom: Animalia
- Phylum: Arthropoda
- Clade: Pancrustacea
- Class: Insecta
- Order: Coleoptera
- Suborder: Polyphaga
- Infraorder: Cucujiformia
- Family: Cerambycidae
- Genus: Phryneta
- Species: P. coeca

Binomial name
- Phryneta coeca Chevrolat, 1857

Species of beetle

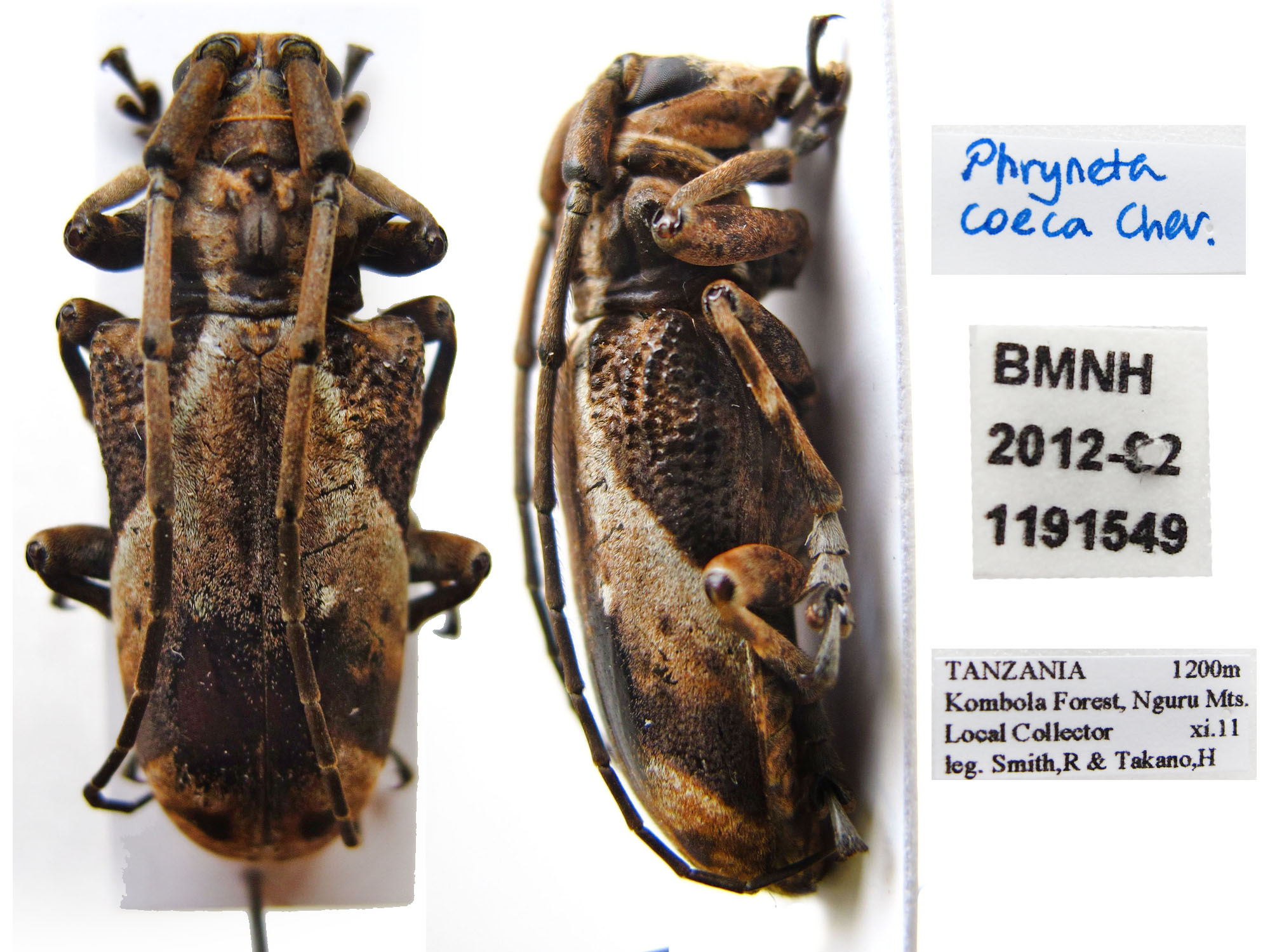
Phryneta coeca

Phryneta coeca is a species of beetle in the family Cerambycidae. It was described by Chevrolat in 1857. It is known from Tanzania, the Central African Republic, the Ivory Coast, Cameroon, the Democratic Republic of the Congo, and Togo.

== Subspecies ==
- Phryneta coeca assimilis Kolbe, 1894
- Phryneta coeca coeca Chevrolat, 1857
