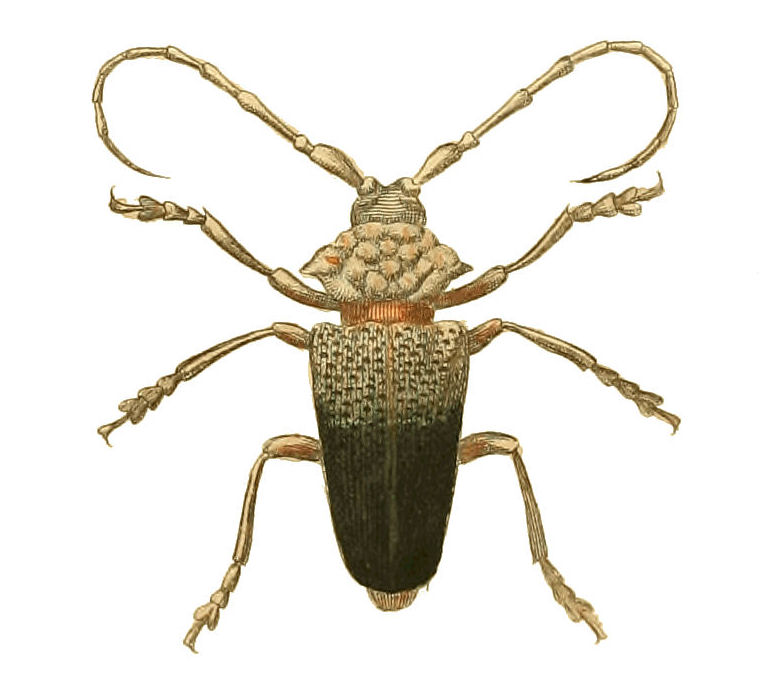

Scientific classification
- Kingdom: Animalia
- Phylum: Arthropoda
- Clade: Pancrustacea
- Class: Insecta
- Order: Coleoptera
- Suborder: Polyphaga
- Infraorder: Cucujiformia
- Family: Cerambycidae
- Genus: Phryneta
- Species: P. verrucosa

Binomial name
- Phryneta verrucosa (Drury, 1773)

Synonyms
- Cerambyx sternutator (Fabricius, 1775); Cerambyx verrucosus Drury, 1773; Lamia squamata Goeze, 1777; Lamia sternutator Fabricius, 1775; Lamia verrucosa (Drury, 1773); Phryneta melanoptera Thomson, 1878; Phryneta viettei Villiers, 1957; Lamia verrucata (Drury, 1773) (misspelling)

= Phryneta verrucosa =

Species of beetle

Phryneta verrucosa is a species of beetle in the family Cerambycidae. It was described by Dru Drury in 1773, originally under the genus Cerambyx. It is known from Equatorial Guinea, and was introduced into Barbados, Grenada, and Trinidad and Tobago.
