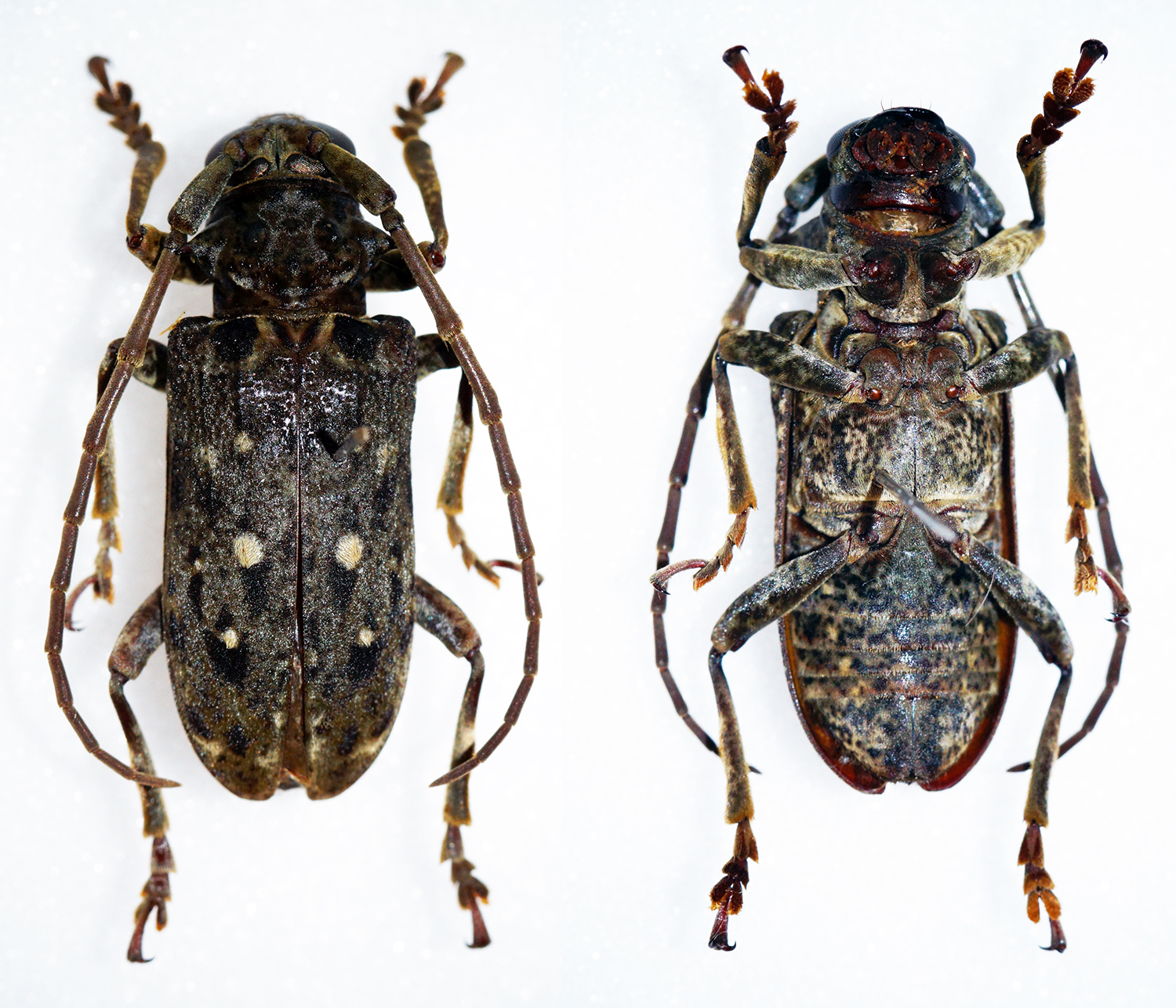

Scientific classification
- Domain: Eukaryota
- Kingdom: Animalia
- Phylum: Arthropoda
- Class: Insecta
- Order: Coleoptera
- Suborder: Polyphaga
- Infraorder: Cucujiformia
- Family: Cerambycidae
- Genus: Phrynetopsis
- Species: P. thomensis

Binomial name
- Phrynetopsis thomensis Jordan, 1903

Synonyms
- Phrynetopsis thomensis principis Breuning, 1952

= Phrynetopsis thomensis =

Species of beetle

Phrynetopsis thomensis is a species of beetle in the family Cerambycidae. It was described by Karl Jordan in 1903. It is known from São Tomé and Príncipe.
