= Calothyrza sehestedti =

Scientific classification
- Kingdom: Animalia
- Phylum: Arthropoda
- Clade: Pancrustacea
- Class: Insecta
- Order: Coleoptera
- Suborder: Polyphaga
- Infraorder: Cucujiformia
- Family: Cerambycidae
- Genus: Calothyrza
- Species: C. sehestedti

Binomial name
- Calothyrza sehestedti (Fabricius, 1798)

Synonyms
- Lamia sehestedii Fabricius, 1798

Species of beetle

Calothyrza sehestedti is a species of beetle in the family Cerambycidae. It was described by Johan Christian Fabricius in 1798. It is known from Sri Lanka and India.
