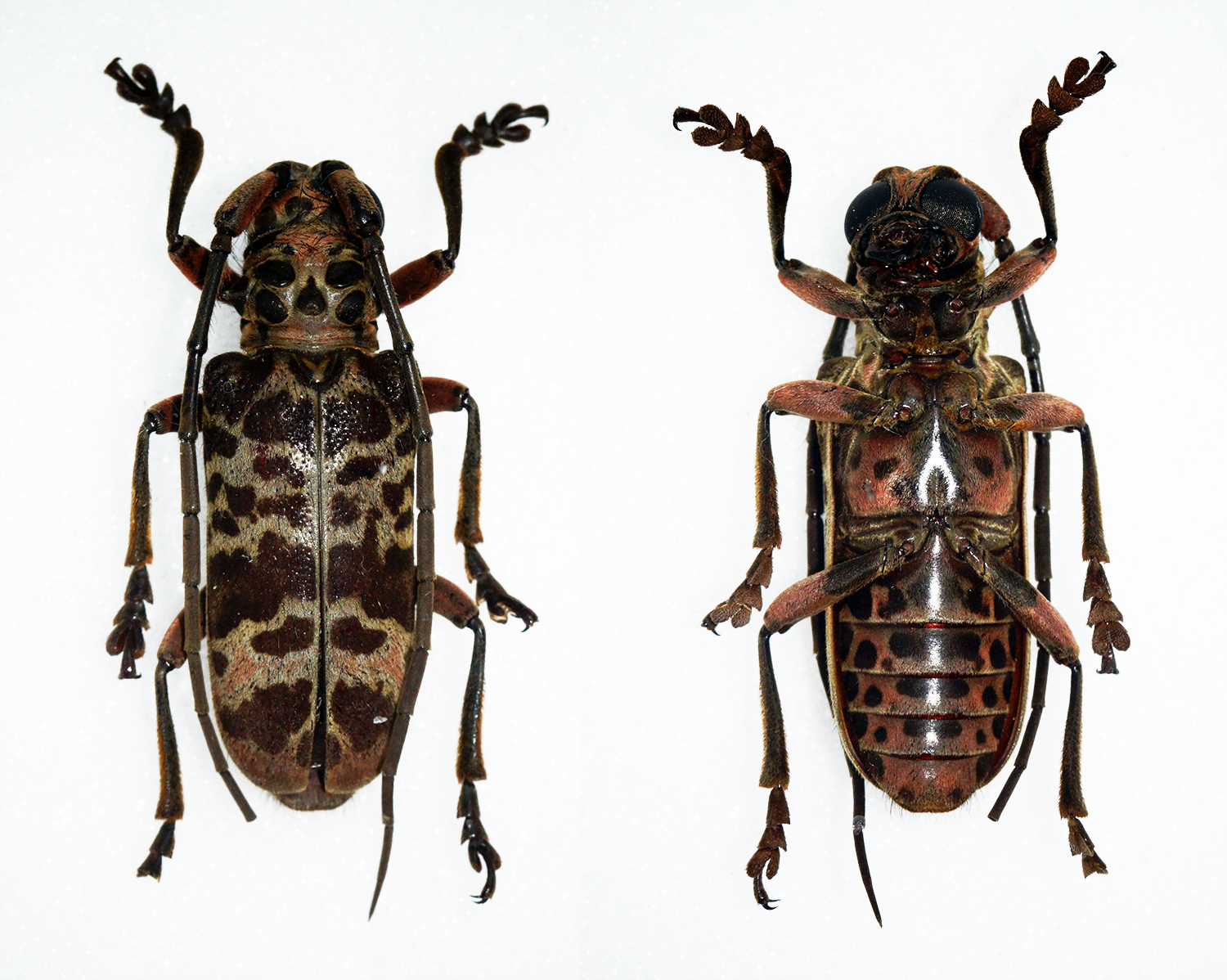

Scientific classification
- Domain: Eukaryota
- Kingdom: Animalia
- Phylum: Arthropoda
- Class: Insecta
- Order: Coleoptera
- Suborder: Polyphaga
- Infraorder: Cucujiformia
- Family: Cerambycidae
- Genus: Eurysops
- Species: E. esau

Binomial name
- Eurysops esau Chevrolat, 1855

= Eurysops esau =

Species of beetle

Eurysops esau is a species of beetle in the family Cerambycidae. It was described by Chevrolat in 1855. It is known from Nigeria, Cameroon, Ghana, the Central African Republic, the Democratic Republic of the Congo, Benin, Gabon, the Ivory Coast, Sierra Leone, Liberia, and Togo.
