= Phryneta hecphora =

Scientific classification
- Kingdom: Animalia
- Phylum: Arthropoda
- Clade: Pancrustacea
- Class: Insecta
- Order: Coleoptera
- Suborder: Polyphaga
- Infraorder: Cucujiformia
- Family: Cerambycidae
- Genus: Phryneta
- Species: P. hecphora

Binomial name
- Phryneta hecphora Thomson, 1857

Synonyms
- Phrystola bulbosa Hintz, 1916

Species of beetle

Phryneta hecphora is a species of beetle in the family Cerambycidae. It was described by James Thomson in 1857. It is known from Mozambique and Democratic Republic of the Congo.
