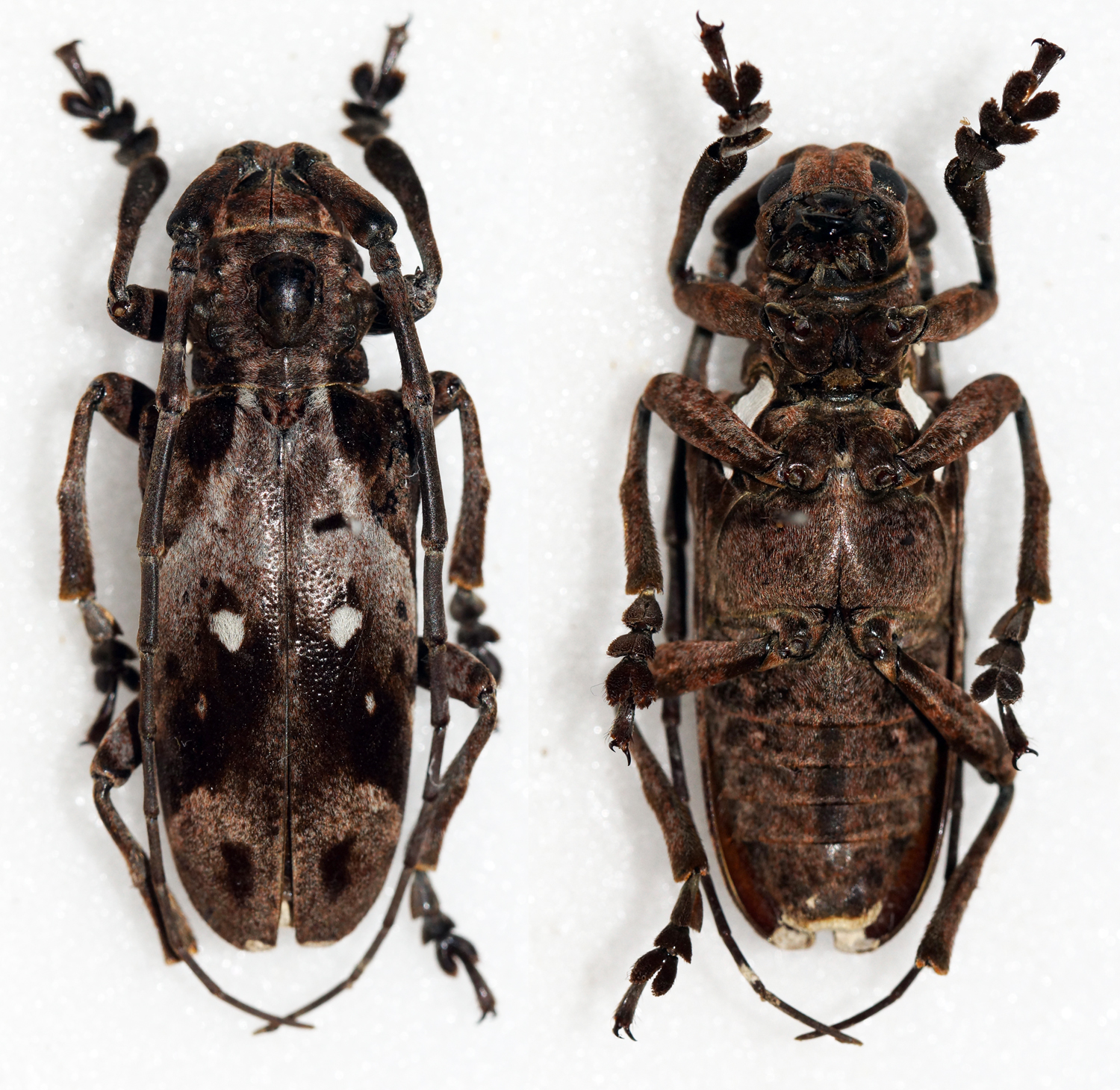

Scientific classification
- Kingdom: Animalia
- Phylum: Arthropoda
- Clade: Pancrustacea
- Class: Insecta
- Order: Coleoptera
- Suborder: Polyphaga
- Infraorder: Cucujiformia
- Family: Cerambycidae
- Genus: Phryneta
- Species: P. bulbifera

Binomial name
- Phryneta bulbifera (Kolbe, 1894)

Synonyms
- Phrystola bulbifera Kolbe, 1894

= Phryneta bulbifera =

Species of beetle

Phryneta bulbifera is a species of beetle in the family Cerambycidae. It was described by Hermann Julius Kolbe in 1894, originally under the genus Phrystola. It is known from the Democratic Republic of the Congo and Cameroon.
