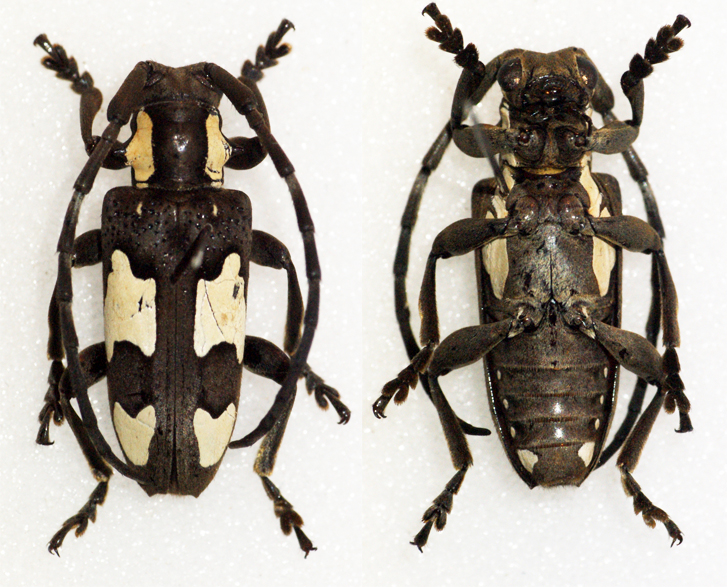
- Mimocalothyrza bottegoi

Scientific classification
- Kingdom: Animalia
- Phylum: Arthropoda
- Class: Insecta
- Order: Coleoptera
- Suborder: Polyphaga
- Infraorder: Cucujiformia
- Family: Cerambycidae
- Tribe: Phrynetini
- Genus: Mimocalothyrza

= Mimocalothyrza =

Genus of beetles

Mimocalothyrza is a genus of longhorn beetles of the subfamily Lamiinae, containing the following species:

- Mimocalothyrza bottegoi (Gestro, 1895)
- Mimocalothyrza speyeri (Hintz, 1919)
