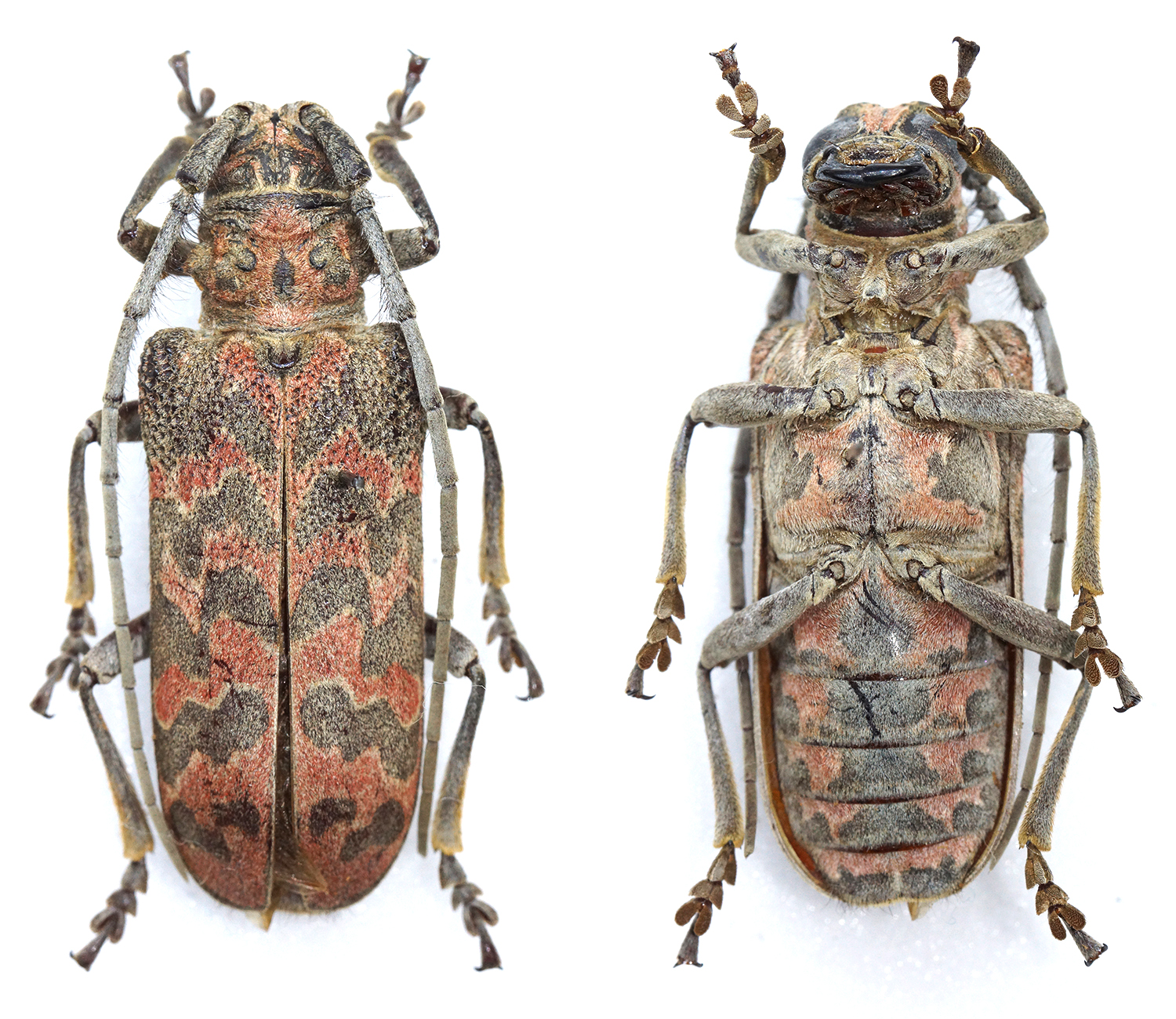
- Female specimen of Eurysops insignis

Scientific classification
- Domain: Eukaryota
- Kingdom: Animalia
- Phylum: Arthropoda
- Class: Insecta
- Order: Coleoptera
- Suborder: Polyphaga
- Infraorder: Cucujiformia
- Family: Cerambycidae
- Genus: Eurysops
- Species: E. insignis

Binomial name
- Eurysops insignis Aurivillius, 1910

= Eurysops insignis =

Species of beetle

Eurysops insignis is a species of beetle in the family Cerambycidae. It was described by Per Olof Christopher Aurivillius in 1910.
