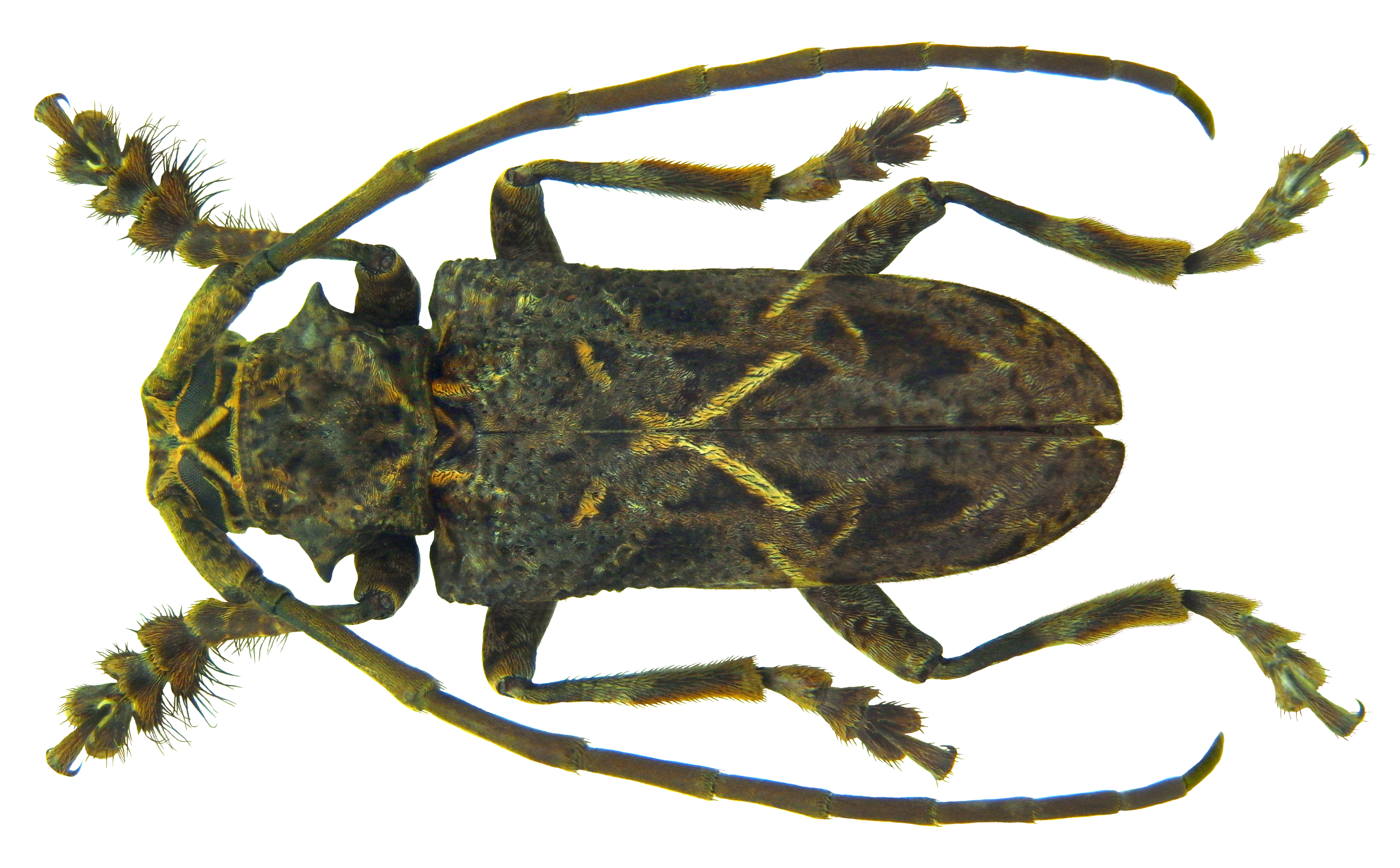

Scientific classification
- Domain: Eukaryota
- Kingdom: Animalia
- Phylum: Arthropoda
- Class: Insecta
- Order: Coleoptera
- Suborder: Polyphaga
- Infraorder: Cucujiformia
- Family: Cerambycidae
- Genus: Phrynetopsis
- Species: P. fuscicornis

Binomial name
- Phrynetopsis fuscicornis (Chevrolat, 1856)

Synonyms
- Phryneta fortificata White, 1858; Phryneta senegambiae Thomson, 1857; Temnoscelis fuscicornis Chevrolat, 1856

= Phrynetopsis fuscicornis =

Species of beetle

Phrynetopsis fuscicornis is a species of beetle in the family Cerambycidae. It was described by Chevrolat in 1856. It has a wide distribution in Africa. It contains the varietas Phrynetopsis fuscicornis var. mystica.
