= Phryneta crassa =

Scientific classification
- Kingdom: Animalia
- Phylum: Arthropoda
- Clade: Pancrustacea
- Class: Insecta
- Order: Coleoptera
- Suborder: Polyphaga
- Infraorder: Cucujiformia
- Family: Cerambycidae
- Genus: Phryneta
- Species: P. crassa

Binomial name
- Phryneta crassa Jordan, 1903

Species of beetle

Phryneta crassa is a species of beetle in the family Cerambycidae. It was described by Karl Jordan in 1903. It is known from the Central African Republic, Gabon, and the Democratic Republic of the Congo.
