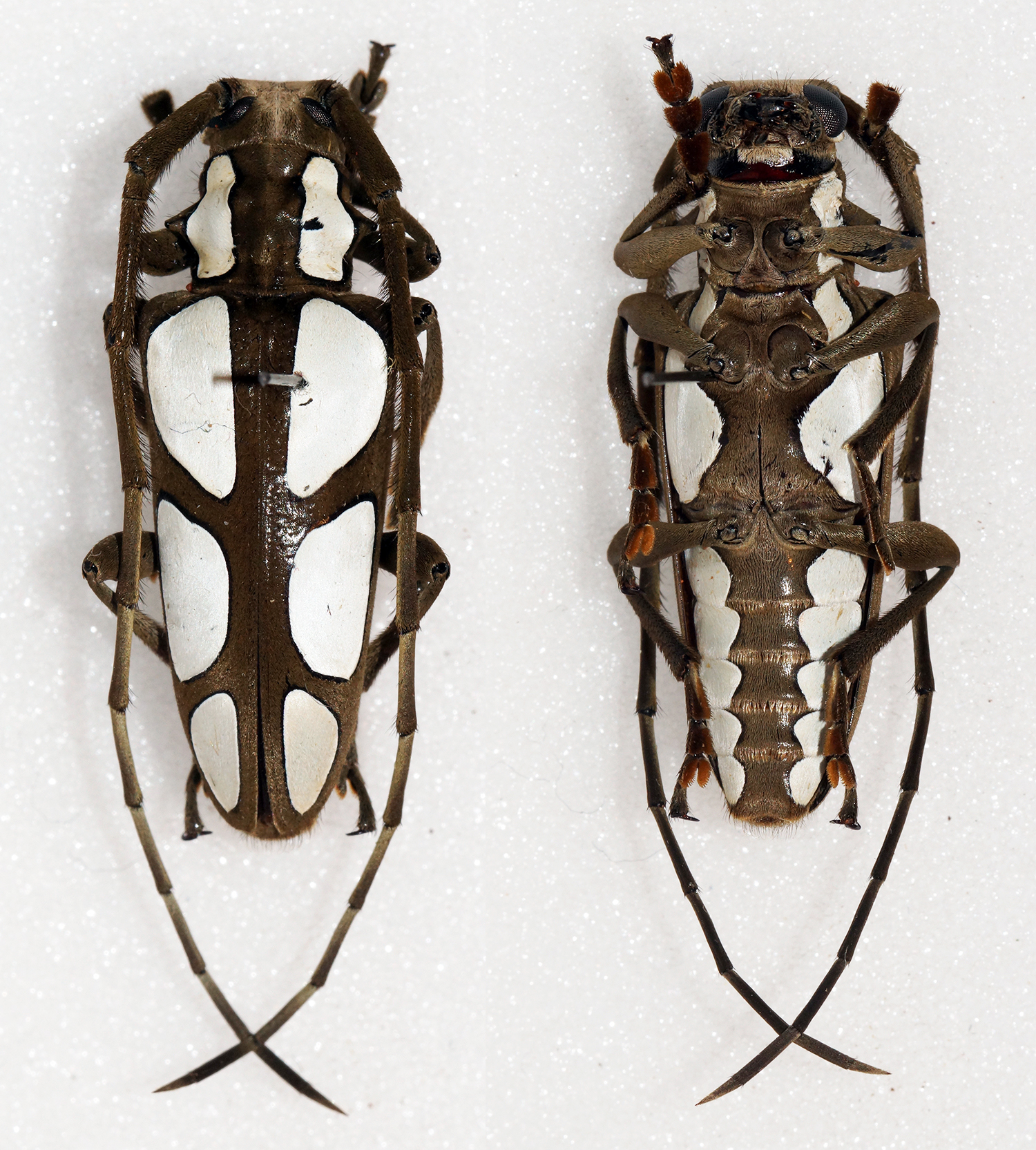

Scientific classification
- Kingdom: Animalia
- Phylum: Arthropoda
- Class: Insecta
- Order: Coleoptera
- Suborder: Polyphaga
- Infraorder: Cucujiformia
- Family: Cerambycidae
- Genus: Calothyrza
- Species: C. pauli

Binomial name
- Calothyrza pauli (Fairmaire, 1884)

Synonyms
- Anoplostetha pauli Fairmaire, 1884

= Calothyrza pauli =

Species of beetle

Calothyrza pauli is a species of beetle in the family Cerambycidae. It was described by Léon Fairmaire in 1884. It is known from Somalia, Kenya, Ethiopia, and Tanzania.
