= Phryneta densepilosa =

Scientific classification
- Kingdom: Animalia
- Phylum: Arthropoda
- Clade: Pancrustacea
- Class: Insecta
- Order: Coleoptera
- Suborder: Polyphaga
- Infraorder: Cucujiformia
- Family: Cerambycidae
- Genus: Phryneta
- Species: P. densepilosa

Binomial name
- Phryneta densepilosa Breuning, 1973

Species of beetle

Phryneta densepilosa is a species of beetle in the family Cerambycidae. It was described by Stephan von Breuning in 1973. It is known from Ghana.
