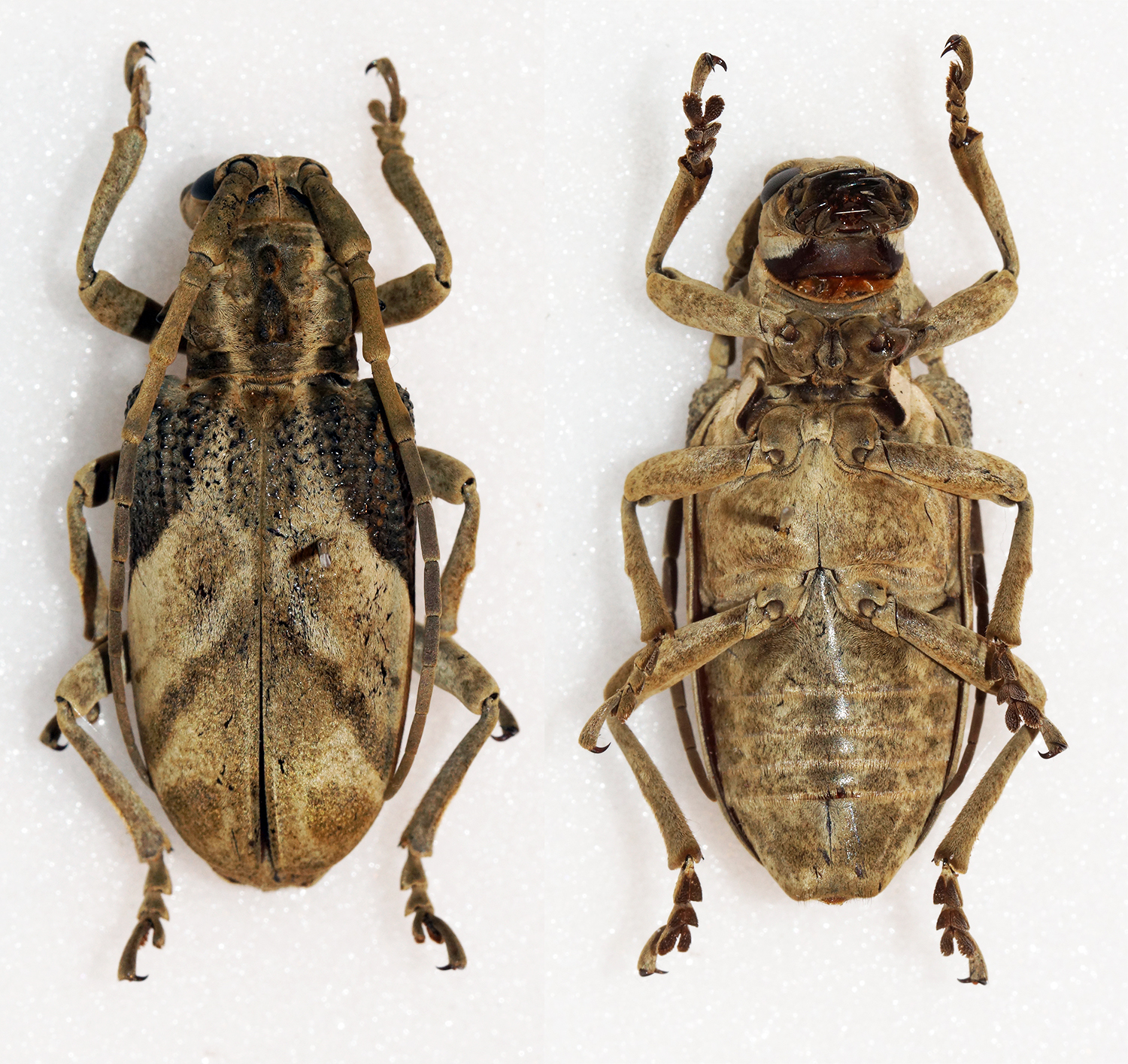

Scientific classification
- Kingdom: Animalia
- Phylum: Arthropoda
- Clade: Pancrustacea
- Class: Insecta
- Order: Coleoptera
- Suborder: Polyphaga
- Infraorder: Cucujiformia
- Family: Cerambycidae
- Genus: Phryneta
- Species: P. semirasa

Binomial name
- Phryneta semirasa Dohrn, 1885

Synonyms
- Phryneta nupera Peringuey, 1892; Phryneta oberthueri (Pascoe, 1886); Chreostes oberthuerii Pascoe, 1886

= Phryneta semirasa =

Species of beetle

Phryneta semirasa is a species of beetle in the family Cerambycidae. It was described by Anton Dohrn in 1885. It is known from Tanzania, the Democratic Republic of the Congo, Mozambique, Zimbabwe, Malawi, and Zambia.
