= Phryneta atricornis =

Scientific classification
- Kingdom: Animalia
- Phylum: Arthropoda
- Clade: Pancrustacea
- Class: Insecta
- Order: Coleoptera
- Suborder: Polyphaga
- Infraorder: Cucujiformia
- Family: Cerambycidae
- Genus: Phryneta
- Species: P. atricornis

Binomial name
- Phryneta atricornis Fairmaire, 1893

Synonyms
- Phryneta semicribosa Fairmaire, 1894

Species of beetle

Phryneta atricornis is a species of beetle in the family Cerambycidae, described by Léon Fairmaire in 1893. It is known to be native to Comoros.
