= Calothyrza jardinei =

Scientific classification
- Kingdom: Animalia
- Phylum: Arthropoda
- Class: Insecta
- Order: Coleoptera
- Suborder: Polyphaga
- Infraorder: Cucujiformia
- Family: Cerambycidae
- Genus: Calothyrza
- Species: C. jardinei

Binomial name
- Calothyrza jardinei (White, 1858)

Synonyms
- Anoplosthaeta jardinei White, 1858

Species of beetle

Calothyrza jardinei is a species of beetle in the family Cerambycidae. It was described by White in 1858. It is known from Tanzania, South Africa, Zambia and the Democratic Republic of the Congo.
