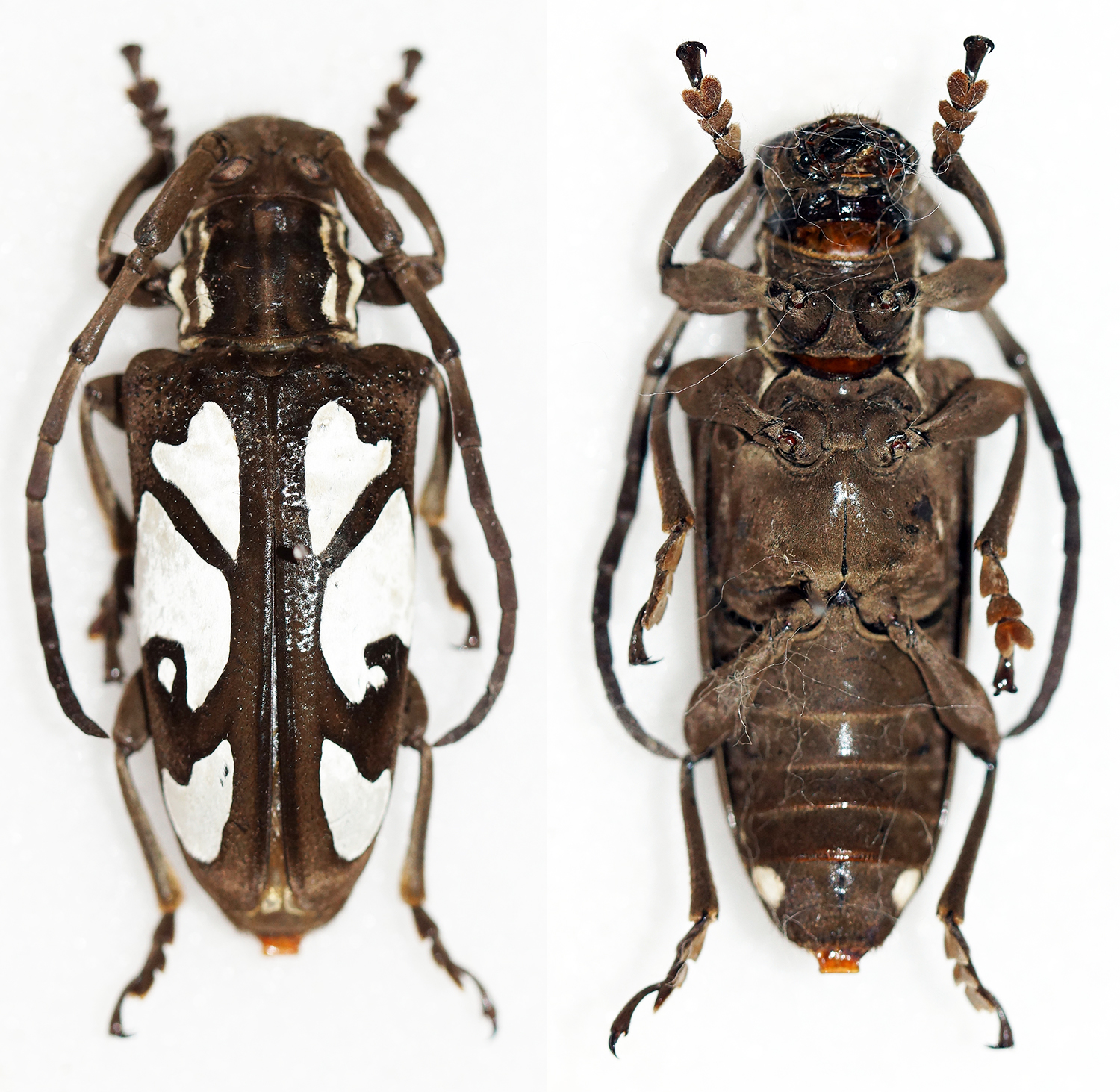

Scientific classification
- Domain: Eukaryota
- Kingdom: Animalia
- Phylum: Arthropoda
- Class: Insecta
- Order: Coleoptera
- Suborder: Polyphaga
- Infraorder: Cucujiformia
- Family: Cerambycidae
- Genus: Calothyrza
- Species: C. margaritifera

Binomial name
- Calothyrza margaritifera (Westwood, 1848)

Synonyms
- Phryneta margaritifera Westwood, 1848

= Calothyrza margaritifera =

Species of beetle

Calothyrza margaritifera is a species of beetle in the family Cerambycidae. It was described by John O. Westwood in 1848 in his "The Cabinet of Oriental Entomology" as Phryneta margaritifera.

== Range ==
Its range has been recorded in literature from Myanmar, India, Thailand, and Nepal. The type locality is Nepal.

In India, it has been recorded in July 2009 from Pen, and subsequently a specimen collected in July 2018 from Chiplun, forming a new range extension to the Western Ghats and first properly documented collection of a specimen from India.

== Description ==
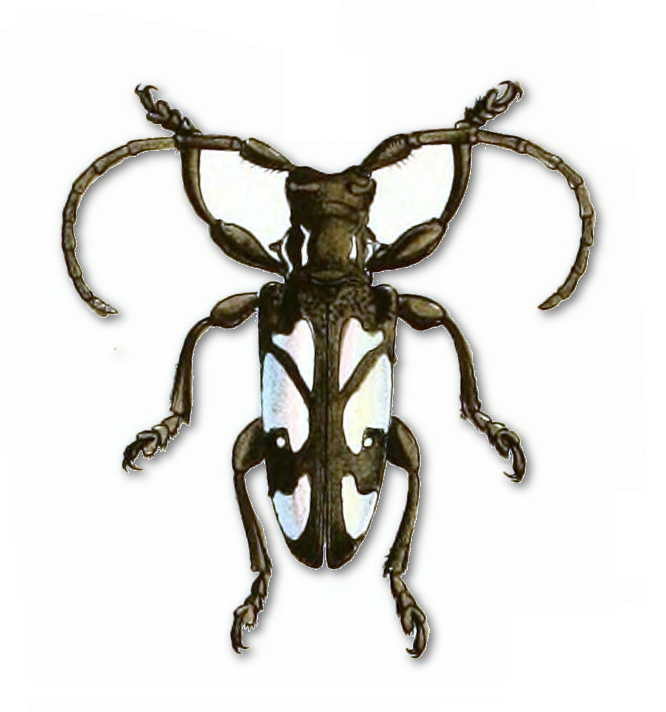
Illustration of Calothyrza maragaritifera from Westwood's 1848 work, The Cabinet of Oriental Entomology.

Westwood (1848) describes the specimen as follows:

"Diagnosis: Phryneta of a velvety brown colour; the sides of the pronotum with two white lines and the elytra with six large irregular-shaped patches of a pearly white colour; the legs incrassated. Length of the body one and fourth of an inch. Breadth of the base of the elytra one half inch. Inhabits Nepal".

Description: "The entire insect is clothed with a fine velvety pile, with the base of the elytra rather coarsely punctured. The parts of the mouth are very short, the eyes strongly incised at the base of the antennae, which are rather short and thick, as are also the spines at the sides of the pronotum. This part of the body has two white lateral lines on each side, and the elytra have six large pearly-white spots, of irregular form, besides two minute white dots. The sterna are simple; and the legs (especially the femora) are thickened. The tips of the elytra are unarmed. The specimens in my collection, presented to me by the Rev. F.W. Hope, are smaller than the one figured, and have the sides of the pronotum occupied by a large white oblong patch instead of two lines, as in Mr. Melly's specimen".
