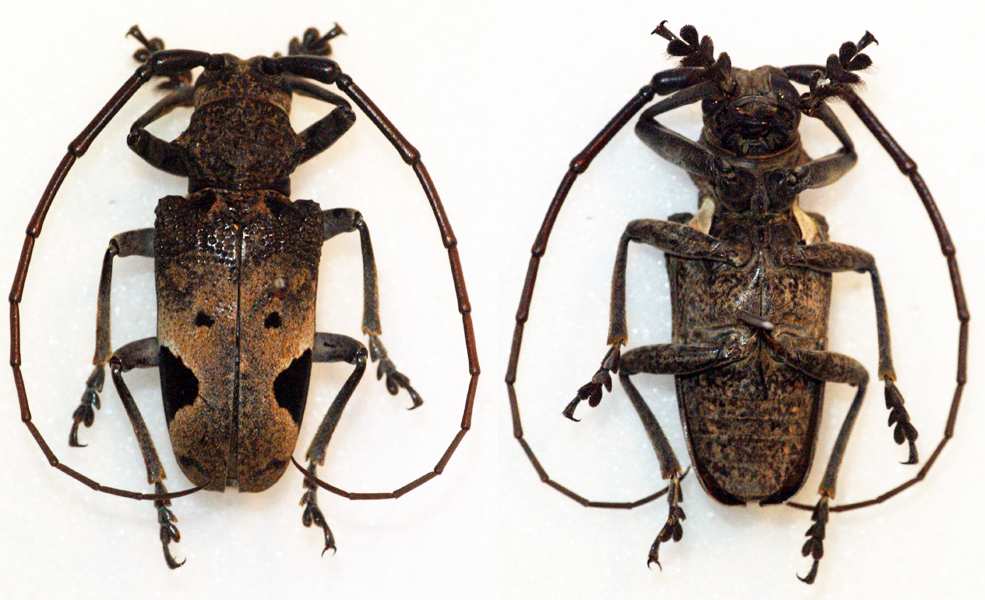

Scientific classification
- Kingdom: Animalia
- Phylum: Arthropoda
- Clade: Pancrustacea
- Class: Insecta
- Order: Coleoptera
- Suborder: Polyphaga
- Infraorder: Cucujiformia
- Family: Cerambycidae
- Genus: Phryneta
- Species: P. leprosa

Binomial name
- Phryneta leprosa (Fabricius, 1775)

Synonyms
- Inesida brunnicornis (Guérin-Méneville) Thomson, 1860; Inesida leprosa (Fabricius) Lacordaire, 1872; Lamia leprosa Fabricius, 1775; Phryneta brunnicornis Guérin-Méneville, 1844

= Phryneta leprosa =

Species of beetle

Phryneta leprosa, the Castilloa borer, is a species of beetle in the family Cerambycidae. It was described by Johan Christian Fabricius in 1775, originally under the genus Lamia. It has a wide distribution throughout Africa. It feeds on Morus alba, Hevea brasiliensis, Coffea arabica, and Chlorophora excelsa.
