= Phryneta pallida =

Scientific classification
- Kingdom: Animalia
- Phylum: Arthropoda
- Clade: Pancrustacea
- Class: Insecta
- Order: Coleoptera
- Suborder: Polyphaga
- Infraorder: Cucujiformia
- Family: Cerambycidae
- Genus: Phryneta
- Species: P. pallida

Binomial name
- Phryneta pallida Thomson, 1857

Species of beetle

Phryneta pallida is a species of beetle in the family Cerambycidae. It was described by James Thomson in 1857. It is known from South Africa.
