= Paraphryneta =

Scientific classification
- Kingdom: Animalia
- Phylum: Arthropoda
- Class: Insecta
- Order: Coleoptera
- Suborder: Polyphaga
- Infraorder: Cucujiformia
- Family: Cerambycidae
- Tribe: Phrynetini
- Genus: Paraphryneta

Genus of beetles

Paraphryneta is a genus of longhorn beetles of the subfamily Lamiinae, containing the following species:

- Paraphryneta allardi Breuning, 1970
- Paraphryneta guttata (Quedenfeldt, 1888)
- Paraphryneta rubeta Breuning, 1947
