= Phryneta histrix =

Scientific classification
- Kingdom: Animalia
- Phylum: Arthropoda
- Clade: Pancrustacea
- Class: Insecta
- Order: Coleoptera
- Suborder: Polyphaga
- Infraorder: Cucujiformia
- Family: Cerambycidae
- Genus: Phryneta
- Species: P. histrix

Binomial name
- Phryneta histrix Hintz, 1913

Species of beetle

Phryneta histrix is a species of beetle in the family Cerambycidae. It was described by Hintz in 1913. It is known from Uganda.
