= Phryneta elobeyana =

Scientific classification
- Kingdom: Animalia
- Phylum: Arthropoda
- Clade: Pancrustacea
- Class: Insecta
- Order: Coleoptera
- Suborder: Polyphaga
- Infraorder: Cucujiformia
- Family: Cerambycidae
- Genus: Phryneta
- Species: P. elobeyana

Binomial name
- Phryneta elobeyana Báguena, 1952

Species of beetle

Phryneta elobeyana is a species of beetle in the family Cerambycidae. It was described by Báguena in 1952. It is known from Equatorial Guinea.
