= Eurysops similis =

Scientific classification
- Kingdom: Animalia
- Phylum: Arthropoda
- Class: Insecta
- Order: Coleoptera
- Suborder: Polyphaga
- Infraorder: Cucujiformia
- Family: Cerambycidae
- Genus: Eurysops
- Species: E. similis

Binomial name
- Eurysops similis Breuning, 1937

Species of beetle

Eurysops similis is a species of beetle in the family Cerambycidae. It was described by Stephan von Breuning in 1937.
