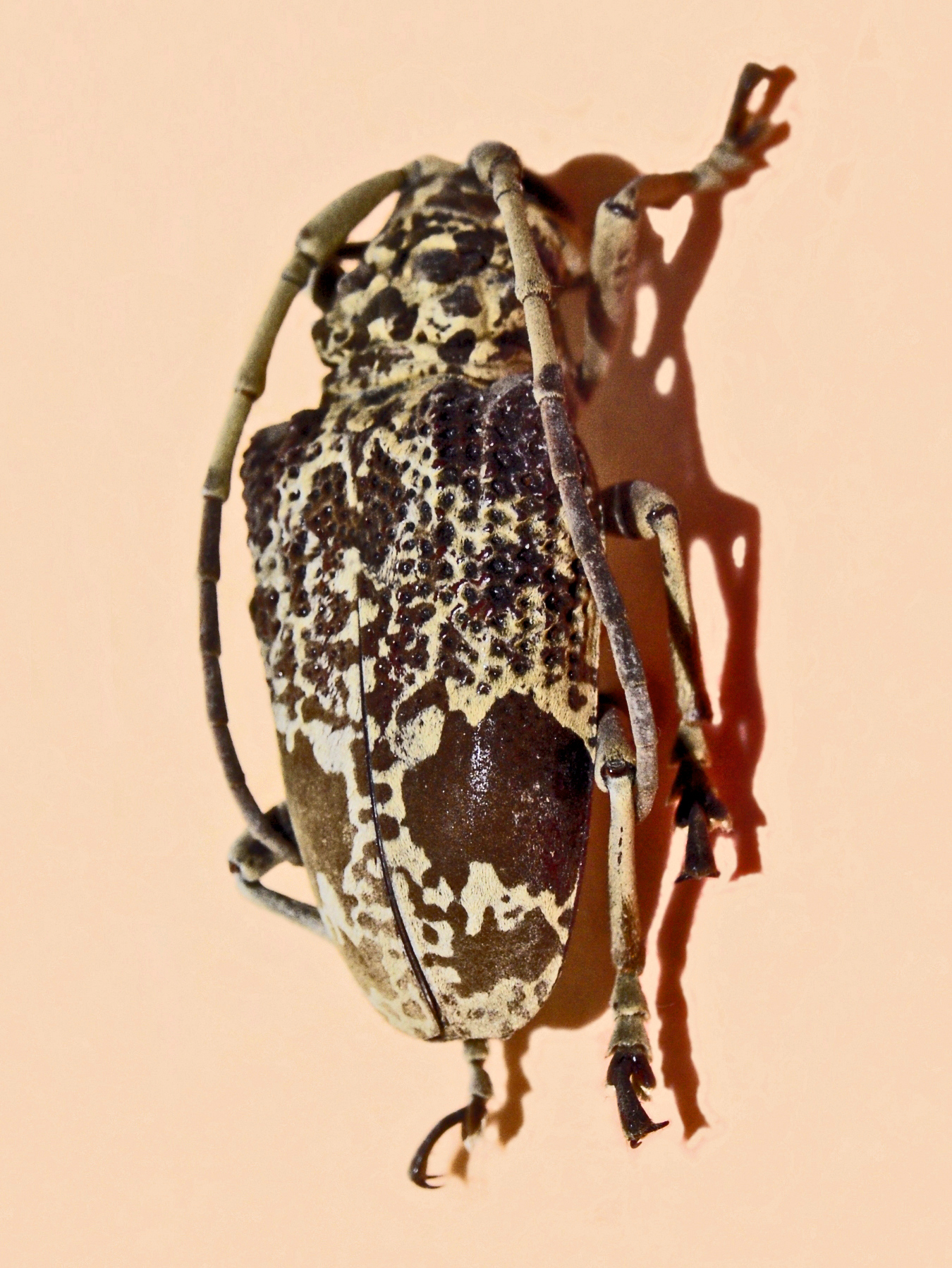
- Museum specimen of Phryneta marmorea

Scientific classification
- Kingdom: Animalia
- Phylum: Arthropoda
- Clade: Pancrustacea
- Class: Insecta
- Order: Coleoptera
- Suborder: Polyphaga
- Infraorder: Cucujiformia
- Family: Cerambycidae
- Genus: Phryneta
- Species: P. marmorea

Binomial name
- Phryneta marmorea (Olivier, 1792)

Synonyms
- Cerambyx marmoreus Olivier, 1792

= Phryneta marmorea =

Species of beetle

Phryneta marmorea is a species of flat-faced longhorn beetles belonging to the family Cerambycidae.

This species can reach a length of about 30 millimetres (1.2 in). It is present in Madagascar.
