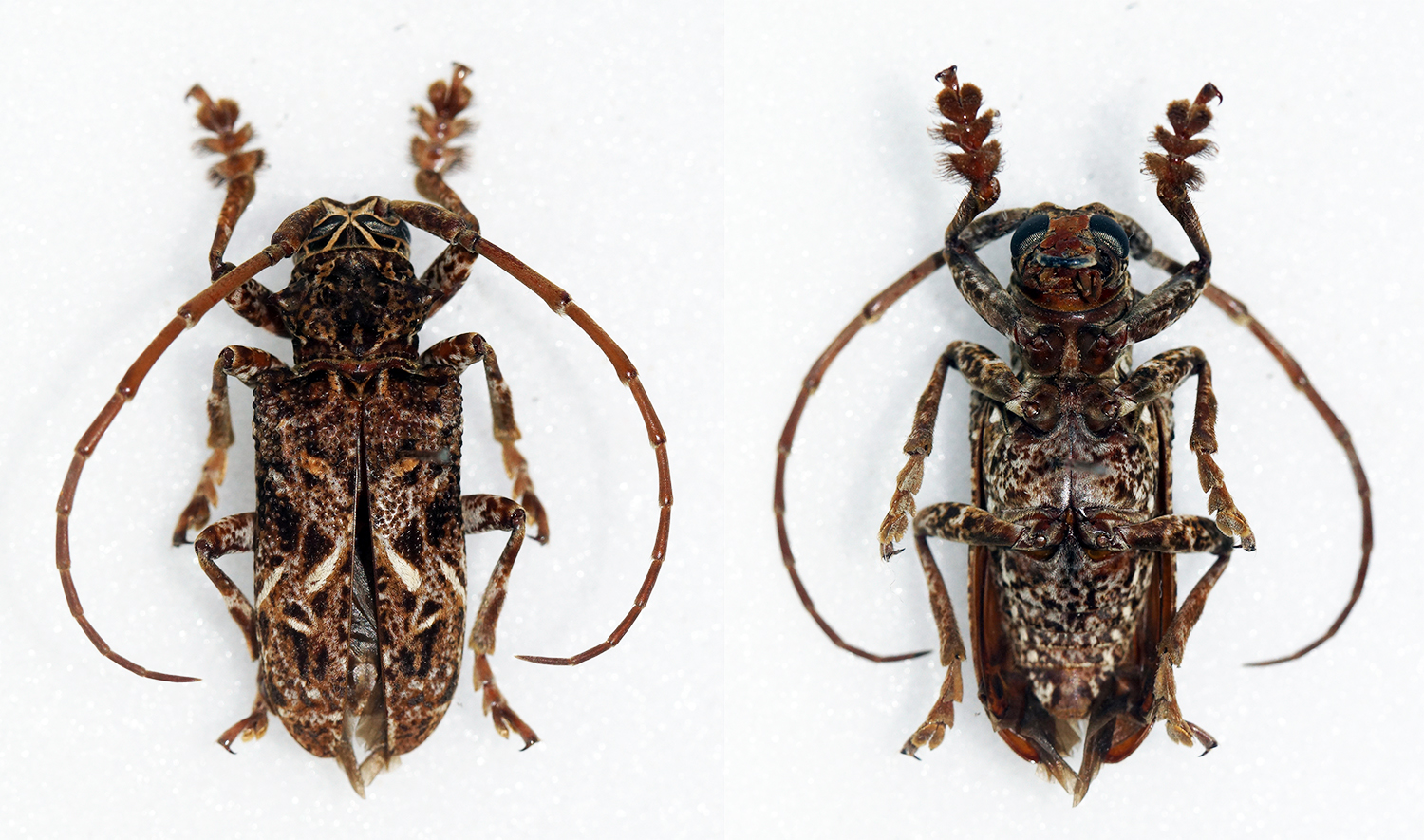
- Phrynetopsis fuscicornis

Scientific classification
- Domain: Eukaryota
- Kingdom: Animalia
- Phylum: Arthropoda
- Class: Insecta
- Order: Coleoptera
- Suborder: Polyphaga
- Infraorder: Cucujiformia
- Family: Cerambycidae
- Tribe: Phrynetini
- Genus: Phrynetopsis

= Phrynetopsis =

Genus of beetles

Phrynetopsis is a genus of longhorn beetles of the subfamily Lamiinae, containing the following species:

- Phrynetopsis fuscicornis (Chevrolat, 1856)
- Phrynetopsis kolbei Gahan, 1909
- Phrynetopsis loveni Aurivillius, 1925
- Phrynetopsis marshalli Breuning, 1935
- Phrynetopsis thomensis Jordan, 1903
- Phrynetopsis trituberculata Kolbe, 1894
- Phrynetopsis variegata (Reiche, 1849)
