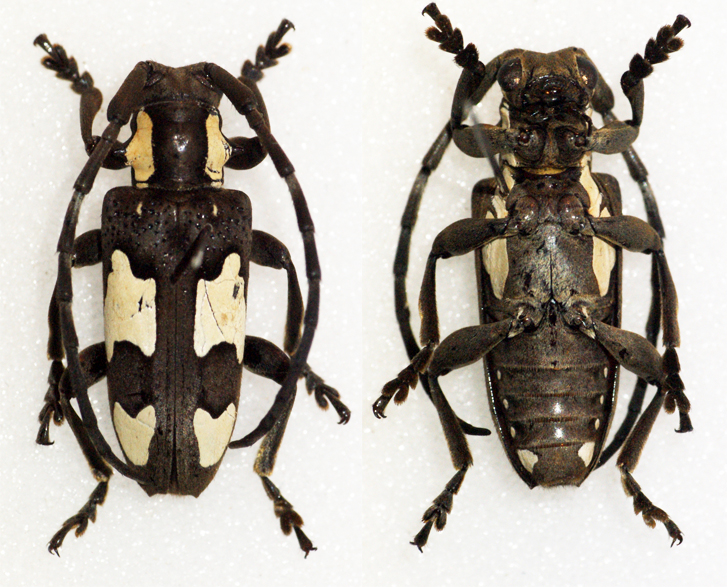
- Mimocalothyrza bottegoi

Scientific classification
- Kingdom: Animalia
- Phylum: Arthropoda
- Class: Insecta
- Order: Coleoptera
- Suborder: Polyphaga
- Infraorder: Cucujiformia
- Family: Cerambycidae
- Genus: Mimocalothyrza
- Species: M. bottegoi

Binomial name
- Mimocalothyrza bottegoi (Gestro, 1895)

Synonyms
- Calothyriza bottegi Gestro, 1895; Paramallonia albosignatoides Breuning, 1986

= Mimocalothyrza bottegoi =

Species of beetle

Mimocalothyrza bottegoi is a species of beetle in the family Cerambycidae. It was described by Gestro in 1895, originally under the genus Calothyriza. It is known from Tanzania, Kenya, Ethiopia, and Somalia.
