= Phrynetopsis loveni =

Scientific classification
- Domain: Eukaryota
- Kingdom: Animalia
- Phylum: Arthropoda
- Class: Insecta
- Order: Coleoptera
- Suborder: Polyphaga
- Infraorder: Cucujiformia
- Family: Cerambycidae
- Genus: Phrynetopsis
- Species: P. loveni

Binomial name
- Phrynetopsis loveni Aurivillius, 1925

Species of beetle

Phrynetopsis loveni is a species of beetle in the family Cerambycidae. It was described by Per Olof Christopher Aurivillius in 1925. It was described by Tanzania, Kenya, and Uganda.
