= Phryneta conradti =

Scientific classification
- Kingdom: Animalia
- Phylum: Arthropoda
- Clade: Pancrustacea
- Class: Insecta
- Order: Coleoptera
- Suborder: Polyphaga
- Infraorder: Cucujiformia
- Family: Cerambycidae
- Genus: Phryneta
- Species: P. conradti

Binomial name
- Phryneta conradti Kolbe, 1894

Species of beetle

Phryneta conradti is a species of beetle in the family Cerambycidae. It was described by Hermann Julius Kolbe in 1894. It is known in the Democratic Republic of the Congo, Tanzania and Malawi.
