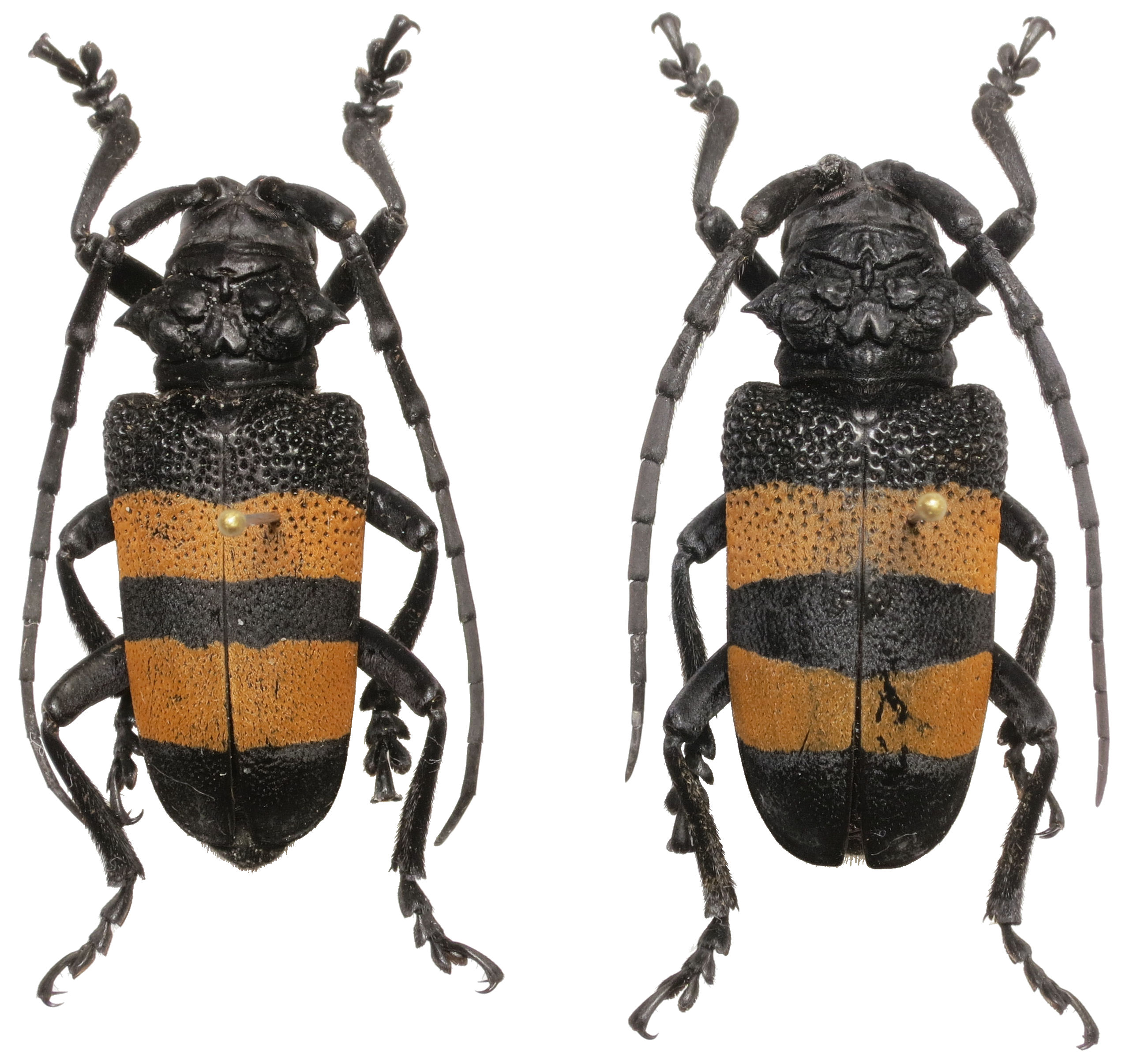
- From Togo

Scientific classification
- Kingdom: Animalia
- Phylum: Arthropoda
- Clade: Pancrustacea
- Class: Insecta
- Order: Coleoptera
- Suborder: Polyphaga
- Infraorder: Cucujiformia
- Family: Cerambycidae
- Genus: Phryneta
- Species: P. aurocincta

Binomial name
- Phryneta aurocincta (Guérin-Méneville, 1832)

Synonyms
- Lamia aurocincta Guérin-Méneville, 1831

= Phryneta aurocincta =

Species of beetle

Phryneta aurocincta is a species of beetle in the family Cerambycidae. It was described by Félix Édouard Guérin-Méneville in 1832, originally under the genus Lamia. It has a wide distribution throughout Africa.

== Varieties ==
- Phryneta aurocincta var. cingulata Aurivillius, 1924
- Phryneta aurocincta var. favareli Achard, 1913
