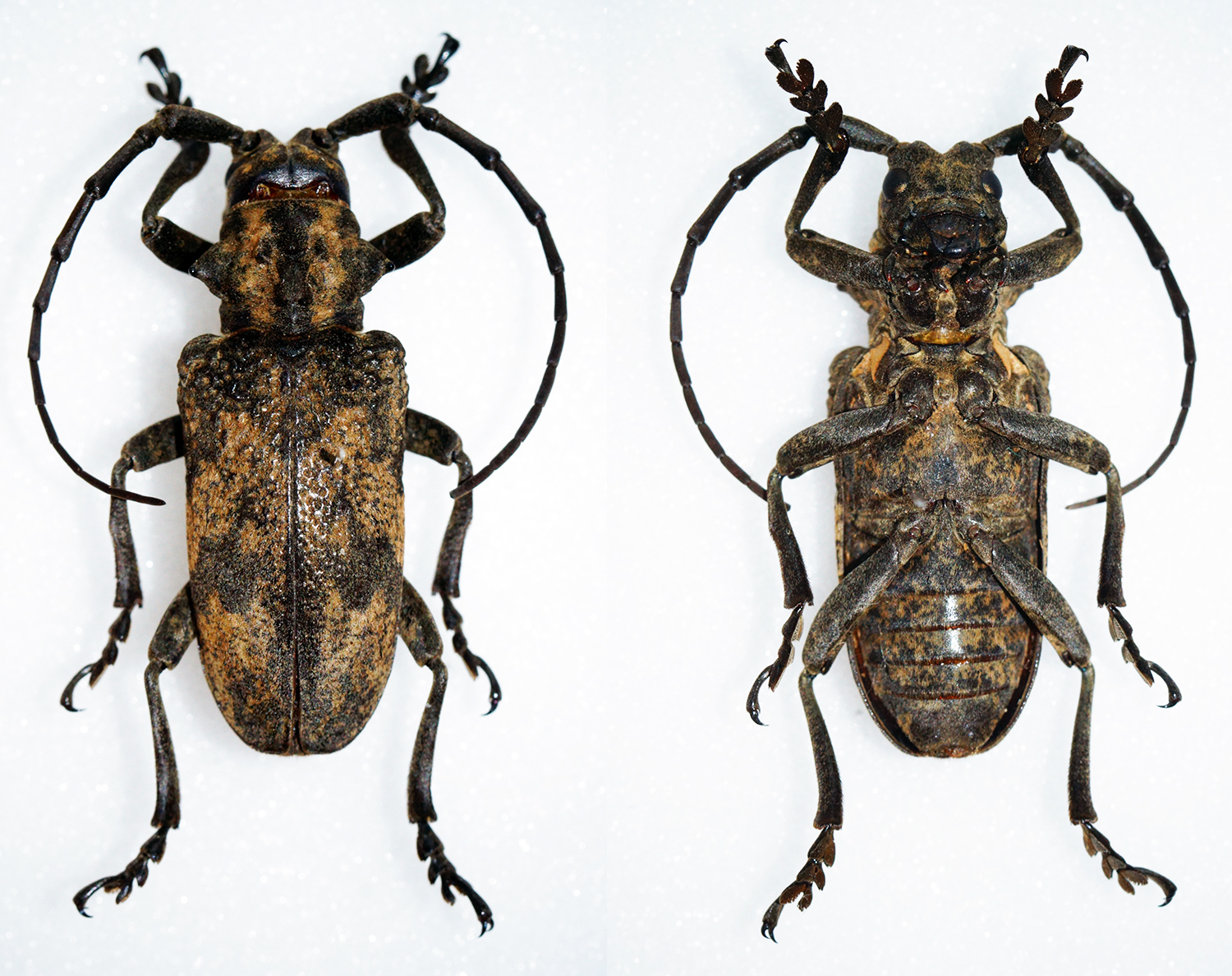

Scientific classification
- Kingdom: Animalia
- Phylum: Arthropoda
- Clade: Pancrustacea
- Class: Insecta
- Order: Coleoptera
- Suborder: Polyphaga
- Infraorder: Cucujiformia
- Family: Cerambycidae
- Genus: Phryneta
- Species: P. obesa

Binomial name
- Phryneta obesa (Westwood, 1845)

Synonyms
- Chreostes argenteus Hintz, 1913; Chreostes cinerascens Peringuey, 1892; Chreostes fuscovariegatus Aurivillius, 1911; Chreostes gahani Waterhouse, 1898; Chreostes obesus (Westwood, 1845); Lamia obesa Westwood, 1845 nec Voet, 1778; Chreostes obesa (Westwood, 1845) (misspelling); Phryneta dregei Dejean, 1833 (nomen nudum)

= Phryneta obesa =

Species of beetle

Phryneta obesa is a species of beetle in the family Cerambycidae. It was described by John O. Westwood in 1845. It has a wide distribution in Africa.
