= Phryneta ephippiata =

Scientific classification
- Kingdom: Animalia
- Phylum: Arthropoda
- Clade: Pancrustacea
- Class: Insecta
- Order: Coleoptera
- Suborder: Polyphaga
- Infraorder: Cucujiformia
- Family: Cerambycidae
- Genus: Phryneta
- Species: P. ephippiata

Binomial name
- Phryneta ephippiata (Pascoe, 1864)

Synonyms
- Chreostes ephippiatus Pascoe, 1864

Species of beetle

Phryneta ephippiata is a species of beetle in the family Cerambycidae. It was described by Francis Polkinghorne Pascoe in 1864. It is known from South Africa and Namibia.
