= Phryneta luctuosa =

Scientific classification
- Kingdom: Animalia
- Phylum: Arthropoda
- Clade: Pancrustacea
- Class: Insecta
- Order: Coleoptera
- Suborder: Polyphaga
- Infraorder: Cucujiformia
- Family: Cerambycidae
- Genus: Phryneta
- Species: P. luctuosa

Binomial name
- Phryneta luctuosa (Murray, 1870)

Synonyms
- Phryneta nigropilosa Aurivillius, 1886; Phryneta nigrosignata Quedenfeldt, 1887

Species of beetle

Phryneta luctuosa is a species of beetle in the family Cerambycidae, also called lamiines or flat-faced longhorned beetles. It was described by Murray in 1870. It is known from Cameroon and Nigeria.
