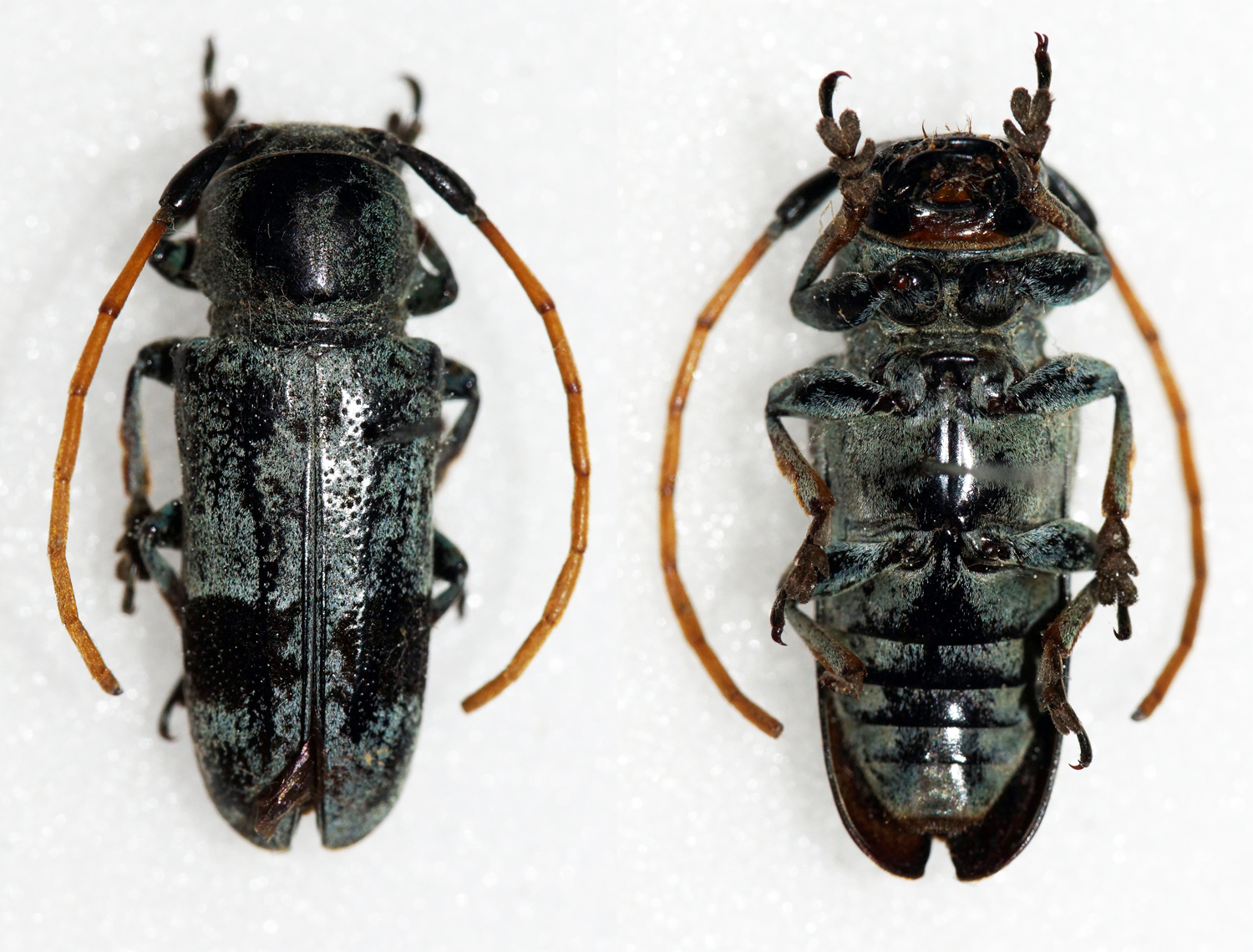

Scientific classification
- Kingdom: Animalia
- Phylum: Arthropoda
- Clade: Pancrustacea
- Class: Insecta
- Order: Coleoptera
- Suborder: Polyphaga
- Infraorder: Cucujiformia
- Family: Cerambycidae
- Genus: Phryneta
- Species: P. macularis

Binomial name
- Phryneta macularis Harold, 1879

Synonyms
- Phryneta macularis m. fuliginosa Teocchi, Jiroux & Sudre, 2004

= Phryneta macularis =

Species of beetle

Phryneta macularis is a species of beetle in the family Cerambycidae. It was described by Harold in 1879. It is known from the Democratic Republic of the Congo and Angola.
