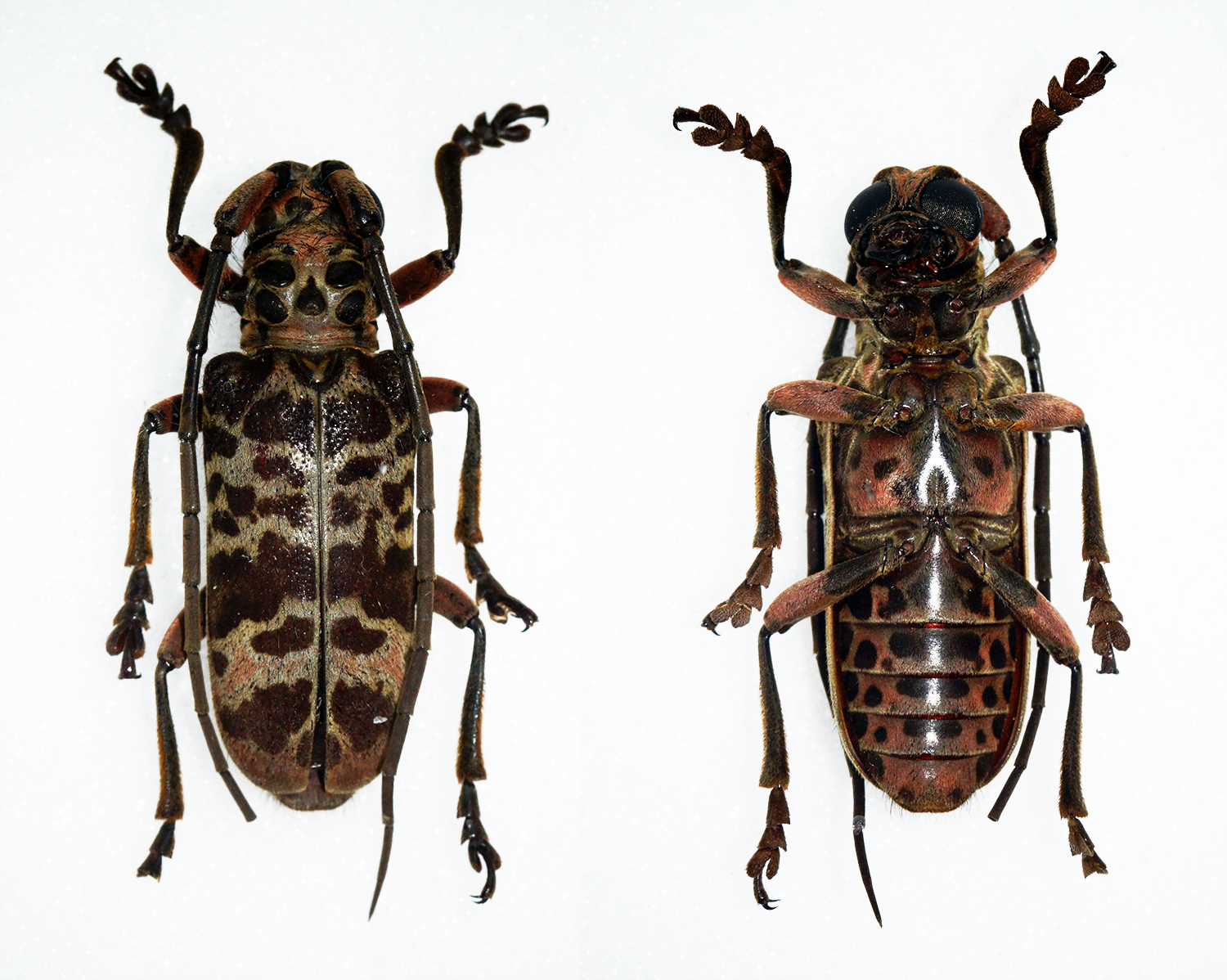
- Eurysops esau

Scientific classification
- Domain: Eukaryota
- Kingdom: Animalia
- Phylum: Arthropoda
- Class: Insecta
- Order: Coleoptera
- Suborder: Polyphaga
- Infraorder: Cucujiformia
- Family: Cerambycidae
- Tribe: Phrynetini
- Genus: Eurysops

= Eurysops =

Genus of beetles

Eurysops is a genus of longhorn beetles of the subfamily Lamiinae, containing the following species:

- Eurysops burgeoni Breuning, 1935
- Eurysops esau Chevrolat, 1855
- Eurysops insignis Aurivillius, 1910
- Eurysops similis Breuning, 1937
