= Phryneta ellioti =

Scientific classification
- Kingdom: Animalia
- Phylum: Arthropoda
- Clade: Pancrustacea
- Class: Insecta
- Order: Coleoptera
- Suborder: Polyphaga
- Infraorder: Cucujiformia
- Family: Cerambycidae
- Genus: Phryneta
- Species: P. ellioti

Binomial name
- Phryneta ellioti (Gahan, 1909)

Synonyms
- Phrystola ellioti Gahan, 1909

Species of beetle

Phryneta ellioti is a species of beetle in the family Cerambycidae. It was described by Charles Joseph Gahan in 1909. It is known from Uganda and the Democratic Republic of the Congo.
