= Pseudhomelix =

Scientific classification
- Kingdom: Animalia
- Phylum: Arthropoda
- Class: Insecta
- Order: Coleoptera
- Suborder: Polyphaga
- Infraorder: Cucujiformia
- Family: Cerambycidae
- Genus: Pseudhomelix
- Species: P. ornata

Binomial name
- Pseudhomelix ornata (Quedenfeldt, 1855)

Genus of beetles

Pseudhomelix ornata is a species of beetle in the family Cerambycidae, and the only species in the genus Pseudhomelix. It was described by Quedenfeldt in 1855.
