= Paromelix =

Scientific classification
- Kingdom: Animalia
- Phylum: Arthropoda
- Class: Insecta
- Order: Coleoptera
- Suborder: Polyphaga
- Infraorder: Cucujiformia
- Family: Cerambycidae
- Genus: Paromelix
- Species: P. unicolor

Binomial name
- Paromelix unicolor (Quedenfeldt, 1883)

Genus of beetles

Paromelix unicolor is a species of beetle in the family Cerambycidae, and the only species in the genus Paromelix. It was described by Quedenfeldt in 1883.
