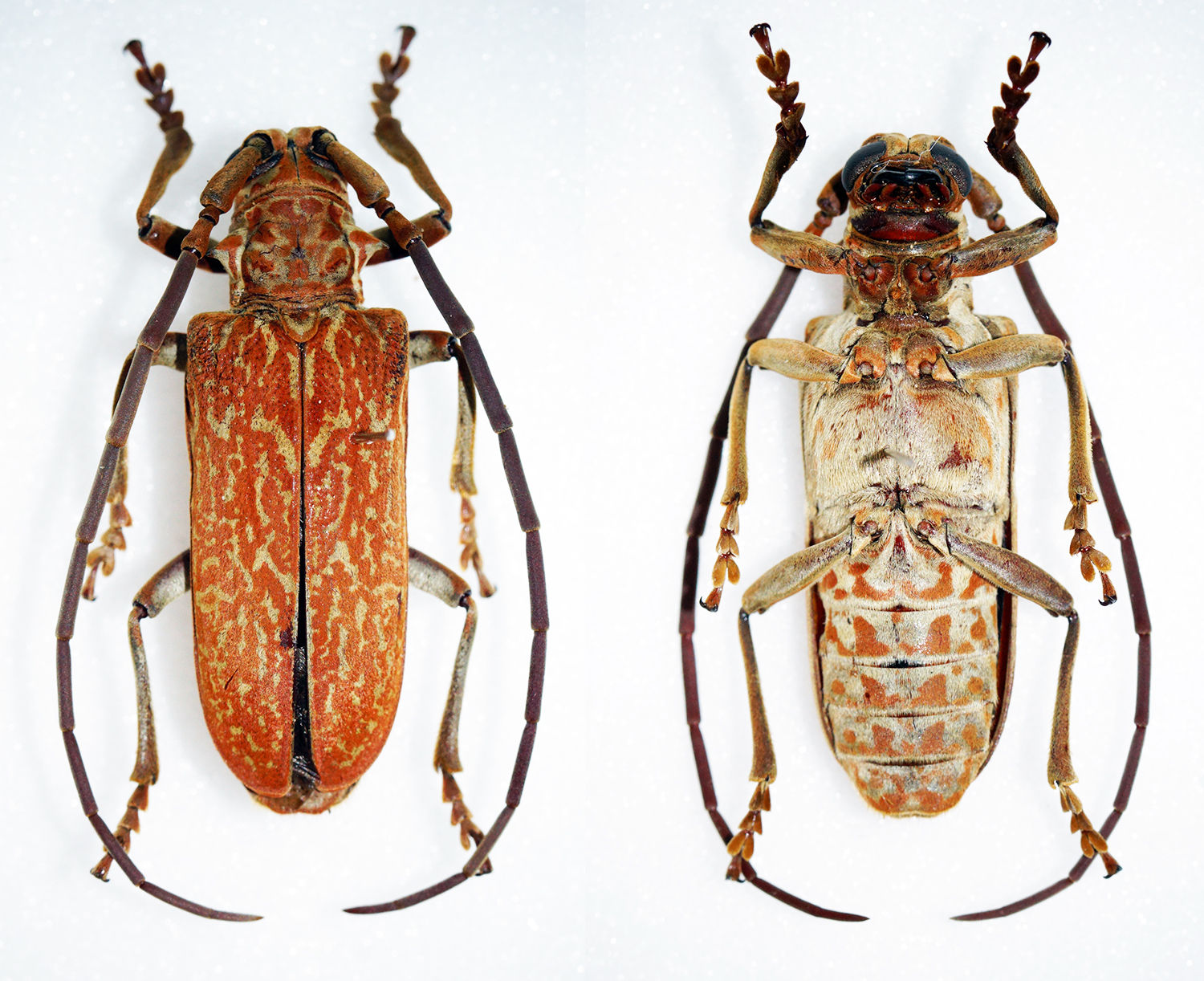

Scientific classification
- Kingdom: Animalia
- Phylum: Arthropoda
- Class: Insecta
- Order: Coleoptera
- Suborder: Polyphaga
- Infraorder: Cucujiformia
- Family: Cerambycidae
- Genus: Brachytritus
- Species: B. hieroglyphicus

Binomial name
- Brachytritus hieroglyphicus Quedenfeldt, 1882

= Brachytritus =

Genus of beetles

Brachytritus hieroglyphicus is a species of beetle in the family Cerambycidae, and the only species in the genus Brachytritus. It was described by Quedenfeldt in 1882.
