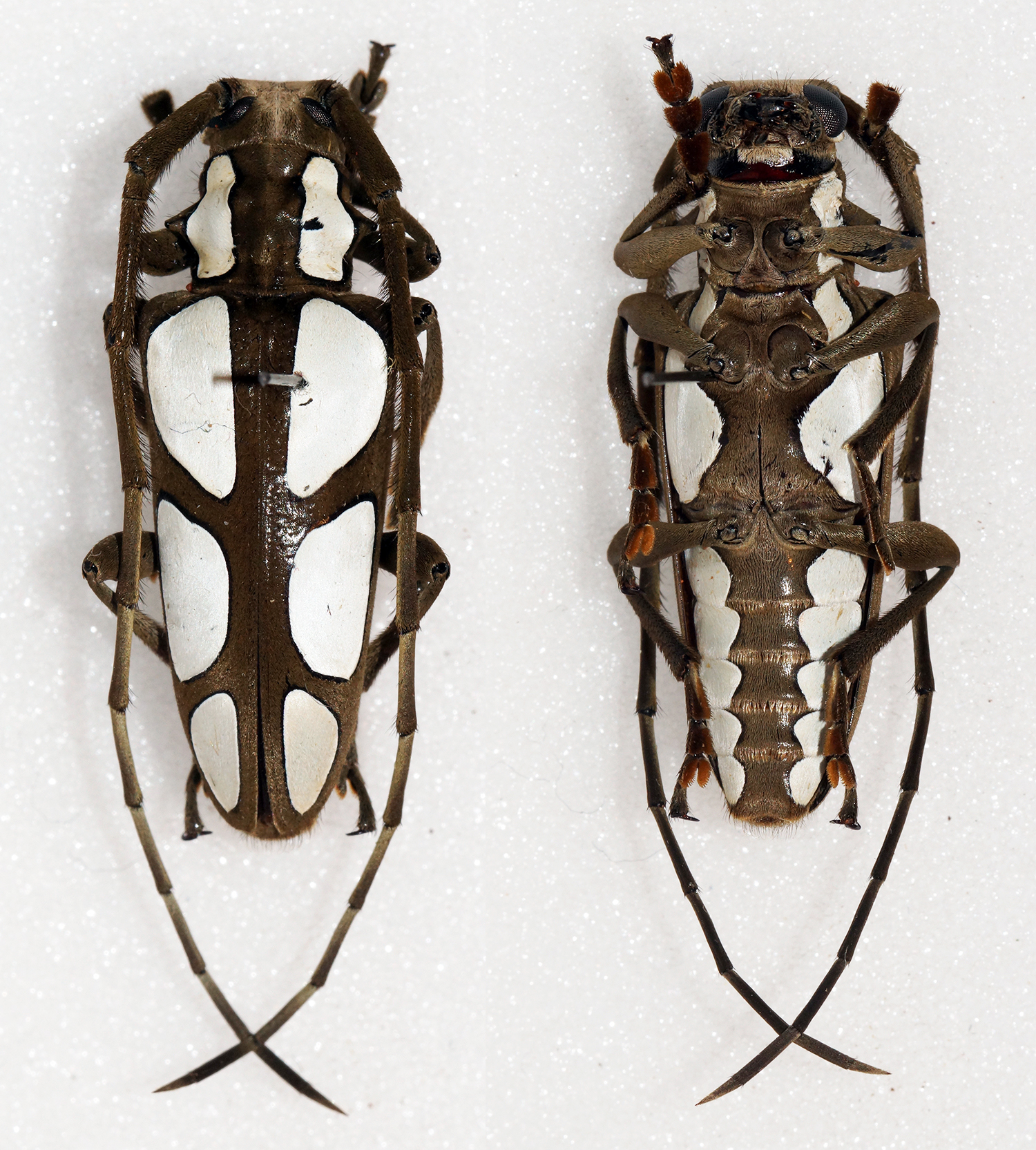
- Calothyrza pauli

Scientific classification
- Kingdom: Animalia
- Phylum: Arthropoda
- Class: Insecta
- Order: Coleoptera
- Suborder: Polyphaga
- Infraorder: Cucujiformia
- Family: Cerambycidae
- Subfamily: Lamiinae
- Genus: Calothyrza

= Calothyrza =

Genus of beetles

Calothyrza is a genus of longhorn beetles of the subfamily Lamiinae, containing the following species:

- Calothyrza jardinei (White, 1858)
- Calothyrza margaritifera (Westwood, 1848)
- Calothyrza pauli (Fairmaire, 1884)
- Calothyrza sehestedti (Fabricius, 1798)
