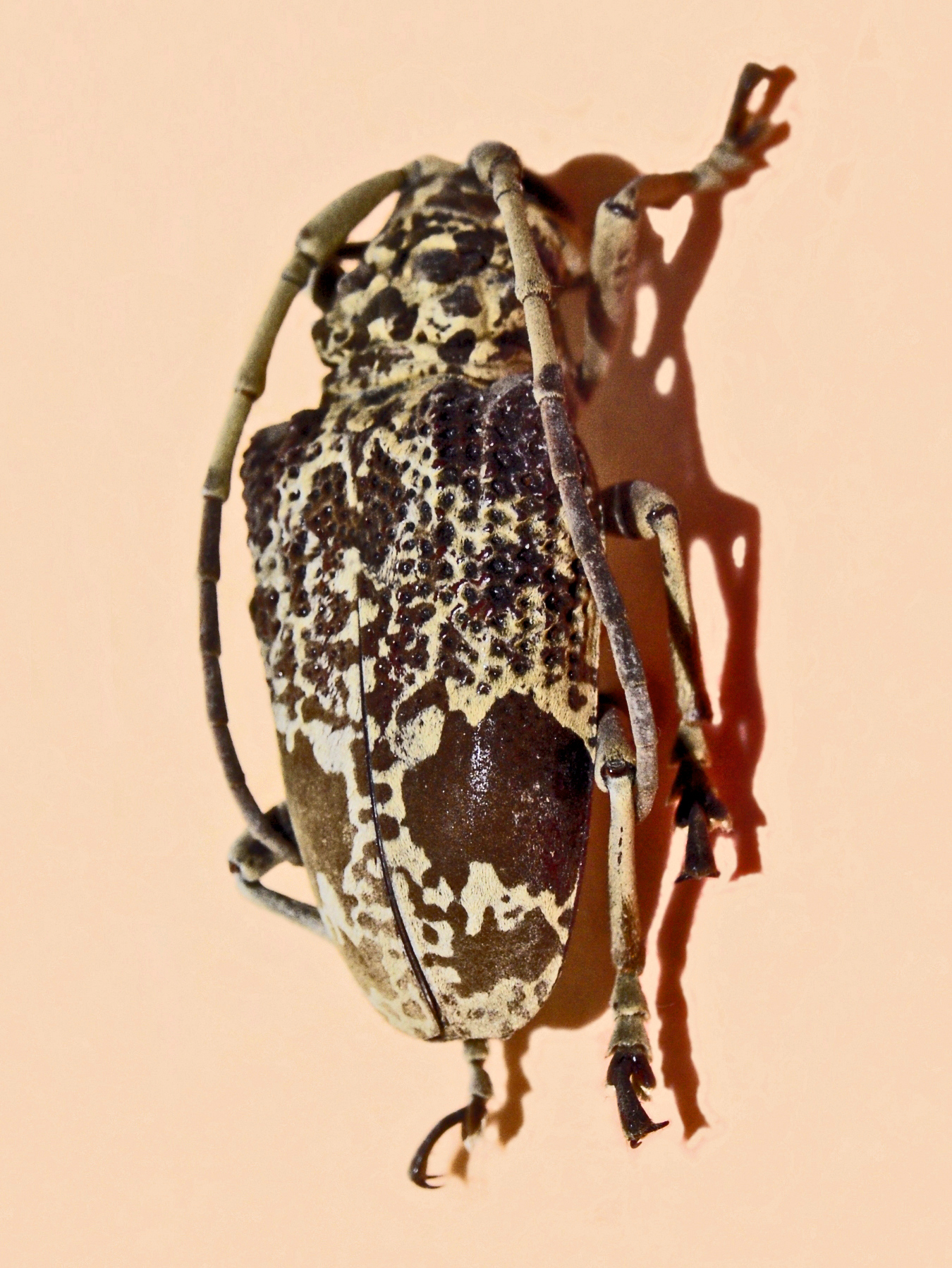
- Museum specimen of Phryneta marmorea

Scientific classification
- Kingdom: Animalia
- Phylum: Arthropoda
- Class: Insecta
- Order: Coleoptera
- Suborder: Polyphaga
- Infraorder: Cucujiformia
- Family: Cerambycidae
- Tribe: Phrynetini
- Genus: Phryneta; Dejean, 1835

Synonyms
- Chreostes Pascoe, 1864; Inesida Thomson, 1860; Phrystola Murray, 1870; Praomera Pascoe, 1864

= Phryneta =

Genus of beetles

Phryneta is a genus of flat-faced longhorn beetles belonging to the family Cerambycidae.

== Species ==
- Phryneta asmarensis Breuning, 1969
- Phryneta atricornis Fairmaire, 1893
- Phryneta aurivillii Hintz, 1913
- Phryneta aurocincta (Guérin-Méneville, 1832)
- Phryneta bulbifera (Kolbe, 1894)
- Phryneta coeca Chevrolat, 1857
- Phryneta conradti Kolbe, 1894
- Phryneta crassa Jordan, 1903
- Phryneta densepilosa Breuning, 1973
- Phryneta ellioti (Gahan, 1909)
- Phryneta elobeyana Báguena, 1952
- Phryneta ephippiata (Pascoe, 1864)
- Phryneta escalerai Báguena & Breuning, 1958
- Phryneta flavescens Breuning, 1954
- Phryneta hecphora Thomson, 1857
- Phryneta histrix Hintz, 1913
- Phryneta immaculata Hintz, 1911
- Phryneta leprosa (Fabricius, 1775) - Castilloa Borer
- Phryneta luctuosa (Murray, 1870)
- Phryneta macularis Harold, 1879
- Phryneta marmorea (Olivier, 1792)
- Phryneta obesa (Westwood, 1845)
- Phryneta obliquata (Harold, 1878)
- Phryneta pallida Thomson, 1857
- Phryneta pulchra Tippmann, 1958
- Phryneta rufa Breuning, 1954
- Phryneta semirasa Dohrn, 1885
- Phryneta silacea Aurivillius, 1907
- Phryneta spinator (Fabricius, 1792) - Fig-tree Borer Longhorn Beetle
- Phryneta verrucosa (Drury, 1773)
