= Elytroleptus metallicus =

Scientific classification
- Kingdom: Animalia
- Phylum: Arthropoda
- Class: Insecta
- Order: Coleoptera
- Suborder: Polyphaga
- Infraorder: Cucujiformia
- Family: Cerambycidae
- Genus: Elytroleptus
- Species: E. metallicus

Binomial name
- Elytroleptus metallicus (Nonfried, 1894)

Species of beetle

Elytroleptus metallicus is a species of beetle in the family Cerambycidae. It was described by Nonfried in 1894.
