= BATUS =

BATUS may refer to:

- BATUS Inc., subsidiary of British American Tobacco
- British Army Training Unit Suffield
- Batus (beetle), a genus of beetles
