= Elytroleptus similis =

Scientific classification
- Domain: Eukaryota
- Kingdom: Animalia
- Phylum: Arthropoda
- Class: Insecta
- Order: Coleoptera
- Suborder: Polyphaga
- Infraorder: Cucujiformia
- Family: Cerambycidae
- Genus: Elytroleptus
- Species: E. similis

Binomial name
- Elytroleptus similis (Chemsak & Linsley, 1965)

Species of beetle

Elytroleptus similis is a species of beetle in the family Cerambycidae. It was described by Chemsak & Linsley in 1965.
