= Elytroleptus immaculipennis =

Scientific classification
- Domain: Eukaryota
- Kingdom: Animalia
- Phylum: Arthropoda
- Class: Insecta
- Order: Coleoptera
- Suborder: Polyphaga
- Infraorder: Cucujiformia
- Family: Cerambycidae
- Genus: Elytroleptus
- Species: E. immaculipennis

Binomial name
- Elytroleptus immaculipennis Knull, 1935

Species of beetle

Elytroleptus immaculipennis is a species of beetle in the family Cerambycidae. It was described by Knull in 1935.
