= Aridaeus sumbaensis =

Scientific classification
- Kingdom: Animalia
- Phylum: Arthropoda
- Class: Insecta
- Order: Coleoptera
- Suborder: Polyphaga
- Infraorder: Cucujiformia
- Family: Cerambycidae
- Genus: Aridaeus
- Species: A. sumbaensis

Binomial name
- Aridaeus sumbaensis Gérard Chemin and Francesco Vitali, 2013

Indonesian longhorn beetle species

Aridaeus sumbaensis is a species of longhorn beetle belonging to the family Cerambycidae that is found in Indonesia. It was first documented by Gérard Chemin and Francesco Vitali in 2013.

== Description ==
The male holotype is 17 mm (0.66 in) in length, with an orange and black body covered in golden pubescence. The elytra and legs are orange, except for a distinctive black median strip. The head of Aridaeus sumbaensis is fully orange, featuring bicolored mandibles with and orange base and black tips.
