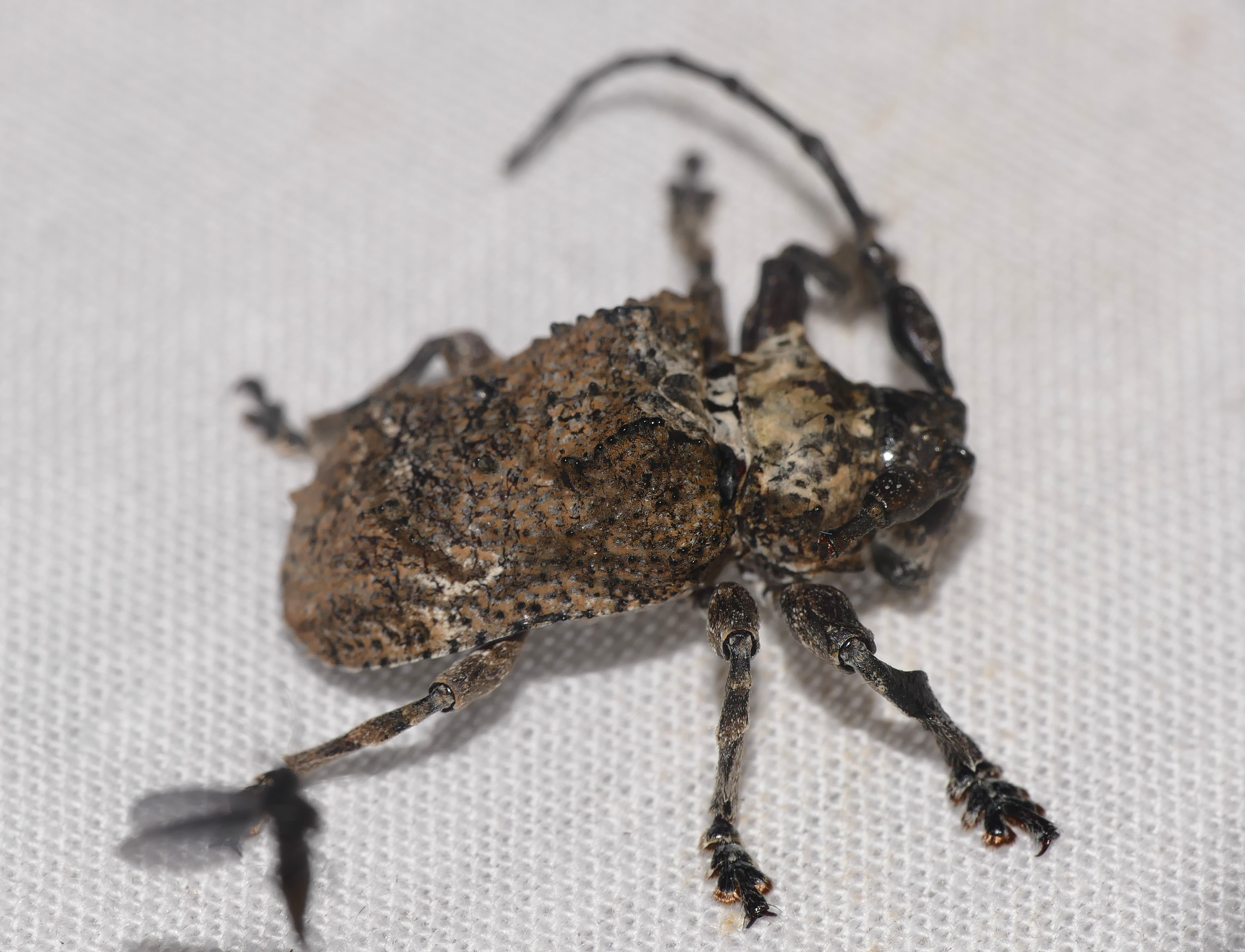

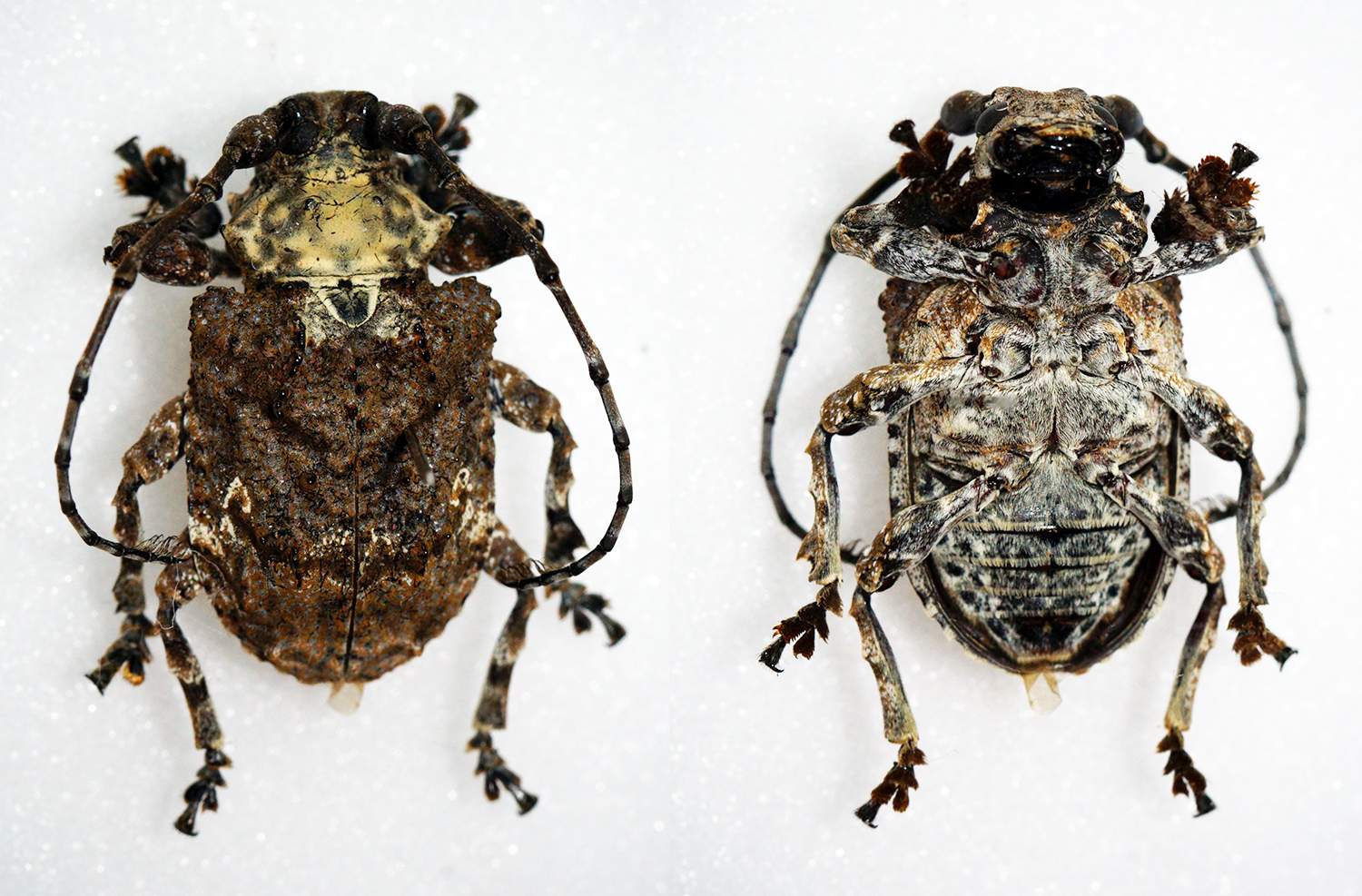
- Onychocerus scorpio

Scientific classification
- Domain: Eukaryota
- Kingdom: Animalia
- Phylum: Arthropoda
- Class: Insecta
- Order: Coleoptera
- Suborder: Polyphaga
- Infraorder: Cucujiformia
- Family: Cerambycidae
- Genus: Onychocerus

= Onychocerus =

Genus of beetles

Onychocerus, from Ancient Greek ὄνυχος (ónukhos), meaning "claw", and κέρας (kéras), meaning "horn", is a Neotropical genus of beetles in the family Cerambycidae, containing the following species:

- Onychocerus aculeicornis (Kirby, 1818)
- Onychocerus albitarsis Pascoe, 1859
- Onychocerus ampliatus Bates, 1875
- Onychocerus concentricus Bates, 1862
- Onychocerus giesberti Júlio & Monné, 2001
- Onychocerus hovorei Júlio & Monné, 2001
- Onychocerus scorpio (Fabricius, 1781)
- Onychocerus versutus (Lane, 1966)
