= Elytroleptus limpianus =

Scientific classification
- Domain: Eukaryota
- Kingdom: Animalia
- Phylum: Arthropoda
- Class: Insecta
- Order: Coleoptera
- Suborder: Polyphaga
- Infraorder: Cucujiformia
- Family: Cerambycidae
- Genus: Elytroleptus
- Species: E. limpianus

Binomial name
- Elytroleptus limpianus Skiles & Chemsak, 1982

Species of beetle

Elytroleptus limpianus is a species of beetle in the family Cerambycidae. It was described by Skiles & Chemsak in 1982.
