= Elytroleptus peninsularis =

Scientific classification
- Domain: Eukaryota
- Kingdom: Animalia
- Phylum: Arthropoda
- Class: Insecta
- Order: Coleoptera
- Suborder: Polyphaga
- Infraorder: Cucujiformia
- Family: Cerambycidae
- Genus: Elytroleptus
- Species: E. peninsularis

Binomial name
- Elytroleptus peninsularis Hovore, 1988

Species of beetle

Elytroleptus peninsularis is a species of beetle in the family Cerambycidae. It was described by Hovore in 1988.
