= Onychocerus hovorei =

Scientific classification
- Domain: Eukaryota
- Kingdom: Animalia
- Phylum: Arthropoda
- Class: Insecta
- Order: Coleoptera
- Suborder: Polyphaga
- Infraorder: Cucujiformia
- Family: Cerambycidae
- Genus: Onychocerus
- Species: O. hovorei

Binomial name
- Onychocerus hovorei Júlio & Monné, 2001

Species of beetle

Onychocerus hovorei is a species of beetle in the family Cerambycidae. It was described by Júlio and Monné in 2001.
