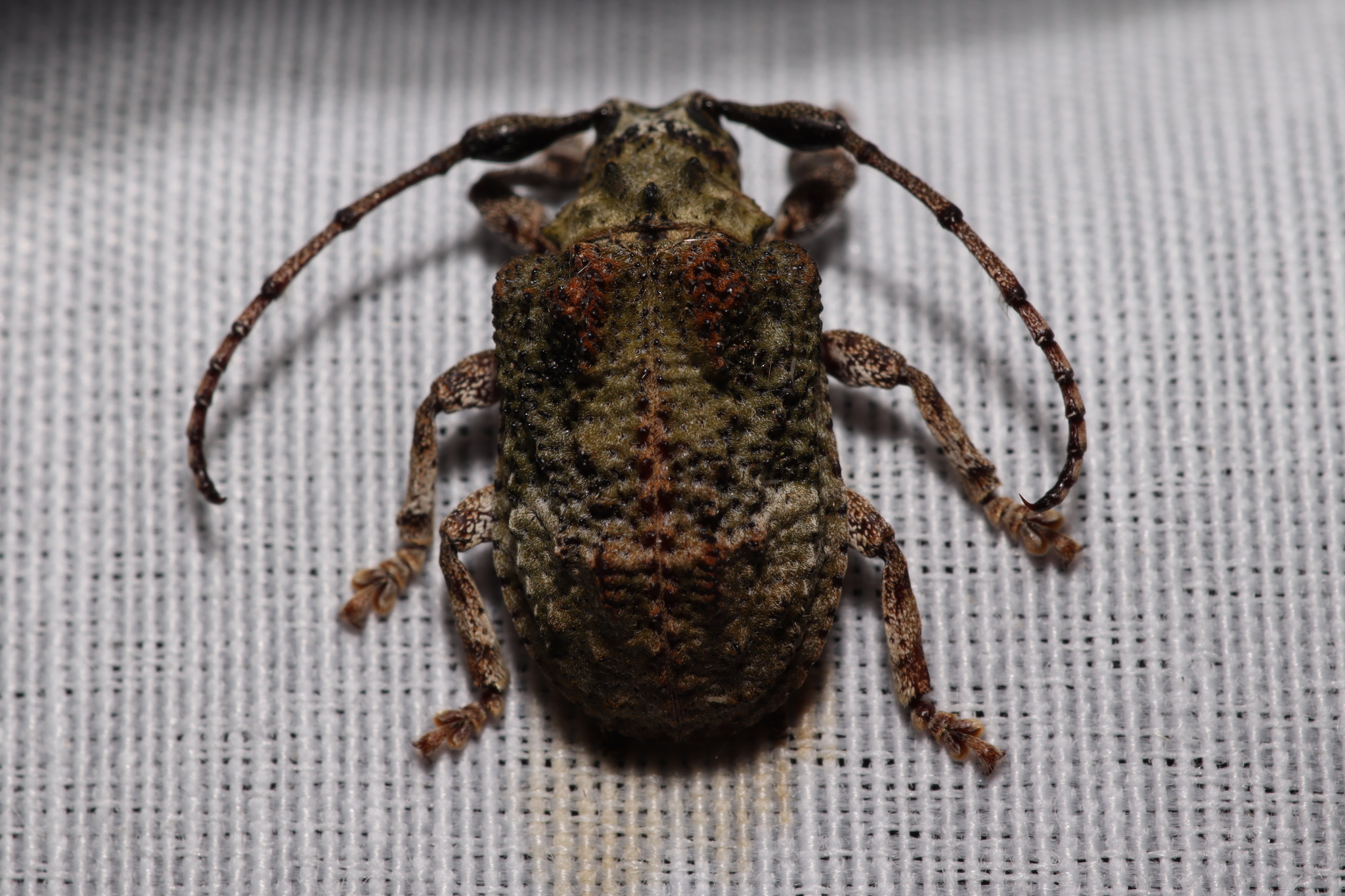
- A specimen of Onchocerus aculeicornis.

Scientific classification
- Domain: Eukaryota
- Kingdom: Animalia
- Phylum: Arthropoda
- Class: Insecta
- Order: Coleoptera
- Suborder: Polyphaga
- Infraorder: Cucujiformia
- Family: Cerambycidae
- Genus: Onychocerus
- Species: O. aculeicornis

Binomial name
- Onychocerus aculeicornis (Kirby, 1818)

= Onychocerus aculeicornis =

Species of beetle

Onychocerus aculeicornis is a species of beetle in the family Cerambycidae. It was described by William Kirby in 1818.
