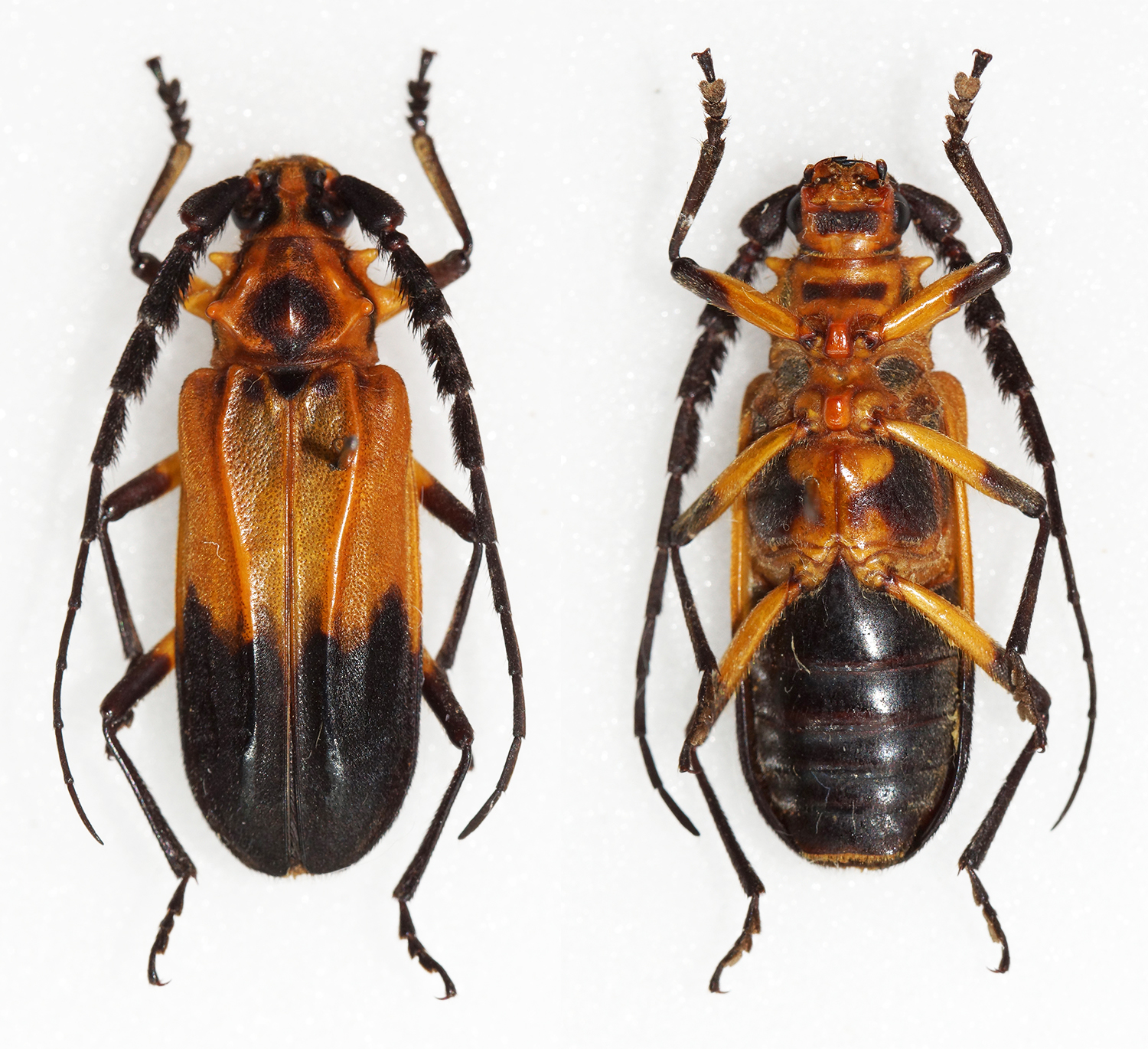

Scientific classification
- Kingdom: Animalia
- Phylum: Arthropoda
- Class: Insecta
- Order: Coleoptera
- Suborder: Polyphaga
- Infraorder: Cucujiformia
- Family: Cerambycidae
- Genus: Batus
- Species: B. hirticornis

Binomial name
- Batus hirticornis (Gyllenhal, 1817)

= Batus hirticornis =

Species of beetle

Batus hirticornis is a species of beetle in the family Cerambycidae. It was described by Gyllenhal in 1817.
