= Onychocerus concentricus =

Scientific classification
- Domain: Eukaryota
- Kingdom: Animalia
- Phylum: Arthropoda
- Class: Insecta
- Order: Coleoptera
- Suborder: Polyphaga
- Infraorder: Cucujiformia
- Family: Cerambycidae
- Genus: Onychocerus
- Species: O. concentricus

Binomial name
- Onychocerus concentricus Bates, 1862

Species of beetle

Onychocerus concentricus is a species of beetle in the family Cerambycidae. It was described by Bates in 1862.
