= Onychocerus scorpio =

Scientific classification
- Kingdom: Animalia
- Phylum: Arthropoda
- Class: Insecta
- Order: Coleoptera
- Suborder: Polyphaga
- Infraorder: Cucujiformia
- Family: Cerambycidae
- Genus: Onychocerus
- Species: O. scorpio

Binomial name
- Onychocerus scorpio (Fabricius, 1781)

Synonyms
- Cerambyx crassus Voet, 1778 (nomen nudum); Cerambyx scorpio Fabricius, 1781

Species of beetle

Onychocerus scorpio is a species of beetle in the family Cerambycidae. It was described by Fabricius in 1781.
