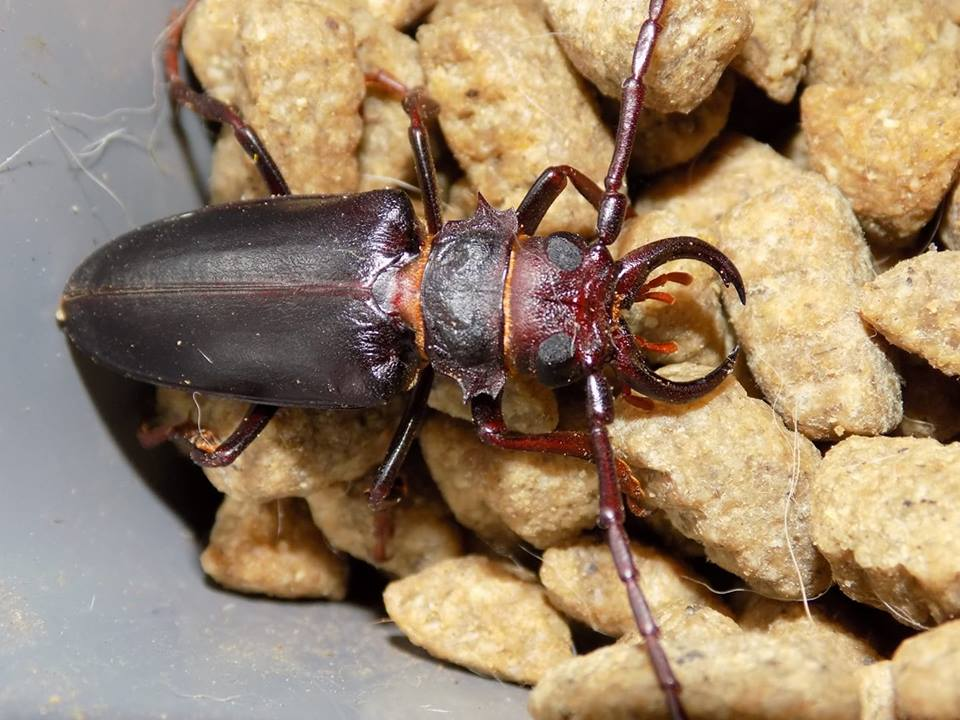
- Cacosceles oedipus

Scientific classification
- Domain: Eukaryota
- Kingdom: Animalia
- Phylum: Arthropoda
- Class: Insecta
- Order: Coleoptera
- Suborder: Polyphaga
- Infraorder: Cucujiformia
- Family: Cerambycidae
- Subfamily: Prioninae
- Tribe: Cacoscelini
- Genus: Cacosceles; Newman, 1838

Synonyms
- Pithanotes Newman 1840

= Cacosceles =

Genus of beetles

Cacosceles is a genus of beetles belonging to the family Cerambycidae.

The species of this genus are found in southern Africa.

== Species ==
The following species are recognised in the genus Cacosceles:

- Cacosceles gracilis Lackerbeck, 2000
- Cacosceles latus Waterhouse, 1881
- Cacosceles newmannii (Thomson, 1877)
- Cacosceles oedipus Newman, 1838

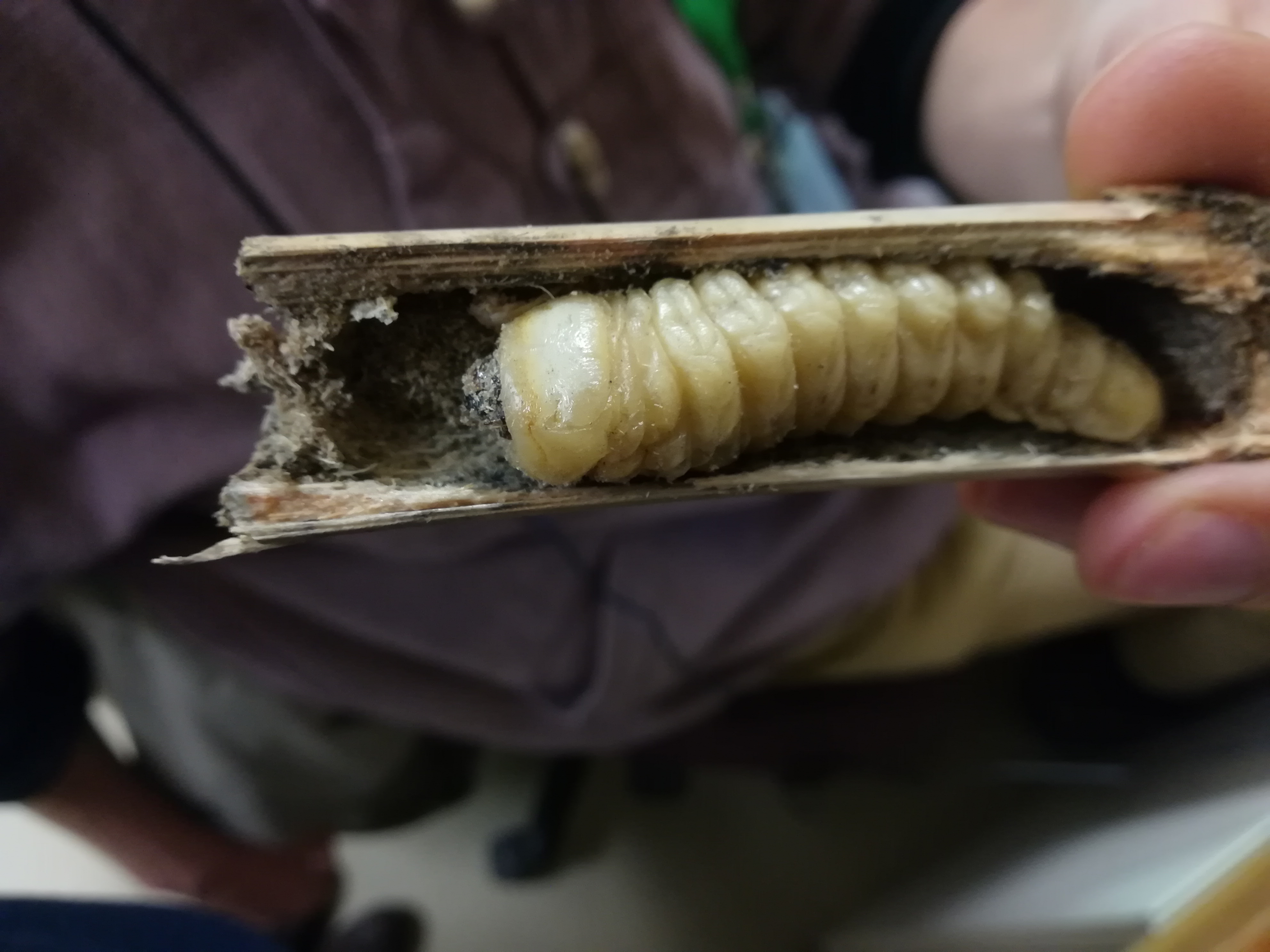
Cacosceles newmannii larva
