= Batus latreillei =

Scientific classification
- Kingdom: Animalia
- Phylum: Arthropoda
- Class: Insecta
- Order: Coleoptera
- Suborder: Polyphaga
- Infraorder: Cucujiformia
- Family: Cerambycidae
- Genus: Batus
- Species: B. latreillei

Binomial name
- Batus latreillei (White, 1853)

Species of beetle

Batus latreillei is a species of beetle in the family Cerambycidae. It was described by White in 1853.
