= Onychocerus ampliatus =

Scientific classification
- Domain: Eukaryota
- Kingdom: Animalia
- Phylum: Arthropoda
- Class: Insecta
- Order: Coleoptera
- Suborder: Polyphaga
- Infraorder: Cucujiformia
- Family: Cerambycidae
- Genus: Onychocerus
- Species: O. ampliatus

Binomial name
- Onychocerus ampliatus Bates, 1875

Species of beetle

Onychocerus ampliatus is a species of beetle in the family Cerambycidae. It was described by Bates in 1875.
