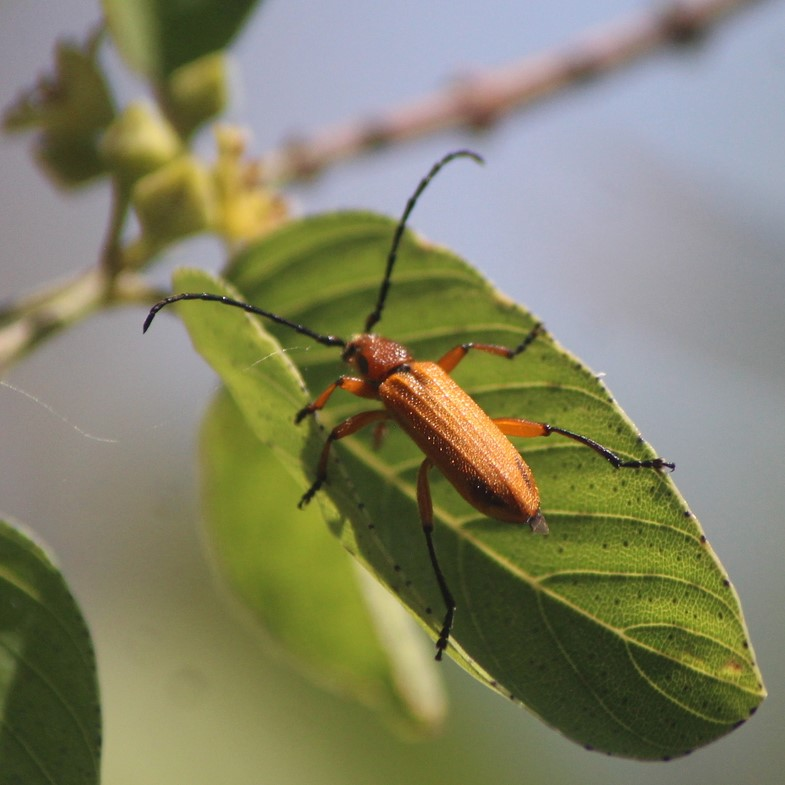

Scientific classification
- Kingdom: Animalia
- Phylum: Arthropoda
- Class: Insecta
- Order: Coleoptera
- Suborder: Polyphaga
- Infraorder: Cucujiformia
- Family: Cerambycidae
- Genus: Elytroleptus
- Species: E. luteus

Binomial name
- Elytroleptus luteus Dugès, 1879

= Elytroleptus luteus =

Species of beetle

Elytroleptus luteus is a species of beetle in the family Cerambycidae. It was first described by Dugès in 1879.
