= Aridaeus princeps =

Scientific classification
- Domain: Eukaryota
- Kingdom: Animalia
- Phylum: Arthropoda
- Class: Insecta
- Order: Coleoptera
- Suborder: Polyphaga
- Infraorder: Cucujiformia
- Family: Cerambycidae
- Genus: Aridaeus
- Species: A. princeps

Binomial name
- Aridaeus princeps Herbert James Carter, 1934

Australian longhorn beetle species

Aridaeus princeps is a species of longhorn beetle belonging to the family Cerambycidae that is found in Australia. It was first documented by Herbert James Carter in North Queensland in 1934.

== Description ==
Male Aridaeus princeps measure 21 mm (0.82 in) in length and 6 mm (0.23 in) in width; the holotype, collected in 1934, was noted to be the largest specimen of the genus Aridaeus. Its physique is characterized by spare white pubescence and a velvety black exterior. Red markings are present on its head, palpi, scutellum, and elytra. The prothorax of Aridaeus princeps is ovate, widest at the middle, and constricted at the base; the scutellum is triangular and pubescent. The elytra, widest at the shoulder display a red pattern, while the long legs with stout femora, terminate behind the tibiae.
