= Elytroleptus floridanus =

Scientific classification
- Domain: Eukaryota
- Kingdom: Animalia
- Phylum: Arthropoda
- Class: Insecta
- Order: Coleoptera
- Suborder: Polyphaga
- Infraorder: Cucujiformia
- Family: Cerambycidae
- Genus: Elytroleptus
- Species: E. floridanus

Binomial name
- Elytroleptus floridanus (LeConte, 1862)

Species of beetle

Elytroleptus floridanus is a species of beetle in the family Cerambycidae. It was described by John Lawrence LeConte in 1862.
