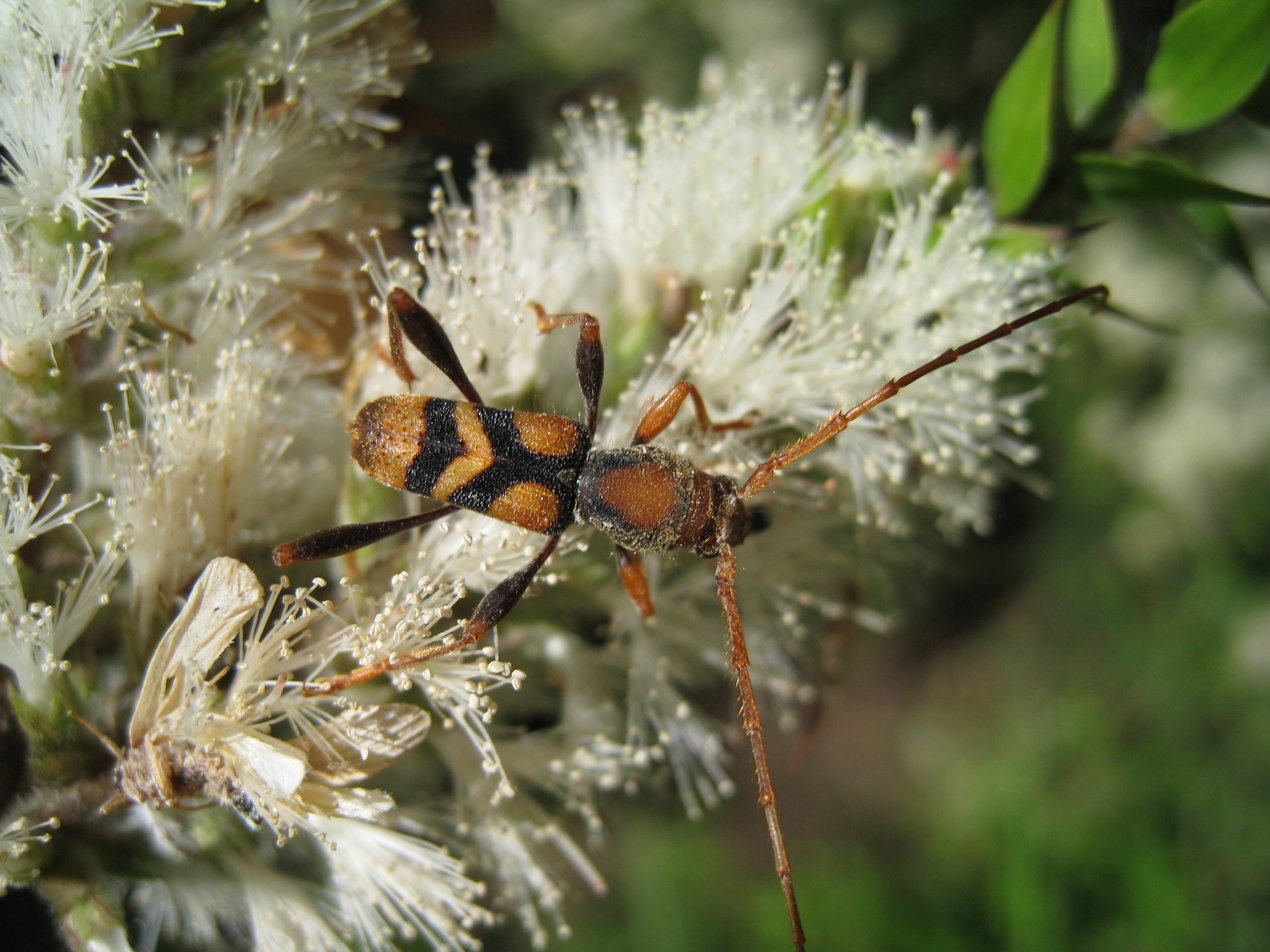
- Aridaeus thoracicus

Scientific classification
- Domain: Eukaryota
- Kingdom: Animalia
- Phylum: Arthropoda
- Class: Insecta
- Order: Coleoptera
- Suborder: Polyphaga
- Infraorder: Cucujiformia
- Family: Cerambycidae
- Genus: Aridaeus; Thomson, 1860

= Aridaeus (beetle) =

Genus of beetles

Aridaeus is a genus of beetles belonging to the family Cerambycidae.

The species of this genus are found in Australia and New Zealand.

Species:

- Aridaeus heros Pascoe, 1866
- Aridaeus nigripes Aurivillius, 1917
- Aridaeus princeps Carter, 1934
- Aridaeus sumbaensis Chemin & Vitali, 2013
- Aridaeus thoracicus (Donovan, 1805)
- Aridaeus timoriensis Jordan, 1894
