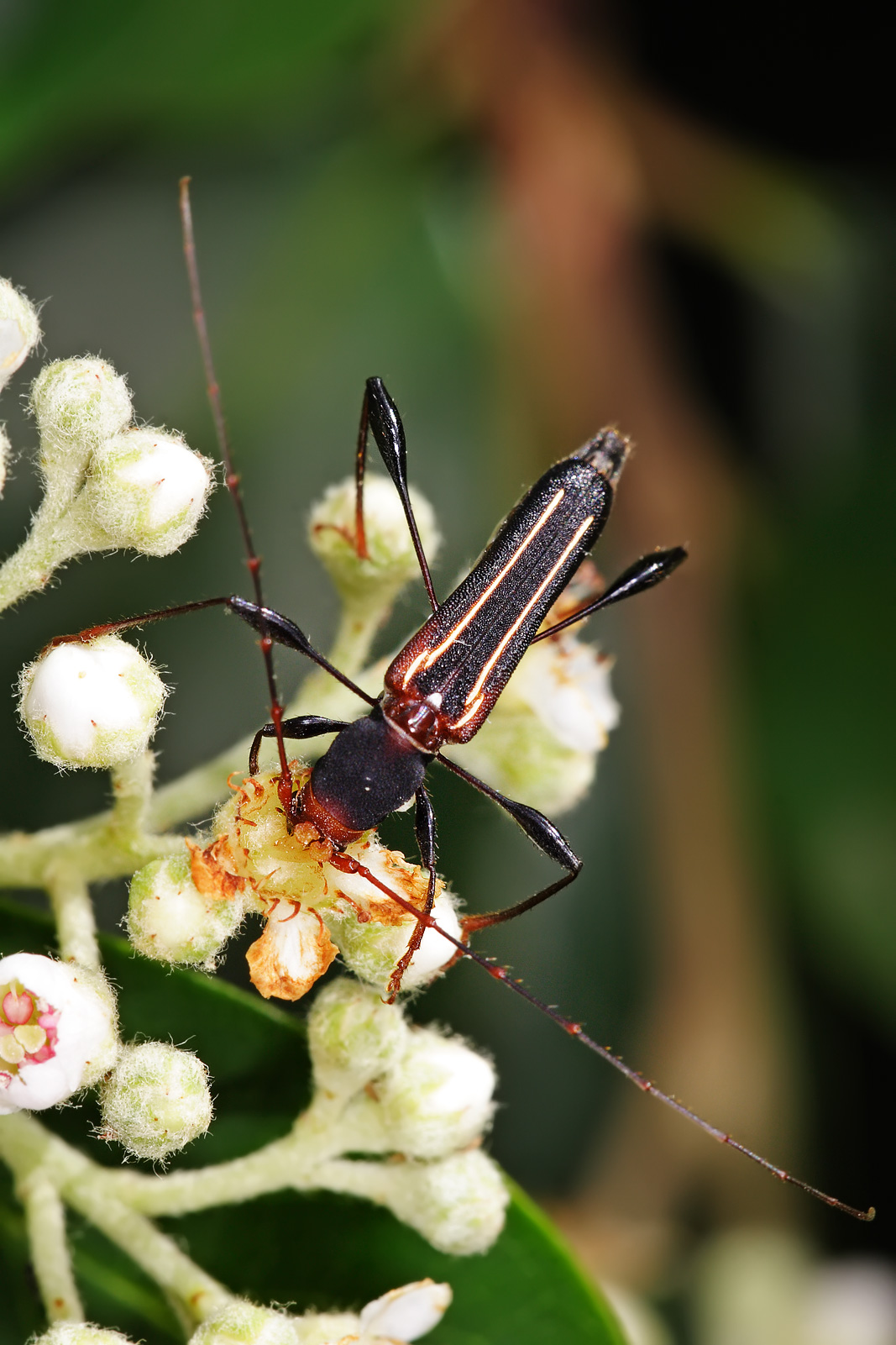
- Feeding

Scientific classification
- Kingdom: Animalia
- Phylum: Arthropoda
- Class: Insecta
- Order: Coleoptera
- Suborder: Polyphaga
- Infraorder: Cucujiformia
- Family: Cerambycidae
- Genus: Amphirhoe
- Species: A. decora

Binomial name
- Amphirhoe decora Newman, 1840

= Amphirhoe decora =

Species of beetle

Amphirhoe decora, the Decora longicorn beetle, is an Australian species of the family Cerambycidae.

== Description ==
This beetle is approximately 18mm in length. It is predominantly dark brown in various shades of red and has a white stripe over each of its two wing covers. Its femurs are the largest of all longicorn beetles. As is typical for longicorn beetles, its antennae are extremely long - three times the length of its body.
