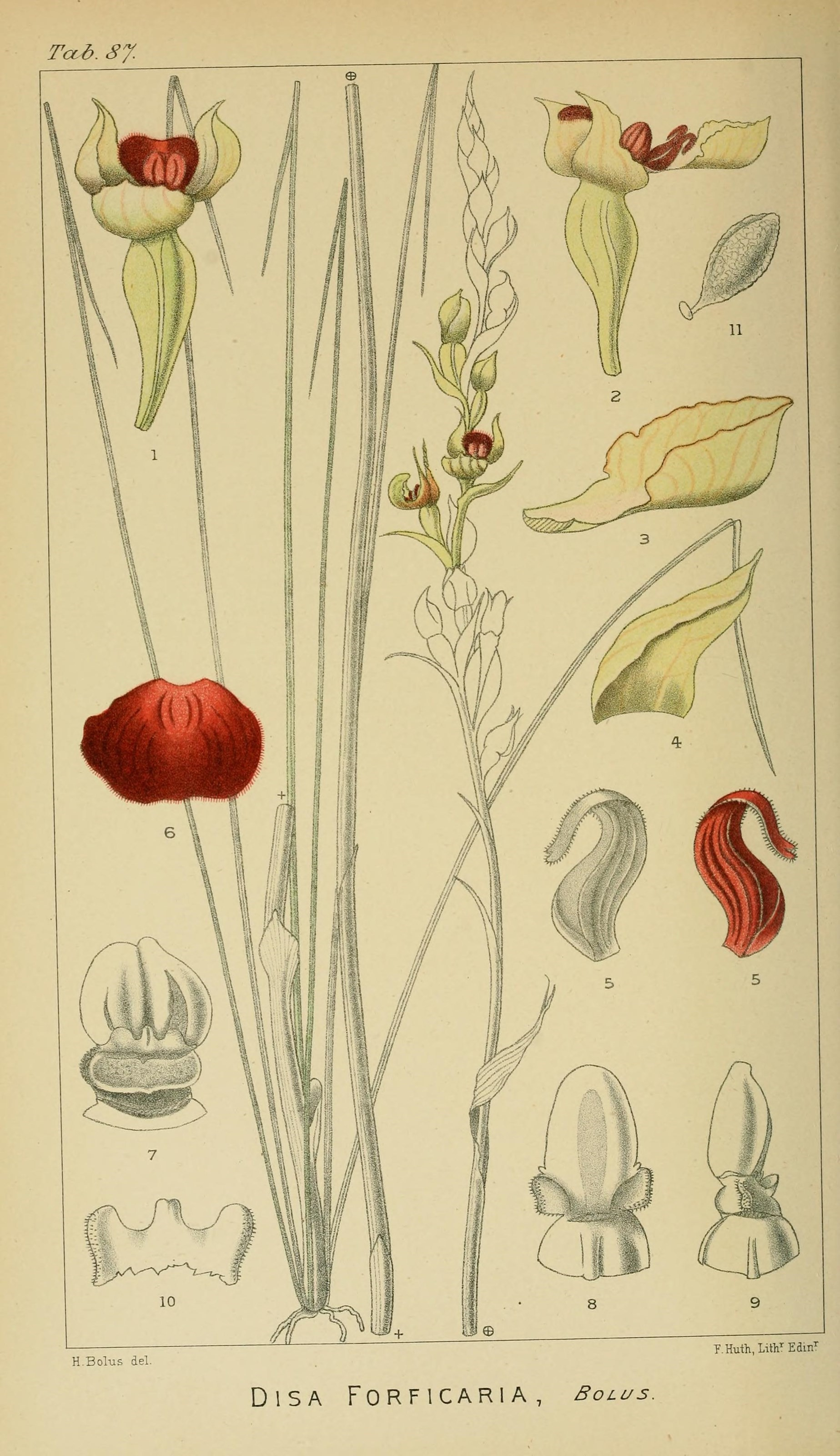

Scientific classification
- Kingdom: Plantae
- Clade: Tracheophytes
- Clade: Angiosperms
- Clade: Monocots
- Order: Asparagales
- Family: Orchidaceae
- Subfamily: Orchidoideae
- Genus: Disa
- Species: D. forficaria

Binomial name
- Disa forficaria Bolus

Synonyms
- Forficaria graminifolia Lindl.; Herschelia forficaria (Bolus) H.P.Linder; Herschelianthe forficaria (Bolus) N.C.Anthony

= Disa forficaria =

Species of flowering plant

Disa forficaria is a perennial plant and geophyte belonging to the genus Disa and is part of the fynbos. The plant is endemic to the Western Cape. The plant occurs at Cape Peninsula, Du Toitskloof, Hottentots Holland Mountains, Houwhoek and Groenland. There are only five plants at a herbarium, all collected before 1966. In 2016, after decades of no confirmed sightings, a single plant was seen flowering at Fernkloof Nature Reserve. From this one plant, a team of scientists were able to determine the pollination syndrome involved sexual mimicry to attract male longhorn beetles.
