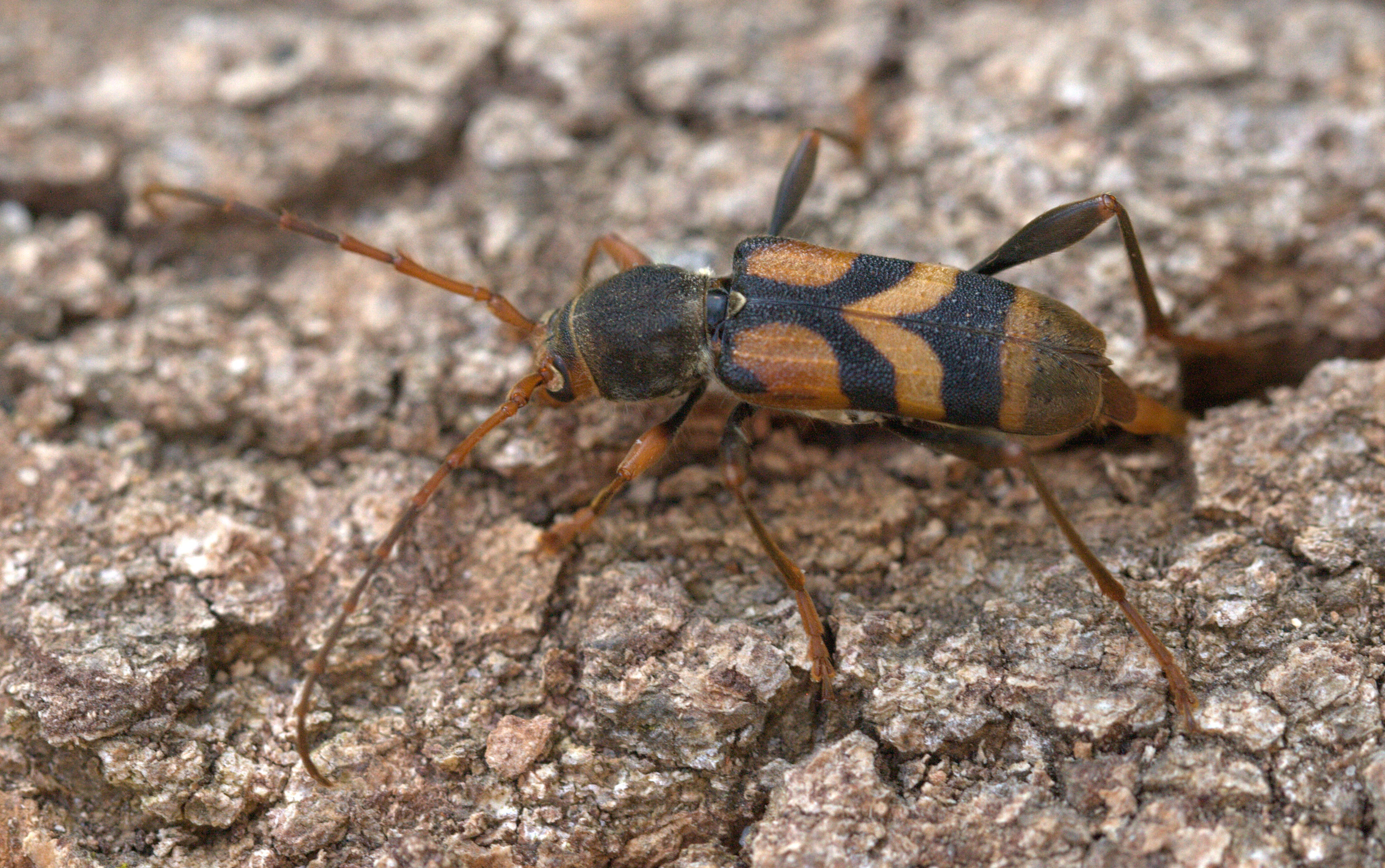
- Female longicorn beetle in Kioloa, New South Wales

Scientific classification
- Kingdom: Animalia
- Phylum: Arthropoda
- Clade: Pancrustacea
- Class: Insecta
- Order: Coleoptera
- Suborder: Polyphaga
- Infraorder: Cucujiformia
- Family: Cerambycidae
- Genus: Aridaeus
- Species: A. thoracicus

Binomial name
- Aridaeus thoracicus Donovan 1805

= Aridaeus thoracicus =

Species of beetle

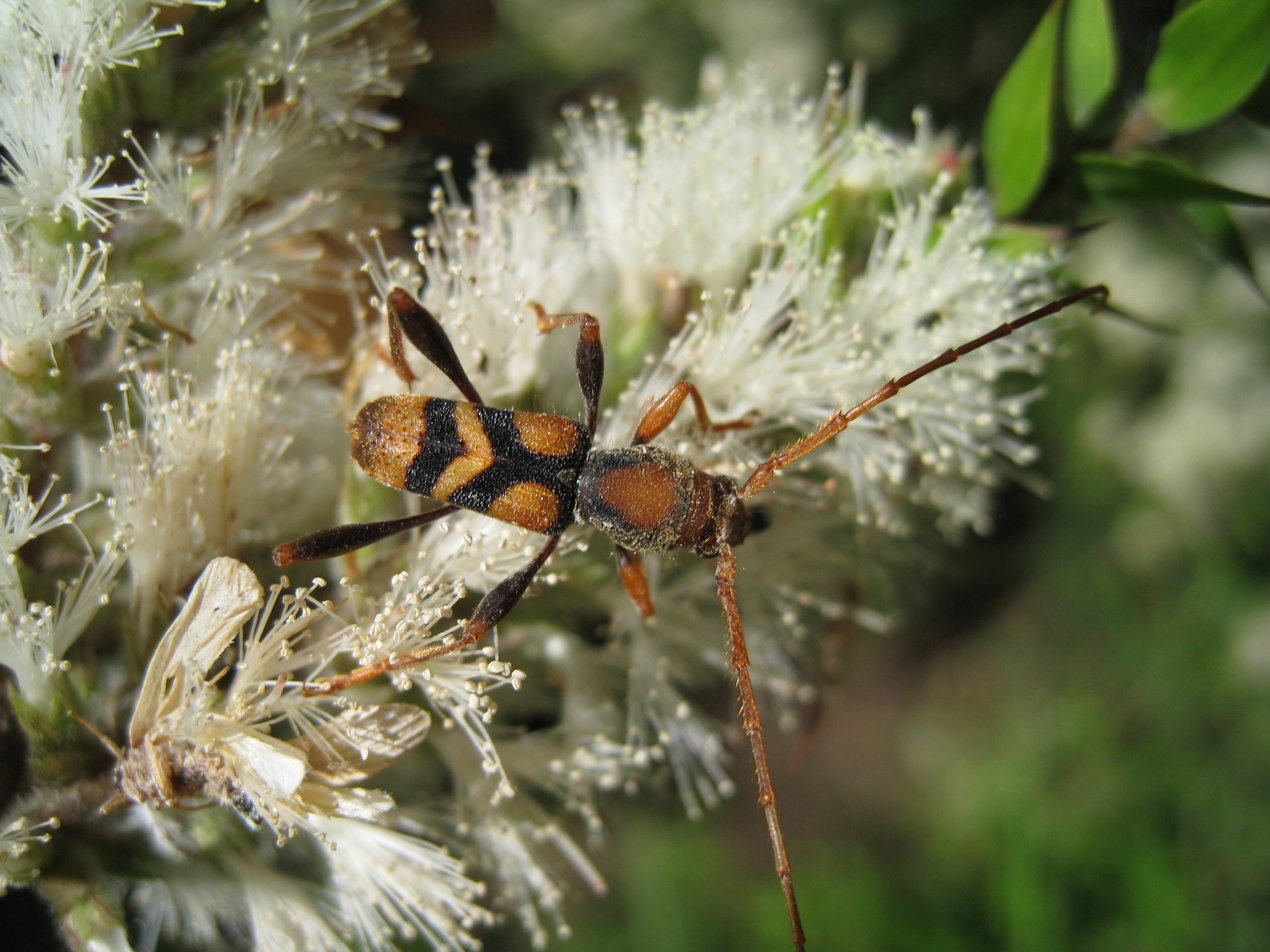
Longicorn beetle on a tick bush at Como, Australia

Aridaeus thoracicus, the tiger longicorn, is a common beetle found in Australia. It has also been introduced to New Zealand. An attractively marked insect with orange and black patterns, the femur of each leg is swollen in the middle. Orange hairs may be noticed on the legs and thorax. It was described by Anglo-Irish naturalist Edward Donovan in 1805.

In the warmer months, adults are seen on flowering plants, feeding on the pollen and nectar, particularly those in the myrtle family. Larvae feed on dead wood of a variety of trees. Hosts include Avicennia marina and species in the genus Eucalyptus.
