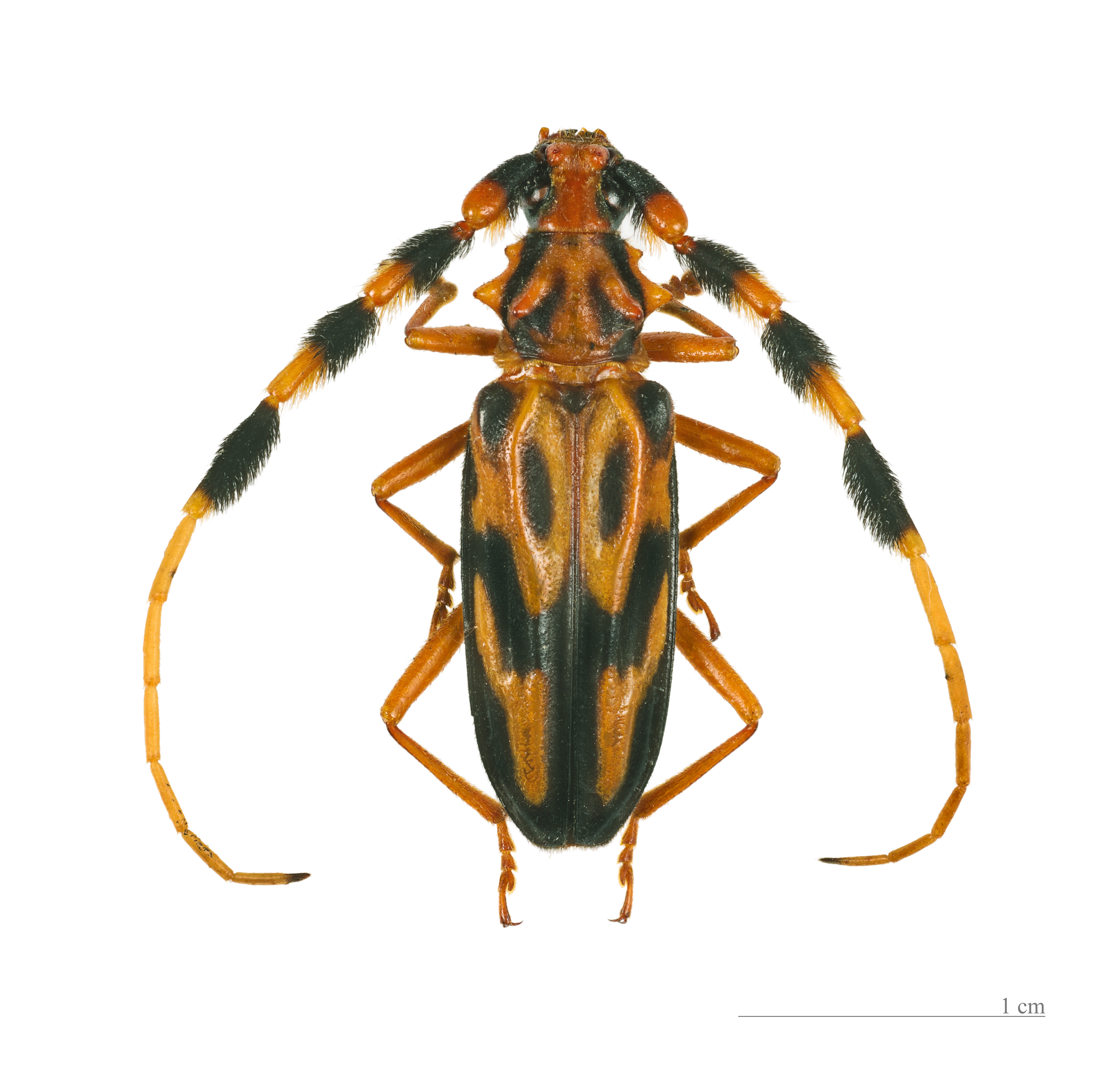
- Image from MHNT

Scientific classification
- Kingdom: Animalia
- Phylum: Arthropoda
- Class: Insecta
- Order: Coleoptera
- Suborder: Polyphaga
- Infraorder: Cucujiformia
- Family: Cerambycidae
- Genus: Batus
- Species: B. barbicornis

Binomial name
- Batus barbicornis (Linnaeus, 1764)

Synonyms
- Cerambyx barbicornis Linnaeus, 1764; Lophonocerus barbicornis (Linnaeus, 1764); Cerambyx guianus Goeze, 1777; Cerambyx speciosus Voet, 1778 (Unav.); Lophonocerus hirticornis Blanchard, 1849; Lophonocerus tuberculicollis Chabrillac, 1857; Batus tuberculicollis (Chabrillac, 1857); Lophocerus barbatus Chenu, 1870; Batus barbicornis itaitubensis Tippmann, 1953

= Batus barbicornis =

Species of beetle

Batus barbicornis is a species of beetle in the family Cerambycidae. It was described by Carl Linnaeus in 1764.

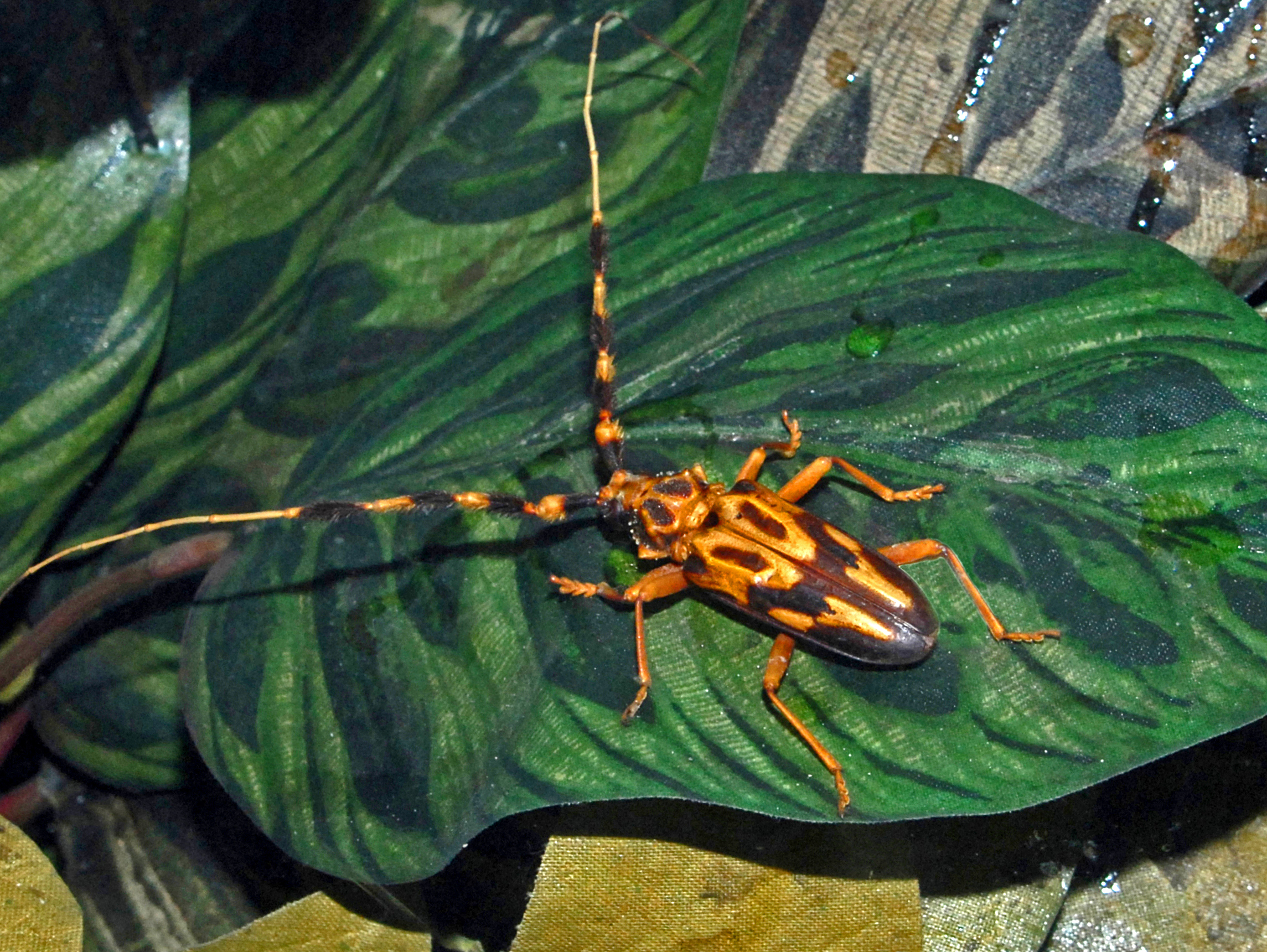

== Description ==
Batus barbicornis grows up to 4 centimetres in length. The species shows aposematic coloration of contrasting black and orange, with red antennae adorned with four black setal tufts.

== Distribution ==
This species is native to South America. It can be found in Colombia, Venezuela, Ecuador, Peru, Brazil, Suriname, French Guiana, Guyana and Bolivia.
