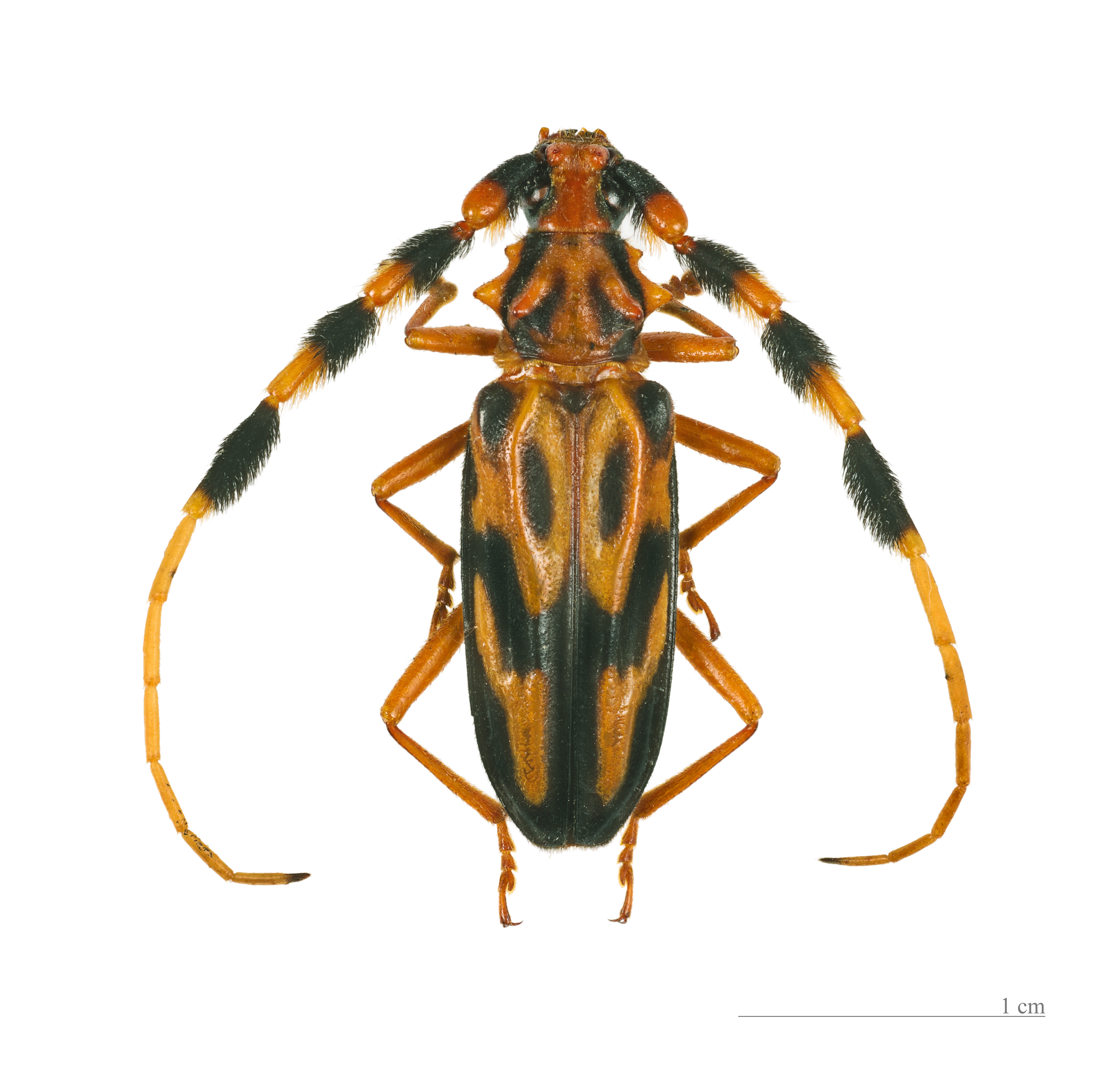
- Batus barbicornis

Scientific classification
- Domain: Eukaryota
- Kingdom: Animalia
- Phylum: Arthropoda
- Class: Insecta
- Order: Coleoptera
- Suborder: Polyphaga
- Infraorder: Cucujiformia
- Family: Cerambycidae
- Tribe: Trachyderini
- Genus: Batus (Thunberg, 1822)

= Batus (beetle) =

Genus of beetles

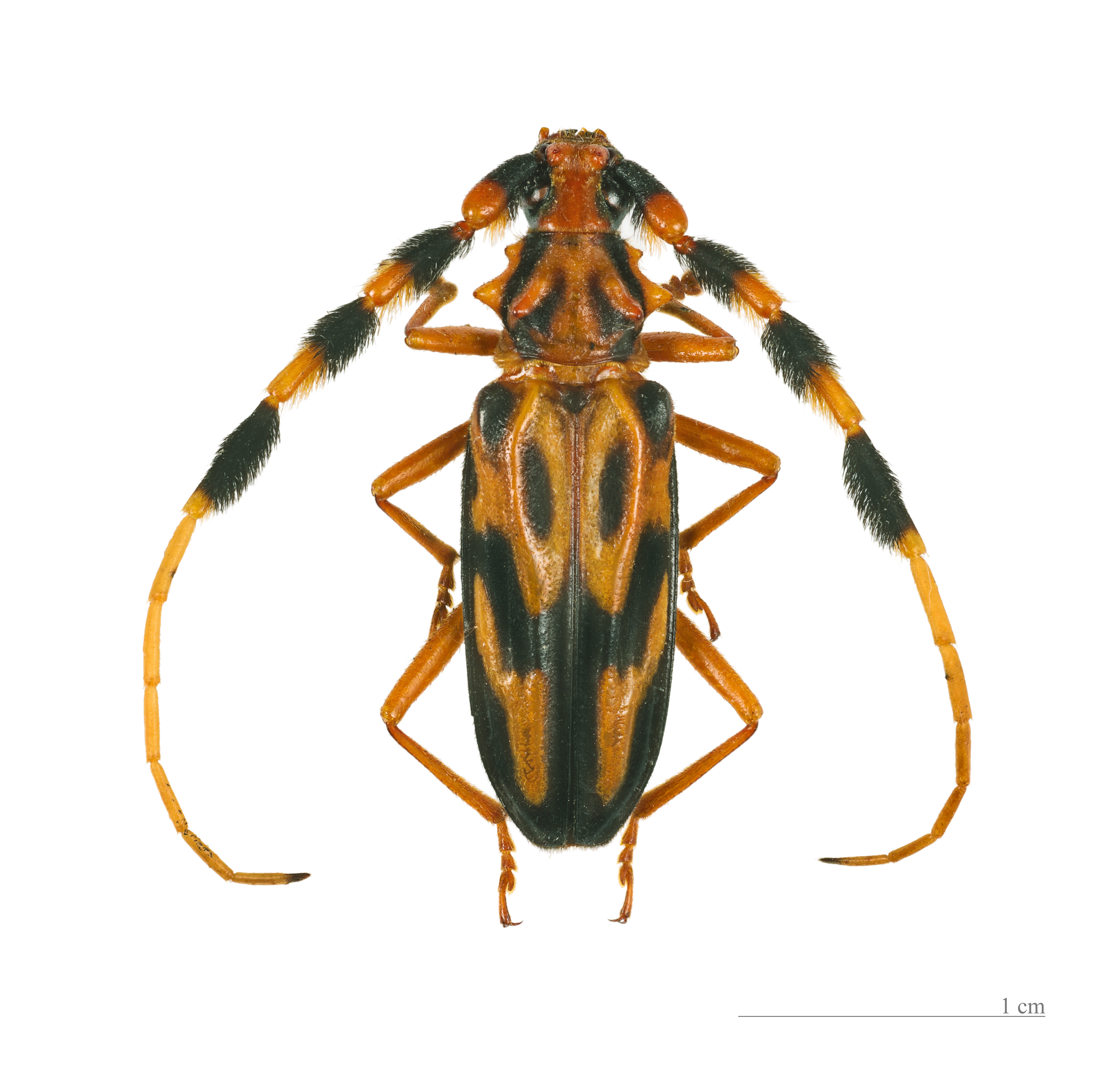

Batus is a genus of beetles in the family Cerambycidae, containing the following species:

- Batus barbicornis (Linnaeus, 1764)
- Batus hirticornis (Gyllenhal in Schoenherr, 1817)
- Batus latreillei (White, 1853)
