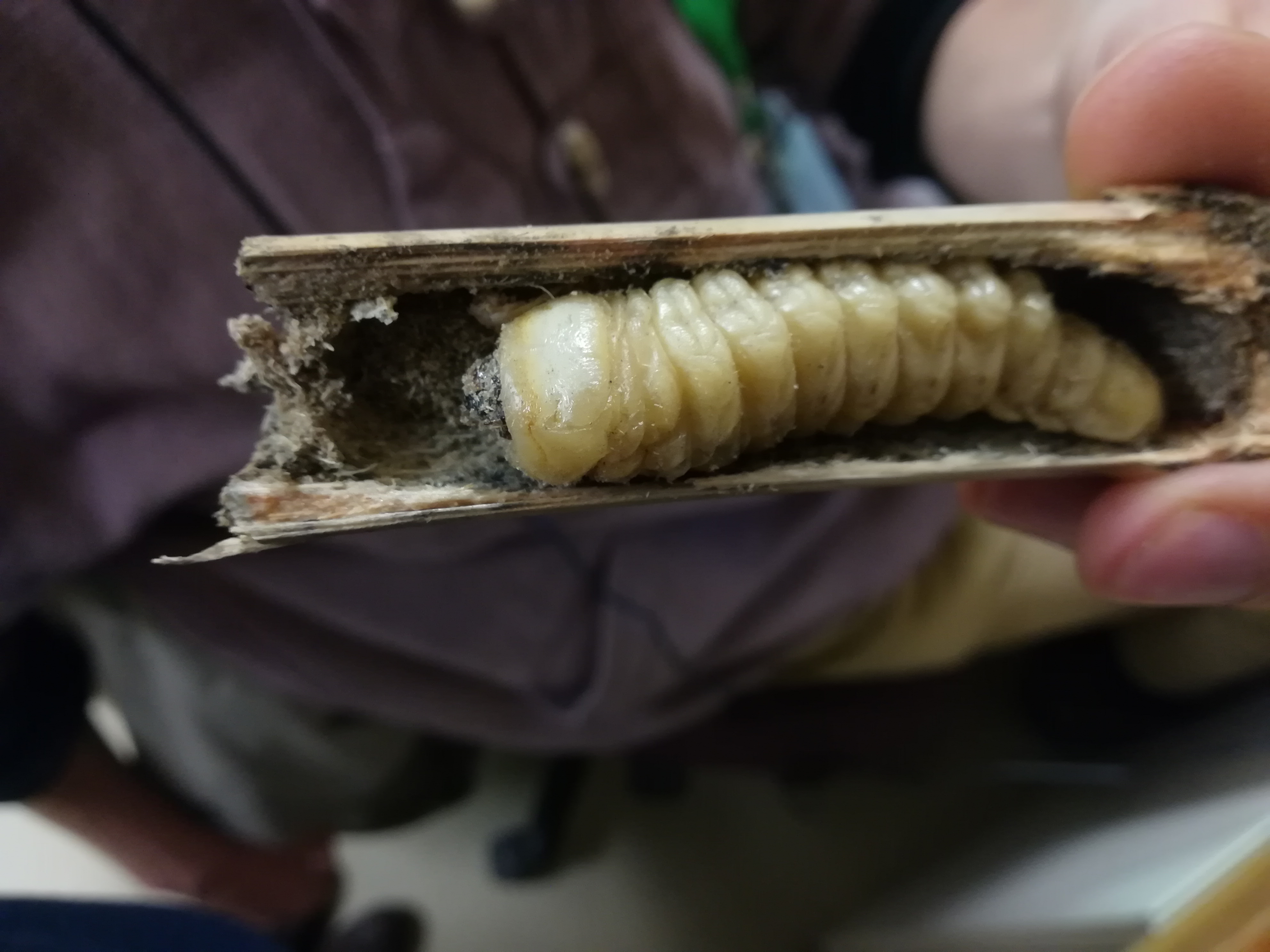
- Cacosceles newmannii larva in a sugarcane stalk

Scientific classification
- Kingdom: Animalia
- Phylum: Arthropoda
- Clade: Pancrustacea
- Class: Insecta
- Order: Coleoptera
- Suborder: Polyphaga
- Infraorder: Cucujiformia
- Family: Cerambycidae
- Genus: Cacosceles
- Species: C. newmannii

Binomial name
- Cacosceles newmannii Thomson, 1877

Synonyms
- Cacosceles crassicornis Peringuet 1885; Cacosceles lacordairei Bates 1878

= Cacosceles newmannii =

Species of beetle

Cacosceles newmannii is a species of longhorned beetle in the family Cerambycidae native to Southern Africa (Mozambique, Eswatini and South Africa ). Its natural host plants have not yet been fully determined, but may include species from the family Myrtaceae, and it has started to become a pest of sugarcane crops. It is assumed that its life cycle lasts two years, during which the larvae feed on organic matter.

Adults emerge and mate in summer. Their lifespan is estimated to be between one and two months. Both males and females show marked sexual dimorphism. Males are characterized by very long, asymmetrical mandibles (the left mandible has a preapical internal tooth), while female mandibles are much shorter and thicker. Males exhibit a broad tomentose groove along the basal half of the middle and posterior tibiae (fourth segment of the leg of an insect), which is absent in females. Males are generally smaller than females. In this species, fights were regularly observed between males.

Larvae of Cacosceles newmannii were found in 2015 in sugarcane crops in KwaZulu-Natal province in South Africa. The larvae can tunnel in the lower part of the cane stalk 8 to 20 cm upwards, but are mostly found in the underground section of the stems, at root level.

The beetle has been used as a model for studying arthropod respiratory structures, with tracheal volume studied in 3D using X-ray micro-tomography scanning living larvae sedated with sevoflurane. This work showing the tracheal structures in detail, and also showing tracheal oxygen supply capacity increases during development at a comparable, or even higher rate than metabolic demand.
