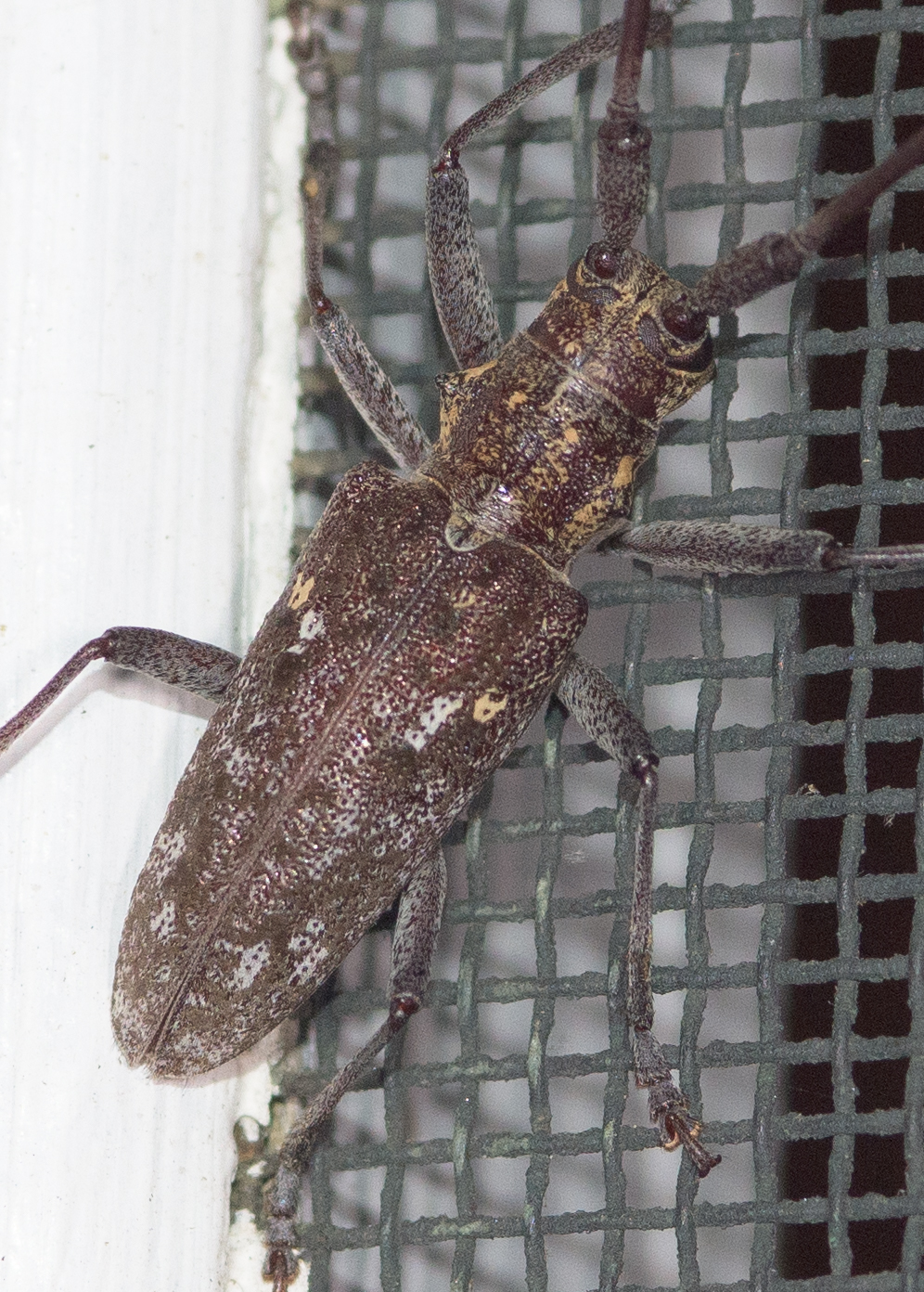

Scientific classification
- Kingdom: Animalia
- Phylum: Arthropoda
- Clade: Pancrustacea
- Class: Insecta
- Order: Coleoptera
- Suborder: Polyphaga
- Infraorder: Cucujiformia
- Family: Cerambycidae
- Genus: Monochamus
- Species: M. carolinensis

Binomial name
- Monochamus carolinensis (Olivier, 1792)

Synonyms
- Lamia carolinensis Olivier, 1792; Lamia dentator Fabricius, 1793; Monohammus minor LeConte, 1873

= Monochamus carolinensis =

Species of beetle

Monochamus carolinensis, the Carolina pine sawyer, is a species of beetle in the family Cerambycidae. It was described by Guillaume-Antoine Olivier in 1792. It is known from Canada and the United States.

The species resembles Monochamus titillator, distinguished by the having the apical margin of the elytra at a shallower angle to the elytral midline, and by the shape of the adjacent tiny tip of the elytra, which is typically more rounded in M. carolinensis than M. titillator. The male antennae are shorter relative to the body in M. carolinensis than in M. titillator, being about twice the body length in males of the former species. The larval stages may be difficult to distinguish.

Zhao et al. reported trapping M. carolinensis in Beijing, China in 2022.

Monochamus carolinensis adults are active from May through at least September in the southeastern United States, with 1 to 1.5 generations per year reported in North Carolina's Piedmont. Females oviposit on dead, either standing or felled, pine trees, laying one to three eggs per niche excavated between outer bark and phloem. Examples of host species include Pinus banksiana, Pinus sylvestris and Pinus echinata. Adult beetles fly to feed on twigs of live pine trees; this is important due to the beetle's potential role as a vector of pine wilt disease. Nematodes in their late larval stage enter into the tracheal pores of the teneral adult beetle and crawl off the posterior end of the beetle into chewed wood during feeding or, more commonly, during oviposition.
