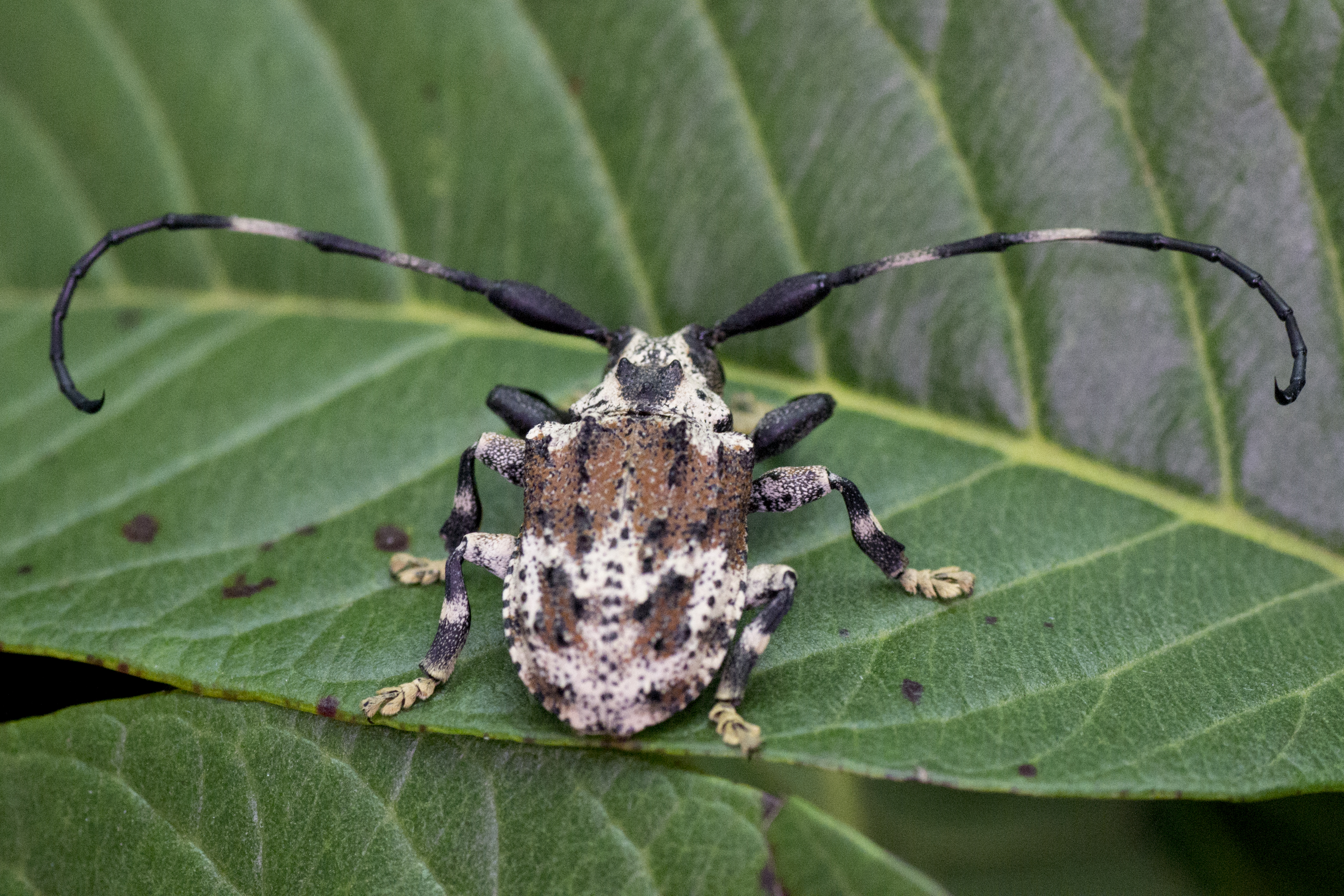

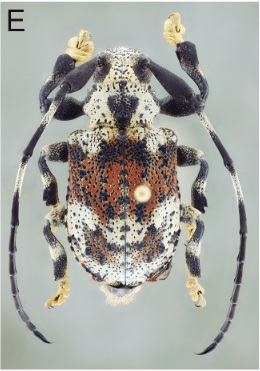

Scientific classification
- Kingdom: Animalia
- Phylum: Arthropoda
- Clade: Pancrustacea
- Class: Insecta
- Order: Coleoptera
- Suborder: Polyphaga
- Infraorder: Cucujiformia
- Family: Cerambycidae
- Genus: Onychocerus
- Species: O. albitarsis

Binomial name
- Onychocerus albitarsis Pascoe, 1859

= Onychocerus albitarsis =

Species of beetle

Onychocerus albitarsis, also known as the scorpion beetle, is a species of beetle in the family Cerambycidae from the Amazon and Atlantic forest regions in Brazil, Bolivia, Paraguay and southern Peru. It is the only known beetle that has a venomous sting (as opposed to spraying toxins like bombardier beetles or secreting toxins from the body like blister beetles) and the only known arthropod that stings with its antennae. Each antenna ends in a stinger that resembles a scorpion's tail and is connected to a venom gland. The scorpion beetle's sting was known for centuries, being reported as early as 1884, but was not confirmed to be venomous until 2005. In one case of the beetle stinging a human, a woman experienced significant pain directly after the incident, and redness and itching at the sting site that lasted for a week. In the other case, a man experienced moderate pain directly after being stung and redness that only lasted for an hour. The other species in the genus Onychocerus appear to be non-venomous, since they lack the structures inside the antennae that are associated with the venom apparatus of Onychocerus albitarsis.

Onychocerus albitarsis has a head-and-body that is about 2 cm (0.8 in) long and has a variable mottled pattern in yellow-brown, black and white. Little is known about its behavior, but it is phytophagous.
