= Elytroleptus =

Scientific classification
- Kingdom: Animalia
- Phylum: Arthropoda
- Class: Insecta
- Order: Coleoptera
- Suborder: Polyphaga
- Infraorder: Cucujiformia
- Family: Cerambycidae
- Tribe: Trachyderini
- Genus: Elytroleptus; Duges, 1879

Genus of beetles

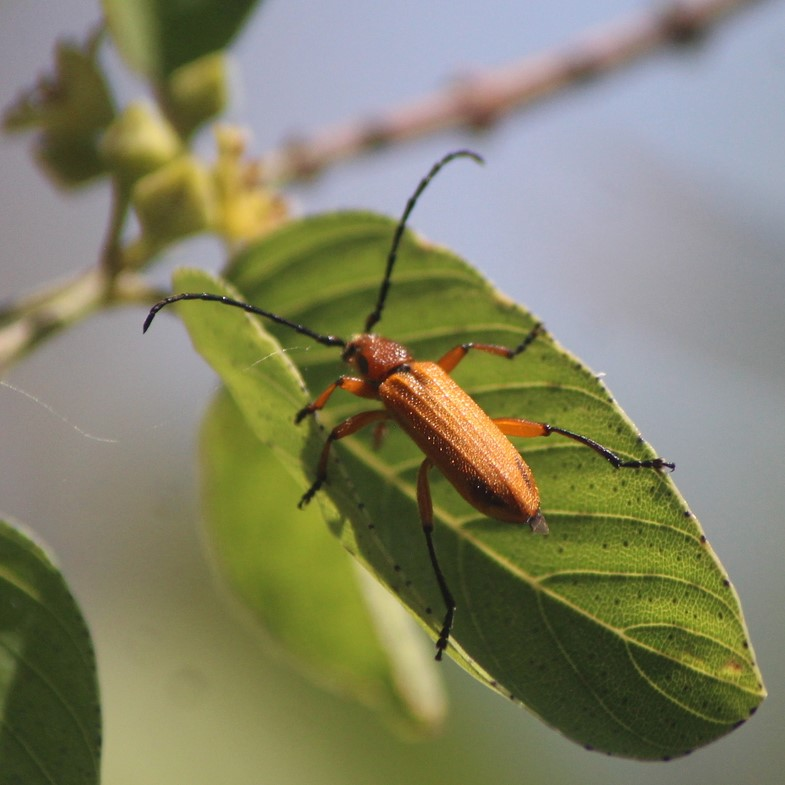
Elytroleptus luteus

Elytroleptus is a genus of beetles in the family Cerambycidae, containing the following species:

- Elytroleptus apicalis (LeConte, 1884)
- Elytroleptus dichromaticus Linsley, 1961
- Elytroleptus divisus (LeConte, 1884)
- Elytroleptus floridanus (LeConte, 1862)
- Elytroleptus grandis Linsley, 1935
- Elytroleptus humeralis Linsley, 1961
- Elytroleptus ignitus (LeConte, 1884)
- Elytroleptus immaculipennis Knull, 1935
- Elytroleptus limpianus Skiles & Chemsak, 1982
- Elytroleptus luteicollis Skiles & Chemsak, 1982
- Elytroleptus luteus Dugès, 1879
- Elytroleptus metallicus (Nonfried, 1894)
- Elytroleptus nigripennis Bates, 1885
- Elytroleptus pallidus (Thomson, 1860)
- Elytroleptus peninsularis Hovore, 1988
- Elytroleptus rufipennis (LeConte, 1884)
- Elytroleptus scabricollis Bates, 1892
- Elytroleptus similis Chemsak & Linsley, 1965
