= Derobrachus smithi =

Scientific classification
- Kingdom: Animalia
- Phylum: Arthropoda
- Clade: Pancrustacea
- Class: Insecta
- Order: Coleoptera
- Suborder: Polyphaga
- Infraorder: Cucujiformia
- Family: Cerambycidae
- Genus: Derobrachus
- Species: D. smithi

Binomial name
- Derobrachus smithi Bates, 1892

Species of beetle

Derobrachus smithi is a species of beetle in the family Cerambycidae. It was described by Henry Walter Bates in 1892.
