= Derobrachus wappesi =

Scientific classification
- Kingdom: Animalia
- Phylum: Arthropoda
- Clade: Pancrustacea
- Class: Insecta
- Order: Coleoptera
- Suborder: Polyphaga
- Infraorder: Cucujiformia
- Family: Cerambycidae
- Genus: Derobrachus
- Species: D. wappesi

Binomial name
- Derobrachus wappesi Santos-Silva, 2007

Species of beetle

Derobrachus wappesi is a species of beetle in the family Cerambycidae. It was described by Santos-Silva in 2007.
