= Derobrachus brevicollis =

Scientific classification
- Kingdom: Animalia
- Phylum: Arthropoda
- Clade: Pancrustacea
- Class: Insecta
- Order: Coleoptera
- Suborder: Polyphaga
- Infraorder: Cucujiformia
- Family: Cerambycidae
- Genus: Derobrachus
- Species: D. brevicollis

Binomial name
- Derobrachus brevicollis Audinet-Serville, 1832

Species of beetle

Derobrachus brevicollis is a species of beetle in the family Cerambycidae. It was described by Jean Guillaume Audinet-Serville in 1832.
