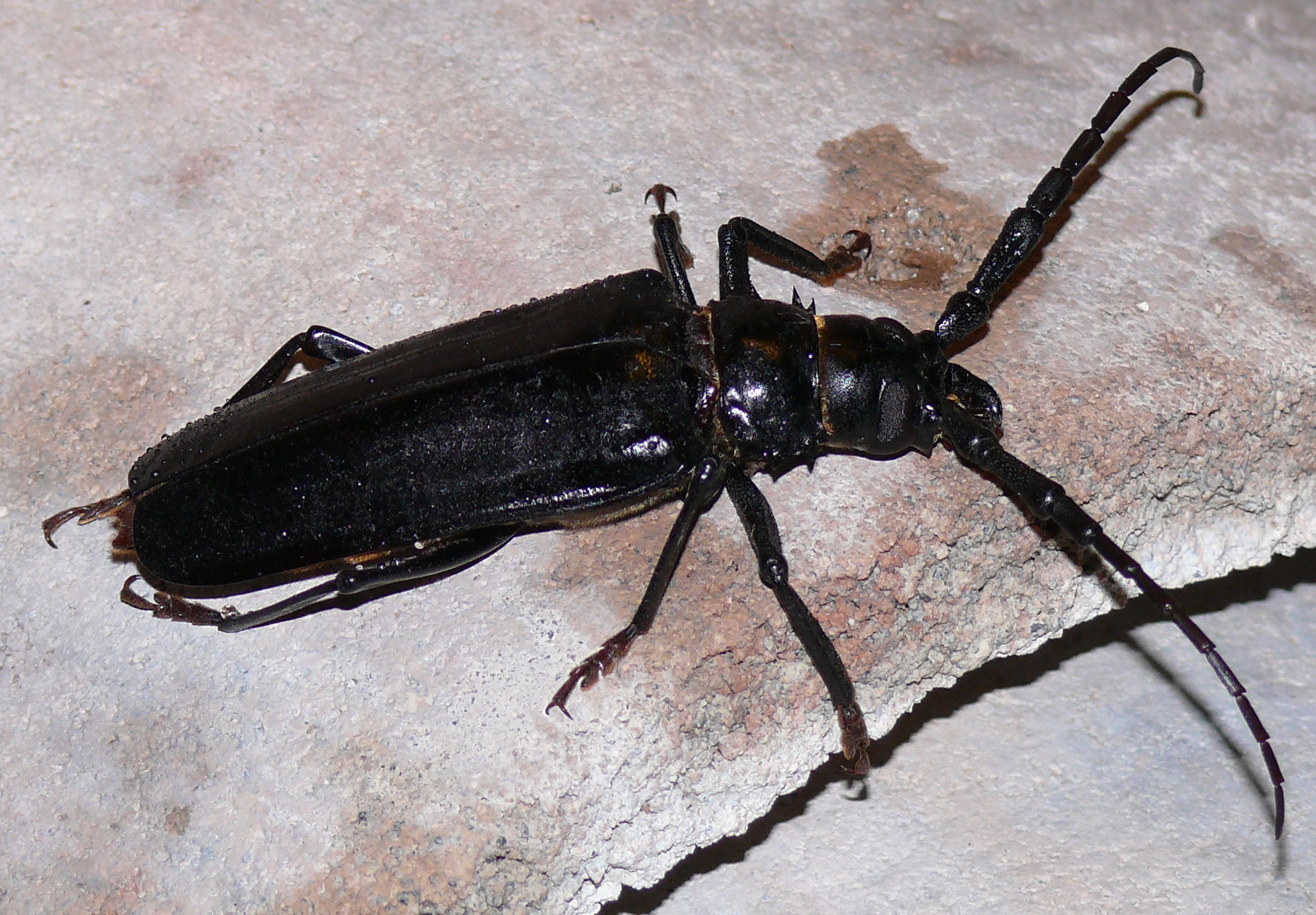
- Palo Verde borer beetle (Derobrachus hovorei)

Scientific classification
- Domain: Eukaryota
- Kingdom: Animalia
- Phylum: Arthropoda
- Class: Insecta
- Order: Coleoptera
- Suborder: Polyphaga
- Infraorder: Cucujiformia
- Family: Cerambycidae
- Subfamily: Prioninae
- Tribe: Prionini
- Genus: Derobrachus; Audinet-Serville, 1832

Synonyms
- Braderochus Lacordaire, 1869; Pithocles Thomson, 1864

= Derobrachus =

Genus of beetles

Derobrachus is a genus of beetles in the Cerambycidae. It contains the following species:

- Derobrachus agyleus Buquet, 1852
- Derobrachus apterus Bates, 1879
- Derobrachus asperatus Bates, 1878
- Derobrachus brevicollis Audinet-Serville, 1832
- Derobrachus chemsaki Santos-Silva, 2007
- Derobrachus cusucoensis Santos-Silva et al., 2018
- Derobrachus digueti Lameere, 1915
- Derobrachus dohrni Lameere, 1911
- Derobrachus drumonti Santos-Silva, 2007
- Derobrachus geminatus LeConte, 1853
- Derobrachus granulatus Bates, 1884
- Derobrachus hovorei Santos-Silva, 2007
- Derobrachus inaequalis (Bates, 1872)
- Derobrachus leechi Chemsak & Linsley, 1977
- Derobrachus lingafelteri Santos-Silva, 2007
- Derobrachus longicornis (Bates, 1872)
- Derobrachus megacles Bates, 1884
- Derobrachus procerus Thomson, 1860
- Derobrachus smithi Bates, 1892
- Derobrachus sulcicornis LeConte, 1851
- Derobrachus thomasi Santos-Silva, 2007
- Derobrachus wappesi Santos-Silva, 2007
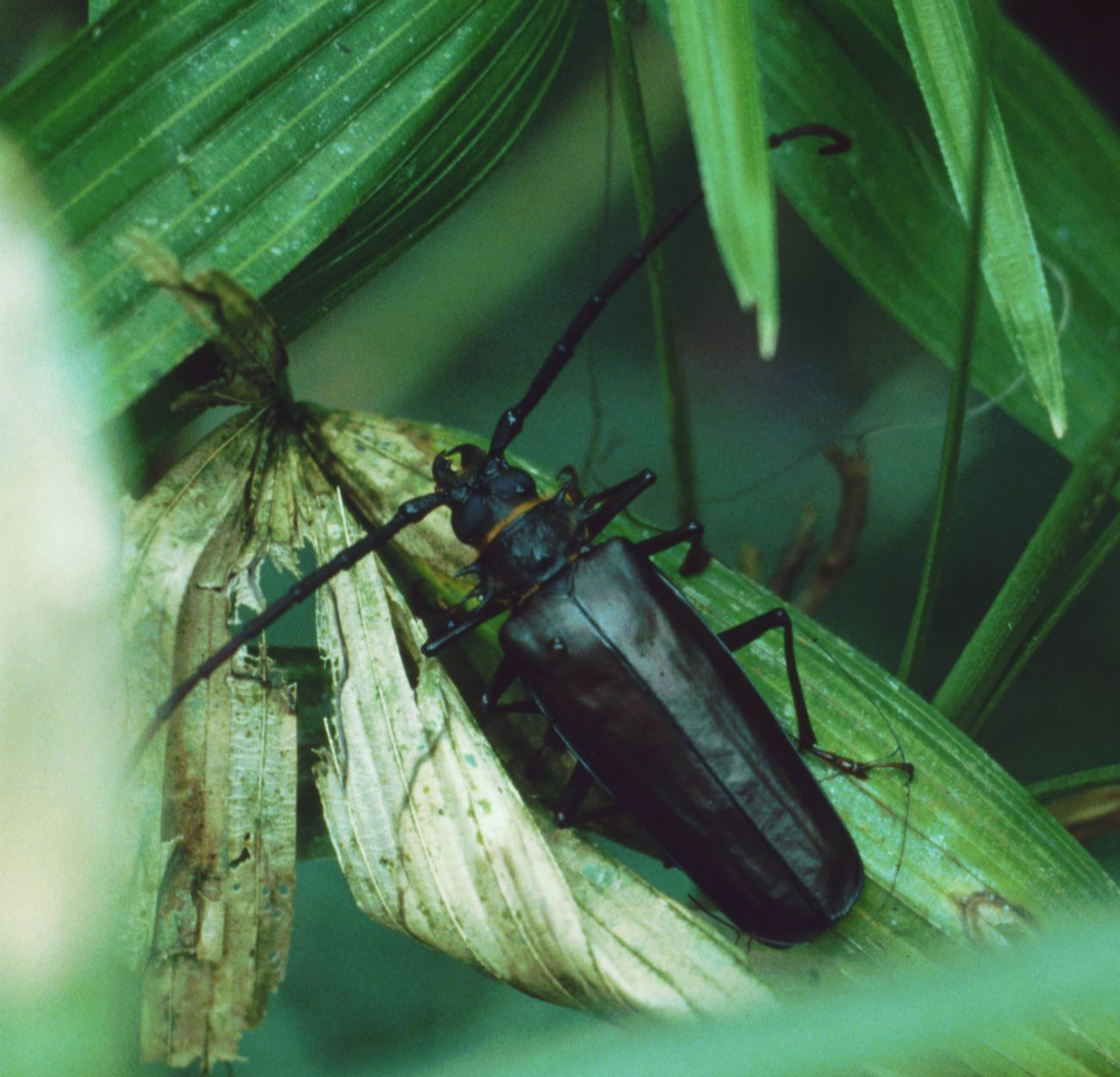
Derobrachus longicornis (Bates, 1872)

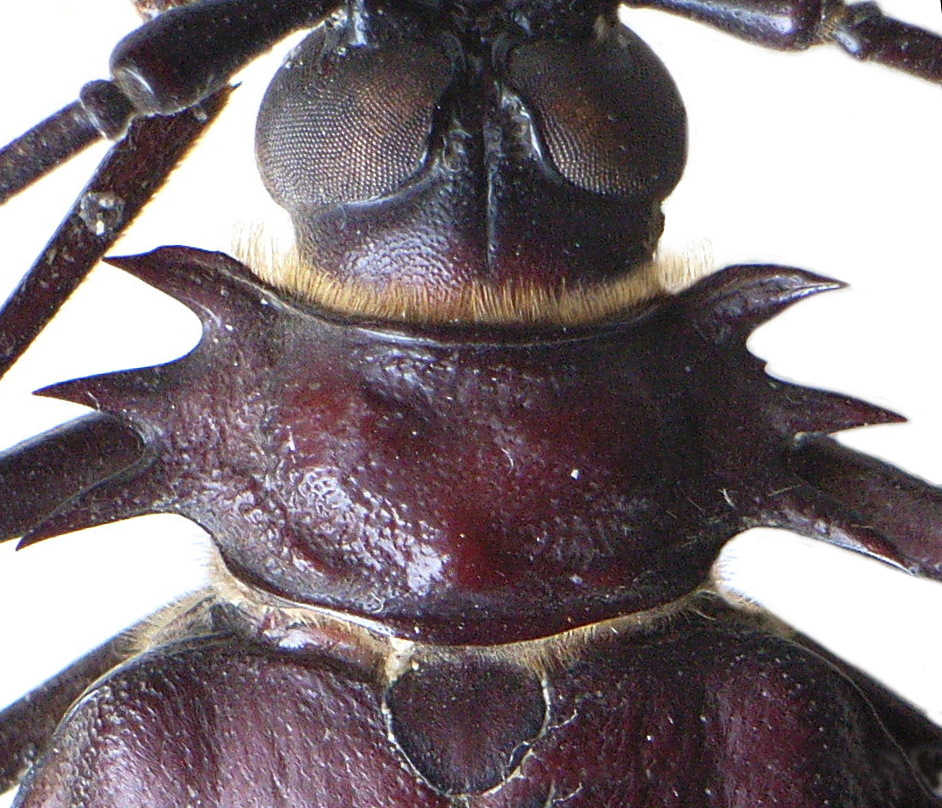
detail

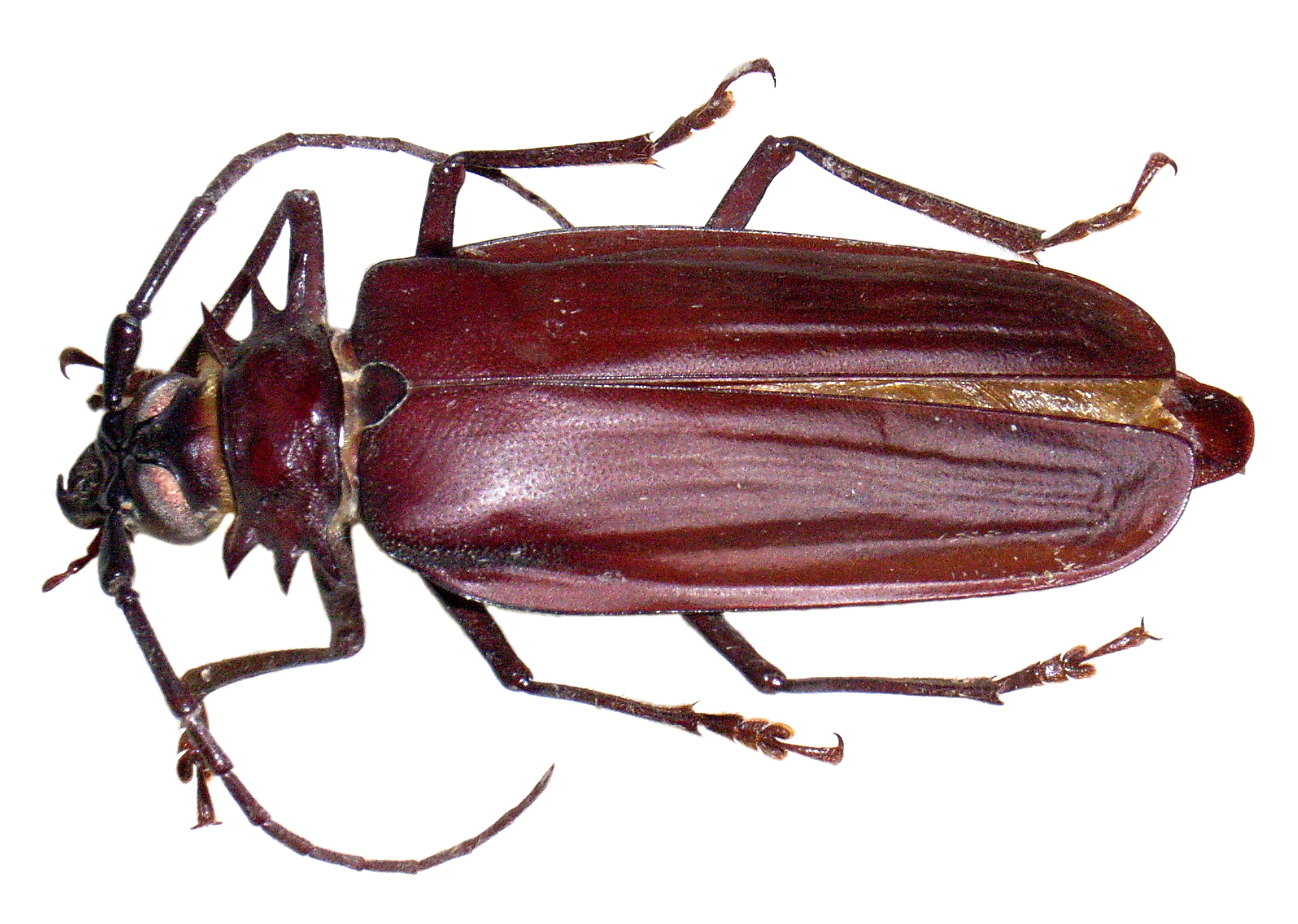
unidentified species
