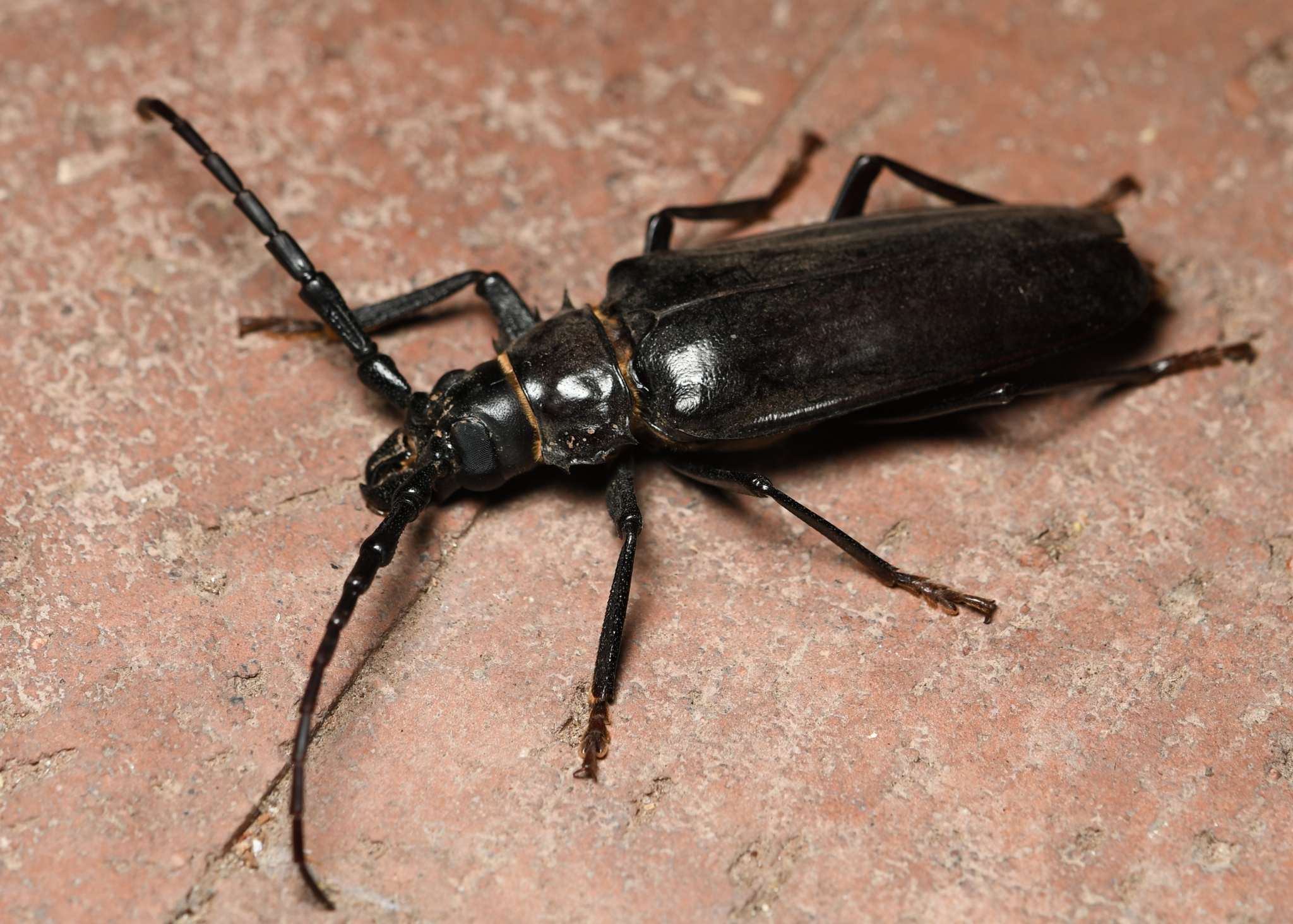

Scientific classification
- Kingdom: Animalia
- Phylum: Arthropoda
- Clade: Pancrustacea
- Class: Insecta
- Order: Coleoptera
- Suborder: Polyphaga
- Infraorder: Cucujiformia
- Family: Cerambycidae
- Genus: Derobrachus
- Species: D. hovorei

Binomial name
- Derobrachus hovorei Santos-Silva, 2007

= Derobrachus hovorei =

Species of beetle

Derobrachus hovorei is a species of beetle in the family Cerambycidae, known variously as the palo verde beetle, palo verde root borer, or palo verde borer beetle. For over 100 years, this species was confused with the related species Derobrachus geminatus, and only recognized and given its own name by Santos-Silva in 2007; essentially all literature prior to 2007 therefore incorrectly uses the name geminatus for this species. It is a longhorn beetle native to the southwestern United States and northern Mexico which derives its common name from the palo verde tree, and it is one of the largest beetles in North America, reaching up to 3-1/2 inches in length. Adults are black or brown in color, have long antennae, and spines on the thorax. They have wings and can fly, albeit awkwardly at times. Mature beetles emerge in the summer to mate. While not harmful to humans, they can bite in self-defense.

Derobrachus hovorei hatches from eggs into grubs, which live underground for as long as three years; as a result, the huge grubs can be uncovered by gardeners doing routine yard maintenance, especially in flower beds surrounding lawns that contain susceptible trees. The larvae are cream colored to pale green, typically with a brown head, and feed on the roots of trees, causing branches to die back. In the wild, the most commonly affected tree is the palo verde, although wild specimens of other Parkinsonia species (P. florida, P. microphylla, and P. sonorae among the most common) are attacked, as well. In urban areas (such as parks, college campuses, cemeteries and the like) where species of Parkinsonia are not often found, D. hovorei can feed on the roots of a variety of trees, including the Siberian elm, white and fruitless mulberry, various cottonwoods, and in the warmest desert areas, citrus.
