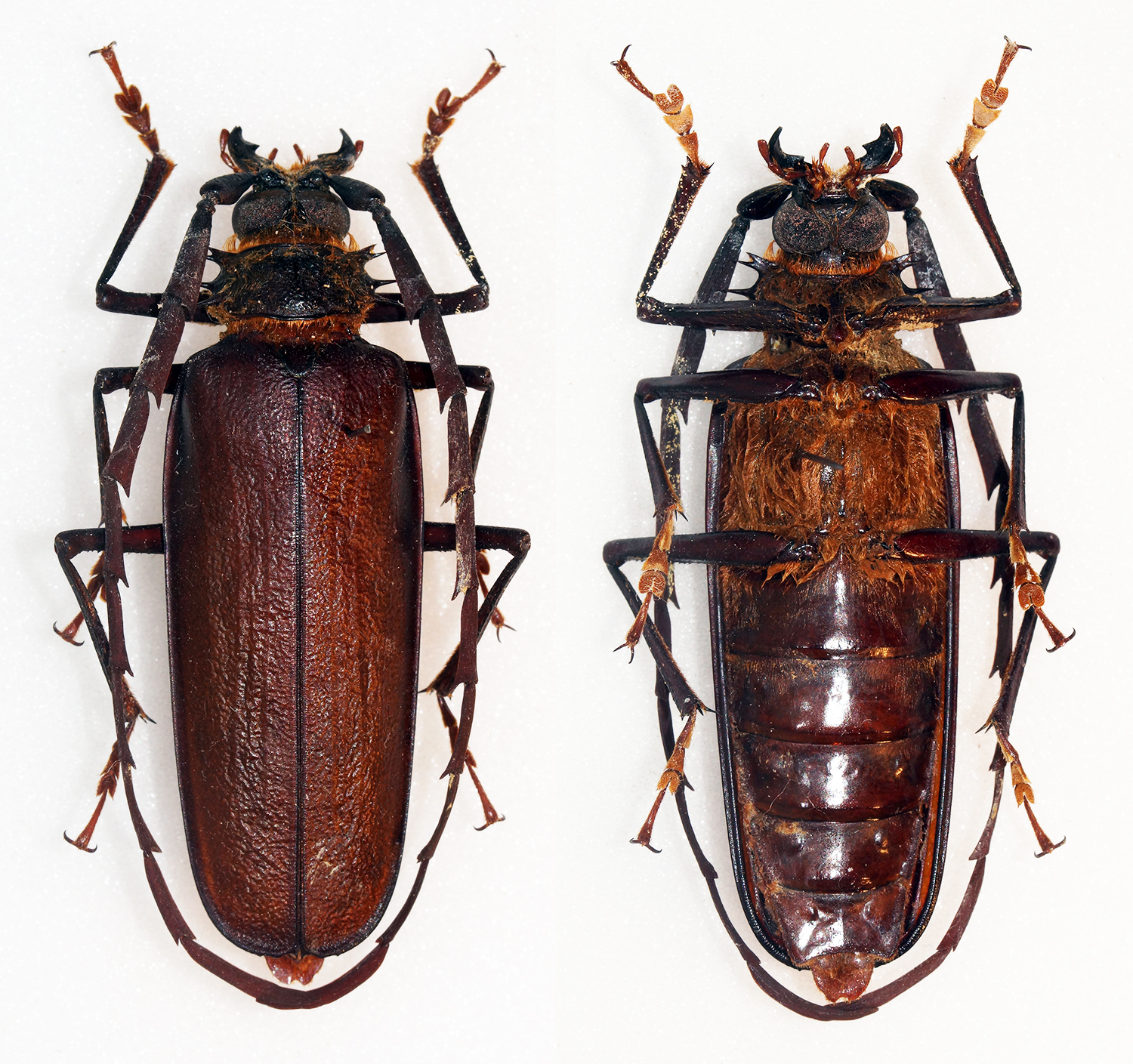

Scientific classification
- Kingdom: Animalia
- Phylum: Arthropoda
- Clade: Pancrustacea
- Class: Insecta
- Order: Coleoptera
- Suborder: Polyphaga
- Infraorder: Cucujiformia
- Family: Cerambycidae
- Genus: Derobrachus
- Species: D. procerus

Binomial name
- Derobrachus procerus Thomson, 1860

= Derobrachus procerus =

Species of beetle

Derobrachus procerus is a species of beetle in the family Cerambycidae. It was described by Thomson in 1860.
