= Derobrachus apterus =

Scientific classification
- Kingdom: Animalia
- Phylum: Arthropoda
- Clade: Pancrustacea
- Class: Insecta
- Order: Coleoptera
- Suborder: Polyphaga
- Infraorder: Cucujiformia
- Family: Cerambycidae
- Genus: Derobrachus
- Species: D. apterus

Binomial name
- Derobrachus apterus Bates, 1879

Species of beetle

Derobrachus apterus is a species of beetle in the family Cerambycidae. It was described by Henry Walter Bates in 1879.
