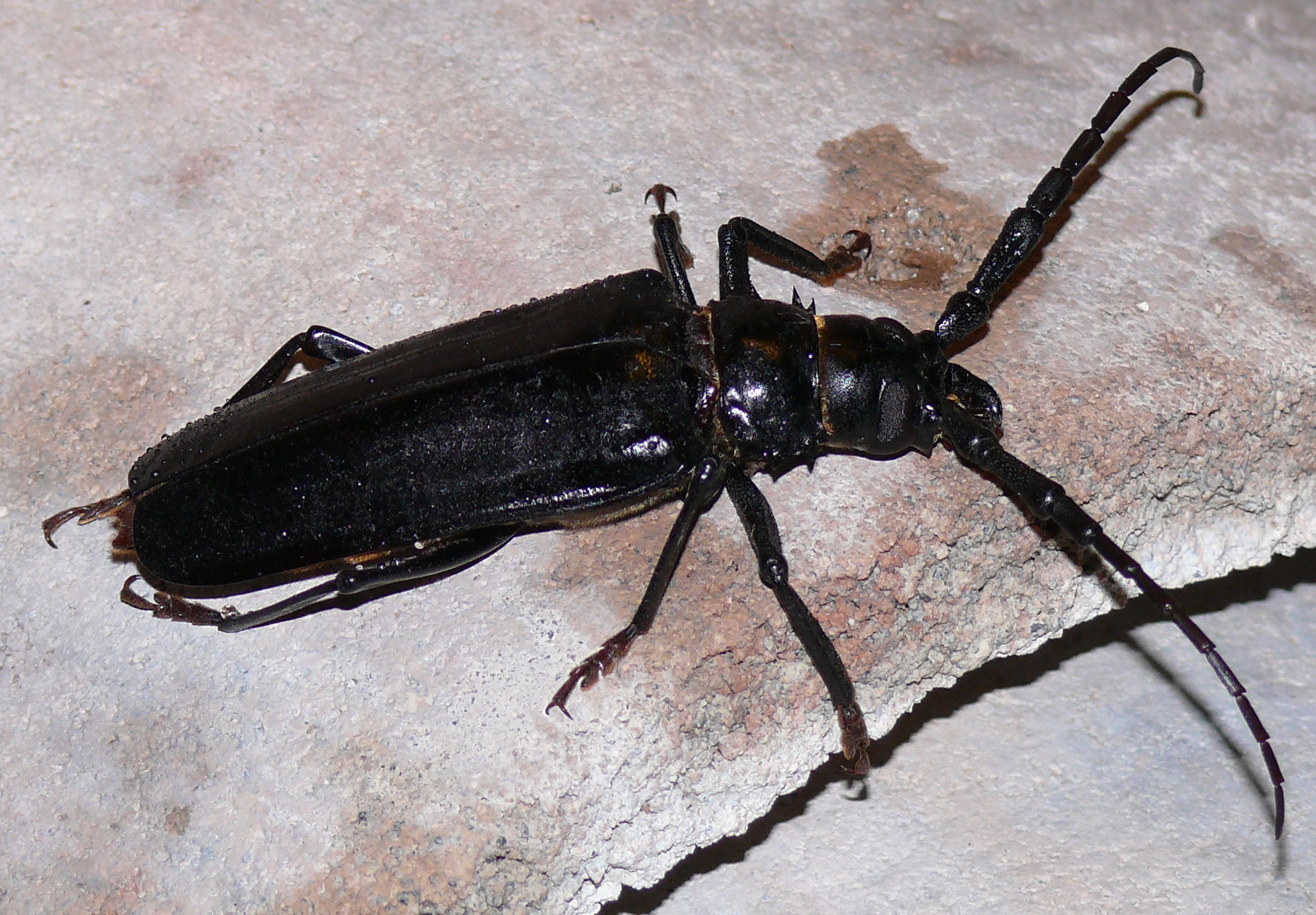

Scientific classification
- Kingdom: Animalia
- Phylum: Arthropoda
- Clade: Pancrustacea
- Class: Insecta
- Order: Coleoptera
- Suborder: Polyphaga
- Infraorder: Cucujiformia
- Family: Cerambycidae
- Genus: Derobrachus
- Species: D. geminatus

Binomial name
- Derobrachus geminatus LeConte, 1853

Synonyms
- Derobrachus forreri Bates, 1884

= Derobrachus geminatus =

Species of beetle

Derobrachus geminatus is a species of beetle in the family Cerambycidae. For over 100 years, this species was confused with the related species Derobrachus hovorei; essentially all literature prior to 2007 therefore uses the name geminatus for the wrong species, while the true geminatus was known under the junior name Derobrachus forreri. It is an uncommon species but fairly large, reaching 70 mm in length, that can be found from southern Arizona and Texas to Sinaloa and Baja California Sur.
