= Derobrachus dohrni =

Scientific classification
- Kingdom: Animalia
- Phylum: Arthropoda
- Clade: Pancrustacea
- Class: Insecta
- Order: Coleoptera
- Suborder: Polyphaga
- Infraorder: Cucujiformia
- Family: Cerambycidae
- Genus: Derobrachus
- Species: D. dohrni

Binomial name
- Derobrachus dohrni Lameere, 1911

Species of beetle

Derobrachus dohrni is a species of beetle in the family Cerambycidae. It was described by Lameere in 1911.
