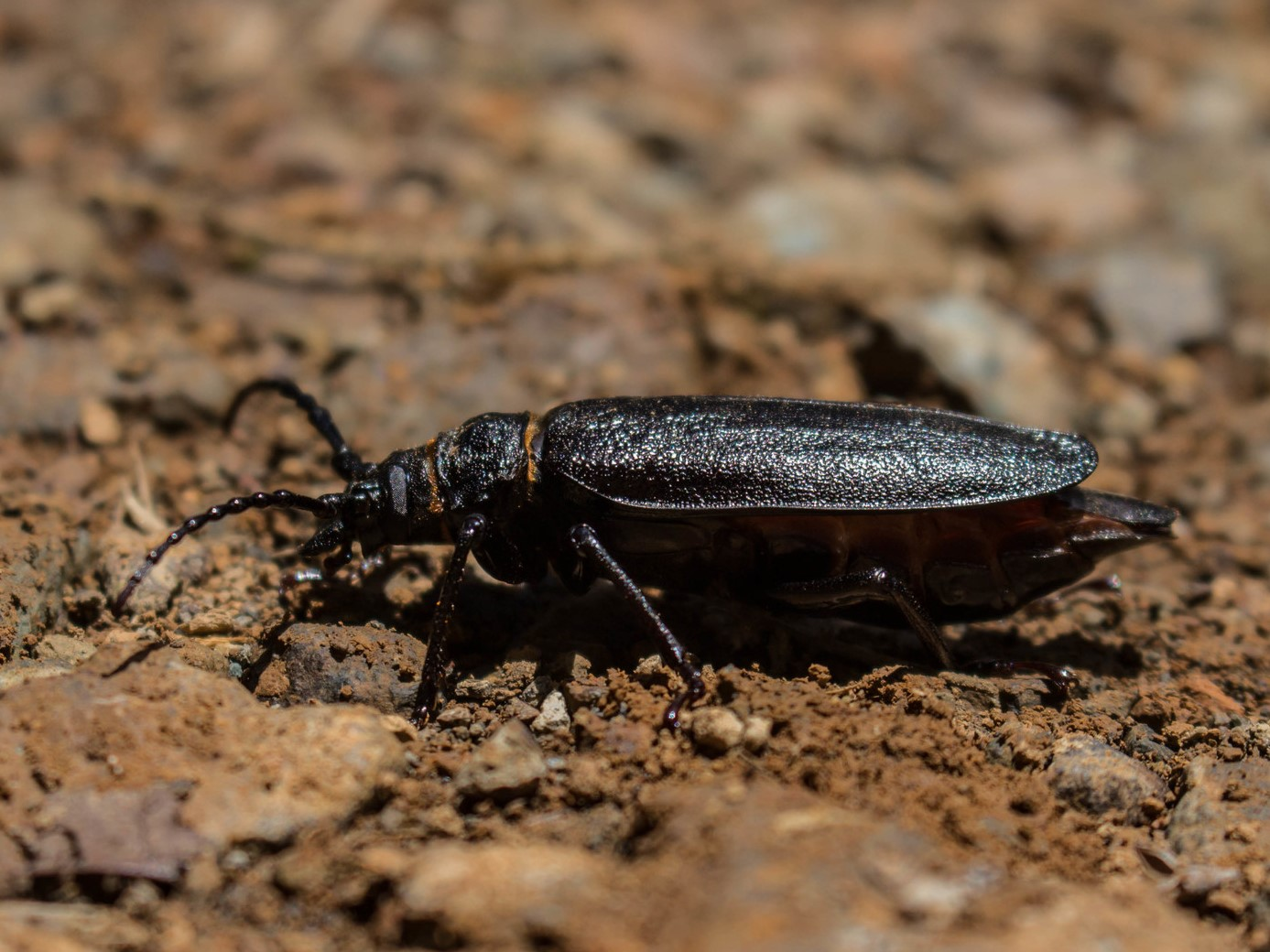

Scientific classification
- Kingdom: Animalia
- Phylum: Arthropoda
- Clade: Pancrustacea
- Class: Insecta
- Order: Coleoptera
- Suborder: Polyphaga
- Infraorder: Cucujiformia
- Family: Cerambycidae
- Genus: Derobrachus
- Species: D. granulatus

Binomial name
- Derobrachus granulatus Bates, 1884

= Derobrachus granulatus =

Species of beetle

Derobrachus granulatus is a species of beetle in the family Cerambycidae. It was described by Henry Walter Bates in 1884.
