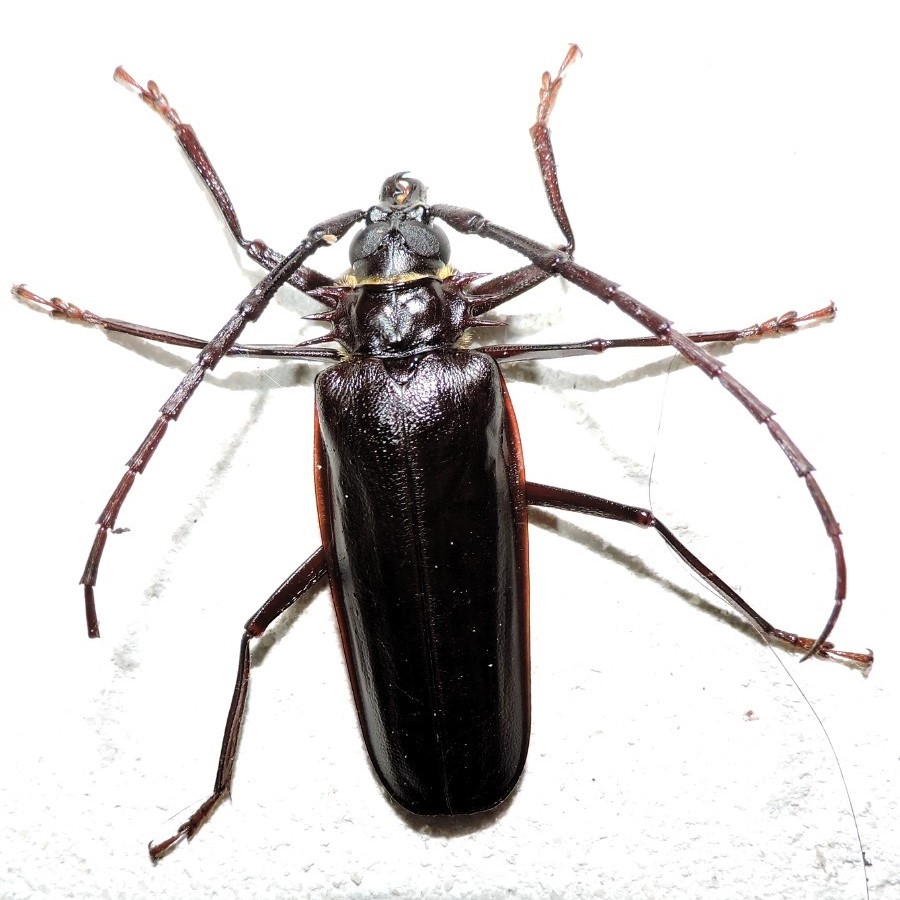

Scientific classification
- Kingdom: Animalia
- Phylum: Arthropoda
- Clade: Pancrustacea
- Class: Insecta
- Order: Coleoptera
- Suborder: Polyphaga
- Infraorder: Cucujiformia
- Family: Cerambycidae
- Genus: Derobrachus
- Species: D. megacles

Binomial name
- Derobrachus megacles Bates, 1884

= Derobrachus megacles =

Species of beetle

Derobrachus megacles is a species of beetle in the family Cerambycidae. It was described by Henry Walter Bates in 1884. It is found in Mexico and Guatemala.

== Description ==
This is a large brown beetle about 64 mm long with antennae that are about half the length of the body. There are short spines on the thorax. The elytra are brown.
