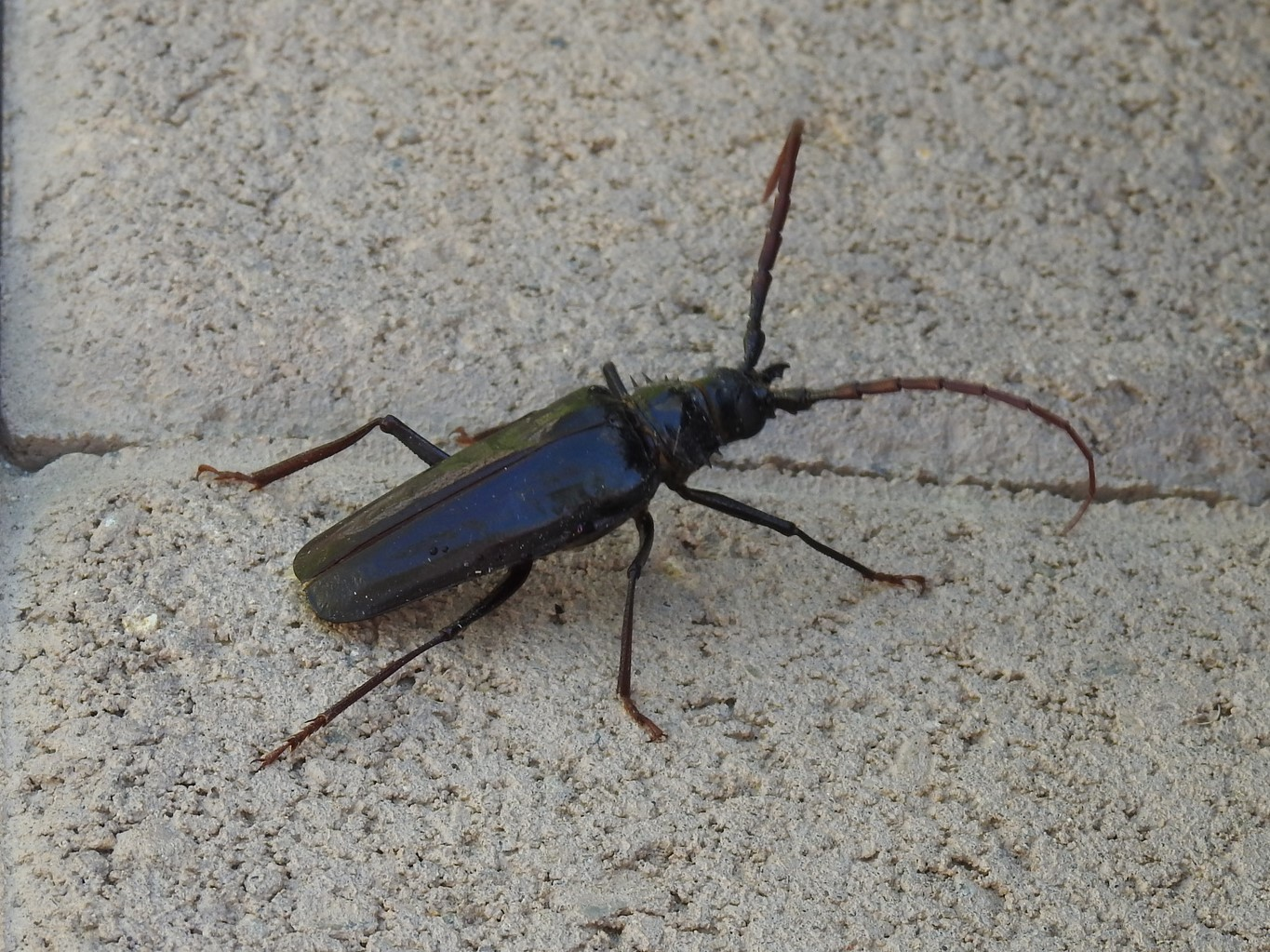

Scientific classification
- Kingdom: Animalia
- Phylum: Arthropoda
- Clade: Pancrustacea
- Class: Insecta
- Order: Coleoptera
- Suborder: Polyphaga
- Infraorder: Cucujiformia
- Family: Cerambycidae
- Genus: Derobrachus
- Species: D. leechi

Binomial name
- Derobrachus leechi Chemsak & Linsley, 1977

= Derobrachus leechi =

Species of beetle

Derobrachus leechi is a species of beetle in the family Cerambycidae. It was described by Chemsak & Linsley in 1977.
