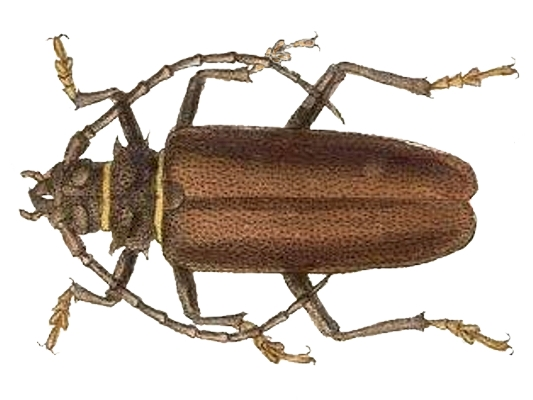

Scientific classification
- Kingdom: Animalia
- Phylum: Arthropoda
- Clade: Pancrustacea
- Class: Insecta
- Order: Coleoptera
- Suborder: Polyphaga
- Infraorder: Cucujiformia
- Family: Cerambycidae
- Genus: Derobrachus
- Species: D. asperatus

Binomial name
- Derobrachus asperatus Bates, 1878

= Derobrachus asperatus =

Species of beetle

Derobrachus asperatus is a species of beetle in the family Cerambycidae. It was described by Henry Walter Bates in 1878.
