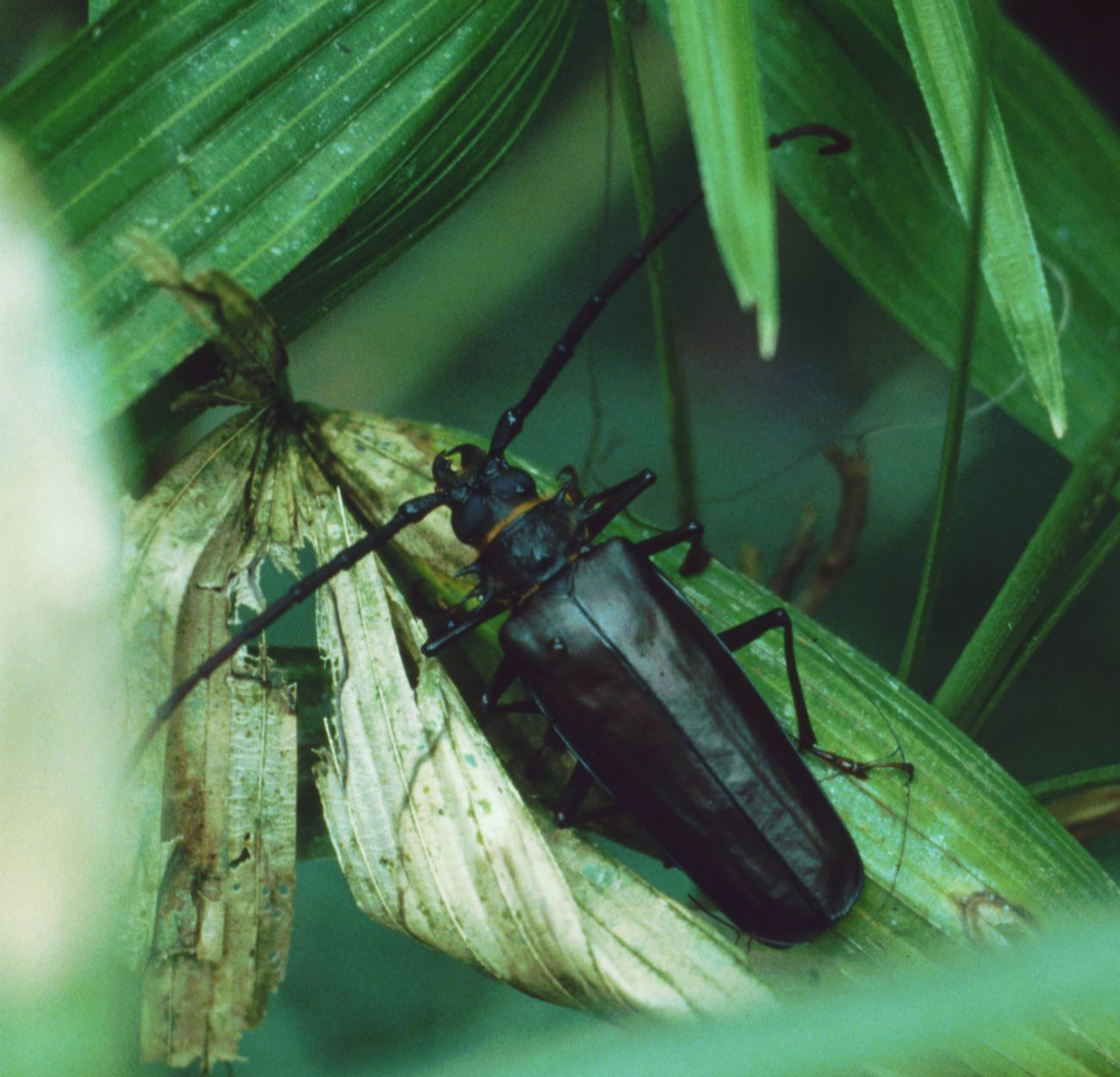

Scientific classification
- Kingdom: Animalia
- Phylum: Arthropoda
- Clade: Pancrustacea
- Class: Insecta
- Order: Coleoptera
- Suborder: Polyphaga
- Infraorder: Cucujiformia
- Family: Cerambycidae
- Genus: Derobrachus
- Species: D. longicornis

Binomial name
- Derobrachus longicornis (Bates, 1872)

= Derobrachus longicornis =

Species of beetle

Derobrachus longicornis is a species of beetle in the family Cerambycidae. It was described by Henry Walter Bates in 1872.
