= Coenobita pseudorugosus =

Scientific classification
- Kingdom: Animalia
- Phylum: Arthropoda
- Clade: Pancrustacea
- Class: Malacostraca
- Order: Decapoda
- Suborder: Pleocyemata
- Infraorder: Anomura
- Family: Coenobitidae
- Genus: Coenobita
- Species: C. pseudorugosus

Binomial name
- Coenobita pseudorugosus Nakasone, 1988

Species of crustacean

Coenobita pseudorugosus is a species of terrestrial hermit crab, family Coenobitidae.

== Discovery ==
First described in 1988, C. pseudorugosus is known to occupy the Philippines, Central Sulawesi province of Indonesia, and Southwest Madagascar.

As suggested by its name, this species closely resembles the morphology and behavior of the more common C. rugosus. The very subtle differences may have delayed their identification as a distinct species.

== Morphology ==
When first described, the adult (terrestrial, non-larval form) were noted to have shield length (i.e. the anterior-posterior length of the dorsal cephalothorax carapace) between 5.6 and 12.1 mm. Subsequent surveys described their shield length as anywhere between 5 mm to 30 mm, and body weight of 100 mg to about 25 g. Their coloration may vary from light-to-dark or reddish brown, to pink, to blue-gray. The anterior third of the shield may be marked with dark transverse stripe or paired dark patches (associated with posterior longitudinal stripes), with additional scattered dark colorations in ventral aspect of ocular peduncle as well as parts of second and third pereiopods (walking legs).

Like all members of the Coenobitidae family, C. pseudorugosus’ left cheliped (i.e., first pereiopod) is notably larger than the right. The geometry and coloration of the chela, or pincer, is distinct from C. rugosus: the inferior margin of the propodus is distally straight and proximally angulated, approximating an irregular pentagonal shape. This is in contrast with C. rugosus, with convexly curved inferior margin of the propodus, forming a more rounded quadrangular shape. C. pseudorugosus specimens were initially noted to lack a dark brown patch on the lateral aspect of the chela, as commonly seen with C. rugosus; however, a subsequent study asserted that the dark patches on the chela are inconsistently present in individuals of either species.

Their left third pereiopod has a flattened dactylus and propodus, with a longitudinal crest; this is very similar to that of C. rugosus, but the lateral and dorsal surfaces are comparatively wider in C. pseudorugosus. Among males, the fifth pereiopod bears sexual tubes that are slender and significantly longer on the right side. This asymmetry is in contrast to the male sexual tubes of C. rugosus, with symmetric or slight asymmetric (right longer than left) sexual tubes. This subtle difference, together with the more obvious chela appearance, are the two documented morphologic features that distinguish C. pseudorugosus from C. rugosus.

== Geographical distribution ==
Coenobita pseudorugosus was first described in Cebu Island, Philippines, and has also been studied in Southwest Madagascar, as well as in Sumatra and central Sulawesi province of Indonesia.

== Behavior and ecology ==
Coenobita pseudorugosus occupy the supralittoral region, in conjunction with other terrestrial hermit crabs such as C. cavipes, C. rugosus, and C. violascens. As with all terrestrial hermit crabs, they are subject to limited availability of empty gastropod shells that are suitable as a shelter, and thus an individual must compete with conspecifics as well as other species of terrestrial hermit crabs. Though described as preferring shells with short-to-mid height spire, they nonetheless occupy a wide variety of available shells.

Although some subtle, species-specific shell and refuge preference has been reported, they closely occupy the same ecological niche as C. rugosus; despite the overlap, the niche difference is somewhat more pronounced when compared to C. cavipes (which preferentially seek mangroves). Similar to C. rugosus, they may seek refuge in fallen leaves under bushes, mangrove roots, algal deposits along the shoreline, under boulders and between rock crevices, and even taking advantage of anthropogenic constructs (such as tombs). In unfavorable climatic conditions they may burrow into the ground as deep as 5 cm. C. pseudorugosus regularly participate in short range migration near the shoreline to forage and seek empty gastropod shells, at times exceeding 100 meters per day. Although they are generally nocturnal in behavior and most active between dusk to after dawn, they are occasionally seen migrating during the daytime as well. They generally become more active during spring tide and lower wind speed.
