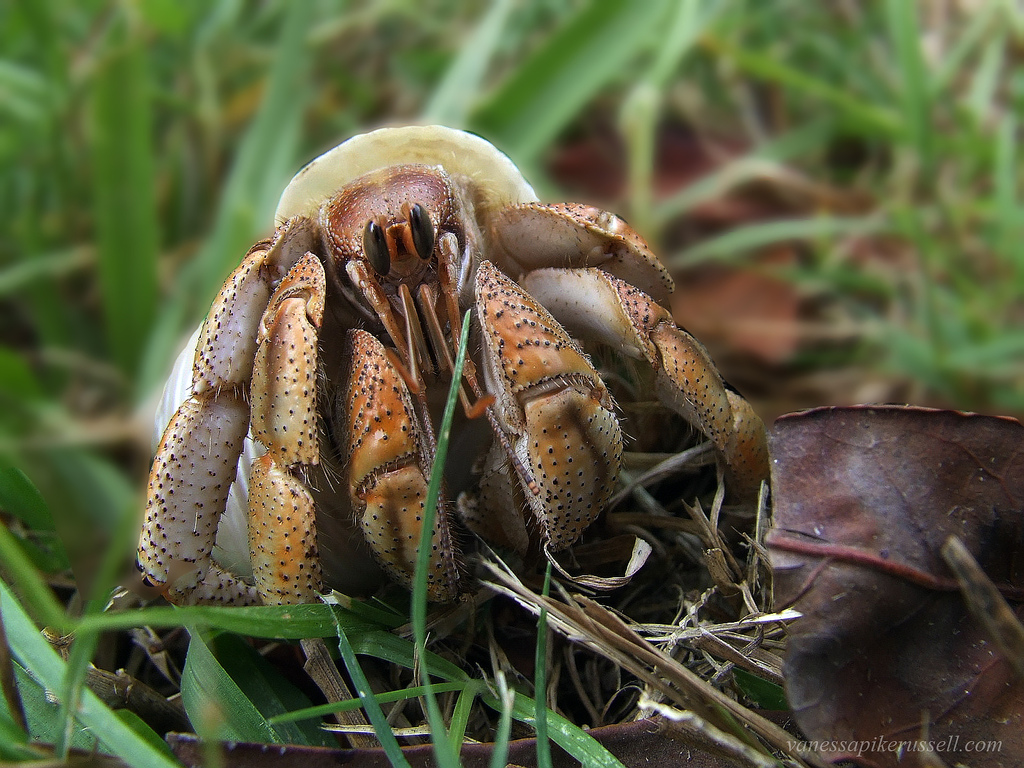

Scientific classification
- Kingdom: Animalia
- Phylum: Arthropoda
- Class: Malacostraca
- Order: Decapoda
- Suborder: Pleocyemata
- Infraorder: Anomura
- Family: Coenobitidae
- Genus: Coenobita
- Species: C. variabilis

Binomial name
- Coenobita variabilis McCulloch, 1909

= Australian land hermit crab =

Species of crustacean

The Australian land hermit crab (Coenobita variabilis) is a terrestrial hermit crab species, native to Australia. It is a nocturnal, omnivorous crustacean. They are gregarious and thrive in tropical areas near water.

== Distribution ==
The Australian land hermit crab is endemic to northern parts of Australia including northern Western Australia, Northern Territory and northern Queensland.

== Biology ==
The Australian land hermit crab (Coenobita variabilis) reaches a carapace length of 40 millimetres (1.6 in). They closely resemble the Pacific hermit crab (Coenobita compressus) in appearance and they both have a shortened aquatic development stage.

Australian land hermit crabs are light brown to pale brown in colour, with two dark ovals on the front of the head. Their eyestalks are long and are the same colour as the body. Each claw has a dark vertical stripe. They have dark brown spots all over the legs. The abdomen is short and fat. They hide by camouflaging and pick shells that help them blend into their surroundings, using their vision to find the best match.

== Shell preference ==
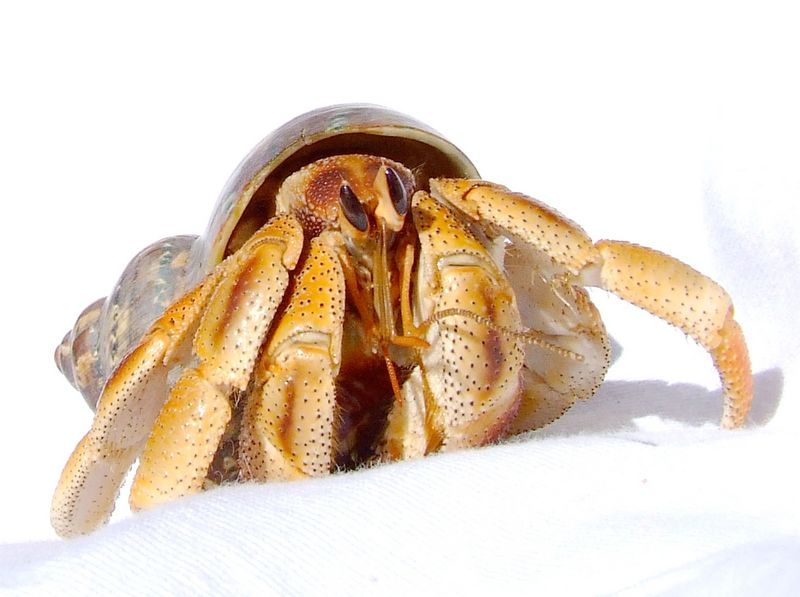
Photo of a Coenobita variabilis land hermit crab from Australia.

The preferred seashells of C. variabilis include Babylonia, Nerita, Phasianella, Thais, Tonna and Turban seashells. They are also found to be fond of several varieties of land snail shells such as Aratan snail and rice snail.

Gastropod shells used by Coenobita variabilis

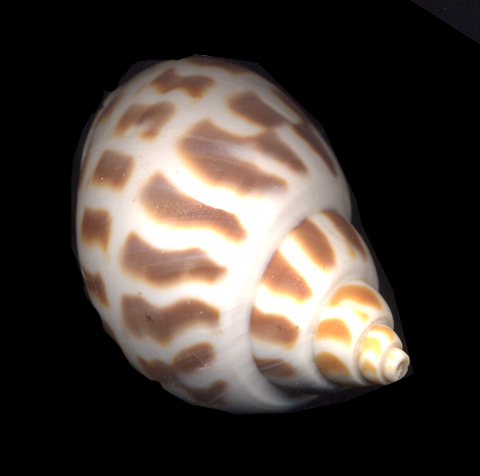
Babylonia

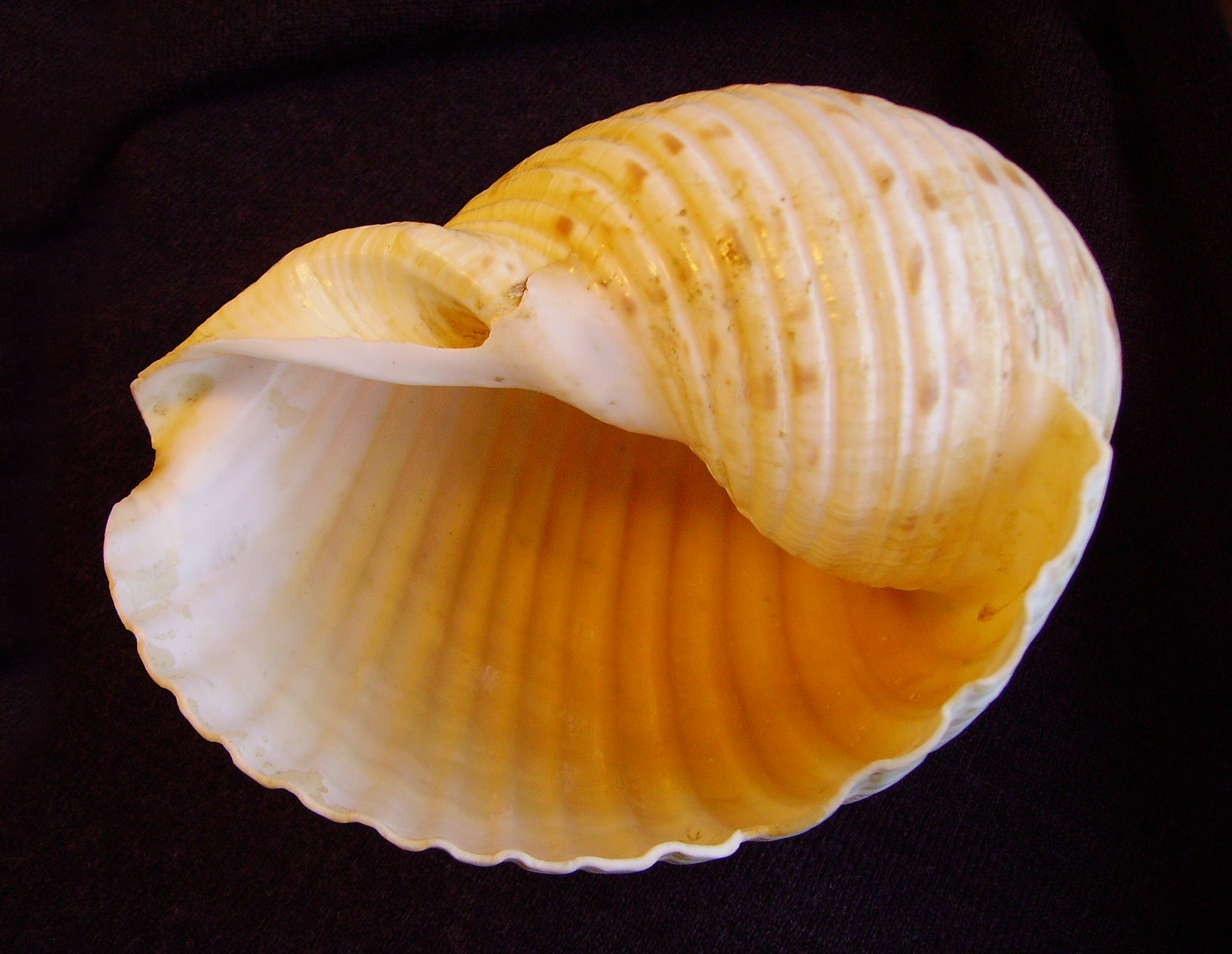
Tonna

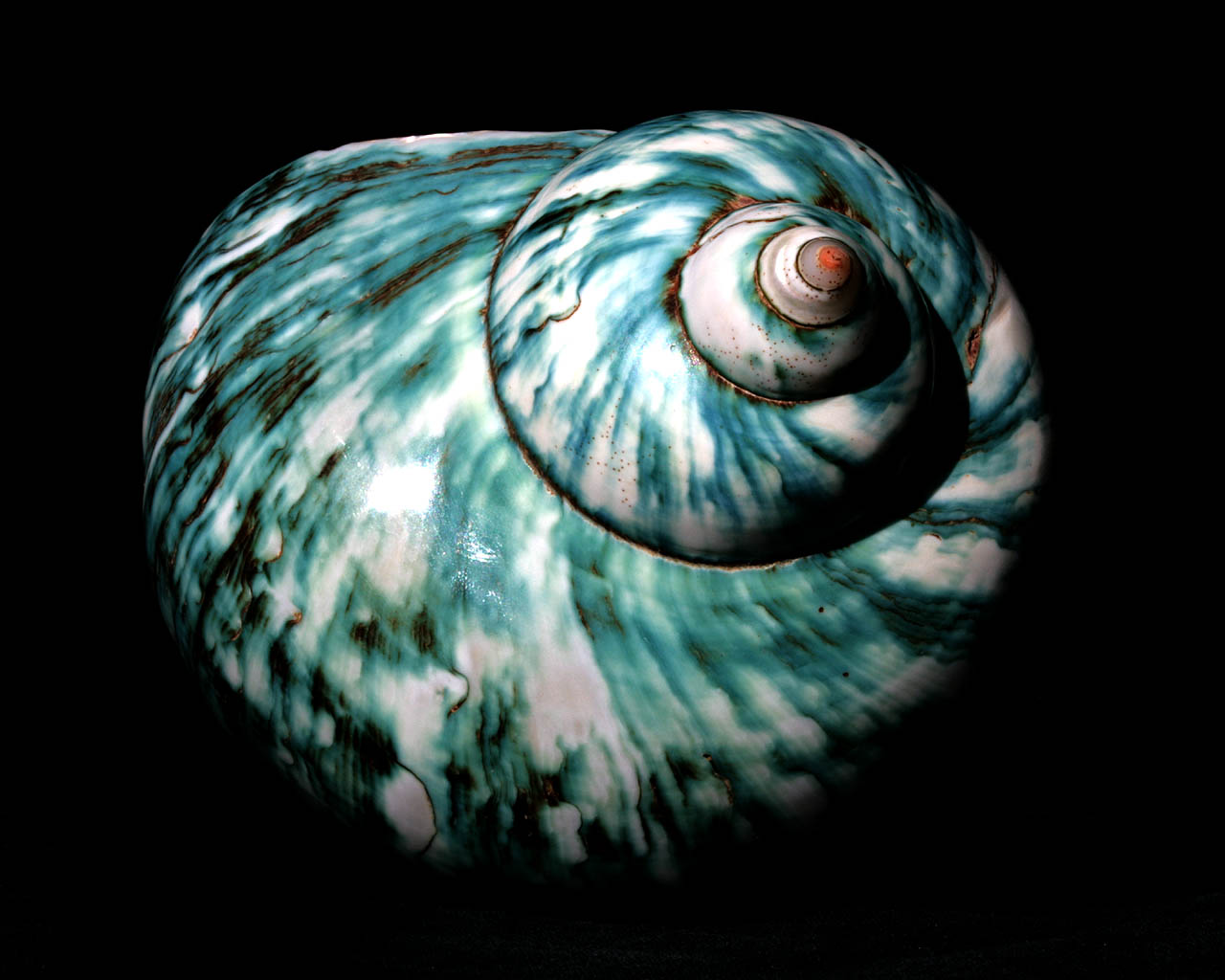
Turbo

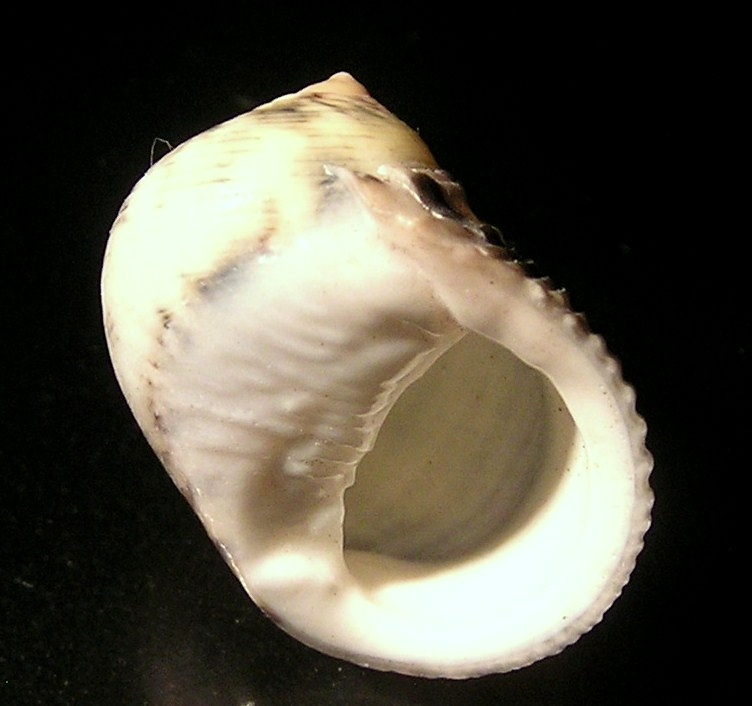
Nerita

As the hermit crabs grow, they must exchange their shell for a larger one. Since intact gastropod shells are not an unlimited resource, there is frequently strong competition for the available shells, with hermit crabs fighting over shells. The availability of empty shells depends on the abundance of the gastropods and hermit crabs, but most importantly on the frequency of organisms that prey on gastropods but leave the shells intact. A hermit crab with a shell which is too tight cannot grow as fast as hermit crabs with well-fitting shells, and is more likely to be eaten. Although hermit crabs need to change shells regularly, they will not abandon their old shell unless they have a larger and newer one to change into and unless they feel safe. Hermit crab does not have hard shells to protect themselves like other crabs. Instead, they have gastropod shell, or they would use an object.These crabs only change shells when the difference in color is big enough, balancing safety and camouflage.
