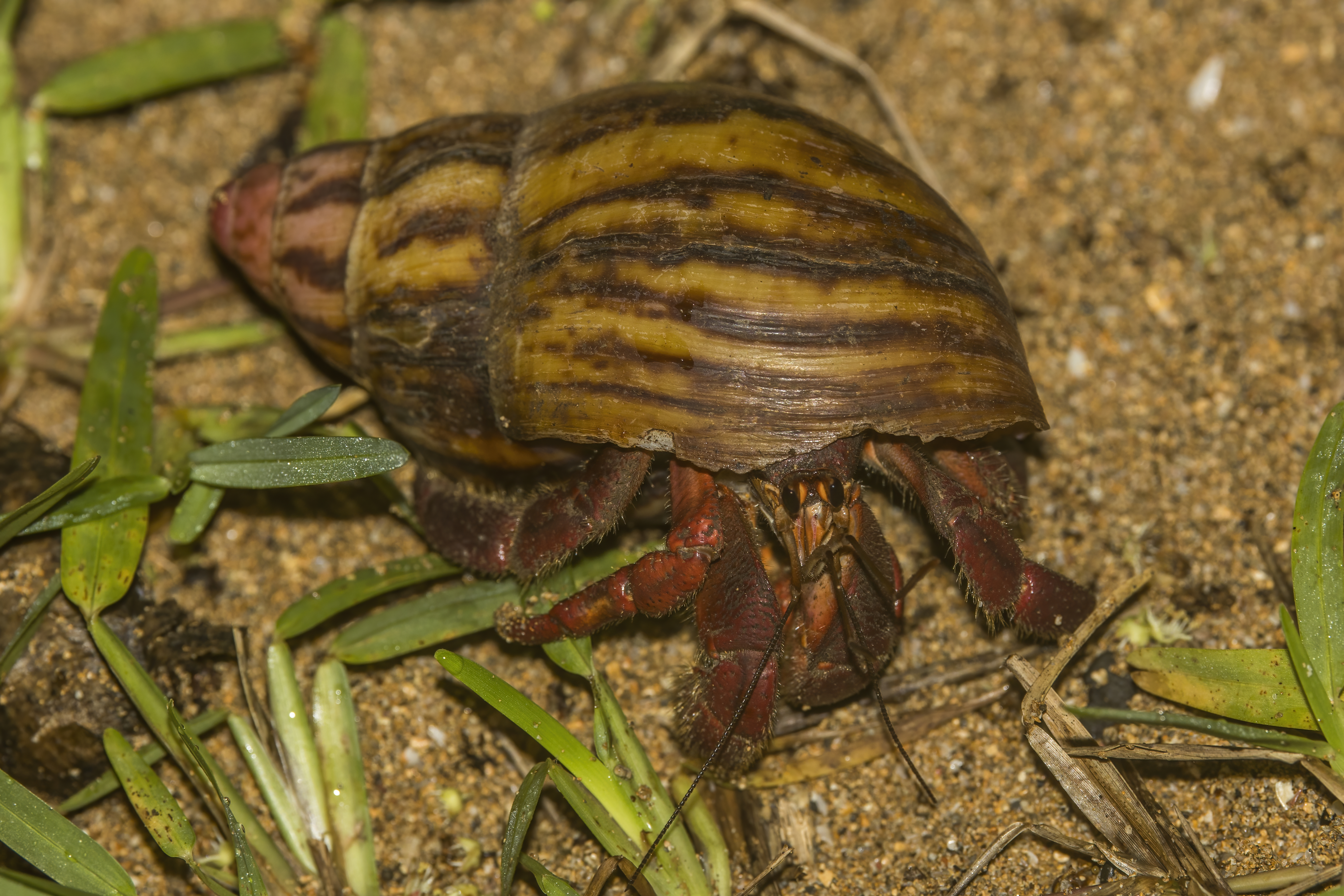

Scientific classification
- Domain: Eukaryota
- Kingdom: Animalia
- Phylum: Arthropoda
- Class: Malacostraca
- Order: Decapoda
- Suborder: Pleocyemata
- Infraorder: Anomura
- Family: Coenobitidae
- Genus: Coenobita
- Species: C. rubescens

Binomial name
- Coenobita rubescens Greeff, 1884

= Coenobita rubescens =

Species of crustacean

Coenobita rubescens is a species of terrestrial (land-living) hermit crab, family Coenobitidae.

They are the only known terrestrial hermit crab species on the Atlantic coast of western Africa. They were first described by the German zoologist Richard Greeff in the West African islands of São Tomé and Rolas, after initially being misidentified as Coenobita rugosus. They are able to venture far inland, in altitudes exceeding 800 m (2,600 ft). In spite of this, the ovigerous females must release the fertilized eggs in the ocean for the larvae to develop (as with all known species of terrestrial hermit crabs).

The species is presumably named for the dark red coloration of their exoskeleton. Under Greeff's original observation, this species has a more elongated antennule and the left cheliped lacks the stridulation ridges (as such seen in C. rugosus), leading to the distinction.

At approximately 48 g (1.7 oz), they are rather small by Coenobita standards. As with other terrestrial hermit crab species, they are omnivorous. There are reports of this species carrying a sea urchin test in place of a more typical gastropod shell.
