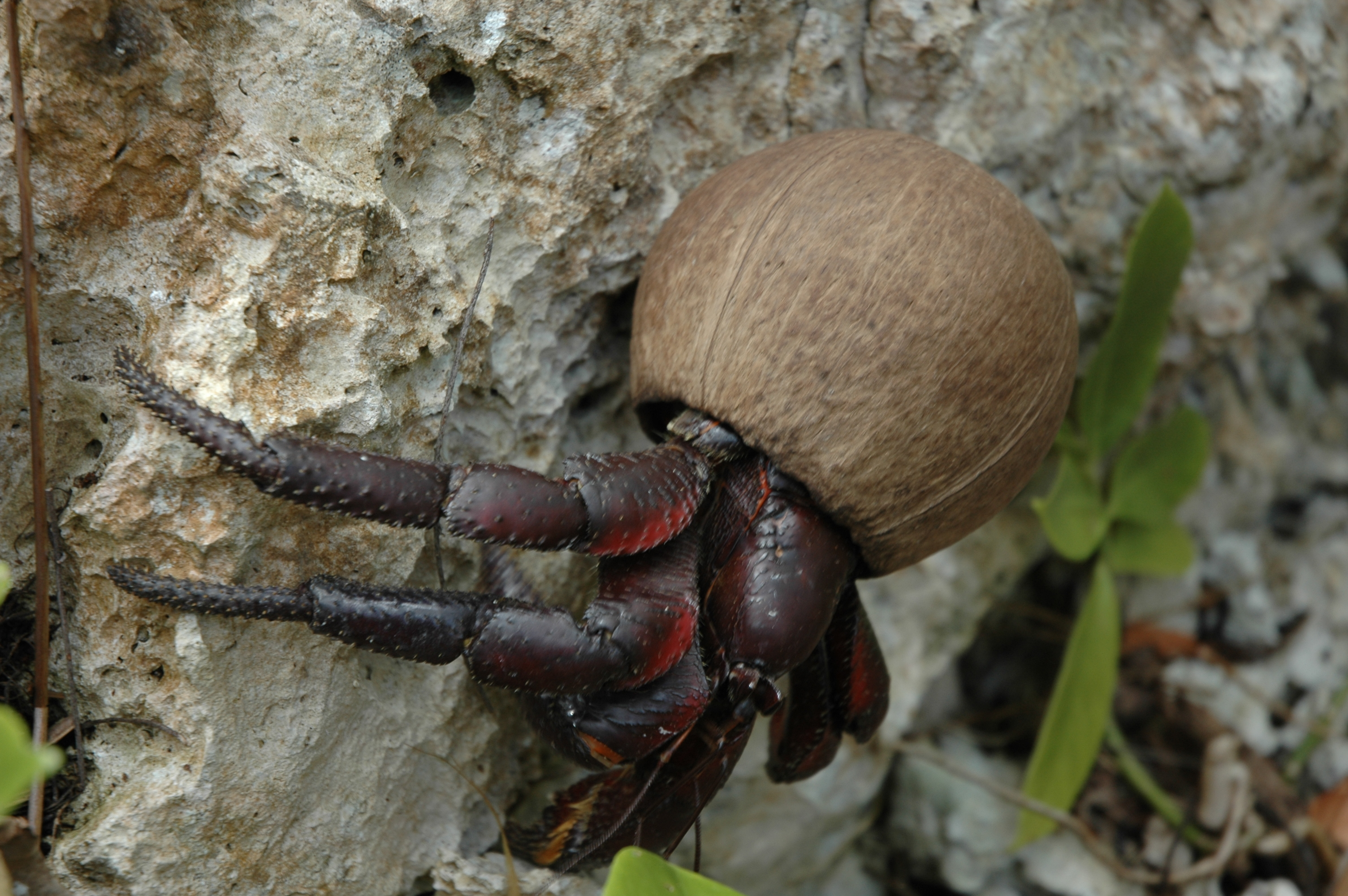

Scientific classification
- Domain: Eukaryota
- Kingdom: Animalia
- Phylum: Arthropoda
- Class: Malacostraca
- Order: Decapoda
- Suborder: Pleocyemata
- Infraorder: Anomura
- Family: Coenobitidae
- Genus: Coenobita
- Species: C. spinosus

Binomial name
- Coenobita spinosus Milne-Edwards, 1837

= Coenobita spinosus =

Species of crab

Coenobita spinosus is one of the sixteen species of terrestrial hermit crabs.

== Range and habitat ==
C. spinosus can be found on Polynesian islands, Melanesia, Micronesia, the Mariana Islands and the northern coast of Australia, New Caledonia, Wallis and Futuna, and Henderson Island in the Pitcairn Islands where it has been observed to use plastic debris for protection.

C. spinosus notably lives in forests and wetlands, but can also be found on beaches and in lagoons.

== Anatomy ==
They possess long hairy spines on their legs; although some other species have these spines, none are as long as C. spinosus.
