= Coenobita longitarsis =

Scientific classification
- Kingdom: Animalia
- Phylum: Arthropoda
- Clade: Pancrustacea
- Class: Malacostraca
- Order: Decapoda
- Suborder: Pleocyemata
- Infraorder: Anomura
- Family: Coenobitidae
- Genus: Coenobita
- Species: C. longitarsis

Binomial name
- Coenobita longitarsis de Man, 1902

Species of crustacean

Coenobita longitarsis is a species of terrestrial hermit crab, of the family Coenobitidae.

== Discovery ==
This species was first described by the Dutch zoologist, Johannes Govertus de Man, in the 1902 publication entitled: Die von Herrn Professor Kükenthal im Indischen Archipel gesammelten; Dekapoden und Stomatopoden ("The Decapods and Stomatopods collected by Professor Kükenthal in the Indian Archipelago"). Two female specimens were collected in the Maluku Islands of Indonesia (possibly near Ternate), in which the author noted the specimens' remarkably long and slender walking legs (2nd and 3rd pereiopods) when compared against other Coenobita species, such as Coenobita spinosus or Coenobita violascens.

For the remainder of the 20th century and early 21st century, this species received passing mentions in scientific literature but was never studied directly, leading to some uncertainty on its very existence. However, a description of the species was revisited in 2023, based on specimens collected in Maluku, Indonesia; and New Britain, Papua New Guinea. The relative rarity of this species may explain the long hiatus in documented reports.

== Physical characteristics ==
While C. longitarsus appears grossly similar to other terrestrial hermit crabs occupying the Pacific and Indian Oceans, a unique feature is the long and slender second and third pereiopods (i.e., two pairs of walking legs). The original description notes that the length of the third right pereiopod in one specimen was longer than the body length of the specimen itself. One explanation for this distinct morphology is an adaptation toward local terrestrial snail shell availability (see below: #Behavior and Ecology).

Similar to all Coenobita species, the left cheliped (i.e., the first pereiopod, or the claw) is larger than the right cheliped, assuming no prior limb loss and regeneration. The left cheliped lacks the stridulating ridges that are seen in some terrestrial hermit crabs, and the outer surface of the palm is smooth (as are the propodus and dactylus of the left third pereiopod). This contrasts with the spinulose tubercles or granules seen in the left cheliped of C. spinosus and C. violascens, respectively.

The shield length (i.e. the anterior-posterior length of the rostral section of cephalothorax, measured dorsally) is about 1.4-1.5 times longer than it is broad, with the shield length about 10-13 mm. In males, the left coxae of the 5th pereiopods (where the paired male reproductive organ resides) is slightly larger than the right side, but bilaterally thick and short. A developed sex tube was not noted. Ocular peduncles are compressed/flattened, not unlike those of many other terrestrial hermit crabs such as C. rugosus, C. pseudorugosus, and C. compressus.

In terms of coloration, the carapace may range from reddish-purple (anteriorly), to reddish-yellow (posteriorly), to brownish-gray. The pereiopods are generally greenish or blueish in coloration with red, orange, or white dactyli. Juvenile specimens were noted to have pale reddish-yellow coloration with blue-tinted dactyli of the left third pereiopod. The cornea of the eye is black.

== Behavior and ecology ==
Coenobita longitarsus can be found in inland forests of Maluku, Indonesia; New Britain, East New Britain Province, Papua New Guinea; Sudest Island, Milne Bay Province, Papua New Guinea; San Fernando, Sibuyan Island, central Philippines; and Guam. They may be found as far as 10 km from the coast and at an altitude of 850 m above sea level (and in other locations, over a kilometer inland).

This species was noted to inhabit shells of terrestrial snails, identified as Discoconcha isis and Lamarckiella zeus. These snails have disc-like, flattened, and round shells compared to the more conical Turbo shells inhabited by other Coenobita species. The authors speculate that the distinctly slender morphology of C. longitarsis may be an evolutionary adaptation toward the use of forest snail shells as a vital resource.
