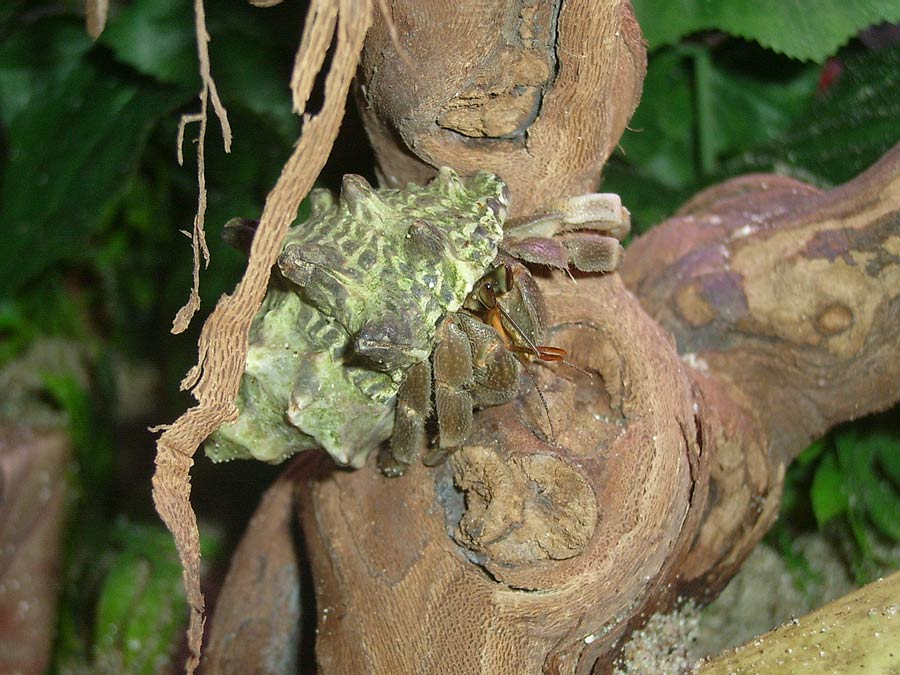

Scientific classification
- Kingdom: Animalia
- Phylum: Arthropoda
- Clade: Pancrustacea
- Class: Malacostraca
- Order: Decapoda
- Suborder: Pleocyemata
- Infraorder: Anomura
- Family: Coenobitidae
- Genus: Coenobita
- Species: C. rugosus

Binomial name
- Coenobita rugosus H. Milne-Edwards, 1837

= Coenobita rugosus =

Species of crustacean

Coenobita rugosus is a species of land hermit crab native to Indonesia, Australia and the east African coast to the south west Pacific.

C. rugosus has four walking legs, a small pincer, a large pincer, and antennae. When threatened C. rugosus is able to make a 'chirping' sound by rubbing its large pincer against its shell as a stridulatory apparatus.

C. rugosus vary in colour depending on nutritional intake and common colours include green, brown and tan, but black, white, pink, and blue have also been observed. They can be differentiated from other species of land hermit crabs by the pronounced striations (stitch marks) on their large pincer. Coenobita compressus and Coenobita perlatus also possess these striations to a lesser extent but can easily be distinguished from C. rugosus by size and colour; especially in the case of the C. perlatus which is a striking red colour as an adult.

They can be 5 centimetres (2.0 in) in length and their eyestalks are sandy in colour and may have a brown stripe on the bottom of them. The bottom pair of the second antena are light orange in colour. Their big claw has 7 ridges on the upper part and there is usually hair on the inside of both claws. On the last pair of walking legs, on the second segment, it is flattened and the colour is lighter. The abdomen is short and fat.

As with other species of land hermit crabs C. rugosus are scavengers and will consume plants, dead fish, fruit and other detritus.
