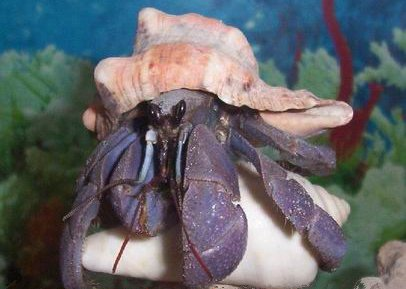

Scientific classification
- Domain: Eukaryota
- Kingdom: Animalia
- Phylum: Arthropoda
- Class: Malacostraca
- Order: Decapoda
- Suborder: Pleocyemata
- Infraorder: Anomura
- Family: Coenobitidae
- Genus: Coenobita
- Species: C. violascens

Binomial name
- Coenobita violascens Heller, 1862

= Coenobita violascens =

Species of crustacean

Coenobita violascens is a species of land hermit crab from family Coenobitidae. It is native to the Indonesia, Nicobar Islands, Thailand, Cambodia, Philippines, and Tanzania.
