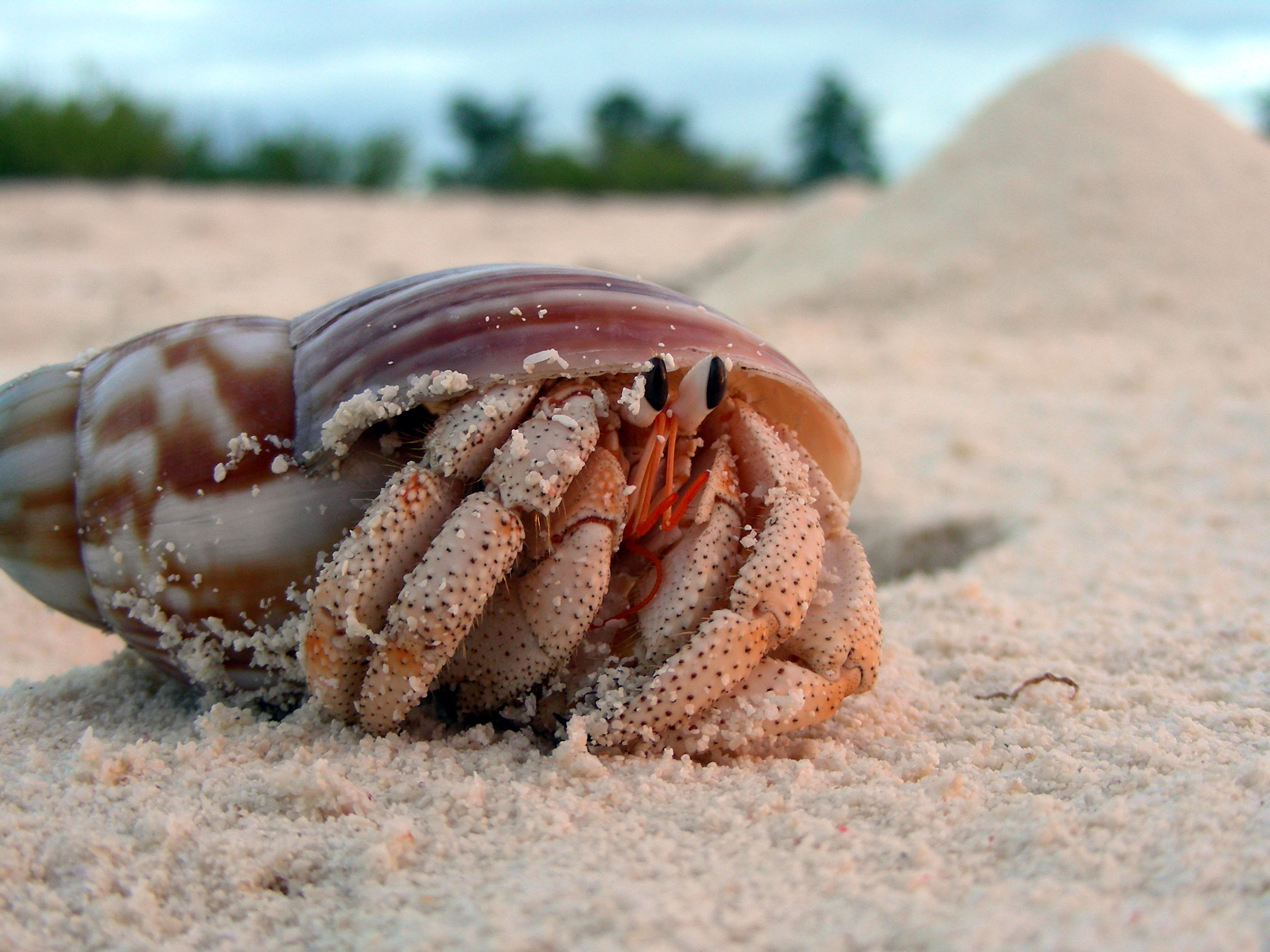
- Coenobita perlatus
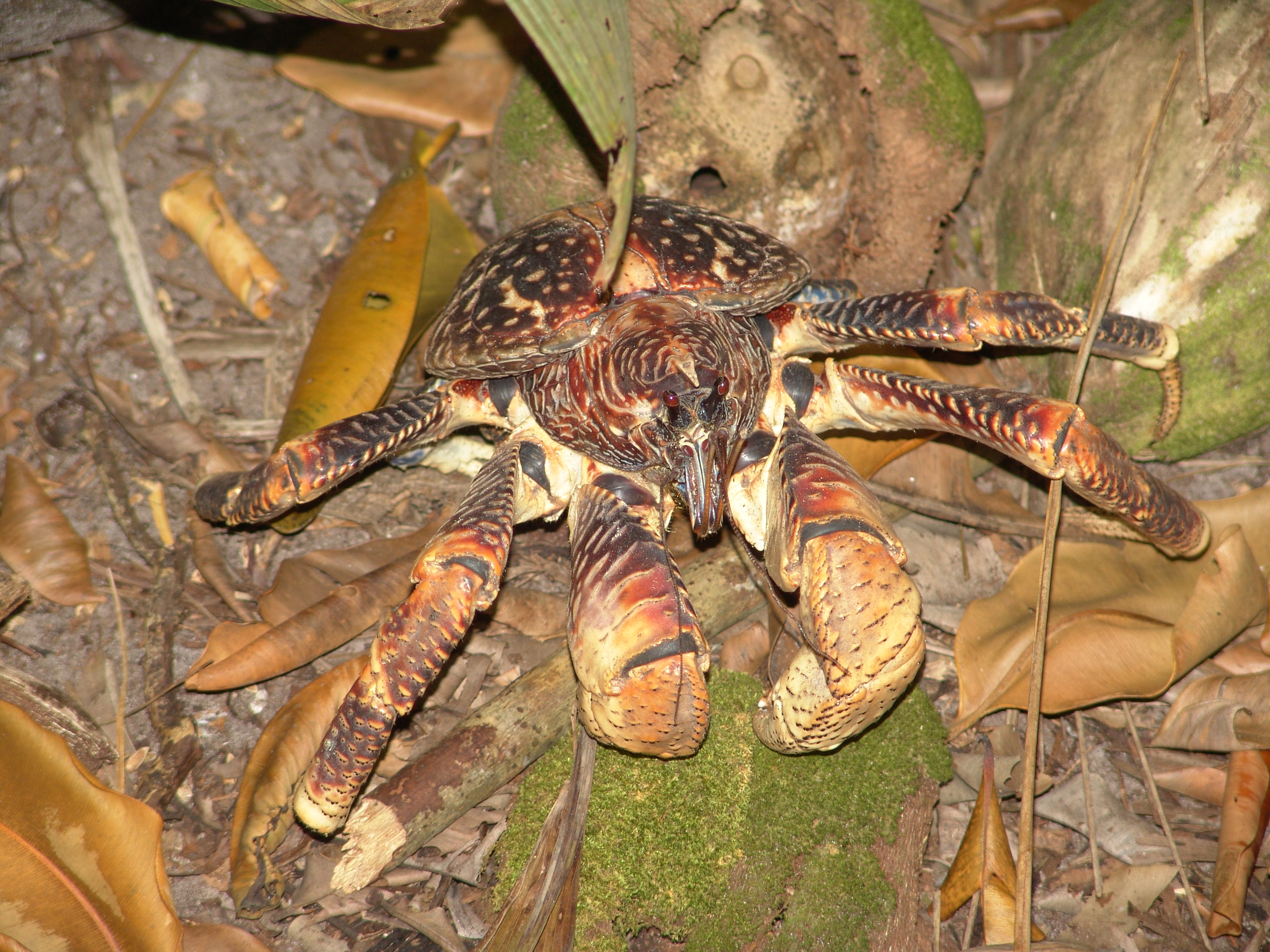
- Coconut crab, Birgus latro

Scientific classification
- Kingdom: Animalia
- Phylum: Arthropoda
- Class: Malacostraca
- Order: Decapoda
- Suborder: Pleocyemata
- Infraorder: Anomura
- Superfamily: Paguroidea
- Family: Coenobitidae; Dana, 1851

Genera
- Birgus; Coenobita

= Coenobitidae =

Family of crustaceans

The Coenobitidae are the family of terrestrial hermit crabs, widely known for their land-living habits as adults. They are found in coastal tropical regions around the world and require access to the ocean to breed.

Although coenobitids are fully terrestrial as adults, they spend their marine life as planktonic larvae. Female coenobitids return to the sea to hatch their eggs and their larvae develop through planktonic zoeal stages to a megalopa, in a similar way as the marine hermit crabs. Just like these species, after settlement, terrestrial hermit crabs megalopae recognize and co-opt gastropods shells, before migrating into the land and molting to the first crab stage.

The 18 species are placed in two genera:

Image	Genus	Living species
	Coenobita Latreille, 1829	Coenobita brevimanus Dana, 1852; Coenobita carnescens Dana, 1851; Coenobita cavipes Stimpson, 1858; Coenobita clypeatus (Fabricius, 1787); Coenobita compressus H. Milne-Edwards, 1836; Coenobita longitarsis De Man, 1902; Coenobita olivieri Owen, 1839; Coenobita perlatus H. Milne-Edwards, 1837; Coenobita pseudorugosus Nakasone, 1988; Coenobita purpureus Stimpson, 1858; Coenobita rubescens Greeff, 1884; Coenobita rugosus H. Milne-Edwards, 1837; Coenobita scaevola (Forskål, 1775); Coenobita spinosus H. Milne-Edwards, 1837; Coenobita variabilis McCulloch, 1909; Coenobita violascens Heller, 1862; Coenobita lila Rahayu, Shih & Ng, 2016
	Birgus Leach, 1816	Birgus latro (Linnaeus, 1767) – coconut crab
