= Coenobita lila =

Scientific classification
- Domain: Eukaryota
- Kingdom: Animalia
- Phylum: Arthropoda
- Class: Malacostraca
- Order: Decapoda
- Suborder: Pleocyemata
- Infraorder: Anomura
- Family: Coenobitidae
- Genus: Coenobita
- Species: C. lila

Binomial name
- Coenobita lila Rahayu, Shih & Ng, 2016

Species of crustacean

Coenobita lila is a species of land hermit crab in the genus Coenobita. Coenobita lila is described from Singapore, Malaysia and Indonesia.
