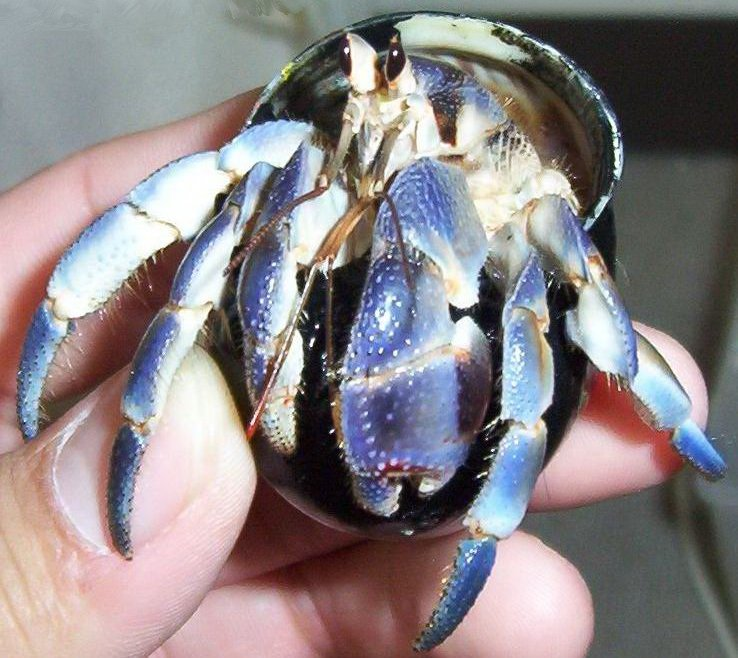
- Coenobita purpureus

Scientific classification
- Kingdom: Animalia
- Phylum: Arthropoda
- Clade: Pancrustacea
- Class: Malacostraca
- Order: Decapoda
- Suborder: Pleocyemata
- Infraorder: Anomura
- Family: Coenobitidae
- Genus: Coenobita
- Species: C. purpureus

Binomial name
- Coenobita purpureus Stimpson, 1858

= Coenobita purpureus =

Species of crustacean

Coenobita purpureus, commonly known as the Blueberry Hermit Crab, is a terrestrial species of hermit crab endemic to many tropical and subtropical islands in the North Pacific Ocean including Kikaijima Island, Ryukyu Island, Okinawa, and the Boso Peninsula in Japan. These crabs are typically 3-4 cm in shield length, which is the width of the opening in the gastropod shell they carry at the widest point, and about 7-10 cm in length. They occur in a variety of blue and purple hues, with white or cream eyestalks and two sets of antennae, and ten legs, synapomorphic to its order, Decapoda. The species is popular among aquarium enthusiasts, but due to the encountered difficulty of breeding them in captivity, they are typically wild caught, which could impact the species’ numbers, leading them to become endangered in the near future.

== Lifecycle ==
Although C. purpureus is a terrestrial hermit crab, access to the ocean is critical for their lifecycle. Their breeding season has been observed to be as long as 3.5-4 months in length from the last weeks in May to mid-to-late September. Individuals migrate to breeding sites around the islands, mating and hiding in rockfaces during the day and coming out after sunset to deposit high volumes of fertilized eggs which hatch into planktonic larvae, called zoea, into the tidepools and on rocks. The waves and tides will then sweep the zoea out to sea, where they will develop into a benthic stage called a megalopae. The megalopae find suitably sized gastropod shells to use for the protection of their soft and vulnerable abdomens before they migrate out of the ocean onto land. They then will molt into the first crab stage about 5-6 days later, continuing to molt until the final adult crab stage is reached. Thereafter, C. purpureus has been observed in captivity to molt about 2-4 times per year.

== Habitat ==
C. purpureus prefers a tropical and/or subtropical environment, observed in the wild to thrive in humid temperatures between 27-29°C. While they prefer these temperate conditions, they have been observed in a laboratory setting to withstand temperatures as low as about 8°C and as high as 38°C. They populate beaches with rocky crevices or areas of shrubbery which provide a suitable hiding place during the day, though they have also been observed hiding in and under trash on less pristine beaches. The crabs also seem to prefer beaches with rocky tidepools and supratidal zones to deposit zoea larvae in.

== Feeding and diet ==
C. purpureus are omnivorous scavengers, consuming washed-up fish, detritus, and various forms of vegetation in its natural habitat. In captivity, they show no real preference as a species and will eat a wide variety of fruits and vegetables, including bananas, pumpkin, broccoli, corn, carrots, peppers, as well as leafy greens. Experts in hermit crab husbandry also recommend a small portion of meat in their diet, which can range from raw or cooked beef, to bloodworms, to cockroaches.

== Behavior ==
Little is known about C. purpureus’ behavior in the wild, such as their mating behaviors. What is known from crabs kept as pets suggests that they are very social and are typically friendly when housed with others in their species but could possibly show aggression to other species. They are diurnal and like to hide in rock crevices, in vegetation, and in substrate by burrowing. They are also quite vocal, and have been studied to emit high frequency chirps, sometimes in sequence, by quickly beating the posterior tip of their body inside their shell. This behavior has been observed in both males and females of the species.

== Husbandry ==
C. purpureus is very popular in the aquarium and pet trade for their vibrant colors and generally friendly nature. Husbandry experts would recommend a minimum enclosure size of 40 liters for one hermit crab, with a mix of sand and coconut fiber as substrate deep enough for the crab to burrow. They also require access to fresh and salt water, both changes regularly. The recommended tank temperature is between 24-28°C with a humidity level between 80-90%. C. purpureus also needs decorations in its artificial habitat for it to hide in and around, as well as multiple extra gastropod shells for it to choose from.

== Impacts of the aquarium and pet trade ==
While C. purpureus does make a striking addition to an aquarium, as they cannot easily be bred in captivity, the vast majority of Blueberry Hermit Crabs in the pet trade are wild-caught. Not enough data is available to definitively determine the conservation status of the species, but surveys have shown that population numbers are very low. In addition, as of 2024, there were no laws in place in Taiwan to prohibit the taking of hermit crabs from their habitats. If the pet trade is able to continue taking hermit crabs at the current rate, it is likely that overexploitation of C. purpureus and others could occur. C. purpureus and other hermit crabs play an important role in their ecosystem as scavengers who will consume decomposing materials as well as prey items.
