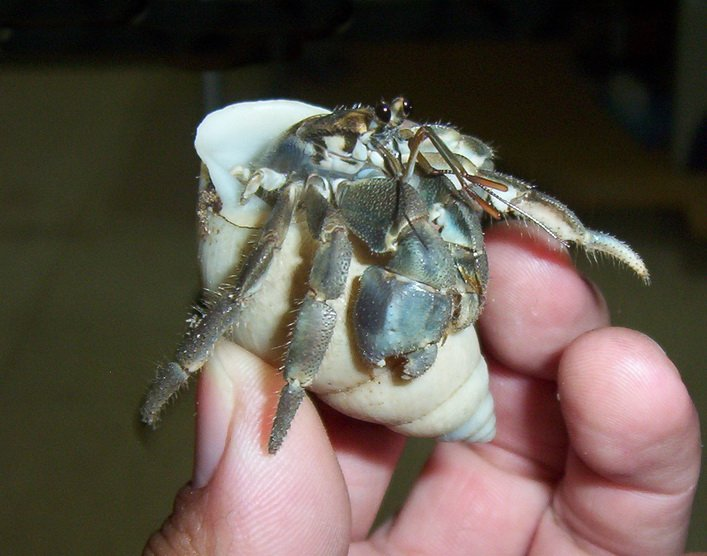

Scientific classification
- Kingdom: Animalia
- Phylum: Arthropoda
- Class: Malacostraca
- Order: Decapoda
- Suborder: Pleocyemata
- Infraorder: Anomura
- Family: Coenobitidae
- Genus: Coenobita
- Species: C. cavipes

Binomial name
- Coenobita cavipes Stimpson, 1858

Synonyms
- Cenobita cavipes Stimpson, 1858; Coenobita baltzeri Neumann, 1878

= Coenobita cavipes =

Species of crustacean

Coenobita cavipes (Passionfruit Hermit) is a species of land hermit crab native to the eastern parts of Africa, the Indonesia, Philippines, China, Japan, Malaysia, Taiwan, Polynesia, and Micronesia. While these hermit crabs are terrestrial, they prefer to reside near the shores for access of both water and land.

C. cavipes usually uses empty turbo shells, and occasionally part of a hard passion fruit.

== Habitat and Ecology ==
This land hermit crab lives in mangrove trees, are mainly nocturnal, and terrestrial species, however often prefer salt water inside of its shell. The larger hermit crabs have been known to submerge their entire bodies into the sea water. The saltwater is used to bind the shell to the crabs back through the high salinity in the water. In addition, water in the shell allows for rehydration, wetting the surface of their gills and abdomen which aids in gas exchange, reducing their body temperature, and facilitating in osmoregulation.

These hermit crabs often reside in holes in large groups and have been known to cannibalize. Possible reasons for this may be due to the fact that they display negative preferences feeding on natural foods, instead preferring foods that they have not recently eaten. Another possible reason for cannibalization is the competition of resources.

A study was conducted that showed these hermit crabs were most active during October. Although their early stages of life are spent near the shore, the study concluded that C. cavipes do not prefer to be close to the shore in later stages of life although they frequently visit the water to replenish the water in their shells. The majority of their days are spent in the sand or under debris to keep from dehydration. Females release their larvae into the sea.

== Characteristics ==
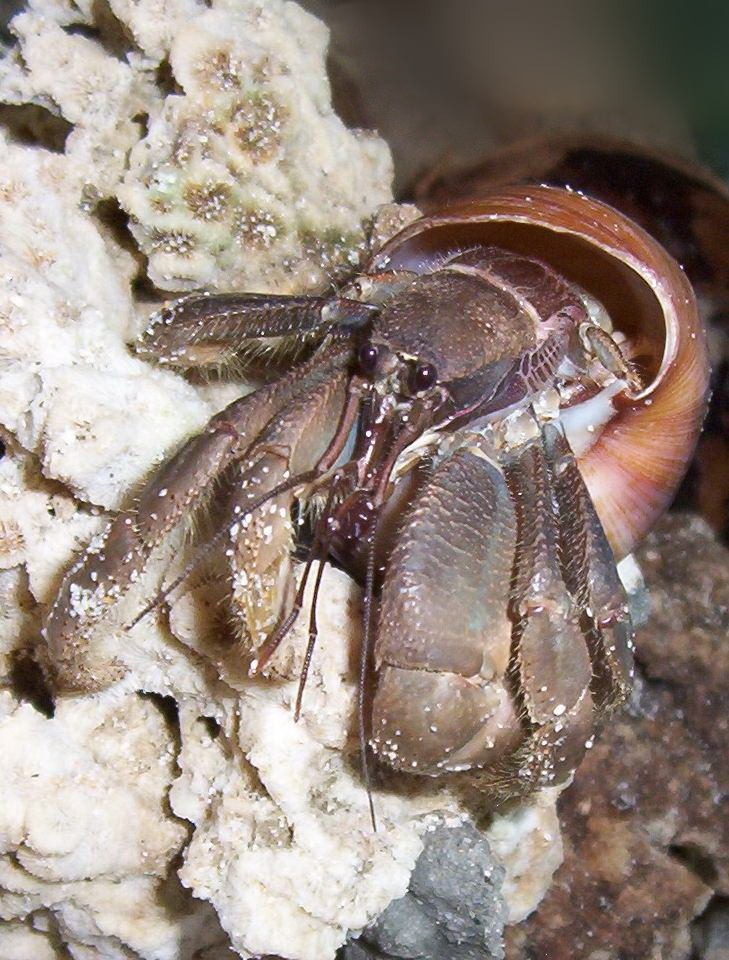
Coenobita cavipes

The Coenobita cavipes prefer shells such as the Thinoclavis sinesis, Thais svigny, Volema paradiscia, Turbo cornoatus, and the Terebralia palustris, preferring larger shells. Their large claw does not contain any "stitch marks", small diagonal lines that line the top of the large claw. Their body is either brown or a blue-grey color. The pinchers often exhibit a lighter color and they have long, comma-shaped eyes. Their orange antenna is often a distinguishing factor for the C. cavipes. Their left claw is often larger, which aids in climbing and moving while their right claw is often smaller which is beneficial in collecting food and materials. A purple chelae is present and no laminar teeth are present on the upper part of the outer surface of their left palm.

== Diet ==
C. cavipes feed in various ways such as deposit feeding, suspension-feeding, predation, and by scavenging. Depending on location, they often feed at low tide on fruits, human feces, bird feces, dead fish, and rotted vegetation. Studies conducted on Quirimba Island discovered that feeding primarily occurs in mangroves and a popular source of food for these hermit crabs are human feces due to the growing population.

== Reproduction ==
Females release their larvae into the sea. Typical breeding season is between mid-May to late August and many females produced two broods or more. A study conducted on Okinawa-jima island found that females of C. cavipes produced smaller eggs, but at a larger amount than other Coenobita species. Possible reasons for this may be lack of availability or poor selection of shells. Another study on Iriomote Island in Japan suggests that semi-lunar rhythms occurred at larval release, but no synchronization between high or low tide was present, unlike other Coenobita species. Eggs on C. cavipes are also incubated for around 30 days or more, unlike other their relatives. Breeding only occurs once to twice per year.
