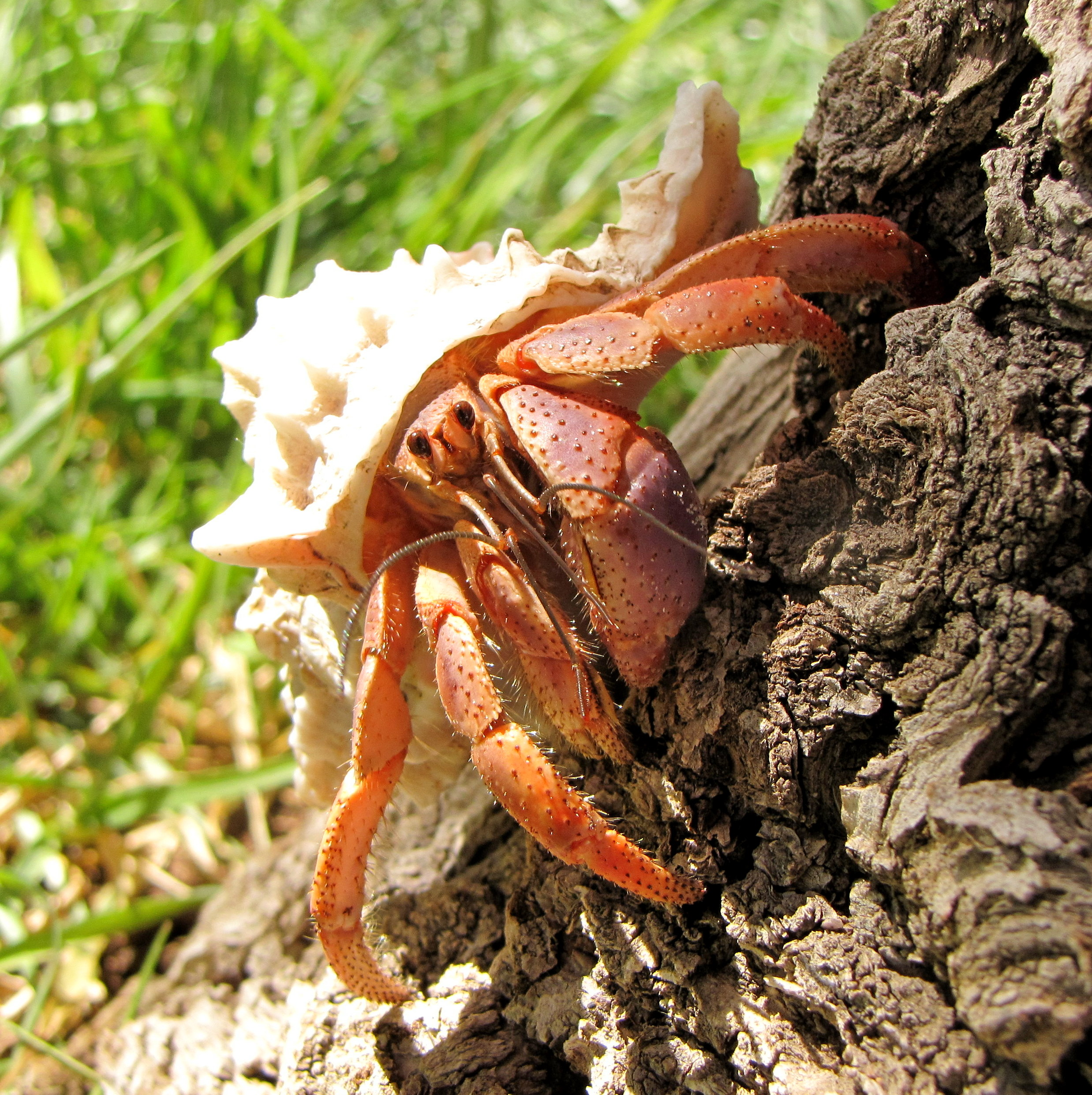

Scientific classification
- Kingdom: Animalia
- Phylum: Arthropoda
- Clade: Pancrustacea
- Class: Malacostraca
- Order: Decapoda
- Suborder: Pleocyemata
- Infraorder: Anomura
- Family: Coenobitidae
- Genus: Coenobita
- Species: C. clypeatus

Binomial name
- Coenobita clypeatus (Fabricius, 1787)

= Caribbean hermit crab =

Species of crustacean

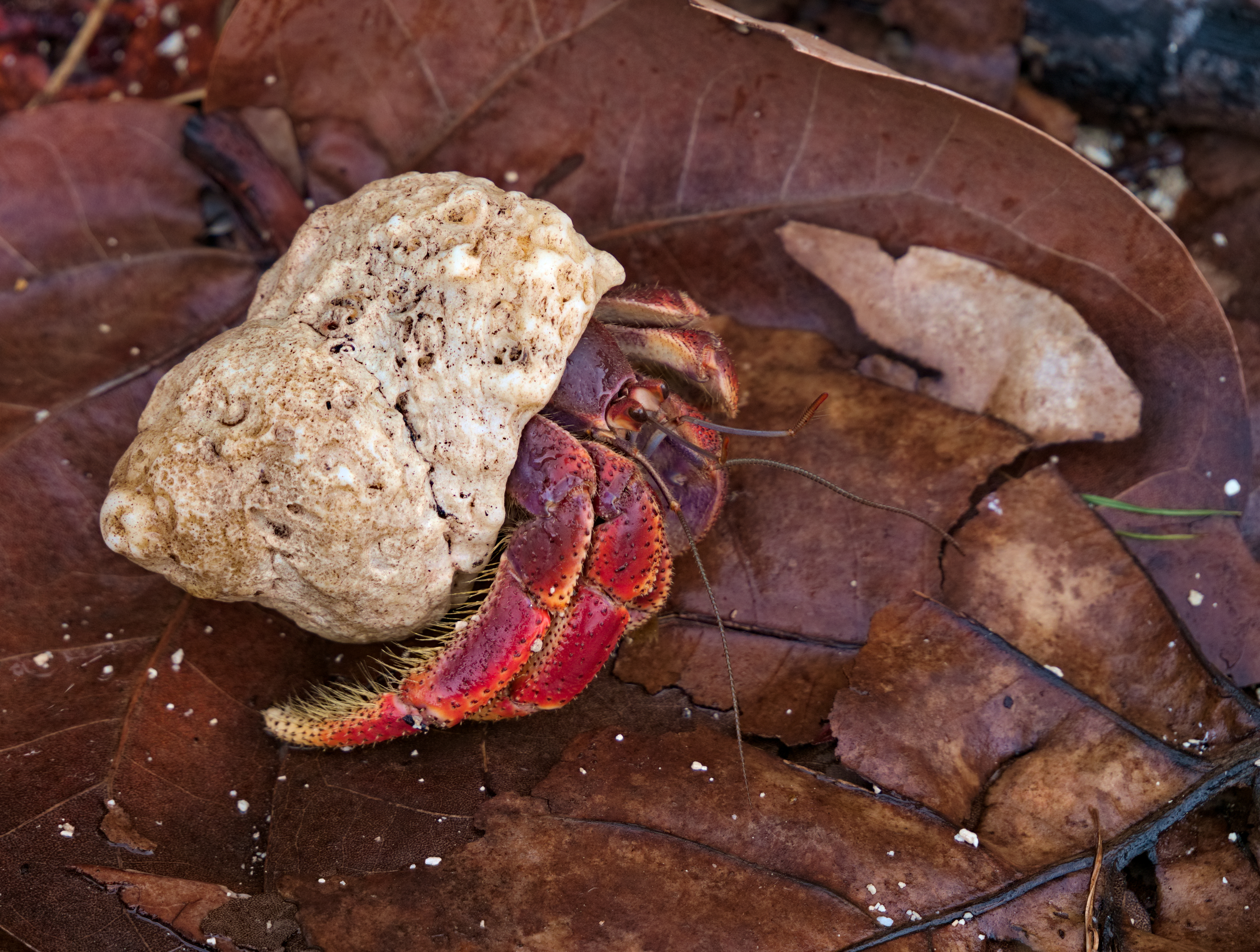
A Caribbean hermit crab in the Dry Tortugas National Park, Florida

The Caribbean hermit crab (Coenobita clypeatus), also known as the soldier crab, West Atlantic crab, tree crab, or purple pincher (due to the distinctive purple claw), is a species of land hermit crab native to the west Atlantic, Belize, southern Florida, Venezuela, and the West Indies.

== Description ==
Adults burrow and hide under the roots of large trees, and can be found a considerable distance inland. As with other terrestrial decapods, they use modified gills to breathe air. Their shells help maintain the humidity necessary for gas exchange to function. Typically, the Caribbean hermit crab's left claw is larger in size than its right claw and is purple in color. Female land hermit crabs release fertilized eggs into the ocean. The spawning (called "washing" in the English-speaking Caribbean) occurs on certain nights, usually around August.

== Ecology ==
Caribbean hermit crabs are both herbivorous and scavengers. In the wild, C. clypeatus feeds on animal and plant remains, overripe fruit, and faeces of other animals, including the Mona ground iguana (Cyclura stejnegeri). The West Indian top snail (Cittarium pica) shell is often used for its home, and the hermit crab can use its larger claw to cover the aperture of the shell for protection against predators. As with other species of hermit crabs, C. clypeatus may engage in "shell fights" and can emit a chirping noise when stressed.

== Pet Trade ==
This species is one of the two land hermit crabs commonly sold in the United States as pets, the other being the Ecuadorian hermit crab, C. compressus. C. clypeatus has been confirmed to live as long as 12 years, and some crab owners have claimed to have crabs live up to 40 years.
