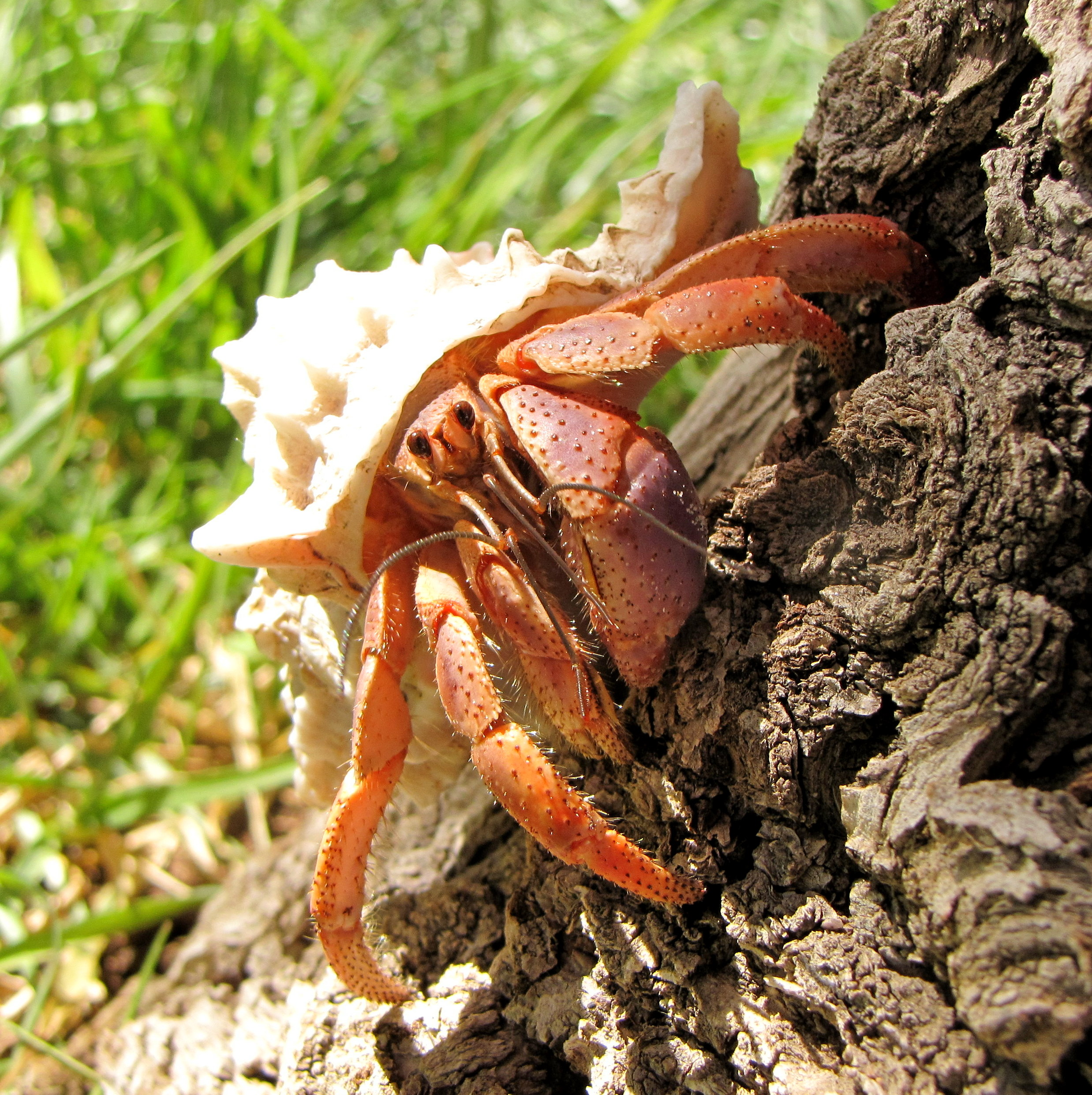
- Caribbean hermit crab, C. clypeatus

Scientific classification
- Kingdom: Animalia
- Phylum: Arthropoda
- Class: Malacostraca
- Order: Decapoda
- Suborder: Pleocyemata
- Infraorder: Anomura
- Family: Coenobitidae
- Genus: Coenobita; Latreille, 1829

Type species
- Pagurus clypeatus Fabricius, 1787

= Coenobita =

Genus of crustaceans

The junior homonym Coenobita Gistl, 1848 is now the moth genus Ectropis.

The genus Coenobita contains 21 species of terrestrial hermit crabs. Several species in this genus are kept as pets.

== Ecology ==
Coenobita species carry water in the gastropod shells they inhabit, allowing them to stay out of water for a long time.

== Distribution ==
The majority of the species are found in the Indo-Pacific region, with only one species in West Africa, one species occurring along the Atlantic coast of the Americas, and one species occurring on the Pacific coast of the Americas.

Image	Species	Authority	Year	Distribution
	Coenobita brevimanus	Dana	1852	Indo-Pacific
	Coenobita carnescens	Dana	1851	Pacific Ocean
	Coenobita cavipes	Stimpson	1858	Indo-Pacific
	Coenobita clypeatus	(Fabricius)	1787	Western Atlantic
	Coenobita compressus	H. Milne-Edwards	1836	Eastern Pacific
	Coenobita lila	Rahayu	2016	Singapore, Malaysia, Indonesia
	Coenobita longitarsis	De Man	1902	East Indies
	Coenobita olivieri	Owen	1839	Pacific Ocean
	Coenobita perlatus	H. Milne-Edwards	1837	Indo-Pacific
	Coenobita pseudorugosus	Nakasone	1988	Indo-Pacific
	Coenobita purpureus	Stimpson	1858	Japan
	Coenobita rubescens	Greeff	1884	West Africa
	Coenobita rugosus	H. Milne-Edwards	1837	Indo-Pacific
	Coenobita scaevola	(Forskål)	1775	Indian Ocean, Red Sea
	Coenobita spinosus	H. Milne-Edwards	1837	Polynesia & Australia
	Coenobita variabilis	McCulloch	1909	Australia
	Coenobita violascens	Heller	1862	Pacific Ocean

== Taxonomy ==
Coenobita is closely related to the coconut crab, Birgus latro, with the two genera making up the family Coenobitidae. The name Coenobita was coined by Pierre André Latreille in 1829, from an Ecclesiastical Latin word, ultimately from the Greek κοινόβιον, meaning "commune"; the genus is masculine in gender.
