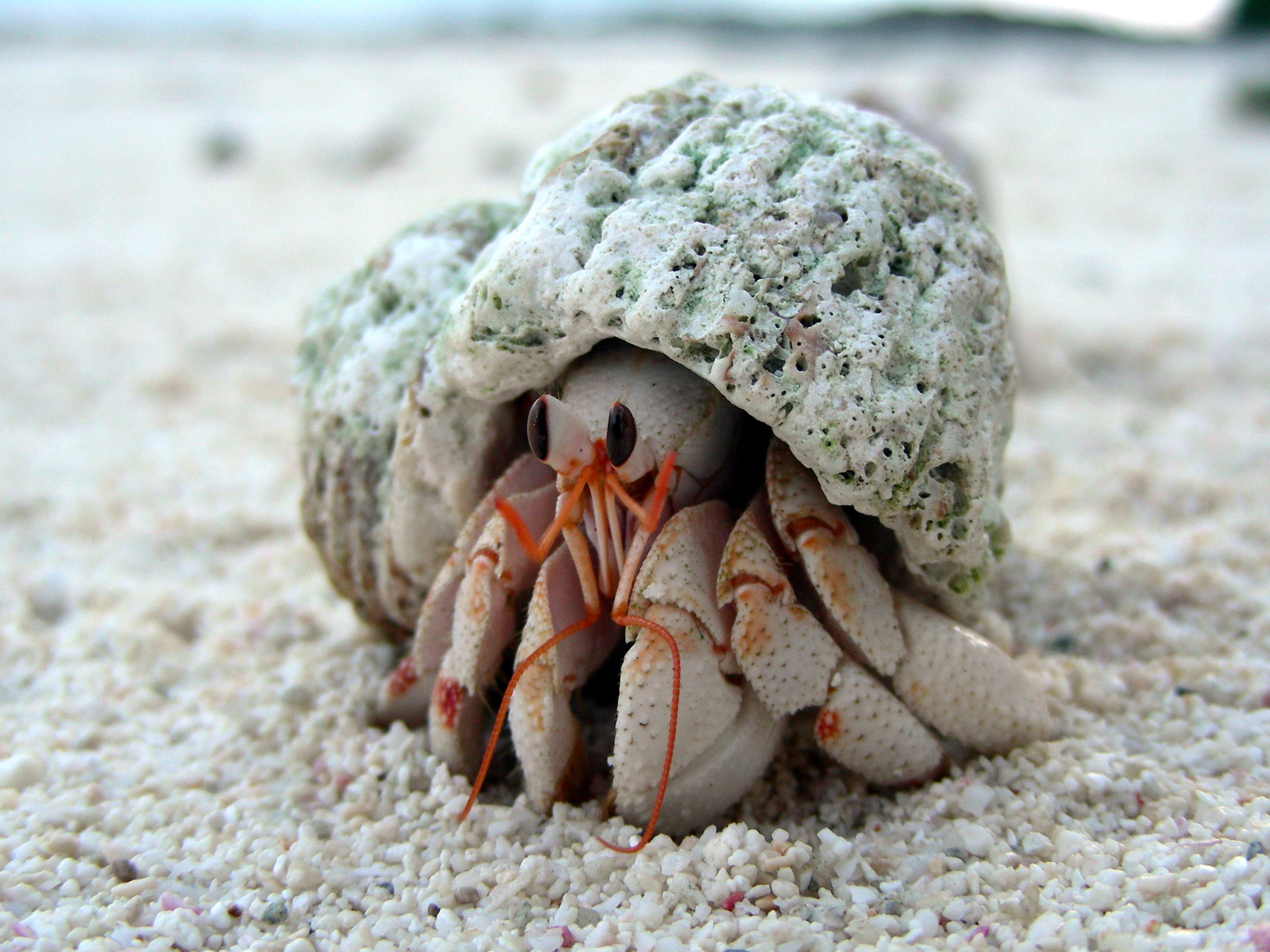

Scientific classification
- Kingdom: Animalia
- Phylum: Arthropoda
- Class: Malacostraca
- Order: Decapoda
- Suborder: Pleocyemata
- Infraorder: Anomura
- Family: Coenobitidae
- Genus: Coenobita
- Species: C. perlatus

Binomial name
- Coenobita perlatus H. Milne-Edwards, 1837

= Coenobita perlatus =

Species of crustacean

Coenobita perlatus is a species of terrestrial hermit crab. It is known as the strawberry hermit crab because of its reddish-orange colours. It is a widespread scavenger across the Indo-Pacific, and wild-caught specimens are traded to hobby aquarists.

== Description ==
Adults may grow to a typical length of 80 mm (3.1 in) and weight of 80 g (2.8 oz), and inhabit discarded gastropod shells. They are coloured red or orange; this has led to the species' common name of strawberry hermit crab. C. perlatus and the other members of Coenobita should not be considered easy pets, as the conditions they need in the wild are difficult and expensive to set up in captivity. Even ideal captive conditions still considerably shorten their life, and they never reproduce.

== Distribution ==
Coenobita perlatus lives in a wide swathe of the Indo-Pacific, from Indonesia, Mauritius, Seychelles, and Aldabra in the west to Samoa in the east. In Australia, the species is limited to Christmas Island, the Cocos Islands, the Great Barrier Reef, and the Coral Sea Islands Territory. In the wild, animals may live for 25–30 years, but in captivity they only live for 1–4 years and do not reproduce.

== Ecology and behaviour ==
Coenobita perlatus keeps a supply of water in the shell it inhabits. It returns to the sea at night to refresh its water, and it performs osmoregulation by taking appropriate quantities of sea water and fresh water. In the heat of the day, it can bury itself in damp sand as a means of thermoregulation and to prevent water loss. It can also withdraw into its shell and close the aperture with its claws.

Coenobita perlatus is an efficient scavenger, to the extent that the low numbers of carrion-breeding flies on many islands have been attributed to the presence of C. perlatus. It has also been observed to use its claws to pinch the live flesh from the invasive land snail Achatina fulica.

Eggs are brooded inside the shell that the female inhabits, but are released into the sea.

== Taxonomic history ==
Coenobita perlatus was originally described in 1837 by Henri Milne-Edwards, based on material from Mauritius.

== Pets ==
Coenobita perlatus is the rarest of the six species that are frequently found in the hobby aquarium trade.
