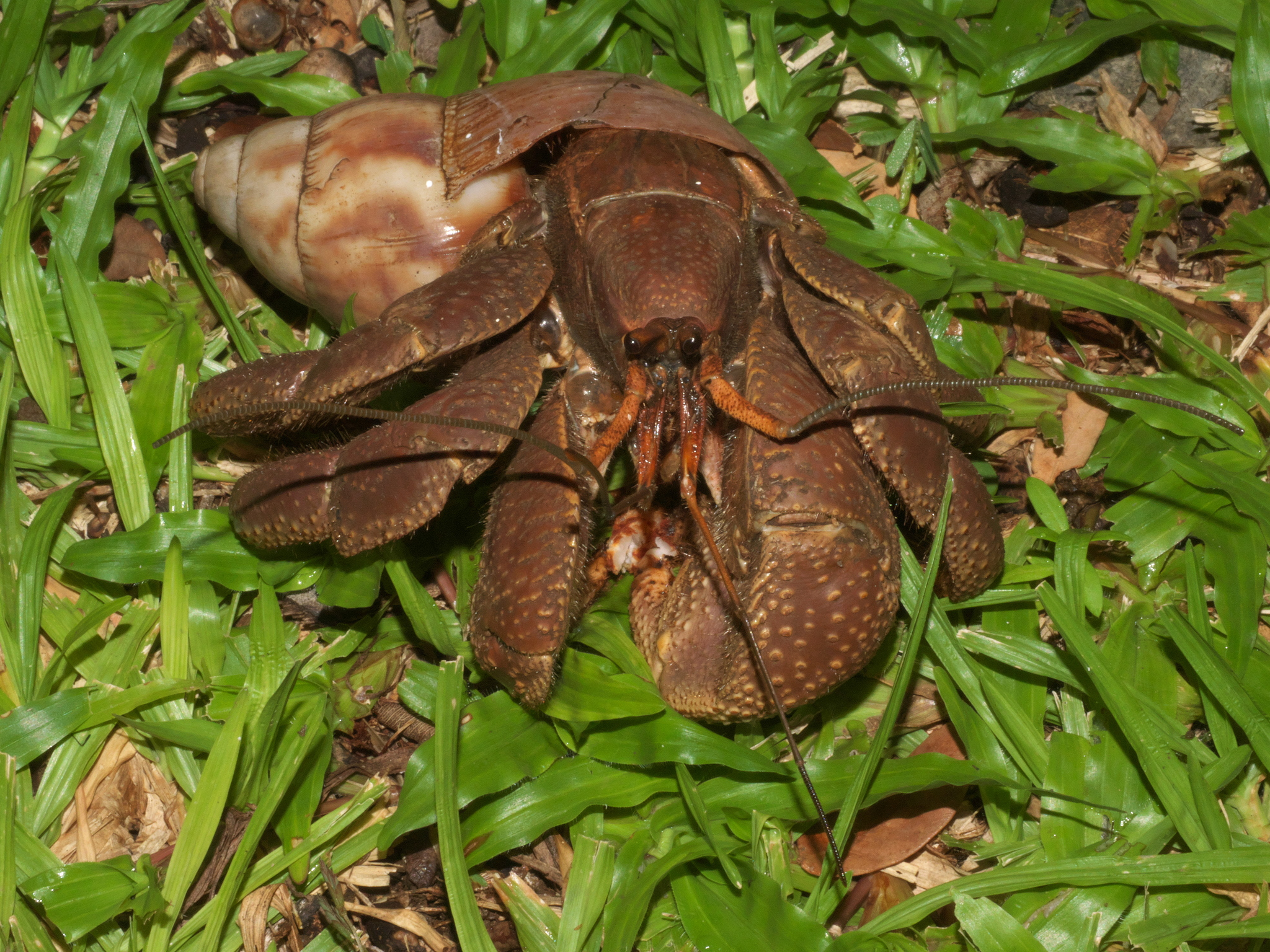

Scientific classification
- Kingdom: Animalia
- Phylum: Arthropoda
- Clade: Pancrustacea
- Class: Malacostraca
- Order: Decapoda
- Suborder: Pleocyemata
- Infraorder: Anomura
- Family: Coenobitidae
- Genus: Coenobita
- Species: C. brevimanus

Binomial name
- Coenobita brevimanus Dana, 1852

= Coenobita brevimanus =

Species of crustacean

Coenobita brevimanus is a species of terrestrial hermit crab belonging to the family Coenobitidae, which is composed of coastal-living terrestrial hermit crabs. The Latin origins of the species name, brevimanus, come from the adjective brevis ("small") and the noun manus ("hands"). It is known as the Indos crab or Indonesian crab because it is primarily distributed throughout the Indo-Pacific.

== Description ==
Coenobita brevimanus is one of the larger species in the genus Coenobita. The adults can grow up to .5 pounds (230 g). They can live 12–70 years and are known to grow to the size of a coconut. During the beginning of the crab's juvenile stage the middle of its carapace possesses a long reddish pigment area as does each side wall of the carapace. As the crab reaches one month old these areas develop into a brown stripe down the middle of the carapace and two brown bands on either side wall of the carapace. The rest of the carapace as well as the pereiopods slowly transition from a white color to a grayish color. Eventually, when they reach full adulthood, they are brownish red with violet shading on their limbs. The brown stripe and bands are still present in the adult crabs. They are darker than most other species of its genus. They have an abdominal lung and extremely reduced gills due to their terrestrial lifestyle. They also have a disproportionately large dark purple pincher and long black eye stalks which they can easily be identified by. There is also a pink variation of C. brevimanus in which their dominant pincher is pink instead of a dark purple. Compared to other species in their genus, they do not prefer large gastropod shells, and the armored variation of this crab, in which a tougher exoskeleton is present, specifically likes small shells that only cover their body past their third pair of walking legs. Although their availability and demand has risen in recent years, they are not commonly kept as pets due to their size, but they are the largest land hermit crab known to be in captivity.

== Distribution and habitat ==
Coenobita brevimanus is native to the east coast of Africa and south-west Pacific Ocean. It has also been reported in East Africa, the Philippines, Japan, China, and Taiwan. They usually reside inland and away from the coastline in moist environments, such as rainforests, because they do not like to get wet, but still require a high amount of humidity. Generally, they require at least eighty percent humidity and enjoy temperatures between eighty and eighty-five degrees, which influences their distribution greatly towards tropical zones. The present record of this species suggests a continuous distribution from the east coast of Africa to the south-west Pacific Ocean.

== Behavior and ecology ==
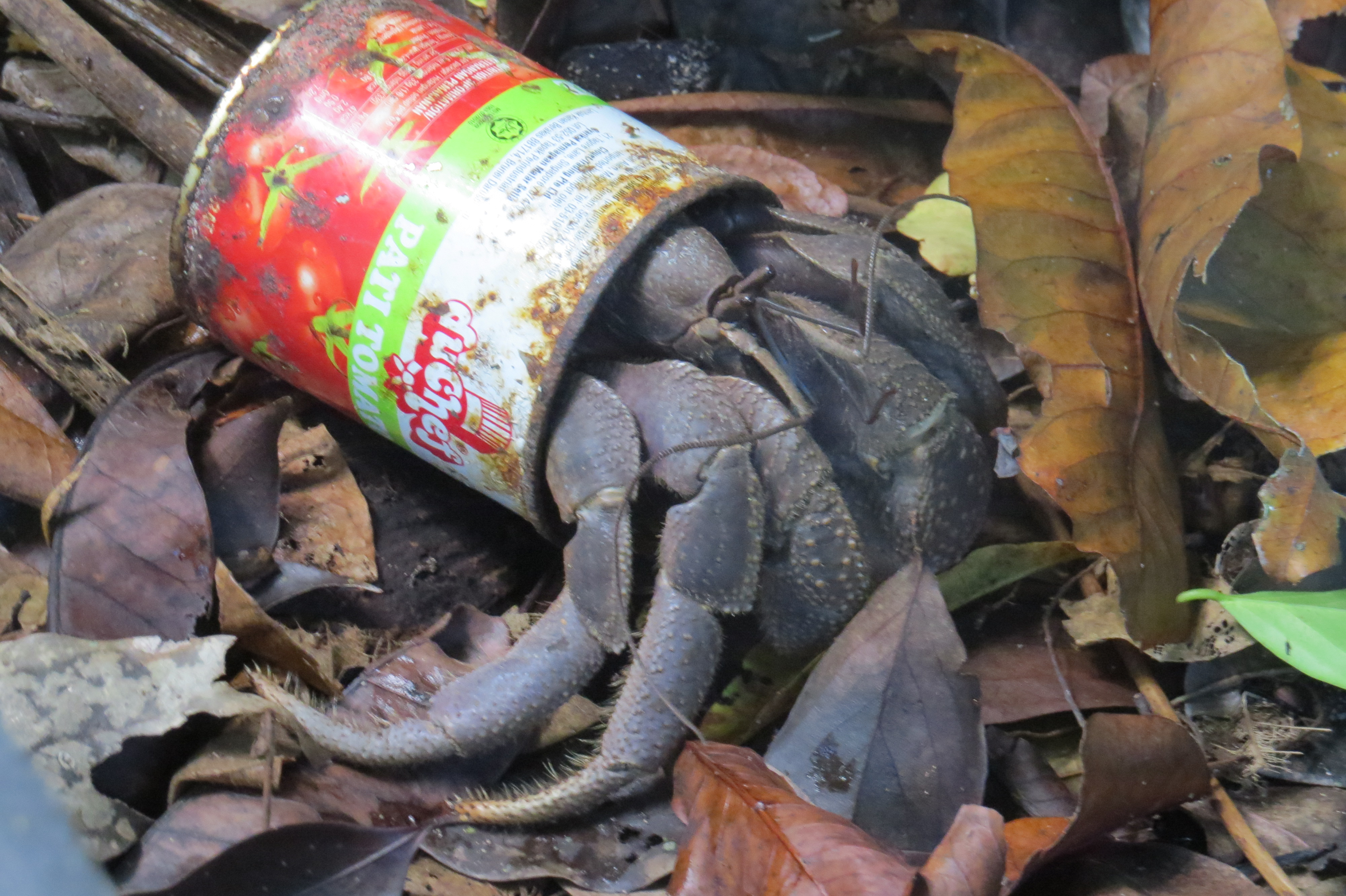
This purple hermit crab is using a soup can as a shell because there were no large snail shells left in the area, probably due to collection for the souvenir market.

Coenobita brevimanus larvae are brooded inside the female's shell, then laid in seawater. This is the only time the adult C. brevimanus returns to the water after they reach adulthood. They grow from the larval planktonic stage to the megalopal stage before migrating from the sea to the land. They also develop a habit of acquiring discarded gastropod shells for inhabitation before migration. If gastropod shells are not present, often due to the collection for the souvenir market, they can be seen using soup cans and other litter as shells. After they acquire their shell, they migrate onto land. After this migration they are fully terrestrial, being the most terrestrial species in the genus Coenobita, often found over one hundred meters from the coast. As they grow on land, they tend to molt around every eighteen months, in which they burrow underground, molt, and then come up when their exoskeleton is no longer soft. This process can take upwards to a month. They are highly active during the month of July, with an increase in activity in the months leading up to July, and a decrease in activity after the month of July. Although they are terrestrial, they can tolerate only a 28% loss of body water. Beyond this point, a severe disruption in oxygen transport occurs. They also have difficulty recovering from periods of dehydration. In order to prevent dehydration they fill their shells with brackish or fresh water. They have the ability to detect volatile chemicals in the air in relation to food and water sources and orient themselves accordingly, which is useful in finding food and unevenly distributed inland water supplies. They are omnivores and scavenger feeders who operate primarily at night. They tend to prefer fish over fruits when given the option between the two. They have also been known to prey on smaller species of hermit crabs, such as C. rugosus, making them not only scavengers, but also predators.

== Taxonomy ==
Coenobita brevimanus was first taxonomically classified in 1852 by Dana.
