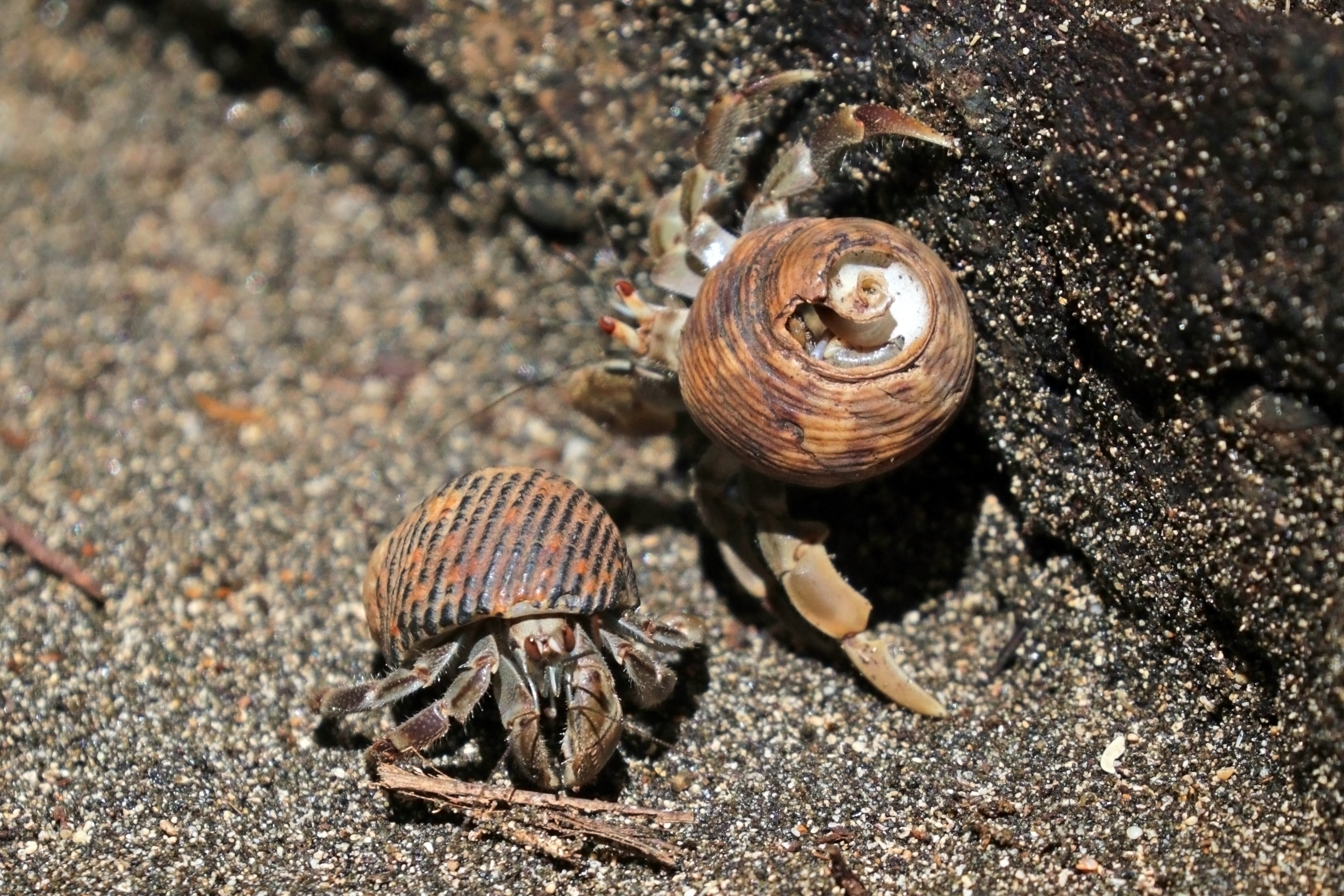
- Boca Chica, Chiriquí, Panama

Scientific classification
- Kingdom: Animalia
- Phylum: Arthropoda
- Clade: Pancrustacea
- Class: Malacostraca
- Order: Decapoda
- Suborder: Pleocyemata
- Infraorder: Anomura
- Family: Coenobitidae
- Genus: Coenobita
- Species: C. compressus

Binomial name
- Coenobita compressus H. Milne-Edwards, 1836

= Ecuadorian hermit crab =

Species of crustacean

The Ecuadorian hermit crab (Coenobita compressus) also known as the Pacific hermit crab is a species of land hermit crab. It is one of the two land hermit crabs commonly sold in North America as pets, the other being the Caribbean hermit crab (C. clypeatus).

== Features and identification ==
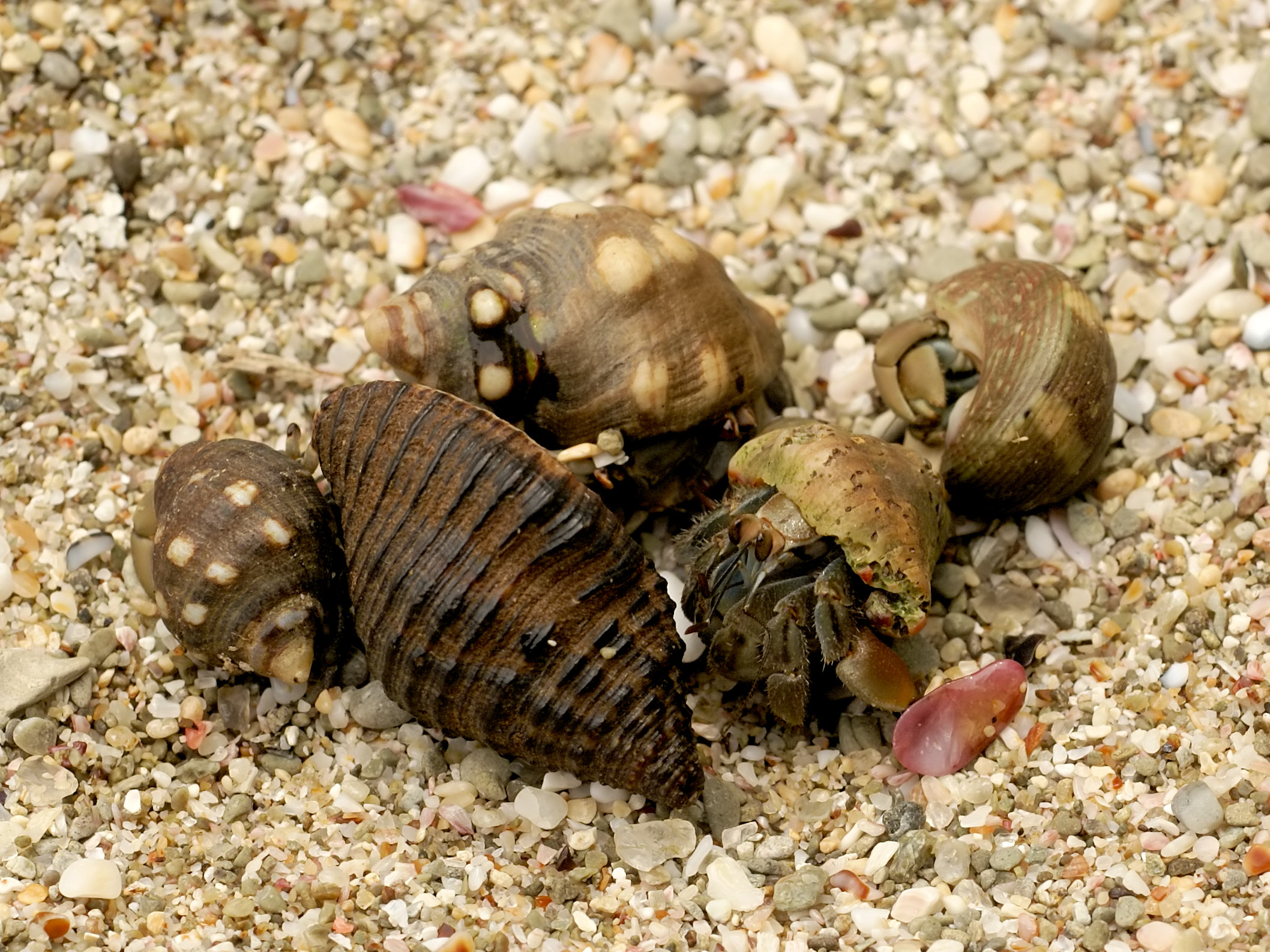
Hermit crab at Cabo Blanca, Nicoya Peninsula, Costa Rica

Coenobita compressus is a member of the phylum Arthropoda and the class Malacostraca. They can be up to 12 mm (0.47 in) in length and are thought to be one of the smallest species of land hermit crabs. They have four walking legs, a small pincer, a large pincer, and antennae. Their eyes are more oval-shaped when compared to the round eyes of Caribbean hermit crabs and are thicker. Their big claw has four or five small ridges on the upper part. The tips of the second pair of walking legs are darker than the rest of the leg. The abdomen of the Ecuadorian hermit crab is short and fat.

Ecuadorian hermit crabs vary greatly in colour, some are bright (yellow, dark grey, or orange), but more often they are a tan colour. Sometimes, they may have a blue or green tint to their bodies or the insides of their legs. They also have comma-shaped eyes, unlike the "purple pincher" (C. clypeatus), which has dot-shaped eyes.

When choosing a shell, they tend to give preference to shells with a wide and round aperture.

== Habitats ==
Native to the Americas, these hermit crabs live on the Pacific seashore ranging from Mexico to Chile, and tend to gather around tidal pools and high-tide zone. Their bodies have adapted to this seashore existence, and in captivity, they require access to seawater, as they must metabolize the salt in it and bathe in it to maintain gill moisture. Failure to provide access to seawater (real or artificial) will result in death.

Like most hermit crabs, they are scavengers and consume seaweed, dead fish, and other detritus that washes up on the shore.

== Studies ==
Coenobita compressus prefers the odors of foods that they have not recently eaten. Hermit crabs exposed to one food for at least 9 hours preferred foods having other odors for the next 6 hours. This short-term avoidance of food (like human beings who get bored with the same meals over and over again) compels the crabs to seek out a wider range of food. This might be advantageous to the crabs, possibly through the consumption of a more nutritionally balanced diet. Ecuadorian hermit crabs can make a chirping sound to communicate with each other.

== As pets ==
Hermit crabs overall were once seen as a "throwaway pet" that would live only a few months, but species such as C. clypeatus have a 23-year lifespan if properly treated and some have lived longer than 32 years. Many are neglected though even as Hermit crabs are characterised as curious, intelligent and social. Similarly, Ecuadorian hermit crabs have been known to live to over 30 years. In general, and despite their moniker, hermit crabs are social animals that do best in groups.
