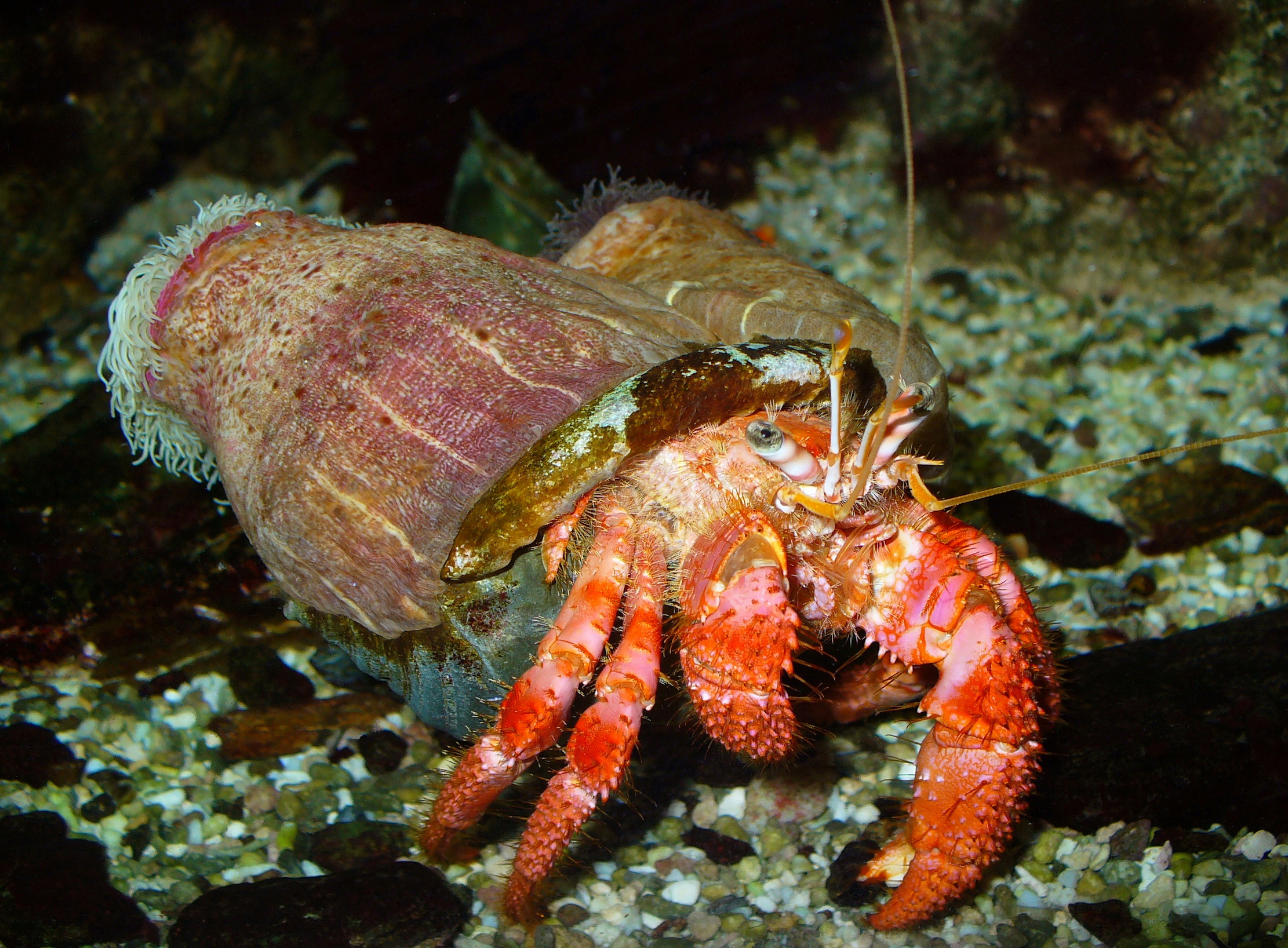
- Dardanus calidus

Scientific classification
- Kingdom: Animalia
- Phylum: Arthropoda
- Clade: Pancrustacea
- Class: Malacostraca
- Order: Decapoda
- Suborder: Pleocyemata
- Infraorder: Anomura
- Superfamily: Paguroidea; Latreille, 1802

Families
- Coenobitidae; Diogenidae; Lithodidae; Paguridae; Parapaguridae; Probeebeidae; Pylochelidae; Pylojacquesidae; Xylopaguridae

= Hermit crab =

Hermit crab Temporal range: Hettangian–Present

Superfamily of crustaceans (Paguroidea)

Hermit crabs are anomuran decapod crustaceans of the superfamily Paguroidea that have adapted to occupy empty scavenged gastropod shells to protect their fragile abdomens. There are over 800 species of hermit crab, most of which possess an asymmetric abdomen concealed by a snug-fitting shell. Hermit crabs' soft (non-calcified) abdominal exoskeleton means they must occupy shelter produced by other organisms or risk being defenseless.

The strong association between hermit crabs and their shelters has significantly influenced their biology. Almost 800 species carry mobile shelters (most often calcified snail shells); this protective mobility contributes to the diversity and multitude of these crustaceans, which are found in almost all marine environments. In most species, development involves metamorphosis from symmetric, free-swimming larvae to morphologically asymmetric, benthic-dwelling, shell-seeking crabs. Such physiological and behavioral extremes facilitate a transition to a sheltered lifestyle, revealing the extensive evolutionary lengths that led to the superfamily's success.

== Classification ==
The hermit crabs of Paguroidea are more closely related to squat lobsters and porcelain crabs than they are to true crabs (Brachyura). Together with the squat lobsters and porcelain crabs, they all belong to the infraorder Anomura, the sister taxon to Brachyura.

However, the relationship of king crabs to the rest of Paguroidea has been a highly contentious topic. Many studies based on their physical characteristics, genetic information, and combined data demonstrate the longstanding hypothesis that the king crabs in the family Lithodidae are derived hermit crabs descended from pagurids and should be classified as a family within Paguroidea. The molecular data has disproven an alternate view based on morphological arguments that the Lithodidae (king crabs) nest with the Hapalogastridae in a separate superfamily, Lithodoidea. As such, in 2023, the family Lithodidae was placed back into Paguroidea after having been moved out of it in 2007.

Nine families are formally recognized in the superfamily Paguroidea, containing around 1200 species in total in 148 genera.

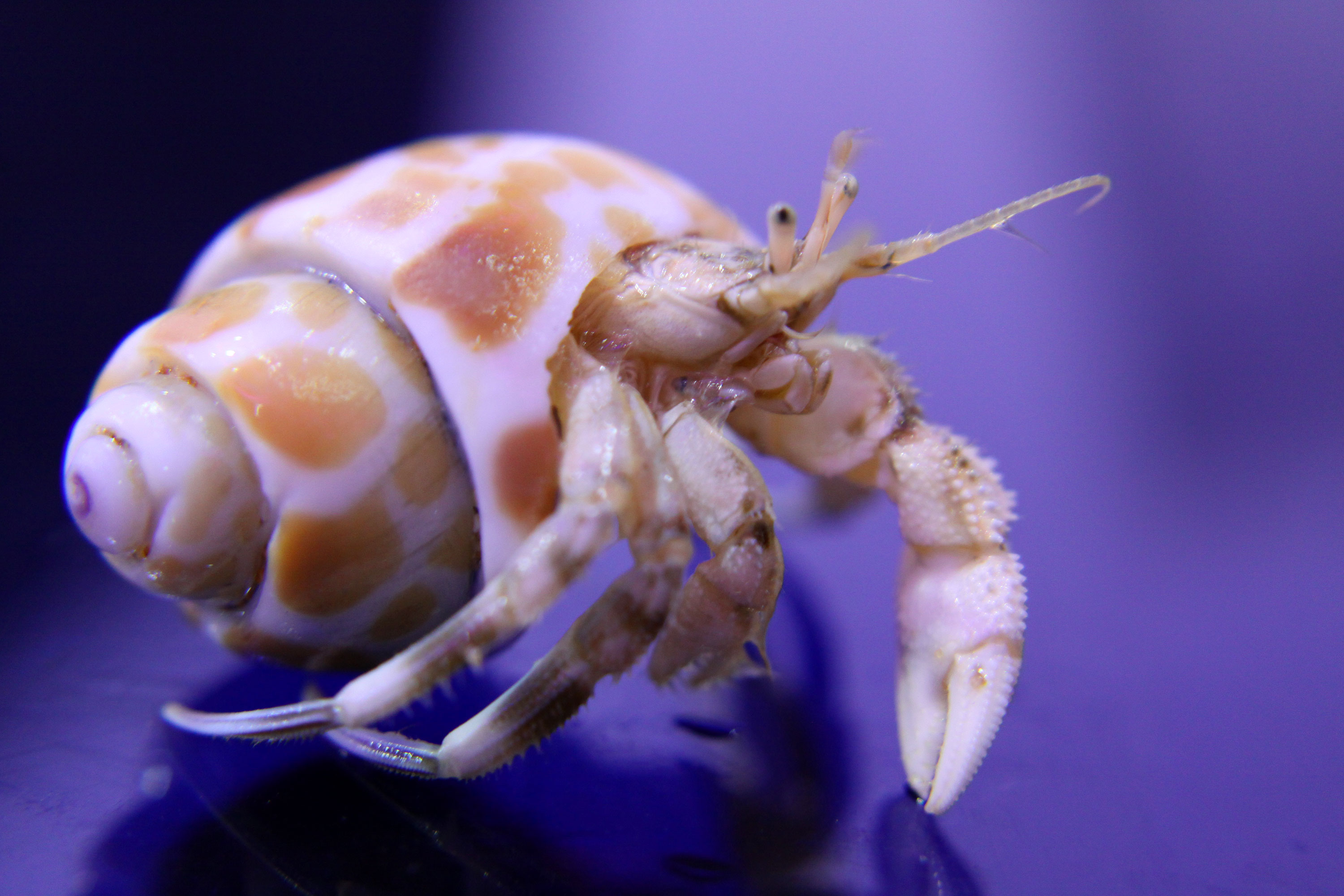
A hermit crab from Chabahar, Iran

- Coenobitidae Dana, 1851 – 2 genera: terrestrial hermit crabs and the coconut crab
- Diogenidae Ortmann, 1892 – 26 genera of "left-handed hermit crabs"
- Lithodidae Samouelle, 1819 – 15 genera of "king crabs"
- Paguridae Latreille, 1802 – 76 genera of "true hermit crabs"
- Parapaguridae Smith, 1882 – 8 genera of "anemone hermit crabs"
- Probeebeidae Boone, 1926 - 3 genera
- Pylochelidae Bate, 1888 – 12 genera of "symmetrical hermit crabs"
- Pylojacquesidae McLaughlin & Lemaitre, 2001 – 2 genera
- Xylopaguridae Gašparič, Fraaije, Robin & de Angeli, 2016 - 4 genera

=== Phylogeny ===
The placement of Paguroidea within Anomura can be shown in the cladogram below, which also shows the Lithodidae as sister taxon to the hermit crabs of Paguridae:

- Brachyura ("true" crabs)
- Anomura
  - - Porcellanidae (porcelain crabs)
    - Munididae (squat lobsters)
  - - - Parapaguridae (deep water sea anemone hermit crabs)
      - Eumunididae (squat lobsters)
    - - Hippidae (mole crabs or sand crabs)
      - Paguroidea
        - - Lithodidae (king crabs)
          - Paguridae (hermit crabs)
        - - Diogenidae (left-handed hermit crabs)
          - Coenobitidae (terrestrial hermit crabs)

=== Fossil record ===
The fossil record of in situ hermit crabs using gastropod shells stretches back to the Late Cretaceous. Before that time, at least some hermit crabs used ammonite shells instead, as shown by a specimen of Palaeopagurus vandenengeli from the Speeton Clay Formation, Yorkshire, UK, from the Lower Cretaceous, as well as a specimen of a diogenid hermit crab from the Upper Jurassic of Russia. The earliest record of the superfamily extends back to the earliest part of the Jurassic, with the oldest known species being Schobertella hoelderi from the late Hettangian of Germany.

=== Aquatic and terrestrial hermit crabs ===
Hermit crabs can be informally divided into two groups: aquatic hermit crabs and terrestrial hermit crabs.

The land hermit crabs belong to the family Coenobitidae. They spend most of their life on land in tropical areas, though they require access to water to keep their gills damp or wet to survive and to reproduce.

== Description ==
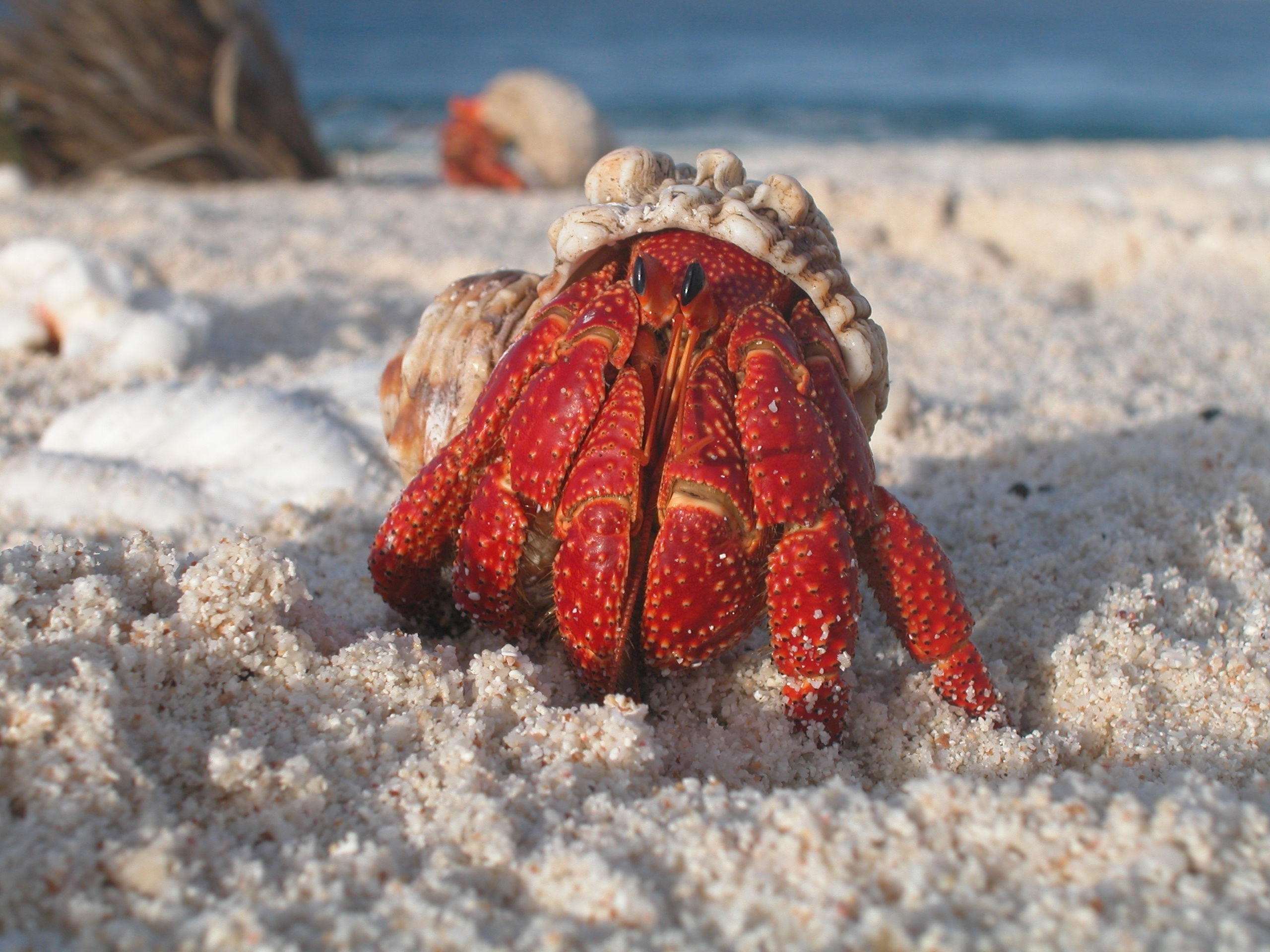
A hermit crab emerges from its shell, Coenobita perlatus

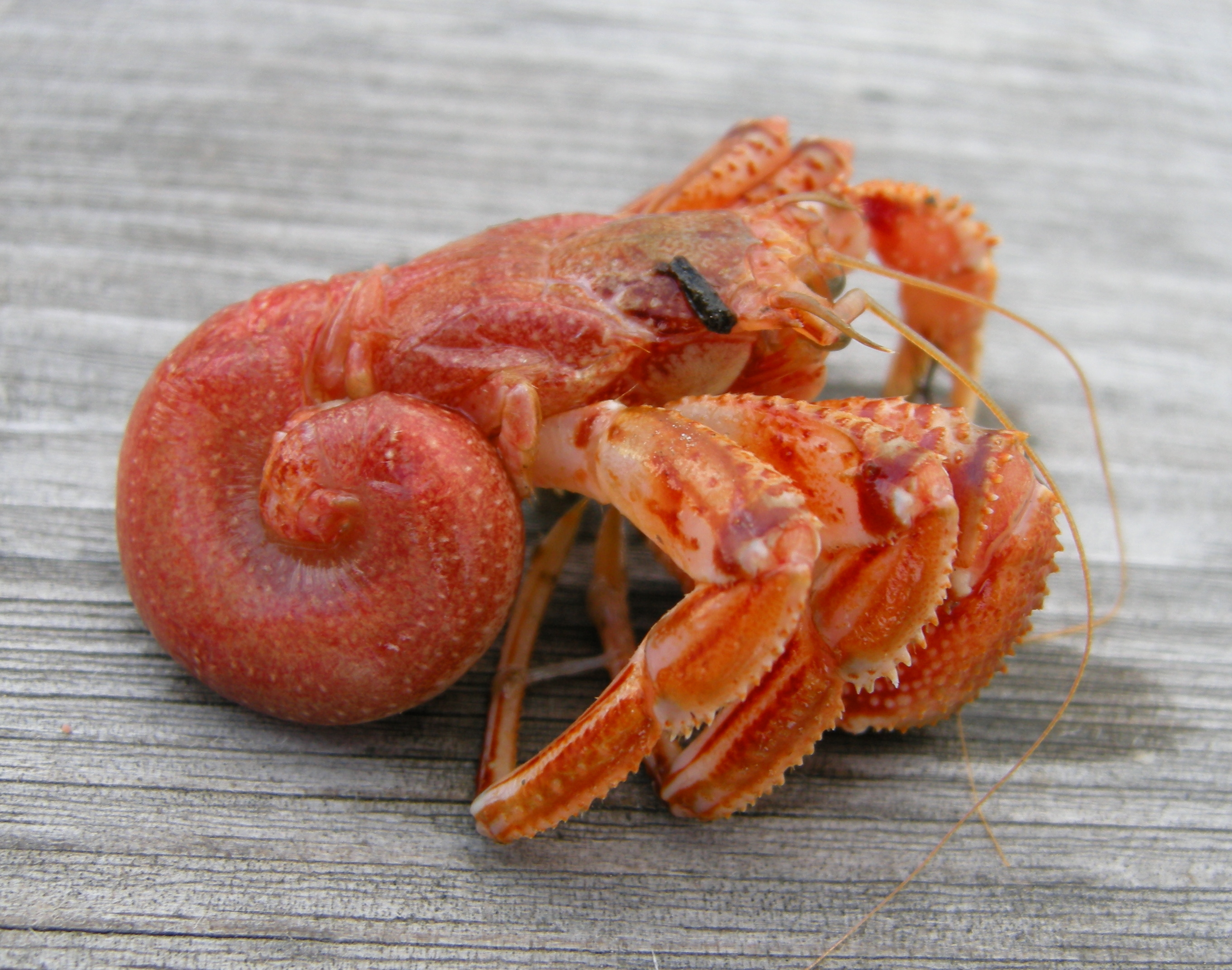
Outside its shell, the soft, curved abdomen of hermit crabs, such as Pagurus bernhardus, is vulnerable.

Hermit crab species range in size and shape, from species only a few millimeters long to Coenobita brevimanus (Indos Crab), which can approach the size of a coconut and live 12–70 years. The shell-less hermit crab Birgus latro (coconut crab) is the world's largest terrestrial invertebrate.

Most species have long, spirally curved abdomens, which are soft, unlike the hard, calcified abdomens seen in related crustaceans. The abdomen is protected from predators by a salvaged empty seashell carried by the hermit crab, into which its whole body can retract. Most frequently, hermit crabs use the shells of sea snails (although the shells of bivalves and scaphopods and even hollow pieces of wood and stone are used by some species). The tip of the hermit crab's abdomen is adapted to clasp strongly onto the columella of the snail shell.

== Development and reproduction ==
Several hermit crabs on the beach at Amami Ōshima in Japan.

Hermit crab young develop in stages, with the first two (the nauplius and protozoea) occurring inside the egg. Most hermit crab larvae hatch at the third stage, the zoea. In this larval stage, the crab has several long spines, a long, narrow abdomen, and large fringed antennae. Several zoeal moults are followed by the final larval stage, the megalopa.

The sexual behavior exhibited by hermit crabs varies from species to species. But a broad description is as follows, if the female possesses any larvae from a previous mating, she moults and lets them go. Female hermit crabs are ready to mate shortly before moulting. In certain species the male grabs the pre-moult female for sometimes hours to days. During the time in which the female molts the male may engage in movements such as jerking or shaking the female towards the male before reproduction.

The female will then put her claws in her mouth signaling the male she is ready to mate. Then they both move their bodies mostly out of their shells, and mate. Both crabs then go back inside their shells, and they may mate again. In some species the male performs post-copulatory behavior until the female has the eggs on her legs (pleopods).

Hermit crabs molt as they develop and grow. In doing so they shed an exoskeleton that resembles a limp crab. The molting process is long and can take up to 60 days to complete. There are 4 stages to molting: intermolt, proecdysis, ecdysis, and postedysis. Intermolt is the time between molts where a hermit crab will store energy. Proecdysis is the premolt stage where the old exoskeleton starts to shed and the new one forms. Ecdysis is the main phase of the molt where the crab will be able to crawl out of the old exoskeleton and is left with a new, soft one. Lastly postedysis (post molt) is where the new exoskeleton hardens and the hermit crab will eat the old exoskeleton.

In some larger species of hermit crab they have exhibited burying the exoskeleton and leaving it.

== Behavior ==
Hermit crabs are omnivorous scavengers, and mostly nocturnal.

=== Shells and shell remodeling ===
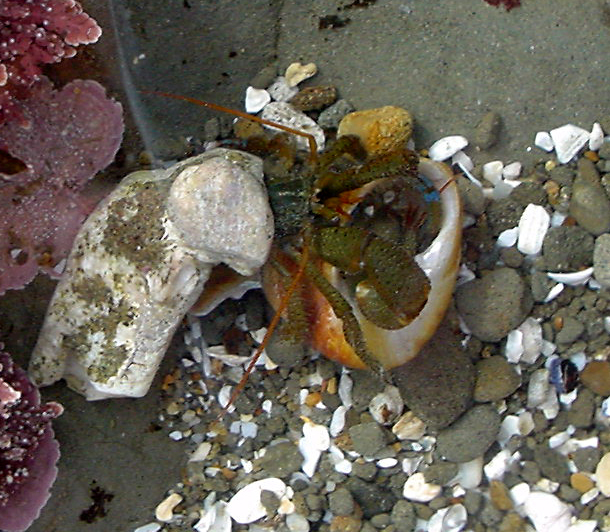
Hermit crabs fighting over a shell

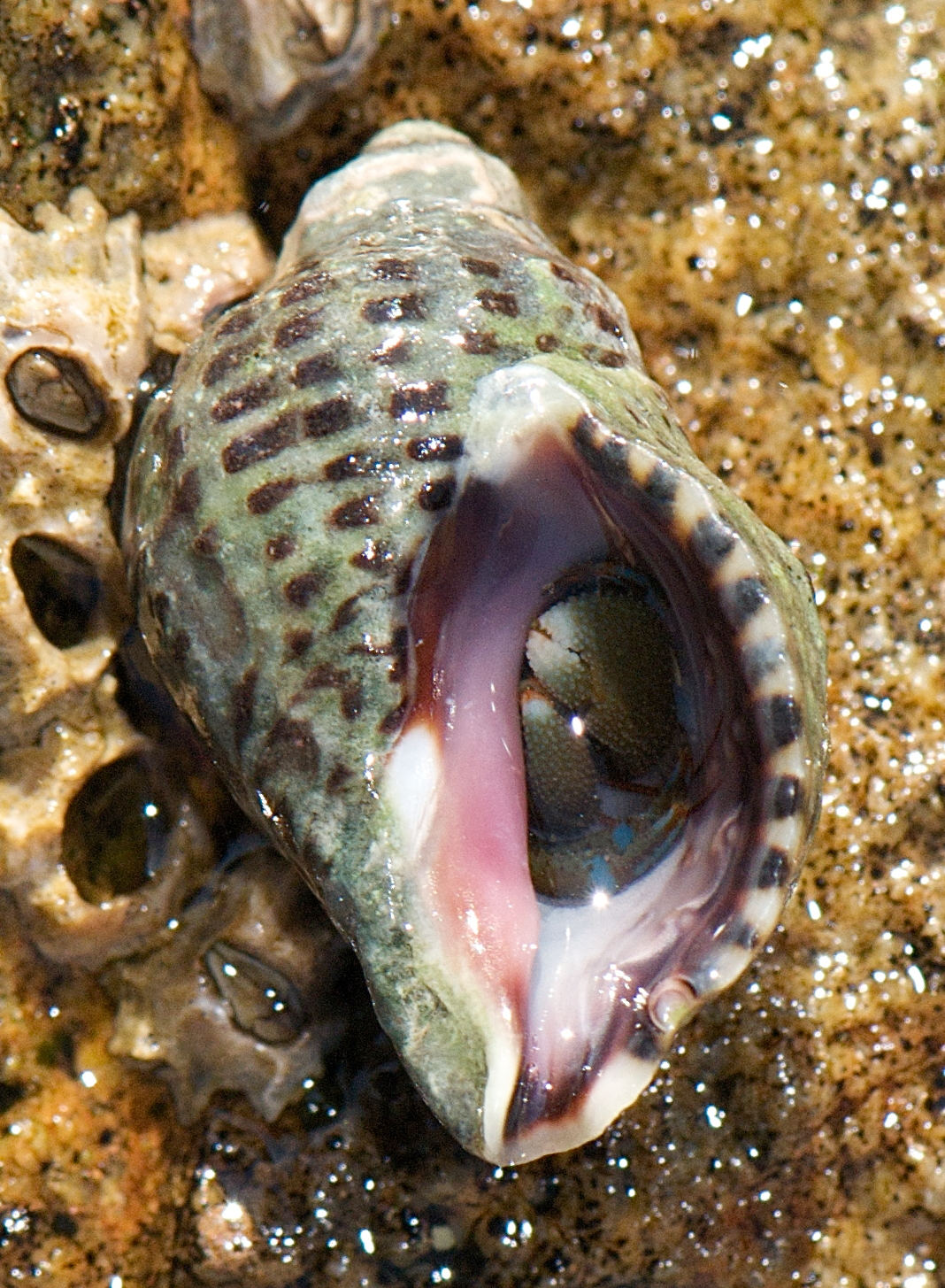
A hermit crab retracted into a shell of Acanthina punctulata and using its claws to block the entrance

As hermit crabs grow, they require larger shells. Since suitable intact gastropod shells are sometimes a limited resource, competition often occurs between hermit crabs for shells. The availability of empty shells at any given place depends on the relative abundance of gastropods and hermit crabs, matched for size. An equally important issue is the population of organisms that prey upon gastropods and leave the shells intact. Hermit crabs kept together may fight or kill a competitor to gain access to the shell they favour. However, if the crabs vary significantly in size, fights over empty shells are rare. Hermit crabs with undersized shells cannot grow as fast as those with well-fitting shells, and are more likely to be eaten if they cannot retract completely into the shell.

While marine hermit crabs have a readily available supply of gastropod shells, shells used by terrestrial hermit crabs have usually been remodeled by previous hermit crab owners. This involves a hermit crab hollowing out the shell, making it lighter. Only small hermit crabs are able to live without remodelled shells. In an experimental setting, most big hermit crabs that are transferred to a size-matched normal shell die. Even if they were able to survive, hollowing out a shell takes precious energy, making it undesirable to any hermit crab. They achieve this remodeling by both chemically and physically carving out the interiors of their shell. These shells can last for generations, explaining why some hermit crabs are able to live in areas where snails have become locally extinct.

There are cases when seashells are not available and hermit crabs will use alternatives such as tin cans, custom-made shells, or any other types of debris, which often proves fatal to the hermit crabs (as they can climb into, but not out of, slippery plastic debris). This can even create a chain reaction of fatality, because a dead hermit crab will release a signal to tell others that a shell is available, luring more hermit crabs to their deaths. More specifically, they are attracted to the scent of dead hermit crab flesh.

For some larger marine species, supporting one or more sea anemones on the shell can scare away predators. The sea anemone also benefits, because it is in a prime position to consume fragments of the hermit crab's meals. Other very close symbiotic relationships are known from encrusting bryozoans and hermit crabs forming bryoliths.

In February 2024, Polish researchers reported that 10 of 16 terrestrial hermit crab species were observed using artificial shells, including discarded plastic waste, broken glass bottles and light bulbs, in lieu of natural shells.

=== Shell exchanging ===
Shell exchanging is a behavioural interaction observed in all hermit crab species. It is an elaborate interaction in which a hermit crab attempts to exchange its shell with that of another, presumably to obtain a better shell fit. These interactions are usually between individuals of the same species, but they can also occur between different species.

When two hermit crabs engage in shell-exchanging behaviour, one crab (the "initiator") first approaches the other (the "non-initiator"). Antennal contact between the crabs may occur, followed by one of three events:

1. A cheliped extension on the part of one or both crabs (an aggressive threatening gesture).
2. A retreat by one crab away from the other.
3. A withdrawal into its shell of the non-initiator.

In the latter case, the initiator then grasps the non-initiator's shell with its chelipeds and/or ambulatories, and examines the external features of the shell. The initiator then turns the non-initiator's shell so that its aperture is uppermost. The initiator may hold the shell with its ambulatories while exploring the aperture with one or both chelipeds. At this point the non-initiator may execute cheliped flicks (moving one or both chelipeds through a 30° arc). Next, the initiator rocks the non-initiator's shell back and forth a few times before commencing shell rapping, in which the initiator strikes its shell against that of the non-initiator in a series of strong, rapid, and rhythmic movements. After a variable number of raps, the initiator grasps one or more of the non-initiator's limbs; the non-initiator then allows itself to be pulled out of its shell. The initiator then explores both the external and internal architecture of the vacated shell. At this stage, the naked non-initiator may approach the initiator while executing a cheliped extension, and is usually driven away by snapping movements of the initiator's chelipeds. The initiator then enters the vacated shell, following which one of two events may occur: either it returns to its original shell and retreats, or it remains in the new shell and investigates its old shell thoroughly. After the initiator retreats in its chosen shell, the non-initiator locates and enters the remaining shell.

Some controversy exists as to whether shell-exchanging behaviour is coercive or cooperative in nature; in the latter case, an interaction concludes in an exchange only if both crabs gain better-fitting shells from it. The availability of discarded mollusc shells in the crabs' habitat, and the life-stage of the crabs themselves, may be determining factors.

Several hermit crab species, both terrestrial and marine, have been observed forming a vacancy chain to exchange shells. When an individual crab finds a new empty shell, or obtains one from another, it will leave its own shell and inspect the vacant shell for size. If the shell is found to be too large, the crab goes back to its own shell and then waits by the vacant shell for up to 8 hours. As new crabs arrive they also inspect the shell and, if it is too big, wait with the others, forming a group of up to 20 individuals, holding onto each other in a line from the largest to the smallest crab. As soon as a crab that is the right size for the vacant shell arrives and claims it, leaving its old shell vacant. All the crabs in the "queue" swiftly exchange shells in sequence, each one moving up to the next size. If the original shell was taken from another hermit crab, the victim is usually left without a shell, leaving it vulnerable to predation.

Hermit crabs have been observed to "gang up" on an individual in possession of what they assess to be a better shell, and pry its shell away from it before competing for it until one takes it over.

=== Aggressive behavior ===
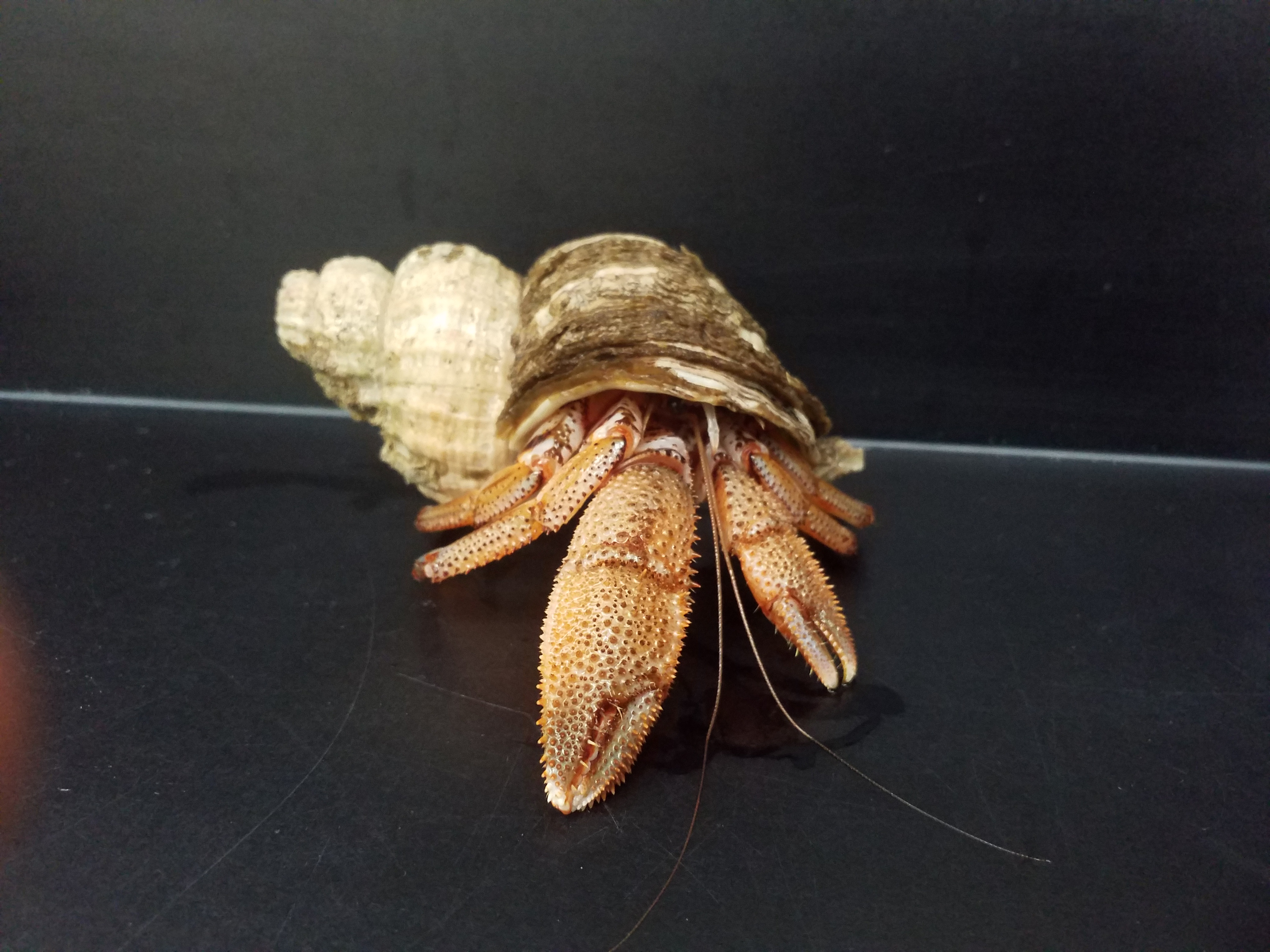
Pagurus armatus doing an aggressive display

Aggressive behaviors for hermit crabs are quite similar, with some variation between species. It usually consists of moving or positioning the legs and the chelipeds, also known as the claw or pincer. Usually these displays are enough to avoid confrontation. Sometimes two opposing crabs perform multiple actions, with no apparent pattern. The confrontations usually last a few seconds, though some may last a few minutes.

They may raise a leg, sometimes referred to as an "ambulatory raise". This can happen with multiple legs such as with the first two walking legs, or both the first and second pair. These actions are called a "double ambulatory raise" and a "quadruple ambulatory raise" respectively. The exact form of this movement varies between species. In some other species there is another distinct movement, where they move their leg away and upwards from the body, while it moves forwards, the movement continuing as the limb is brought down. This is sometimes called an "ambulatory poke".

They use their chelipeds as a warning display, usually in two distinct variations. The first consists of the crab lifting its whole body (shell included), and spreading its legs, then moving its cheliped forward until the dactylus (top part of the claw) is perpendicular with the ground. This is usually called a "cheliped presentation". This position may be more distinct in some species, such as those in the genus Pagurus. The second variation, the "cheliped extension", is usually a purely visual movement, though it is sometimes used to strike a crab. The chelipeds move forward and upwards, until the limb is parallel with the ground, usually used to push another crab out of the way. If a larger crab pushes a smaller one, the smaller one may be moved multiple centimeters.

The crabs of the family Paguridae, have another distinct type of movement. Individuals may crawl upon another's crab shell. If the size is just right, the crab climbed upon may move rapidly up and down or sideways, usually causing the other crab to fall off.

=== Grouping behavior ===
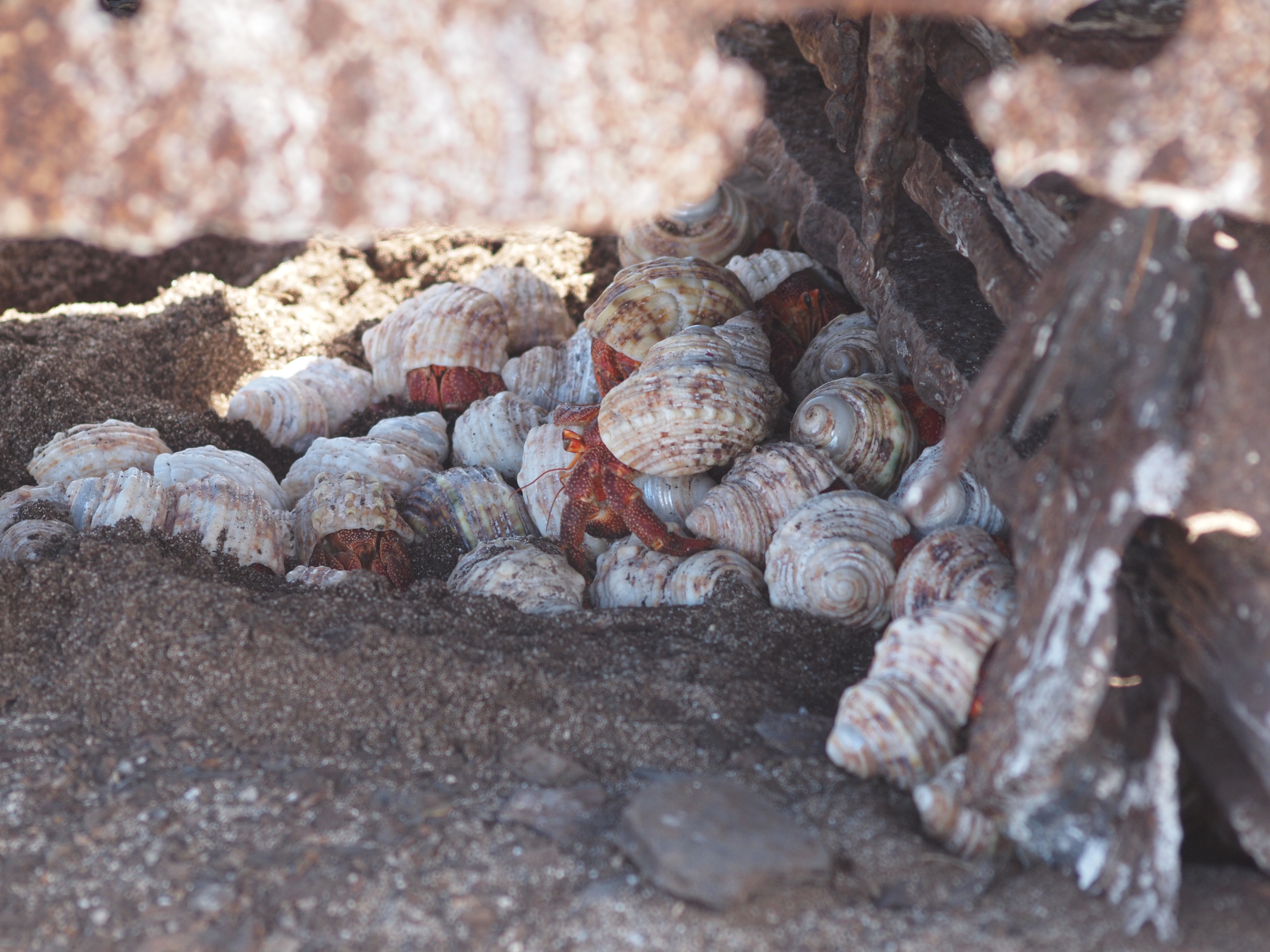
Coenobita perlatus

Some species such as Clibanarius tricolor, Calcinus tibicen and Pagurus miamensis are semi gregarious, showing unique behaviors in groups. While these three species all show gregarious behavior, C. tricolor, forms the densest and bigger groups. The crabs of Clibanarius tricolor congregate during the day, and usually stay with their same respective group, day after day. At 4:00 p.m. the crabs would start moving in their groups, and by 5:00 p.m. they had left their congregation. The congregations usually move in one general direction, and may be close to other crabs. This behavior seems to be lost under controlled conditions, however.

=== Associations with other animals ===
The shells of hermit crabs have multiple "associates" whose exact roles have not been well described. These associates are usually categorized into two groups: those which live in the interior of the shell, and those which live on the exterior. Some of the interior associates include nereid worms which have a commensal relation; the worms help the hermit crabs keep their shell clean along with the crabs of the family Porcellanidae. It is not rare to see both the worms and crabs in the same shell.

There are associations with Amphipods, such as between the hermit crab species Pagurus hemphilli and the amphipod genus Liljeborgia. The coloration of this amphipod matches the coloration of the hermit crab and the crustose coralline algae which commonly grow on their shells. Specimens of P. hemphilli tolerated the presence of their guest, while other hermit crab species attempted to eat them.

Some of the exterior associates are the epifauna, such as barnacles and the slipper limpet Crepidula, which may be a hindrance to the crabs, as they may ruin the stability or just add weight to the shell. Some species of hermit crabs have live colonies of Hydractina, while others reject them. Some species just keep the colony in their shells, while others are actively detaching and re-attaching the sea anemone. Most hermit crabs attempt to place the most anemones as possible, while some others steal the anemone another hermit crab is carrying. There is a mutually beneficial relationship between the two, as they help defend against predators.

== As pets ==
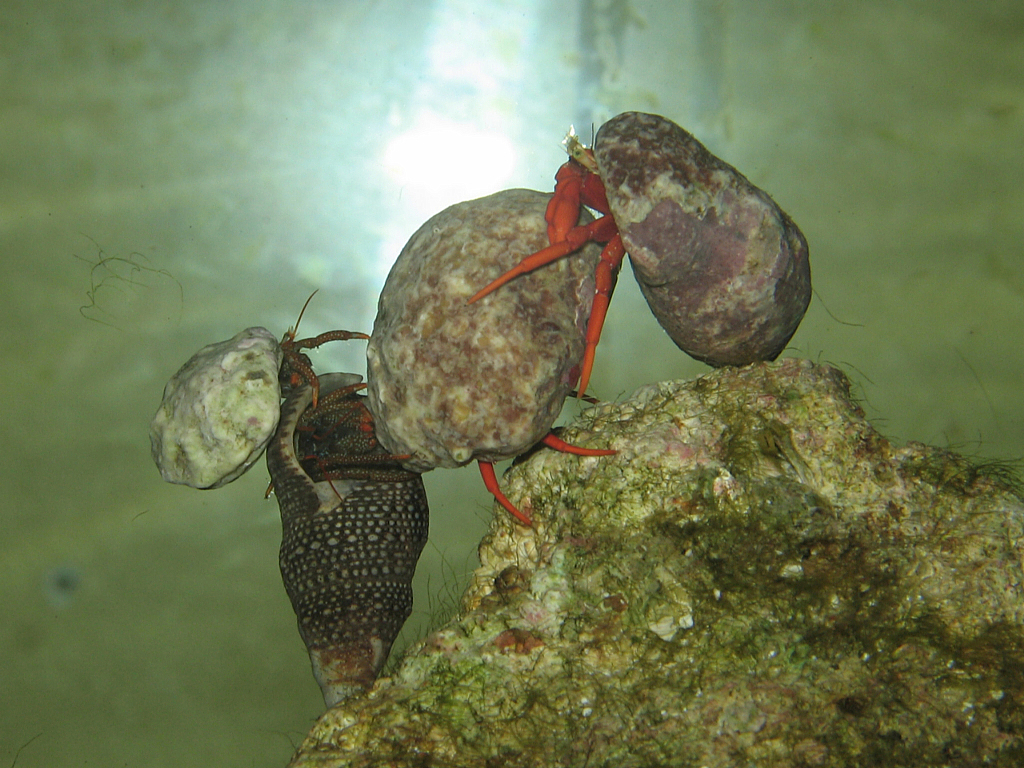
Four hermit crabs in an aquarium

Several marine species of hermit crabs are common in the marine aquarium trade. They are commonly kept in reef fish tanks.

Two of the most common terrestrial hermit crabs kept as pets are the Caribbean hermit crab (Coenobita clypeatus), and the Ecuadorian hermit crab (Coenobita compressus). Despite their reputation as 'throwaway' and 'low maintenance' pets, hermit crabs can actually live for up to 15 or more years with proper care. The oldest known pet hermit crab lived for 45 years. Hermit crabs need a proper tank set up that will provide all of their needs in order to thrive. Hermit crabs should not be regularly handled, they are prey animals and typically panic while being handled, which can cause injury to the crab or the owner. Hermit crabs will try to hide when scared. They will also pinch, which can break skin. A drop or a fall onto hard surfaces can be lethal to a hermit crab.

Hermit crabs need a consistent temperature of 75–85 °F (24–30 °C), and a consistent humidity of 75–85%. Low humidity will result in a hermit crab slowly suffocating. Hermit crabs breathe using modified gills. These modified gills need to be moist in order to function. Hermit crabs should be kept in glass tanks of an appropriate size in order to maintain the humidity and temperature needed. At least 10 gallons of tank space should be provided per hermit crab. Overcrowding a tank can result in aggressiveness and cannibalism between crabs.

Hermit crabs also require both salt water and freshwater sources deep enough for the crab to fully submerge. All water should be treated to remove chemicals, and saltwater should be prepared using a marine grade salt mix. Further, like many pets, hermit crabs need enrichment and need opportunities for hiding and climbing. Huts, wood, and artificial plants can be used to fill this need. In the wild hermit crabs may walk several miles a night for purposes of foraging or migration. Hermit crabs are nocturnal and are most active during the night.
