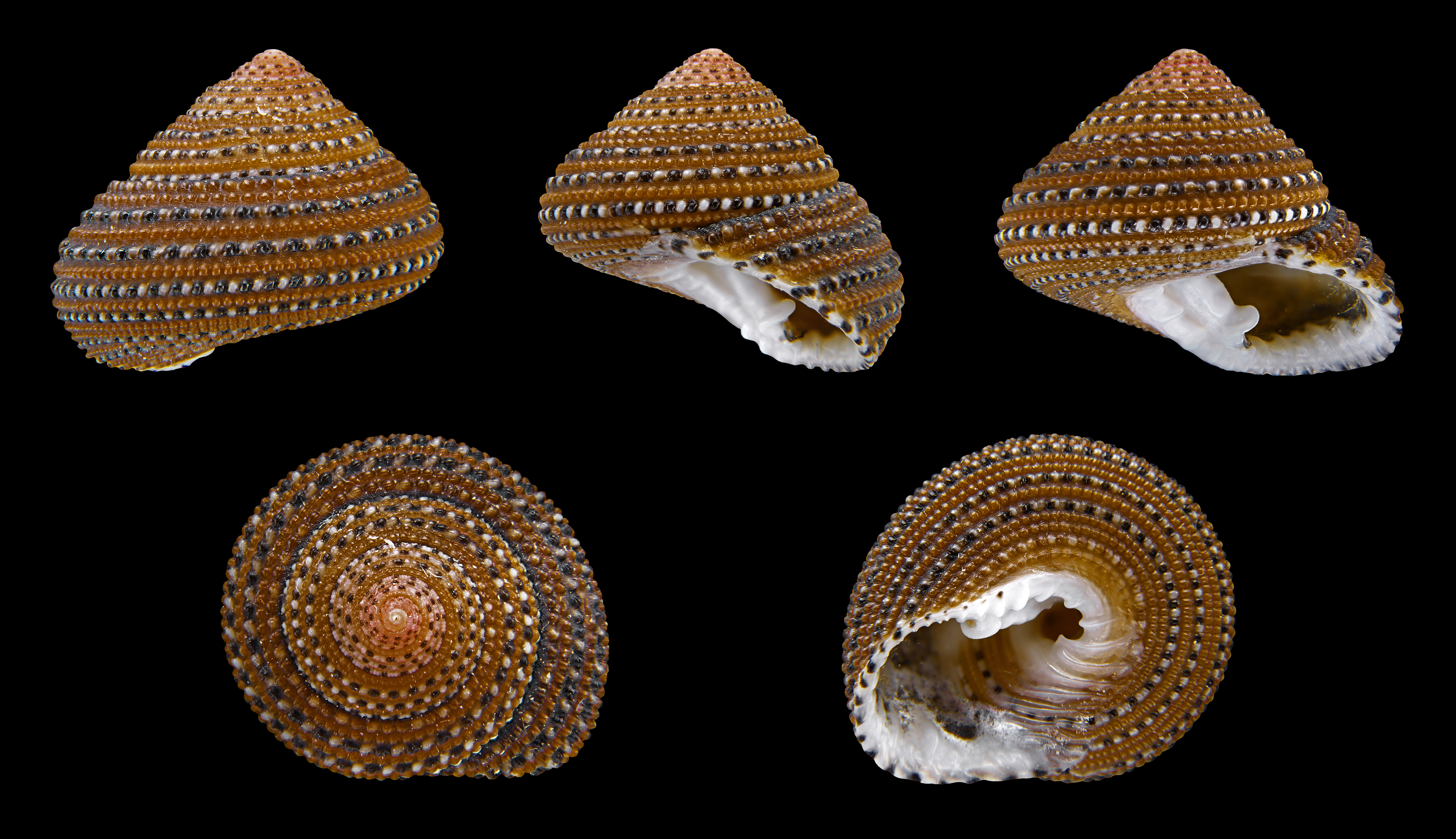
- A shell of Clanculus ormophorus

Scientific classification
- Kingdom: Animalia
- Phylum: Mollusca
- Class: Gastropoda
- Subclass: Vetigastropoda
- Order: Trochida
- Superfamily: Trochoidea
- Family: Trochidae
- Genus: Clanculus; Montfort, 1810

Type species
- Trochus pharaonius Linnaeus, 1758

Synonyms
- Clanculus (Clanculopsis) Monterosato, 1888; Clangulus Blainville, 1817; Euclanculus Cotton & Godfrey, 1934; Euriclanculus Cotton & Godfrey, 1934; Fragella Swainson, 1840; Isoclanculus Cotton & Godfrey, 1934; Macroclanculus Cotton & Godfrey, 1934; Mesoclanculus Iredale, 1924; Microclanculus Cotton & Godfrey, 1934; Otavia Risso, 1826; Trochus (Belangeria) P. Fischer, 1879; Trochus (Clanculus) Montfort, 1810

= Clanculus =

Genus of gastropods

Clanculus is a genus of sea snail, marine gastropod molluscs of the family Trochidae, the top shells.

== Distribution ==
Clanculus is an old genus. Fossils found in Italy date from the Pliocene (C. corallinus, C. elevatus, C. bonfittoi, C. jussieui) The distribution of this genus is worldwide, individuals of some species sometimes occur in great numbers, from the intertidal zone up to depths of 200 m. Many species can be found in Australia, New Zealand, the Indo-Pacific, Philippines, Sri Lanka, Seychelles, Japan, South Africa, Zanzibar, Indian Ocean, the Red Sea, West Africa, Angola, North Africa and Europe.

== Shell description ==
These top shells are wide-conical and low spired. Their spirally ribbed sculpture consists of conspicuous regular rows of robust, round beads. The whorls show a profile with a deep suture and the final whorl inflated. The aperture of the shell is oval, with a strongly ridged lip. The umbilicus is generally deep. The color of the shell varies between orange, dark red, and chocolate brown.

== Species ==
The type species, Clanculus pharaonius, was described by Carl Linnaeus in 1758 as Trochus pharaonius.

- † Clanculus adesus (Marwick, 1931)
- Clanculus albanyensis Jansen, 1995
- Clanculus albinus A. Adams, 1853
- Clanculus albugo (Watson, 1880)
- Clanculus aloysii Tenison Woods, 1876
- † Clanculus angiolianus Spadini, 2006
- † Clanculus araonis (Basterot, 1825)
- Clanculus ater Pilsbry, 1911
- Clanculus atricatena J.R. Tomlin, 1921
- Clanculus atypicus Iredale, 1912
- † Clanculus baccatus (Defrance 1824)
- Clanculus berthelotii (d'Orbigny, 1840)
- Clanculus bicarinatus Angas, 1880
- † Clanculus bonfittoi Chirli, 2004
- Clanculus boyeti Poppe, Tagaro & Dekker, 2006
- † Clanculus brebioni Landau, Van Dingenen & Ceulemans, 2017
- Clanculus bronni (R.W. Dunker, 1860)
- Clanculus brunneus A. Adams, 1853
- Clanculus buijsei Poppe, Tagaro & Dekker, 2006
- † Clanculus cerberi (Brongniart, 1823)
- Clanculus ceylonicus G.& H. Nevill, 1869
- Clanculus clanguloides Wood, 1828
- Clanculus clangulus (Wood, 1828)
- Clanculus collingei Melvill, 1904
- Clanculus comarilis Ch. Hedley, 1912
- Clanculus consobrinus R. Tate, 1893
- Clanculus corallinus (Gmelin, 1791)
- Clanculus cristinae Rubio & Rolan, 2002
- Clanculus cruciatus (Linnaeus, 1758)
- Clanculus denticulatus (Gray, 1827)
- Clanculus depictus A. Adams, 1854
- Clanculus dunkeri (Koch, 1843)
- † Clanculus echinasteris Vera-Peláez, 2022
- Clanculus edentulus A. Adams, 1853
- Clanculus elevatus Spadini, 1986
- Clanculus escondidus Poppe, Tagaro & Vilvens, 2009
- Clanculus eucarinatus Monfort 1810
- Clanculus euchelioides R. Tate, 1893
- Clanculus flagellatus (Philippi, 1848)
- Clanculus floridus (Philippi, 1850)
- Clanculus flosculus Fischer, 1880
- Clanculus gemmulifer H. A. Pilsbry, 1901
- † Clanculus granifer (Pantanelli, 1888)
- Clanculus granti Ch. Hedley, 1907
- Clanculus guineensis Gmelin, 1791
- † Clanculus gulyasi Kovács, Leél-Őssy & Vicián, 2023
- † Clanculus hoernesi (Pantanelli, 1888)
- † Clanculus infraeocaenicus (Cossmann, 1892)
- Clanculus johnstoni Ch. Hedley, 1917
- Clanculus jucundus Gould, 1861
- Clanculus jussieui (Payraudeau, 1826)
- Clanculus korkosi Singer et al., 2000
- † Clanculus krachi Nosowska, 2020
- Clanculus kraussii (Philippi, 1846)
- † Clanculus landaui Spadini, 2006
- Clanculus largillierti (Philippi, 1849)
- Clanculus laurae Cecalupo, Buzzurro & Mariani, 2008
- Clanculus leucomphalus Verco, 1905
- Clanculus limbatus (Quoy & Gaimard, 1834)
- † Clanculus lutosus Kensley & Pether, 1986
- † Clanculus manganellii Spadini, 2006
- Clanculus margaritarius (Philippi, 1849)
- Clanculus mariaemaris Rubio & Rolan, 2002
- † Clanculus marqueti Spadini, 2006
- Clanculus maugeri (Wood, 1828)
- Clanculus mauritianus Melvill, 1909
- Clanculus maxillatus (C.T. Menke, 1843)
- Clanculus microdon Monfort 1810
- Clanculus miniatus (H.E. Anton, 1839)
- Clanculus mixtus E.A. Smith, 1903
- Clanculus multipunctatus Jansen, 1995
- † Clanculus murrayi Carrington & Kensley, 1969
- Clanculus natalensis Herbert, 1993
- † Clanculus ozennei Crosse, 1862
- Clanculus peccatus (H. J. Finlay, 1926)
- Clanculus persicus Habe & Shikama, 1964
- Clanculus personatus (Philippi, 1846)
- Clanculus petziae Rubio & Rolan, 2002
- Clanculus pharaonius (Linnaeus, 1758)
- Clanculus philippii (Koch, 1843)
- Clanculus pini Rubio & Rolan, 2002
- Clanculus plebejus (Philippi, 1851)
- † Clanculus praecruciatus Mikhailovsky, 1903
- † Clanculus pseudoaraonis (Strausz, 1960)
- Clanculus pseudocorallinus Gofas, 1984
- Clanculus puniceus (Philippi, 1846)
- Clanculus quadricingulatus Ludbrook N.H., 1941
- † Clanculus relictus Kosuge & Koizumi, 1990
- † Clanculus rembangensis (Wanner & Hahn, 1935)
- Clanculus richeri Vilvens, 2000
- Clanculus ringens C.T. Menke, 1843
- † Clanculus robustus Friedberg, 1928
- Clanculus samoensis (Hombron & Jacquinot, 1848)
- † Clanculus sancticlementensis Landau, Van Dingenen & Ceulemans, 2017
- Clanculus santamariae Gofas, 1984
- Clanculus satrapius (E. von Martens, 1874)
- Clanculus scabrosus (Philippi, 1850)
- Clanculus scotti Poppe, Tagaro & Dekker, 2006
- Clanculus simoni Poppe, Tagaro & Dekker, 2006
- Clanculus spadiceus Philippi, 1848
- Clanculus stigmatarius A. Adams, 1853
- Clanculus textilosus A. Adams, 1853
- Clanculus thomasi (Crosse, 1864)
- Clanculus tonnerrei (G. Nevill & H. Nevill, 1874)
- † Clanculus tricingulatus Ludbrook, 1978
- † Clanculus tuberculatus (Eichwald, 1830)
- † Clanculus turriculatus Sacco, 1896
- † Clanculus umbilicovadus Landau, Van Dingenen & Ceulemans, 2017
- Clanculus undatoides J. E. Tennison-Woods, 1879
- Clanculus undatus (Lamarck, 1816)
- † Clanculus valdecinctus Fontannes, 1878
- † Clanculus verai Lozano-Francisco & Vera-Peláez, 2002
- Clanculus villanus (Philippi, 1846)
- Clanculus waltonae Sowerby, 1892

Species brought into synonymy

- Clanculus alfredensis Bartsch, 1915: synonym of Clanculus miniatus (Anton, 1838)
- Clanculus angeli Tenison-Woods, 1877: synonym of Clanculus plebejus (Philippi, 1852)
- Clanculus assabensis Caramagna, 1888 : synonym of Clanculus tonnerrei (G. Nevill & H. Nevill, 1874)
- Clanculus becki Turton, 1932: synonym of Clanculus miniatus (Anton, 1838)
- Clanculus bicrenatus Gould, 1849: synonym of Trochus bicrenatus Gould, 1849
- Clanculus blainvillii Cantraine, 1842: synonym of Clanculus jussieui (Payraudeau, 1826)
- Clanculus blandus Dunker, 1865 (nomen nudum): synonym of Clanculus stigmatarius A. Adams, 1853
- Clanculus callicoccus (Philippi, 1849): synonym of Trochus callicoccus Philippi, 1849
- Clanculus capensis (Gmelin, 1791): synonym of Gibbula capensis (Gmelin, 1791)
- Clanculus carinatus A. Adams, 1853: synonym of Clanculus miniatus (Anton, 1838)
- Clanculus cariniferus (Beck in Reeve, 1842): synonym of Trochus cariniferus Reeve, 1842
- Clanculus clippertonensis Hertlein & Emerson 1953: synonym of Homalopoma clippertonense (Hertlein & Emerson, 1953)
- Clanculus concavus (Gmelin): synonym of Infundibulum concavum (Gmelin, 1791)
- Clanculus conspersus A. Adams, 1853 : synonym of Clanculus philippi (Koch in Philippi, 1843)
- Clanculus couturii Payraudeau, 1826: synonym of Clanculus corallinus (Gmelin, 1791)
- Clanculus crassilabrum Sowerby III,1905: synonym of Herpetopoma crassilabrum (G. B. Sowerby III, 1905)
- Clanculus danieli Crosse, 1862: synonym of Eurytrochus danieli (Crosse, 1862)
- Clanculus dominicanus Tenison-Woods, 1877: synonym of Clanculus plebejus (Philippi, 1852)
- Clanculus elevatus Turton, 1932: synonym of Clanculus miniatus (Anton, 1838)
- Clanculus eucosmia Turton, 1932: synonym of Clanculus miniatus (Anton, 1838)
- Clanculus gatliffi Tomlin, 1924: synonym of Clanculus euchelioides Tate, 1893
- Clanculus gemmatus Gould, 1845: synonym of Euchelus gemmatus (Gould, 1845)
- Clanculus gennesi Fischer, 1901 : synonym of Clanculus tonnerrei (G. Nevill & H. Nevill, 1874)
- Clanculus gibbonsi Sowerby : synonym of Clanculus tonnerrei (G. Nevill & H. Nevill, 1874)
- Clanculus gibbosus A. Adams, 1853: synonym of Clanculus floridus (Philippi, 1850)
- Clanculus granosus J. Brazier, 1877 : synonym of Clanculus bronni Dunker, 1860
- Clanculus granoliratus Monterosato, 1889 : synonym of Clanculus jussieui (Payraudeau, 1826)
- Clanculus hizenensis Pilsbry, 1901: synonym of Clanculus bronni Dunker, 1860
- Clanculus howeinsulae Salisbury, 1936: synonym of Clanculus thomasi (Crosse, 1862)
- Clanculus kinzelbachi F. Nordsieck, 1982: synonym of Clanculus jussieui (Payraudeau, 1826)
- Clanculus kochii Philippi, 1844: synonym of Trochus kochii Philippi, 1844
- Clanculus kowiensis Turton, 1932: synonym of Clanculus miniatus (Anton, 1838)
- Clanculus kraussi Philippi in Martini & Chemnitz, 1849 : synonym of Clanculus atricatena Tomlin, 1921
- Clanculus laceyi G. B. Sowerby, 1889: synonym of Clanculus miniatus (Anton, 1838)
- Clanculus maculosus A. Adams, 1853: synonym of Clanculus limbatus (Quoy & Gaimard, 1834)
- Clanculus microdon ater H. A. Pilsbry, 1911 : synonym of Clanculus ater Pilsbry, 1901
- Clanculus miniatus (Anton, 1838) sensu Macnae & Kalk, 1969: synonym of Clanculus puniceus (Philippi, 1846)
- Clanculus miniatus auct.: synonym of Clanculus waltonae Sowerby III, 1892
- Clanculus nodiliratus A. Adams, 1853: synonym of Clanculus plebejus (Philippi, 1852)
- Clanculus nodulosus A. Adams, 1855: synonym of Trochus ferreirai Bozzetti, 1996
- Clanculus ochroleucus (Philippi, 1853): synonym of Clanculus albanyensis Jansen, 1995
- Clanculus omalomphalus A. Adams, 1853: synonym of Clanculus brunneus Adams, 1853
- Clanculus patagonicus d'Orbigny, 1835: synonym of Tegula patagonica (d'Orbigny, 1835)
- Clanculus peccatus (Finlay, 1927): synonym of Clanculus (Paraclanculus) peccatus (Finlay, 1926)
- Clanculus philomenae Tenison-Woods, 1876: synonym of Clanculus philippi (Koch in Philippi, 1843)
- Clanculus plabeius Pritchard & Gatliff, 1902: synonym of Clanculus plebejus (Philippi, 1852)
- Clanculus puniceus (Linnaeus, 1758): synonym of Clanculus atricatena Tomlin, 1921
- Clanculus purpuratus Pilsbry, 1889: synonym of Clanculus philippi (Koch in Philippi, 1843)
- Clanculus radiatus Gmelin, 1791: synonym of Trochus radiatus Gmelin, 1791
- Clanculus raphaeli Tenison-Woods, 1877: synonym of Clanculus philippi (Koch in Philippi, 1843)
- Clanculus rotellina A. A. Gould, 1849 : synonym of Camitia rotellina (Gould, 1849)
- Clanculus rubens ("A. Adams") Angas, 1865: synonym of Clanculus dunkeri Koch in Philippi, 1843
- Clanculus samoensis Rousseau in Hombron, J.B. & C.H. Jacquinot, 1877: synonym of Clanculus atropurpureus (Gould, 1849)
- Clanculus septenarius (Melvill & Standen, 1899): synonym of Pulchrastele septenaria (Melvill & Standen, 1899)
- Clanculus trochiformis Turton, 1932: synonym of Clanculus miniatus (Anton, 1838)
- Clanculus unedo (A. Adams, 1853): synonym of Clanculus margaritarius (Philippi, 1846)
- Clanculus variegatus A. Adams, 1853: synonym of Clanculus limbatus (Quoy & Gaimard, 1834)
- Clanculus yatesii Crosse, 1863: synonym of Clanculus philippii (Koch in Philippi, 1843)
- Clanculus zebrides A. Adams, 1853: synonym of Clanculus brunneus Adams, 1853
