= Clanculus bicarinatus =

Scientific classification
- Kingdom: Animalia
- Phylum: Mollusca
- Class: Gastropoda
- Subclass: Vetigastropoda
- Order: Trochida
- Superfamily: Trochoidea
- Family: Trochidae
- Genus: Clanculus
- Species: C. bicarinatus

Binomial name
- Clanculus bicarinatus Angas, 1880

Species of gastropod

Clanculus bicarinatus is a species of sea snail, a marine gastropod mollusk in the family Trochidae, the top snails.

== Distribution ==
This marine species occurs in the Eastern Indian Ocean, Indo-Arabia, Oceania, the Indo-West Pacific and Australia (Northern Territory, Queensland, Western Australia).
