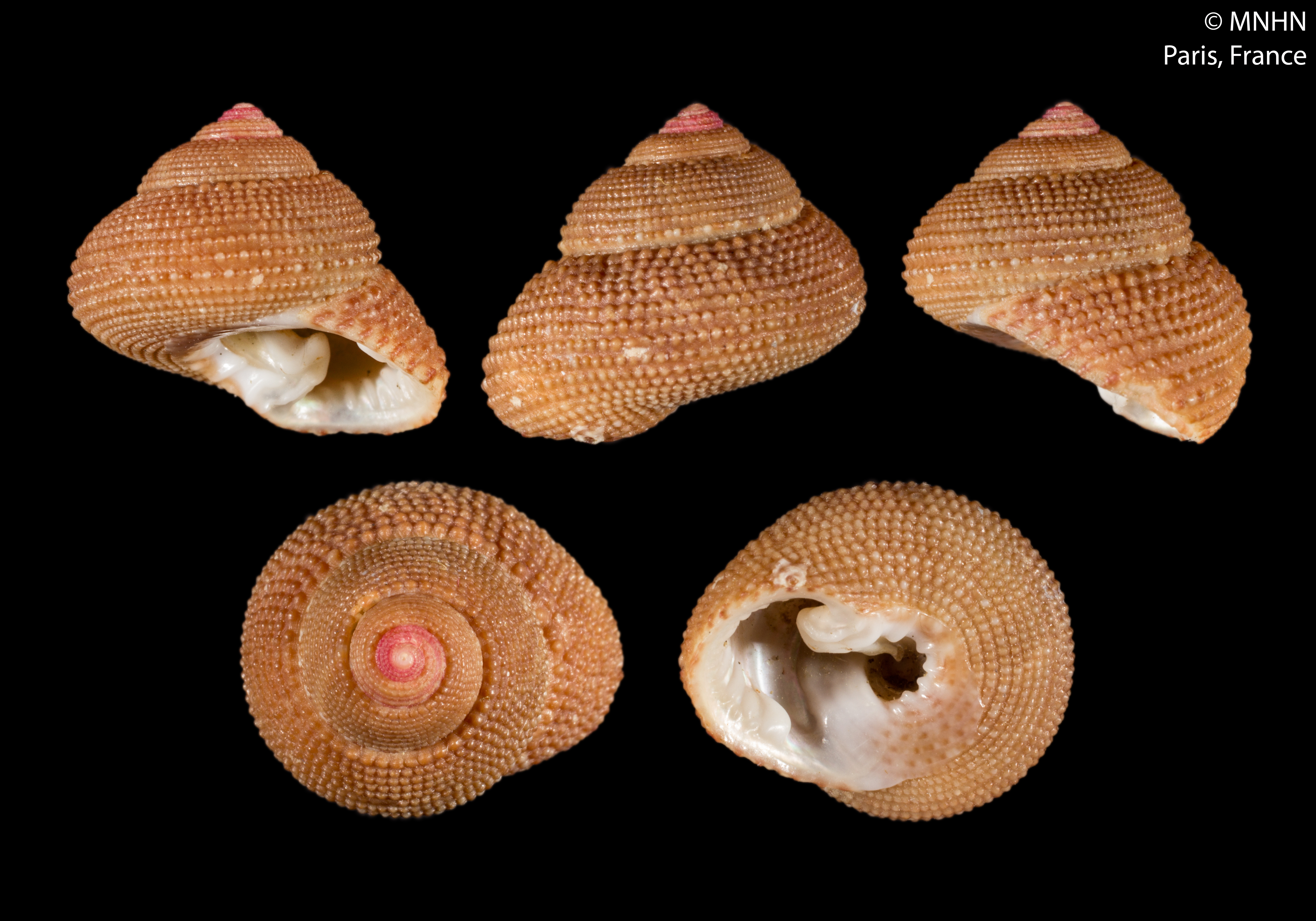
- Shell of Clanculus pini (holotype at MNHN, Paris)

Scientific classification
- Kingdom: Animalia
- Phylum: Mollusca
- Class: Gastropoda
- Subclass: Vetigastropoda
- Order: Trochida
- Superfamily: Trochoidea
- Family: Trochidae
- Genus: Clanculus
- Species: C. pini

Binomial name
- Clanculus pini Rubio & Rolan, 2002

= Clanculus pini =

Species of gastropod

Clanculus pini is a species of sea snail, a marine gastropod mollusk in the family Trochidae, the top snails.

== Description ==
The size of the shell attains 11 mm.

== Distribution ==
This species occurs in the Atlantic Ocean off Senegal and Ghana.
