= Clanculus edentulus =

Scientific classification
- Kingdom: Animalia
- Phylum: Mollusca
- Class: Gastropoda
- Subclass: Vetigastropoda
- Order: Trochida
- Superfamily: Trochoidea
- Family: Trochidae
- Genus: Clanculus
- Species: C. edentulus

Binomial name
- Clanculus edentulus (A. Adams, 1853)

Synonyms
- Euchelus edentulus A. Adams, 1853 (original combination)

Species of gastropod

Clanculus edentulus is a species of sea snail, a marine gastropod mollusk in the family Trochidae, the bottom snails.

OBIS (the Indo-Pacific Molluscan Database) declares this species an Incertae Sedis (with uncertain taxonomic placement ).

== Description ==
The shell has an orbiculate-conoid shape. It is dirty red with white spots. The transverse ribs are granulated. The whorls are slightly convex. The umbilical margin is subcrenulate. The top of the columella is plicate. The columella lacks a denticle and has three tubercles at its base. The inner lip is subsulcate.
