= Clanculus korkosi =

Scientific classification
- Kingdom: Animalia
- Phylum: Mollusca
- Class: Gastropoda
- Subclass: Vetigastropoda
- Order: Trochida
- Superfamily: Trochoidea
- Family: Trochidae
- Genus: Clanculus
- Species: C. korkosi

Binomial name
- Clanculus korkosi Singer, Mienis & Geiger, 2000

Species of gastropod

Clanculus korkosi is a species of sea snail, a marine gastropod mollusk in the family Trochidae, the top snails.

== Description ==
The height of the shell attains 14 mm.

== Distribution ==
This marine species occurs in the Red Sea.
