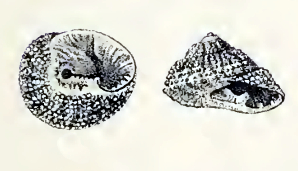
- Drawing showing two views of a shell of Clanculus flagellatus

Scientific classification
- Kingdom: Animalia
- Phylum: Mollusca
- Class: Gastropoda
- Subclass: Vetigastropoda
- Order: Trochida
- Superfamily: Trochoidea
- Family: Trochidae
- Genus: Clanculus
- Species: C. flagellatus

Binomial name
- Clanculus flagellatus (Philippi, 1848)

Synonyms
- Clanculus (Euriclanculus) flagellatus (Philippi, R.A., 1848); Trochus flagellatus Philippi, 1848

= Clanculus flagellatus =

Species of gastropod

Clanculus flagellatus is a species of sea snail, a marine gastropod mollusk in the family Trochidae, the top snails.

== Description ==
The size of the shell varies between 12 mm and 19 mm. The umbilicate, granulate shell has a conoid shape. It is white, painted with branching stripes of reddish purple. The whorls are convex, the last rounded. The; white base of the shell is convex. The penultimate whorl contains six series of granules, with the interstices as wide as the ridges, and is obliquely striate. The body whorl has eight series of granules above, nine on the base. The oblique columella is solute above, the edge rugose-denticulate, terminating below in a prominent tooth. The outer lip is rugose and dentate within. The whorls are pretty convex, especially above. The body whorl is rounded, deflected anteriorly and flattened. The penultimate whorl has six series of granules, which are the same width as their densely striate interstices. The body whorl however has eight, two new ones having been intercalated on the lower part, the eighth prominent, forming the periphery. The base of the shell is rather convex, and has nine close granulose lirae. The granules on the border of the umbilicus are but slightly developed. The aperture is about as in Clanculus pharaonius. The color of the shell is white, with numerous dark rose-red radiating, sometimes branching stripes above.

== Distribution ==
This marine species is endemic to Australia and occurs off South Australia, Tasmania, Victoria and Western Australia.
