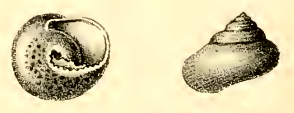
- Drawing showing two views of a shell of Clanculus spadiceus

Scientific classification
- Kingdom: Animalia
- Phylum: Mollusca
- Class: Gastropoda
- Subclass: Vetigastropoda
- Order: Trochida
- Superfamily: Trochoidea
- Family: Trochidae
- Genus: Clanculus
- Species: C. spadiceus

Binomial name
- Clanculus spadiceus (Philippi, 1848)

Synonyms
- Trochus ludwigi Krauss, 1848; Trochus spadiceus Philippi, 1848 (original description)

= Clanculus spadiceus =

Species of gastropod

Clanculus spadiceus is a species of sea snail, a marine gastropod mollusk in the family Trochidae, the top snails.

== Description ==
The height of the shell attains 10 mm, its diameter 14 mm. The thick, shining umbilicate shell has a conoid shape. The 5½ whorls are convex. The first whorl has a vivid rose color, the following chestnut-brown,. They are subcanaliculate at the suture, in the middle subangulate and minutely spirally cingulate. The ridges number about 9 on the penultimate whorl. The body whorl is carinated, slightly convex beneath and paler, white and brown maculate, concentrically marked with about 9 delicate lirae, the interstices radiately striate. The aperture is subtrapezoidal and plicate within. The lip is double. The basal margin is denticulate. The oblique columella is granulose without, above contorted, truncated below. The umbilical area is white, with an interior spiral ridge and is crenulated at its margin. The columellar callus is obsolete.

== Gallery ==
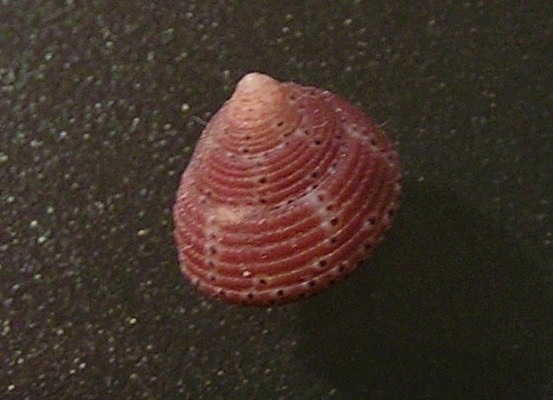

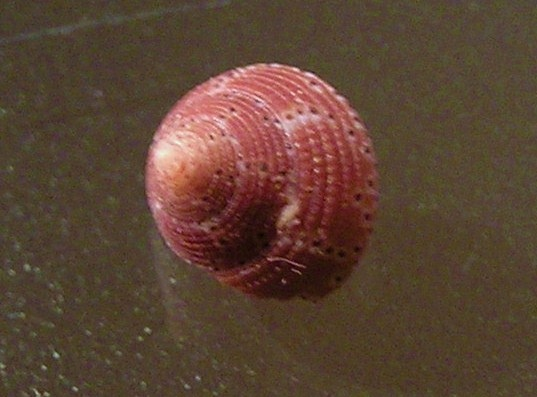

== Distribution ==
This marine species occurs in the Atlantic Ocean off São Tomé and Principe.
