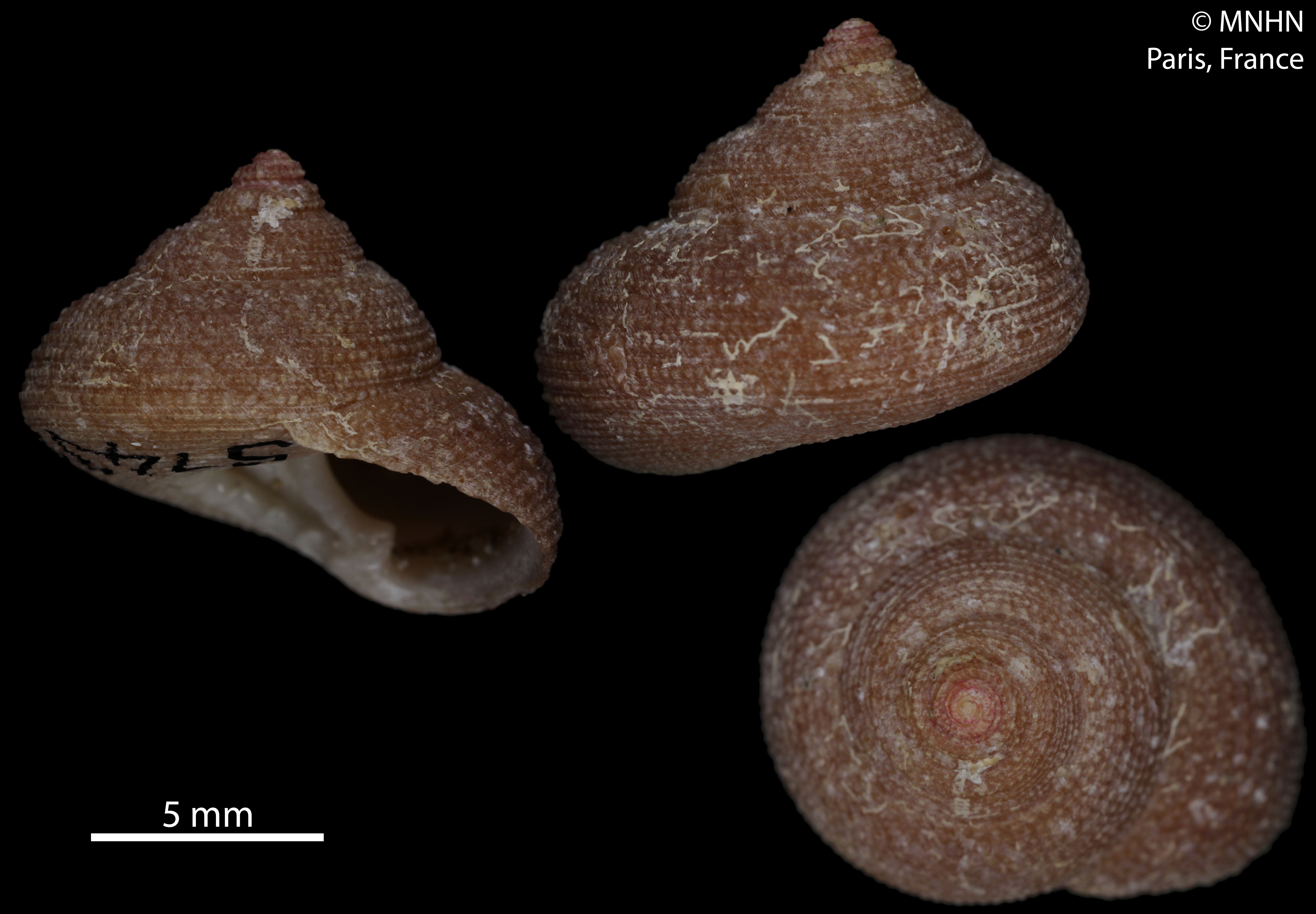
- Shell of Clanculus natalensis (paratype at MNHN, Paris)

Scientific classification
- Kingdom: Animalia
- Phylum: Mollusca
- Class: Gastropoda
- Subclass: Vetigastropoda
- Order: Trochida
- Superfamily: Trochoidea
- Family: Trochidae
- Genus: Clanculus
- Species: C. natalensis

Binomial name
- Clanculus natalensis Herbert, 1993

Synonyms
- Clanculus (Clanculus) natalensis Herbert, 1993

= Clanculus natalensis =

Species of gastropod

Clanculus natalensis is a species of sea snail, a marine gastropod mollusk in the family Trochidae, the top snails.

== Distribution ==
This marine species occurs off South Africa and Mozambique.
