= Clanculus mixtus =

Scientific classification
- Kingdom: Animalia
- Phylum: Mollusca
- Class: Gastropoda
- Subclass: Vetigastropoda
- Order: Trochida
- Superfamily: Trochoidea
- Family: Trochidae
- Genus: Clanculus
- Species: C. mixtus

Binomial name
- Clanculus mixtus E. A. Smith, 1903

Synonyms
- Clanculus (Clanculopsis) mixtus Smith, 1903

Species of gastropod

Clanculus mixtus is a species of sea snail, a marine gastropod mollusk in the family Trochidae, the top snails.

== Description ==
The size of the shell attains 12 mm.

== Distribution ==
This marine species occurs in the Indian Ocean off Port Elizabeth (Eastern Cape) to Southern KwaZuluNatal, South Africa.
