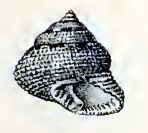
- Drawing showing a shell of Clanculus largillierti

Scientific classification
- Kingdom: Animalia
- Phylum: Mollusca
- Class: Gastropoda
- Subclass: Vetigastropoda
- Order: Trochida
- Superfamily: Trochoidea
- Family: Trochidae
- Genus: Clanculus
- Species: C. largillierti

Binomial name
- Clanculus largillierti (Philippi, 1849)

Synonyms
- Clanculus (Clanculus) largillierti (Philippi, 1849); Trochus largillierti Philippi, 1849

= Clanculus largillierti =

Species of gastropod

Clanculus largillierti is a species of sea snail, a marine gastropod mollusk in the family Trochidae, the top snails.

== Description ==
The height of the shell attains 14 mm, its diameter 16 mm. The perforate shell has a conoid shape with an acute apex and 6½ whorls. The first whorl is rosy, the following whorls convex, grayish, spotted with white and black at the narrow sutures. They are spirally lirate with numerous granulose lirae, 8 to 10 on the penultimate whorl. The body whorl is rounded, concentrically lirate beneath with 8 to 10 lirae, gray and brown articulated. The oblique aperture is rhomboidal. The lip is dentate above. The basal margin is plicate. The oblique columella is dentate at its base. The parietal callus is wrinkled. The umbilicus is bordered by strong white plicae.

== Distribution ==
This species occurs in the Indian Ocean off Réunion.
