= Clanculus eucarinatus =

Scientific classification
- Kingdom: Animalia
- Phylum: Mollusca
- Class: Gastropoda
- Subclass: Vetigastropoda
- Order: Trochida
- Superfamily: Trochoidea
- Family: Trochidae
- Genus: Clanculus
- Species: C. eucarinatus

Binomial name
- Clanculus eucarinatus Monfort, 1810

Species of gastropod

Clanculus eucarinatus is a species of sea snail, a marine gastropod mollusk in the family Trochidae, the top snails.

== Description ==
The height of the shell attains 5.2 mm, its diameter 5.6 mm. The solid shell has a depressed conoidal shape. It has a false umbilicus. The small protoconch contains 1½ flattened turns, smooth at the origin, and gradually developing four spiral lirae which become granulose cinguli on the adult whorls.

The 4 adult whorls are very slightly convex, bearing four cinguli, three of approximately equal size, the fourth immediately above the suture being more strongly developed and producing a distinct carination in the body whorl. The suture is deeply canaliculate. The cinguli are granulose.

The interstices are axially lirate, three lirae corresponding generally to two granules on the cinguli. The periphery is roundly carinate. The convex base contains nine fine granulose cinguli with axially lirate interstices. The obliqua aperture is tetragonal. The outer lip is thick, with two rows of denticles, the outer corresponding to the cinguli, the inner about six in number. The oblique columella is reflexed, with a bifid tooth at the lower edge. The umbilical cavity is deep, narrow and dentate.

== Distribution ==
This marine species occurs off the coast of South Australia.
