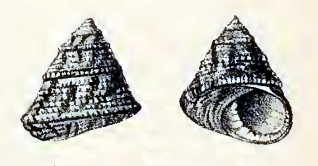
- Drawing showing two views of a shell of Clanculus scabrosus

Scientific classification
- Kingdom: Animalia
- Phylum: Mollusca
- Class: Gastropoda
- Subclass: Vetigastropoda
- Order: Trochida
- Superfamily: Trochoidea
- Family: Trochidae
- Genus: Clanculus
- Species: C. scabrosus

Binomial name
- Clanculus scabrosus (Philippi, 1850)

Synonyms
- Trochus (Belangeria) scabrosus Philippi, 1850; Trochus scabrosus Philippi, 1850

= Clanculus scabrosus =

Species of gastropod

Clanculus scabrosus is a species of sea snail, a marine gastropod mollusk in the family Trochidae, the top snails.

== Description ==
The height of the shell varies between15 mm and 17 mm; its diameter between 14 mm and 16 mm. The thick, solid shell has a false-umbilicate shape. The outlines of the spire are nearly straight. The 6 to 7 whorls are planulate, the last often constricted. They are carinate at the periphery. The color of the shell is whitish, longitudinally flammulated with brown. The base of the shell is radiately marked with narrow brown stripes, often broken into tessellations. The sculpture of the shell consists of about four spiral cinguli, of which the middle two are granulose. The upper and lower are wider, smooth or obsoletely granose. The base is convex, with 6 or 7 concentric narrow feebly granose lirae. The interstices are minutely concentrically striate. The oblique aperture is rounded rhomboidal. The outer lip is lirate within. The columella and basal lips are thickened and denticulate. The columella is folded above. The umbilical area is white. The false umbilicus is very narrow, with a spiral sulcus and fold within.

== Distribution ==
This marine species occurs off India and Sri Lanka.
