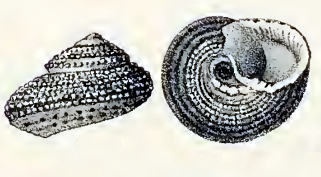
- Drawing showing two views of a shell of Clanculus plebejus

Scientific classification
- Kingdom: Animalia
- Phylum: Mollusca
- Class: Gastropoda
- Subclass: Vetigastropoda
- Order: Trochida
- Superfamily: Trochoidea
- Family: Trochidae
- Genus: Clanculus
- Species: C. plebejus

Binomial name
- Clanculus plebejus (Philippi, 1852)

Synonyms
- Clanculus (Mesoclanculus) plebejus (Philippi, 1852); Clanculus angeli Tenison-Woods, 1877; Clanculus dominicanus Tenison-Woods, 1877; Clanculus nodiliratus A. Adams, 1853; Clanculus plabeius Pritchard & Gatliff, 1902 (misspelling); Gibbula multicarinatus Tenison-Woods, 1877; Mesoclanculus plebejus Iredale, T. & McMichael, D.F. 1962; Trochus plebejus Philippi, 1852 (original description)

= Clanculus plebejus =

Species of gastropod

Clanculus plebejus, common name the plebeian clanculus, is a species of sea snail, a marine gastropod mollusk in the family Trochidae, the top snails.

== Description ==
The size of the shell varies between 6 mm and 11 mm. The small shell is depressed and umbilicate. It is pinkish brown, gray or yellow, the ribs articulated with dots of black and white, often forming radiating lines above, zigzag beneath, where yellow replaces pink in the ground-color. The spire is low-conic. The apex is acute. The about 5 whorls are coarsely lirate. The sutures are subcanaliculate. The body whorl is obtusely angular at the periphery. Its upper surface is encircled by 4 coarse, somewhat beaded lirae, the upper two contiguous, the third separated by wide intervals above and below it, the fourth peripheral, usually formed of two ridges close together. The interstices bear numerous fine spiral striae and sharp microscopic incremental striae. The convex base is concentrically sculptured with numerous (6 to 9) smooth striae, in the intervals between which very numerous microscopic striulae revolve. The rounded aperture is oblique. The outer and basal margins are thickened and very minutely crenulated within. The columella is oblique and not tortuous above, nor entering the umbilicus, but inserted upon its side. The front edge is nearly straight, denticulate at the base. The wide umbilicus is not very deep, its margin somewhat denticulate.

== Distribution ==
This marine species is endemic to Australia and occurs off New South Wales, South Australia, Tasmania, Victoria and Western Australia
