= Clanculus jucundus =

Scientific classification
- Kingdom: Animalia
- Phylum: Mollusca
- Class: Gastropoda
- Subclass: Vetigastropoda
- Order: Trochida
- Superfamily: Trochoidea
- Family: Trochidae
- Genus: Clanculus
- Species: C. jucundus

Binomial name
- Clanculus jucundus Gould, 1861

Species of gastropod

Clanculus jucundus is a species of sea snail, a marine gastropod mollusk in the family Trochidae, the top snails.

== Description ==
The height of the shell attains 5 mm, its diameter also 5 mm. The small, depressed shell has an ovate-conical shape. It has an ocher or rufous color. The five convex whorls are tessellated near the channeled suture. The base of the shell is rounded. The umbilicus has a crenulate margin. The columella has an acute, prominent denticle. The inner lip is grooved.

== Distribution ==
This marine species was discovered off Sydney, New South Wales.
