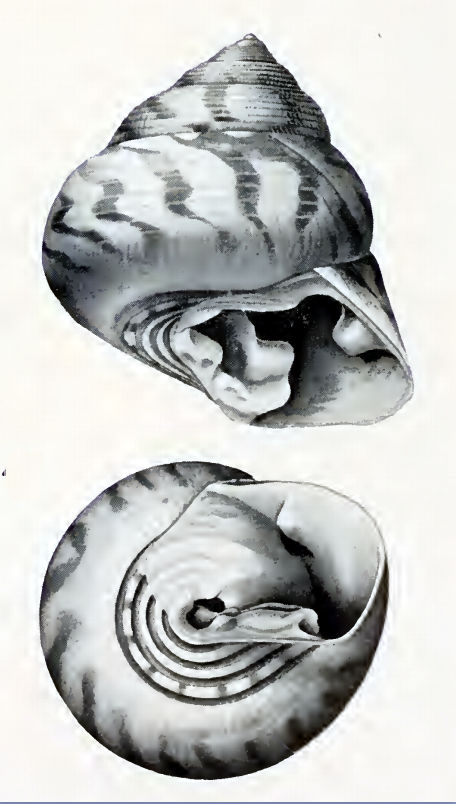
- Original drawing showing two views of a shell of Clanculus granti

Scientific classification
- Kingdom: Animalia
- Phylum: Mollusca
- Class: Gastropoda
- Subclass: Vetigastropoda
- Order: Trochida
- Superfamily: Trochoidea
- Family: Trochidae
- Genus: Clanculus
- Species: C. granti

Binomial name
- Clanculus granti Hedley, 1907

= Clanculus granti =

Species of gastropod

Clanculus granti is a species of sea snail, a marine gastropod mollusk in the family Trochidae, the top snails.

== Description ==
The height of the shell attains 10 mm. The solid, umbilicate shell has a conical shape and is pointed at the apex, slightly angled on the shoulder, rounded at the periphery and flattened on the base. It contains seven whorls. The colour, on the last three whorls, consists of oblique and zigzag brick-red stripes extending from suture to the periphery Between these as well as on the apex and base, the shell is pale cream.

Sculpture: the third, fourth and fifth whorls carry distinct spiral grooves latticed by oblique threads, which do not cross the intervening ridges. On the latter whorls this sculpture gradually fades away, leaving the body whorl smooth and polished. Around the axis on the base run four profound spiral grooves, the outer deepest, separated by smooth, prominent, narrow cords. The narrow umbilicus is bounded by a tuberculate rib, within which it is excavate, and spirally ascends the full height of the shell's interior. The aperture is very oblique and rhomboidal. The outer lip is sharp, bevelled within and carrying a strong deep-seated tubercle. The parietal callus is coarsely wrinkled. The columella spirally ascends the umbilicus, terminating anteriorly in a massive bifid tooth, and higher up supporting a small tubercle.

== Distribution ==
This marine species occurs off the Philippines, Fiji, Tonga and Australia (Queensland)
