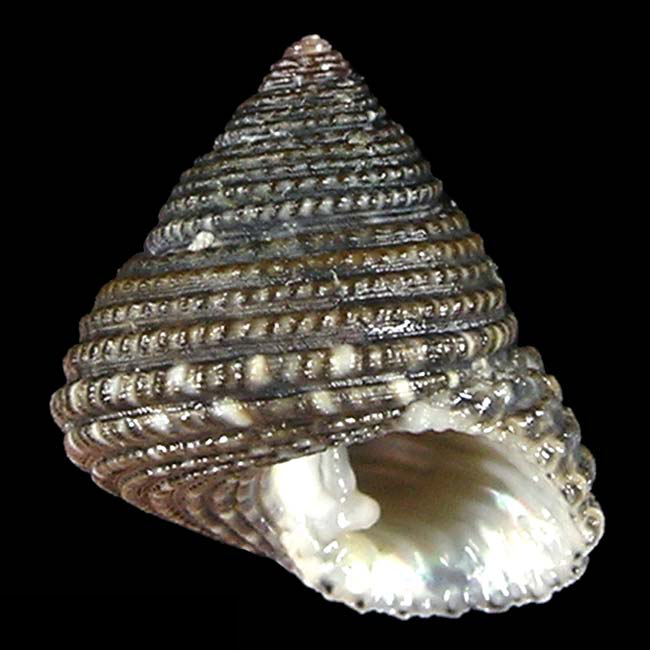

Scientific classification
- Kingdom: Animalia
- Phylum: Mollusca
- Class: Gastropoda
- Subclass: Vetigastropoda
- Order: Trochida
- Superfamily: Trochoidea
- Family: Trochidae
- Genus: Clanculus
- Species: C. escondidus

Binomial name
- Clanculus escondidus Poppe, Tagaro & Vilvens, 2009

= Clanculus escondidus =

Species of gastropod

Clanculus escondidus is a species of sea snail, a marine gastropod mollusk in the family Trochidae, the top snails.

== Description ==
The height of the shell attains 8 mm.

== Distribution ==
This marine species occurs off the Philippines.
