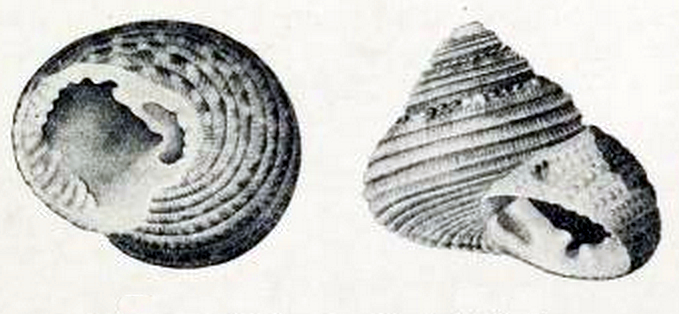
- Original drawing showing two views of a shell of Clanculus johnstoni

Scientific classification
- Kingdom: Animalia
- Phylum: Mollusca
- Class: Gastropoda
- Subclass: Vetigastropoda
- Order: Trochida
- Superfamily: Trochoidea
- Family: Trochidae
- Genus: Clanculus
- Species: C. johnstoni

Binomial name
- Clanculus johnstoni Hedley, 1917

= Clanculus johnstoni =

Species of gastropod

Clanculus johnstoni is a species of sea snail, a marine gastropod mollusk in the family Trochidae, the top snails.

== Description ==
The height of the shell attains 6 millimetres (0.24 in), its major diameter also 6 mm (0.24 in). The small, solid shell has a globose-conic shape. It has a carmine colour with radial buff dashes, about eight to a whorl, reaching from the suture half-way to the periphery. The umbilicus and the bordering funicle is white. As in allied forms, there is a colour dimorphism in which olive brown replaces the carmine, a trace of which remains on the summit. The shell contains five whorls. On the penultimate whorl there are four spirals, the upper being a double bead row, and a fifth half-buried in the suture by the succeeding whorl. On the body whorl there are thirteen spirals which become taller, broader, more widely spaced and more inclined to break up into beads as they ascend from base to suture. The oblique aperture is finally ascending. Within the outer lip are about a dozen entering ridges, the lowest larger than the rest. The oblique columella is twisted, the edge reflected, with a large tooth at the base and a small one above. The umbilical margin broadly overreaches the cavity, its edge with three or four denticules. A translucent callus unites the lips.

== Distribution ==
This marine species is endemic to Australia and occurs at intertidal depths off the Northern Territory and Queensland
