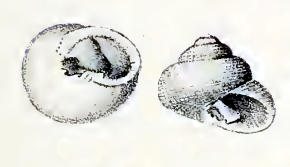
- Drawing with two views of a shell of Clanculus albanyensis

Scientific classification
- Kingdom: Animalia
- Phylum: Mollusca
- Class: Gastropoda
- Subclass: Vetigastropoda
- Order: Trochida
- Superfamily: Trochoidea
- Family: Trochidae
- Genus: Clanculus
- Species: C. albanyensis

Binomial name
- Clanculus albanyensis Jansen, 1995

Synonyms
- Clanculus (Mesoclanculus) ochroleucus (Philippi, 1849); Trochus ochroleucus Philippi, 1849

= Clanculus albanyensis =

Species of gastropod

Clanculus albanyensis, common name the yellow top shell, is a species of sea snail, a marine gastropod mollusk in the family Trochidae, the top snails.

== Description ==
The height of the shell attains 12 mm. The umbilicate shell has a conoidal shape. It is isabella-colored and sculptured with very fine spiral lirae, about 11 on the penultimate whorl, 40 on the last whorl. They are on the upper whorls distinctly granulose, on the last almost entirely smooth. The 6 to 7 whorls are rather rounded with a convex base, the last one is scarcely angled. The margin of the narrow umbilicus is dentate. The columella is very oblique, not solute above and terminates below in a simple, small denticle. The outer lip is thickened within with five folds but near the edge with numerous wrinkles.

== Distribution ==
This marine species is endemic to Australia and occurs off South Australia, Tasmania, Victoria and Western Australia.
