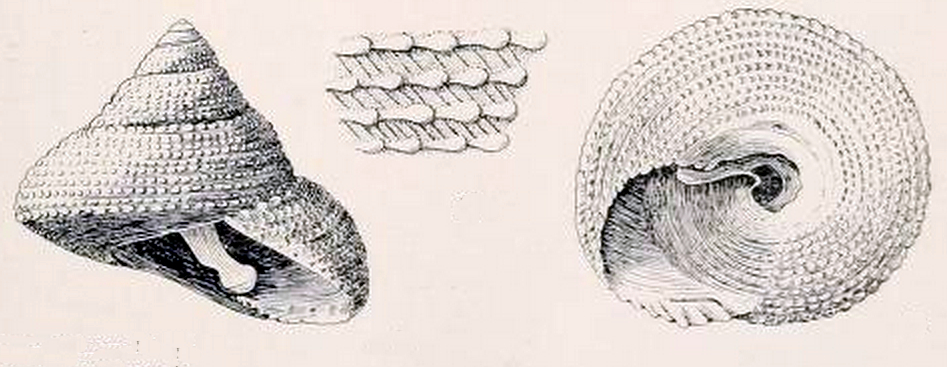
- Original drawing of the shell of Clanculus leucomphalus

Scientific classification
- Kingdom: Animalia
- Phylum: Mollusca
- Class: Gastropoda
- Subclass: Vetigastropoda
- Order: Trochida
- Superfamily: Trochoidea
- Family: Trochidae
- Genus: Clanculus
- Species: C. leucomphalus

Binomial name
- Clanculus leucomphalus Verco, 1905

Synonyms
- Clanculus (Euclanculus) leucomphalus Verco, 1905

= Clanculus leucomphalus =

Species of gastropod

Clanculus leucomphalus is a species of sea snail, a marine gastropod mollusk in the family Trochidae, the top snails.

== Description ==
(Original description by Joseph Verco) The size of the shell varies between 10 mm and 14 mm. The rather thin shell has a depressed conic shape. The smooth protoconch consists of 1½ whorl. The shell contains 6 sloping convex whorls that increase in size rapidly. The penultimate whorl contains 8 close-set spiral rows of smooth ovate granules. The body whorl has ten spiral rows of granules above the acutely angled periphery. The granules of the infrasutural row are much larger and placed axially, the rest spirally ovate. The ten rows on the base have flatter, more quadrate, and more close-set granules. Oblique axial striae crowd between the granules on the spire, but are obsolete on the base.

The aperture is quadrate oblique. The outer lip is crenulate, toothed just within the margin opposite each spiral lira, within this thickened and wrinkled, and in the throat lirate and nacreous. The basal lip is crenulate, thickened within with 5 teeth gradually enlarging towards the columella. The columella is oblique, nearly straight, ending below in a prominent, obliquely furrowed but not bifid tooth, with a large tubercle at the junction of its upper and middle third, and with a flange throughout its whole length bent towards the umbilicus. The umbilicus is wide and deep, with a funicle winding up its outer side to the tubercle on the columella. The umbilical border overhangs, and has 6 medium-sized tubercles, and is margined by a flat, axially incised, spiral lira, with a threadlet on either side.

The colour of the shell is light ashen-grey, with obscure flames of deeper grey or buff, and with numerous small pink dots on the second and third whorls. The umbilicus and its margin are pure white, the aperture nacreous green.

== Distribution ==
This marine species is endemic to Australia and occurs off South Australia, Tasmania, Victoria and Western Australia.
