= Clanculus multipunctatus =

Scientific classification
- Kingdom: Animalia
- Phylum: Mollusca
- Class: Gastropoda
- Subclass: Vetigastropoda
- Order: Trochida
- Superfamily: Trochoidea
- Family: Trochidae
- Genus: Clanculus
- Species: C. multipunctatus

Binomial name
- Clanculus multipunctatus Jansen, 1995

Synonyms
- Clanculus margaritarius multipunctatus Jansen, 1995

Species of gastropod

Clanculus multipunctatuscommon name the beautiful clanculus, is a species of sea snail, a marine gastropod mollusk in the family Trochidae, the top snails.

== Description ==
The size of the shell varies between 10 mm and 17 mm.

== Distribution ==
This marine species occurs off the Philippines and Australia (Western Australia and the Northern Territories).
