= Clanculus laurae =

Scientific classification
- Kingdom: Animalia
- Phylum: Mollusca
- Class: Gastropoda
- Subclass: Vetigastropoda
- Order: Trochida
- Superfamily: Trochoidea
- Family: Trochidae
- Genus: Clanculus
- Species: C. laurae

Binomial name
- Clanculus laurae Cecalupo, Buzzurro & Mariani, 2008

Species of gastropod

Clanculus laurae is a species of sea snail, a marine gastropod mollusk in the family Trochidae, the top snails.

== Distribution ==
This species occurs in the Mediterranean Sea off Tunisia.
