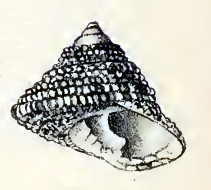
- Drawing showing a shell of Clanculus philippii

Scientific classification
- Kingdom: Animalia
- Phylum: Mollusca
- Class: Gastropoda
- Subclass: Vetigastropoda
- Order: Trochida
- Superfamily: Trochoidea
- Family: Trochidae
- Genus: Clanculus
- Species: C. philippii

Binomial name
- Clanculus philippii (Koch in Philippi, 1843)

Synonyms
- Clanculus conspersus A. Adams, 1853; Clanculus philomenae Tenison-Woods, 1876; Clanculus purpuratus Pilsbry, 1889; Clanculus raphaeli Tenison-Woods, 1877; Clanculus yatesi Crosse, 1863; Clanculus (Isoclanculus) philippii (Koch in Philippi, 1843); Clanculus (Isoclanculus) yatesi Crosse, H., 1863; Isoclanculus menkei A. Adams & Angas, 18??; Trochus philippi Koch in Philippi, 1843 (original description); Trochus yatesi Fischer, 1879

= Clanculus philippii =

Species of gastropod

Clanculus philippii, common name Philippi's cone, is a species of sea snail, a marine gastropod mollusk in the family Trochidae, the top snails.

== Description ==
The size of the shell varies between 7 mm and 13 mm. The very solid shell has a conical shape and is angulate at the periphery, with a very shallow umbilicus. It is white, variegated with maculations and radiating zigzag stripes of purplish red. The five whorls are planulate and turgid below the subcanaliculate sutures. The apical ones, when not eroded, are spirally striate, the following granose-lirate, the last bearing on its upper surface five coarse beaded lirae, the fifth forming the periphery. The base of the shell is slightly convex, bearing six beaded lirae. The interstices between the lirae are finely obliquely striate. The aperture is rounded-tetragonal, pearly within. The outer lip is lirate within. The basal lip is curved and subdenticulate. The short columella is hardly perceptibly folded above and dentate below. The umbilicus perforates scarcely deeper than the insertion of the straight columella.

== Distribution ==
This marine species is endemic to Australia and occurs off South Australia, Tasmania, Victoria and Western Australia.
