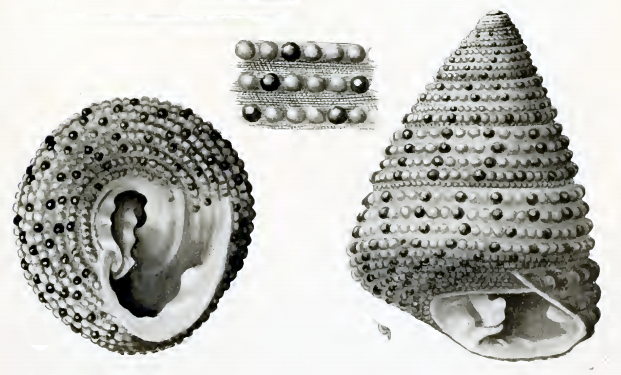
- Image showing two views of a shell of Clanculus comarilis

Scientific classification
- Kingdom: Animalia
- Phylum: Mollusca
- Class: Gastropoda
- Subclass: Vetigastropoda
- Order: Trochida
- Superfamily: Trochoidea
- Family: Trochidae
- Genus: Clanculus
- Species: C. comarilis

Binomial name
- Clanculus comarilis Hedley, 1912

= Clanculus comarilis =

Species of gastropod

Clanculus comarilis is a species of sea snail, a marine gastropod mollusk in the family Trochidae, the top snails.

== Description ==
(Original description by Charles Hedley) The size of the shell attains 15 mm. The solid shell has a conical shape. The seven whorls are parted by impressed sutures. Its colour is white, clouded with pale brown, every third or fourth bead in every row picked out with dark madder-brown, giving a general effect of irregular dark radial stripes on a pale ground. The apex is articulated with crimson. The sculpture of the shell shows on the upper whorls four gemmule rows, and part of a fifth is visible along the suture. The body whorl has twelve rows, of which seven are on the base. The gemmules are prominent, glossy, about fifty to a whorl, their breadth apart from row to row, but closer within the row. The anterior row of each whorl has larger and more crowded gemmules. The interstices between the rows are microscopically reticulated by spiral and oblique striae. The aperture descends two gemmule rows. Within the base are four entering plications, otherwise the armature agrees with that of Clanculus margaritarius (Philippi, 1846) and related forms.

== Distribution ==
This marine species occurs off Indonesia and Australia (Northern Territory, Queensland, Western Australia).
