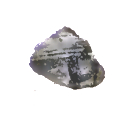
- Original drawing of a shell of Clanculus atypicus

Scientific classification
- Kingdom: Animalia
- Phylum: Mollusca
- Class: Gastropoda
- Subclass: Vetigastropoda
- Order: Trochida
- Superfamily: Trochoidea
- Family: Trochidae
- Genus: Clanculus
- Species: C. atypicus

Binomial name
- Clanculus atypicus Iredale, 1912

Synonyms
- Clanculus (Clanculopsis) atypicus Iredale, 1912

= Clanculus atypicus =

Species of gastropod

Clanculus atypicus is a species of sea snail, a marine gastropod mollusk in the family Trochidae, the top snails.

== Description ==
(Original description by Tom Iredale) The small, solid, umbilicate shell has a depressedly globose shape with six whorls. Its periphery is rounded, and its base flattened. The colour of the shell is dark greyish-brown, painted obliquely with yellow or fawn. Its sculpture consists of fine spiral threads of varying strengths, about eighteen major ones on the body whorl. The preceding whorl shows six major threads only. The axial sculpture is represented by very fine close lines. The suture is deep, channelled, bounded by a row of nodules. The oblique aperture is subquadrate. The outer lip is slightly crenulate and recurved. The deep umbilicus is surrounded by a noduled callused rim, the callus extending to meet the outer lip. The columella is obliquely inserted in the umbilicus, with a small nodule at each end. The operculum is circular, horny, thin, multispiral, with a central nucleus.

== Distribution ==
This marine species is endemic to New Zealand, occurring off the Kermadec Islands.
