= Clanculus quadricingulatus =

Scientific classification
- Kingdom: Animalia
- Phylum: Mollusca
- Class: Gastropoda
- Subclass: Vetigastropoda
- Order: Trochida
- Superfamily: Trochoidea
- Family: Trochidae
- Genus: Clanculus
- Species: C. quadricingulatus

Binomial name
- Clanculus quadricingulatus Ludbrook N.H., 1941

Species of gastropod

Clanculus quadricingulatus is a species of sea snail, a marine gastropod mollusk in the family Trochidae, the top snails.

== Description ==
Clanculus quadricingulatus is characterized by:

- Small, globose-conical shell (8-12 mm height) with 5-6 convex whorls
- Distinctive spiral pattern of four dark bands on a cream to pinkish background
- Umbilicate aperture with denticulate margins
- Thick, pearly operculum
- Radula formula: ∞·5·1·5·∞

== Distribution ==
This marine species is endemic to South Australia.
