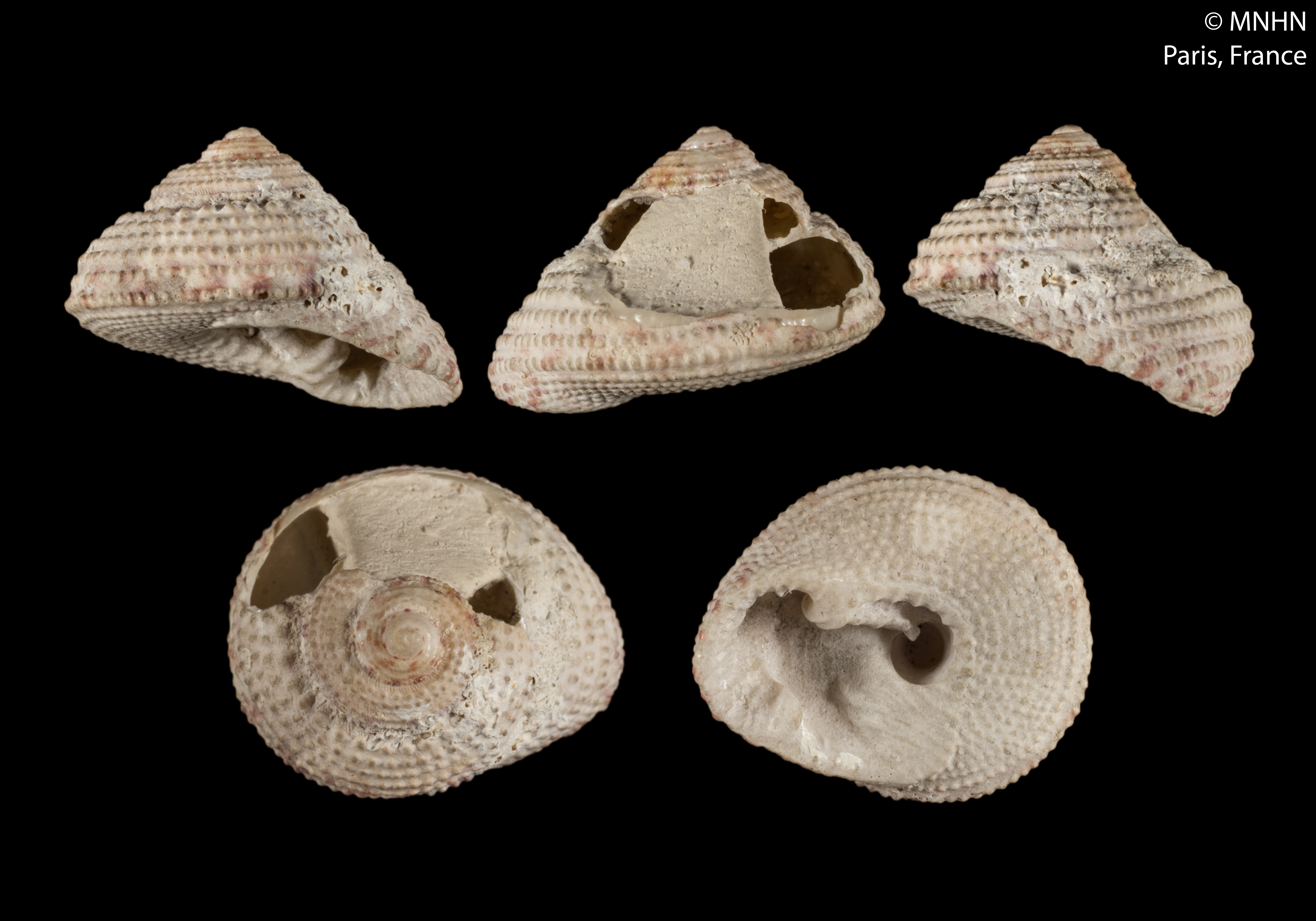
- Shell of Clanculus limbatus (syntype at MNHN, Paris)

Scientific classification
- Kingdom: Animalia
- Phylum: Mollusca
- Class: Gastropoda
- Subclass: Vetigastropoda
- Order: Trochida
- Superfamily: Trochoidea
- Family: Trochidae
- Genus: Clanculus
- Species: C. limbatus

Binomial name
- Clanculus limbatus (Quoy & Gaimard, 1834)

Synonyms
- Clanculus maculosus A. Adams, 1853; Clanculus variegatus A. Adams, 1853; Trochus limbatus Quoy & Gaimard, 1834 (original description); Trochus morum Philippi, 1848

= Clanculus limbatus =

Species of gastropod

Clanculus limbatus, common name the keeled clanculus, is a species of sea snail, a marine gastropod mollusk in the family Trochidae, the top snails.

== Description ==
The size of the shell varies between 13 mm and 20 mm. The depressed, umbilicate shell has a conoidal shape. It is carinate at its periphery. Its color is whitish or yellowish, maculated with brown, generally with a series of blotches at the periphery and beneath the suture, the intervening space unicolored or more or less tessellated. The base of the shell is tessellated or radiately flamed. The spire is low conical with an acute, smooth apex. The 5 to 6 whorls are convex just below the sutures, then flattened, and at the periphery carinated. The sutures are subcanaliculate. The body whorl scarcely descends anteriorly, above with 6 to 8 spiral closely granose cinguli, beneath with 7 to 9 similar concentric cinguli. The interstices both above and below are closely, sharply, obliquely, and microscopically striate. The base of the shell is slightly convex. The oblique aperture is tetragonal. The outer lip is four or five-lirate within, the upper fold somewhat enlarged and subdentiform. The basal margin and marginal rib of the umbilicus are finely plicate. The columella is oblique, nearly straight, its edge reflexed and plicate-dentate, terminating below in a small square denticle, inserted above upon the side of the umbilicus. The umbilicus is rather wide and funnel-shaped.

== Distribution ==
This marine species is endemic to Australia and occurs off South Australia, Tasmania, Victoria and Western Australia.
