= Clanculus mariaemaris =

Scientific classification
- Kingdom: Animalia
- Phylum: Mollusca
- Class: Gastropoda
- Subclass: Vetigastropoda
- Order: Trochida
- Superfamily: Trochoidea
- Family: Trochidae
- Genus: Clanculus
- Species: C. mariaemaris

Binomial name
- Clanculus mariaemaris Rubio & Rolan, 2002

Species of gastropod

Clanculus mariaemaris is a species of sea snail, a marine gastropod mollusk in the family Trochidae, the top snails.

== Description ==
The length of the shell attains 5 mm.

== Distribution ==
This species occurs in the Atlantic Ocean off São Tomé and Príncipe.
