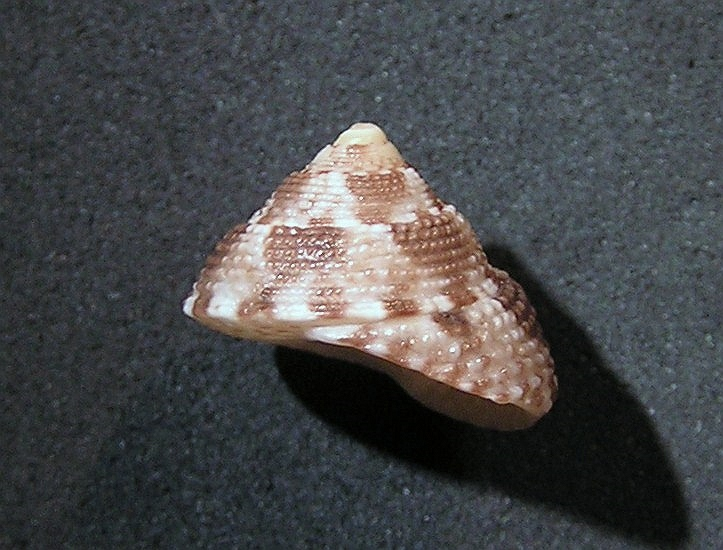

Scientific classification
- Kingdom: Animalia
- Phylum: Mollusca
- Class: Gastropoda
- Subclass: Vetigastropoda
- Order: Trochida
- Superfamily: Trochoidea
- Family: Trochidae
- Genus: Clanculus
- Species: C. brunneus

Binomial name
- Clanculus brunneus A. Adams, 1853

Synonyms
- Clanculus omalomphalus A. Adams, 1853; Clanculus zebrides A. Adams, 1853; Isoclanculus brunneus Iredale, T. & McMichael, D.F. 1962

= Clanculus brunneus =

Species of gastropod

Clanculus brunneus is a species of sea snail, a marine gastropod mollusk in the family Trochidae, the top snails.

== Description ==
The size of the shell varies between 13 mm and 15 mm. The shell has a depressed-conic shape. It is dark brown, adorned with colored bands with granules. The interstices are longitudinally elevated. The whorls are flat, the last one is sharply angulate. The umbilicus has a flat margin. The columella is transversely oblique with a tasseled margin. It terminates in a biplicate tooth. The inner lip shows fine linear elevations, with the last lira the largest.

== Distribution ==
This marine species is endemic to Australia and occurs off New South Wales.
