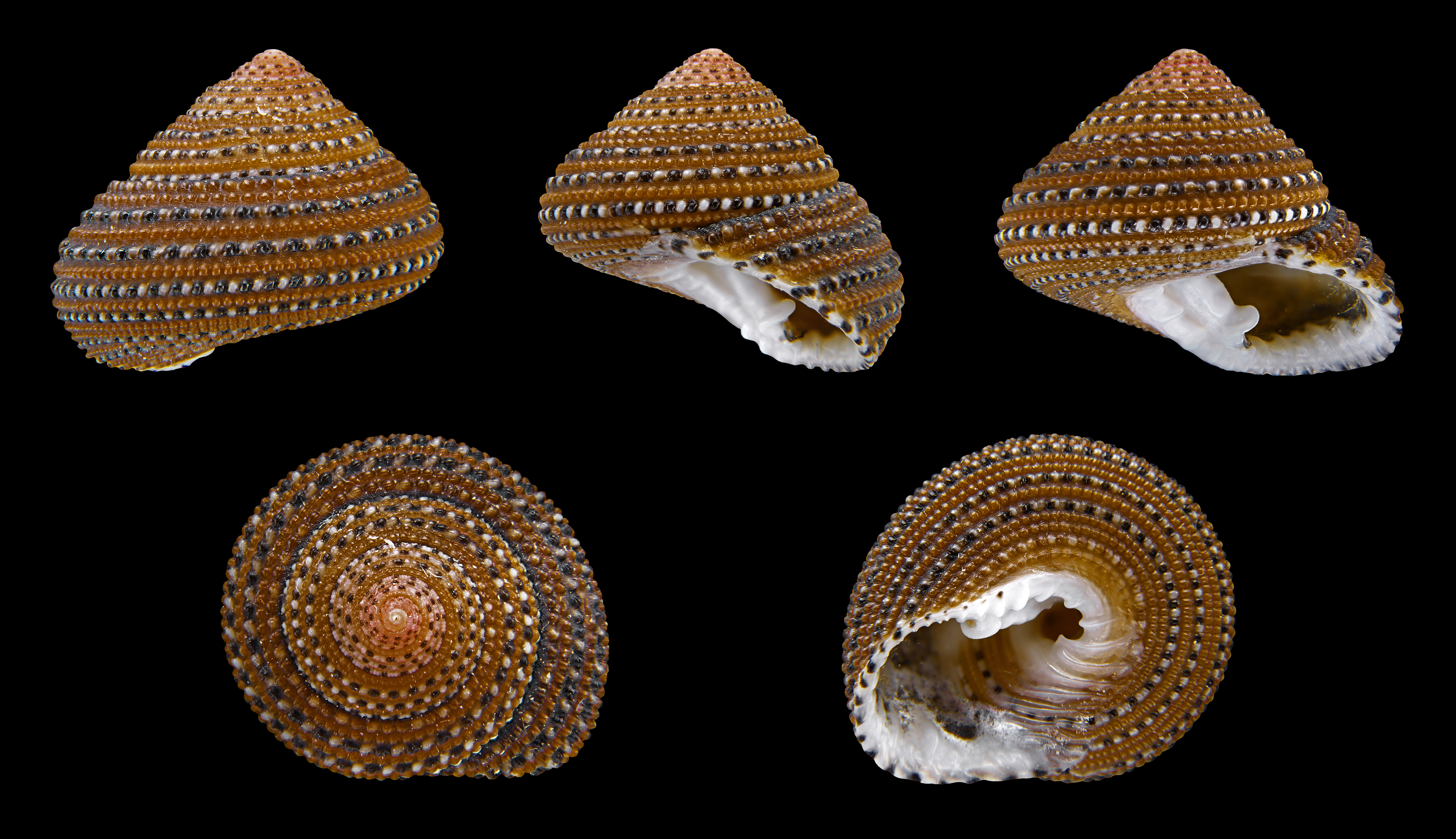
- Five views of a 1.7 cm shell of Clanculus ormophorus from Masqat, Oman

Scientific classification
- Kingdom: Animalia
- Phylum: Mollusca
- Class: Gastropoda
- Subclass: Vetigastropoda
- Order: Trochida
- Superfamily: Trochoidea
- Family: Trochidae
- Genus: Clanculus
- Species: C. ormophorus

Binomial name
- Clanculus ormophorus A. Adams, 1853

= Clanculus ormophorus =

Species of gastropod

Clanculus ormophorus is a species of medium-sized sea snail, a marine gastropod mollusc in the family Trochidae, the top snails.

This name applies to a species which is incertae sedis; the name may be a synonym of another species.

== Description ==
The size of the shell attains 18 mm. The umbilical shell has a depressed-conical shape with rounded whorls. The cinguli are granulated in an equal manner. The first, second and third cinguli contain cinguli with dark granules alternated with white. The fourth contains brown granules. The penultimate whorl is crooked. The body whorl is rounded. The umbilicus is crenulated. The columella is callous, subreflexed and with a triplicate tooth at its base.

== Distribution ==
This marine species occurs in the Persian Gulf.
