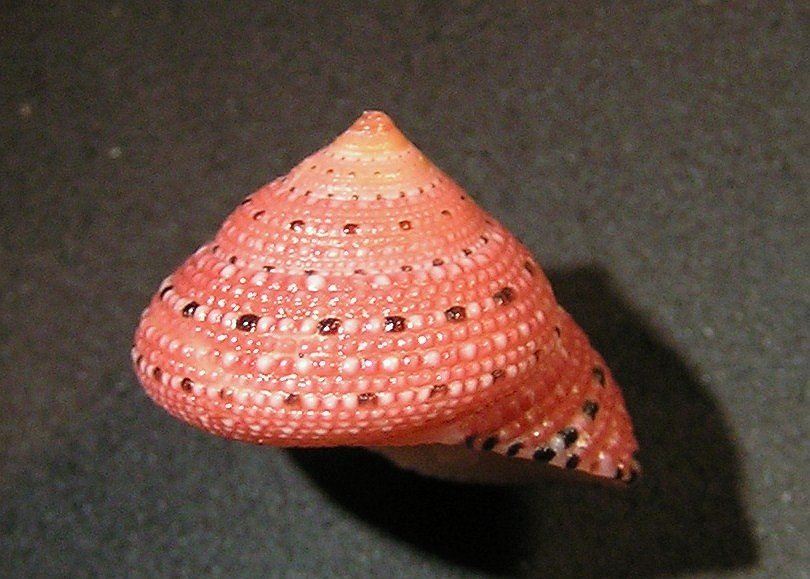

Scientific classification
- Kingdom: Animalia
- Phylum: Mollusca
- Class: Gastropoda
- Subclass: Vetigastropoda
- Order: Trochida
- Family: Trochidae
- Genus: Clanculus
- Species: C. buijsei

Binomial name
- Clanculus buijsei Poppe, Tagaro & Dekker, 2006

= Clanculus buijsei =

Species of gastropod

Clanculus buijsei is a species of sea snail, a marine gastropod mollusk in the family Trochidae, the top snails.

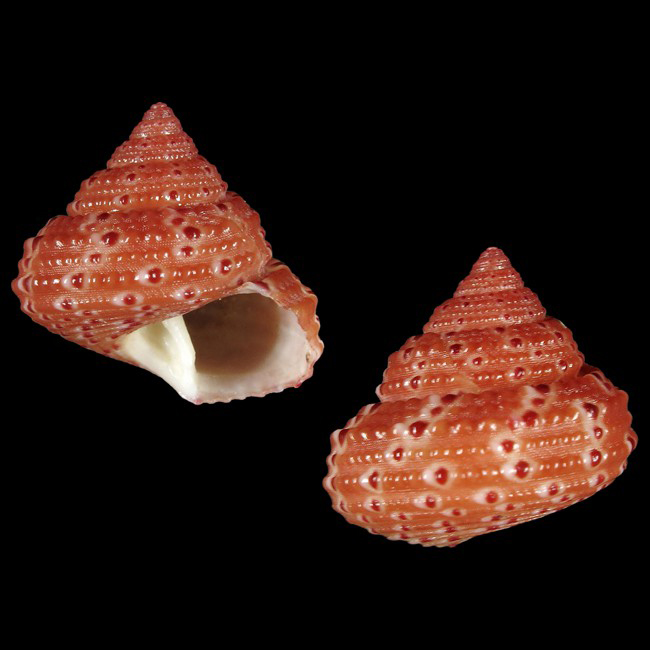
Seashell Clanculus buijsei

== Description ==
The length of an adult shell attains 11 mm.

== Distribution ==
This species occurs in the Pacific Ocean off the Philippines.
