= Clanculus denticulatus =

Scientific classification
- Kingdom: Animalia
- Phylum: Mollusca
- Class: Gastropoda
- Subclass: Vetigastropoda
- Order: Trochida
- Superfamily: Trochoidea
- Family: Trochidae
- Genus: Clanculus
- Species: C. denticulatus

Binomial name
- Clanculus denticulatus (Gray, 1827)

Synonyms
- Monodonta denticulata Gray, 1827; Monodonta lupina Menke, K.T., 1843; Trochus samoensis Rousseau in Hombron, J.B. & C.H. Jacquinot, 1877

Species of gastropod

Clanculus denticulatus, common name the toothed clanculus, is a species of sea snail, a marine gastropod mollusk in the family Trochidae, the top snails.

== Description ==
The size of the shell varies between 7 mm and 13 mm. The depressed, spirally grooved shell has a conical shape. It is pale reddish, ornamented with rows of white and brown spots. The; ribs are slightly granulated. The sutures are distinct and impressed. The lower part of the body whorl is nearly smooth. The white umbilicus is smooth inside, the edge furnished with a series of granules. The aperture is subquadrangular. The outer lip is crenulated at the edge. The columellar lip is smooth, with a large tooth at the inside and a little roughness on the outer side.

== Distribution ==
This marine species occurs off Japan, the Philippines and Australia
