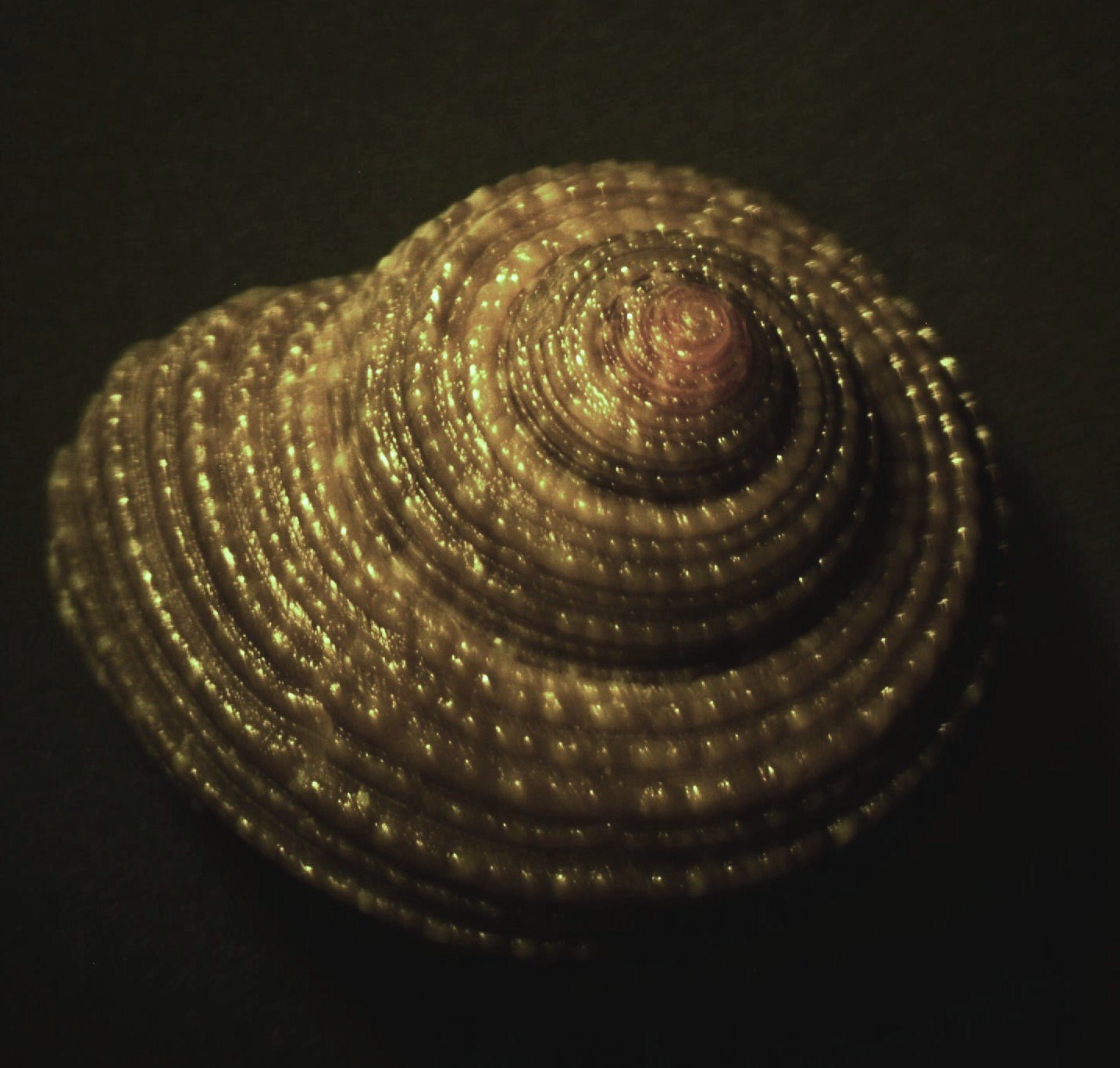
- View of a shell of Clanculus scotti

Scientific classification
- Kingdom: Animalia
- Phylum: Mollusca
- Class: Gastropoda
- Subclass: Vetigastropoda
- Order: Trochida
- Superfamily: Trochoidea
- Family: Trochidae
- Genus: Clanculus
- Species: C. scotti

Binomial name
- Clanculus scotti Poppe, Tagaro & Dekker, 2006

= Clanculus scotti =

Species of gastropod

Clanculus scotti is a species of sea snail, a marine gastropod mollusk in the family Trochidae, the top snails.

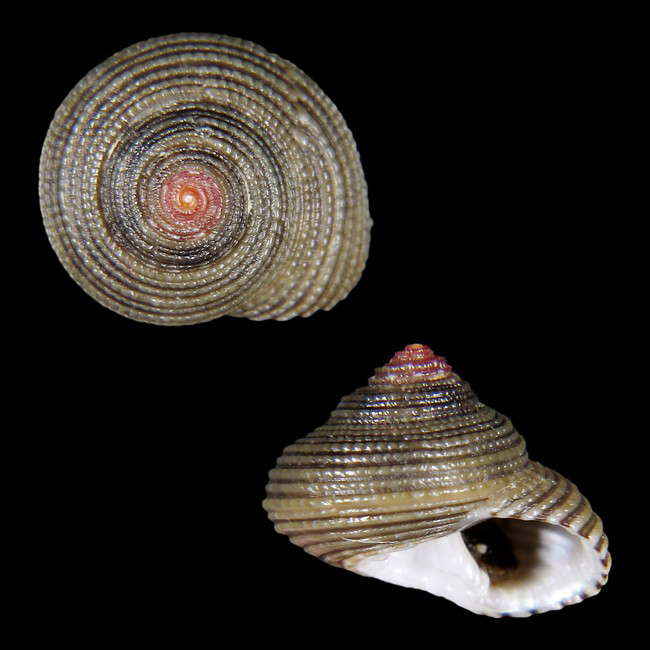
Seashell Clanculus scotti

== Description ==
The size of the shell varies between 8.5 mm and 14 mm.

== Distribution ==
This marine species occurs off the Philippines.
