= Clanculus cristinae =

Scientific classification
- Kingdom: Animalia
- Phylum: Mollusca
- Class: Gastropoda
- Subclass: Vetigastropoda
- Order: Trochida
- Superfamily: Trochoidea
- Family: Trochidae
- Genus: Clanculus
- Species: C. cristinae

Binomial name
- Clanculus cristinae Rubio & Rolan, 2002

Species of gastropod

Clanculus cristinae is a species of sea snail, a marine gastropod mollusk in the family Trochidae, the top snails.

== Distribution ==
This species occurs in the Atlantic Ocean off West Africa.
