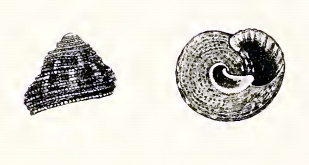
- Original drawing showing two views of a shell of Clanculus euchelioides

Scientific classification
- Kingdom: Animalia
- Phylum: Mollusca
- Class: Gastropoda
- Subclass: Vetigastropoda
- Order: Trochida
- Superfamily: Trochoidea
- Family: Trochidae
- Genus: Clanculus
- Species: C. euchelioides

Binomial name
- Clanculus euchelioides Tate, 1893

Synonyms
- Clanculus gatliffi Tomlin, 1924; Microclanculus euchelioides Cotton B.C., 1959; Microclanculus gatliffi Cotton B.C., 1945

= Clanculus euchelioides =

Species of gastropod

Clanculus euchelioides, common name the small top shell, is a species of sea snail, a marine gastropod mollusk in the family Trochidae, the top snails.

== Description ==
(Original description by R. Tate) The size of the shell varies between 6 mm and 9 mm. The somewhat solid shell has a turbinately conchoid shape. It is opaque, concolorous (reddish). It contains about six whorls. The ordinary spire whorls are separated by a canaliculate suture and are flattened posteriorly. The body whorl is convex in the anterior-third. The base of the shell is flatly convex and falsely umbilicated. The columella enters the umbilical depression, which is shallow and moderately narrow. The aperture is oblique and rhomboidoval. The outer lip is slightly depressed at the suture. The outer and basal margins are thin, lirate, and iridescent within (the lirae not extending to the margin). The oblique columella is straight, rib-like, with an attenuated keel elevated into a tooth-like prominence at the base, and separated from the basal margin of the aperture by a deep gemmulated ribs of about equal magnitude. At the suture there is a double smaller rib, and there is a finer one posterior to the periphery. The transverse riblets of the penultimate whorl show increasing revolution of the whorls and become more slender and closer together. And thus the fenestrated ornament is somewhat obscured on the front part of the body whorl. Below the periphery there are about five revolving equal-sized ribs, more or less gemmulated at the intersections of transverse sigmoidal threads, the one margining the umbilicus most conspicuously so. The umbilical wall has about five flat threads crossed by lamella-like striae.

The conspicuous oblique ribbing and very wide umbilicus are characters which separate this species from the majority of its congeners.

== Distribution ==
This marine species is endemic to Australia and occurs off Queensland, South Australia and Western Australia.
