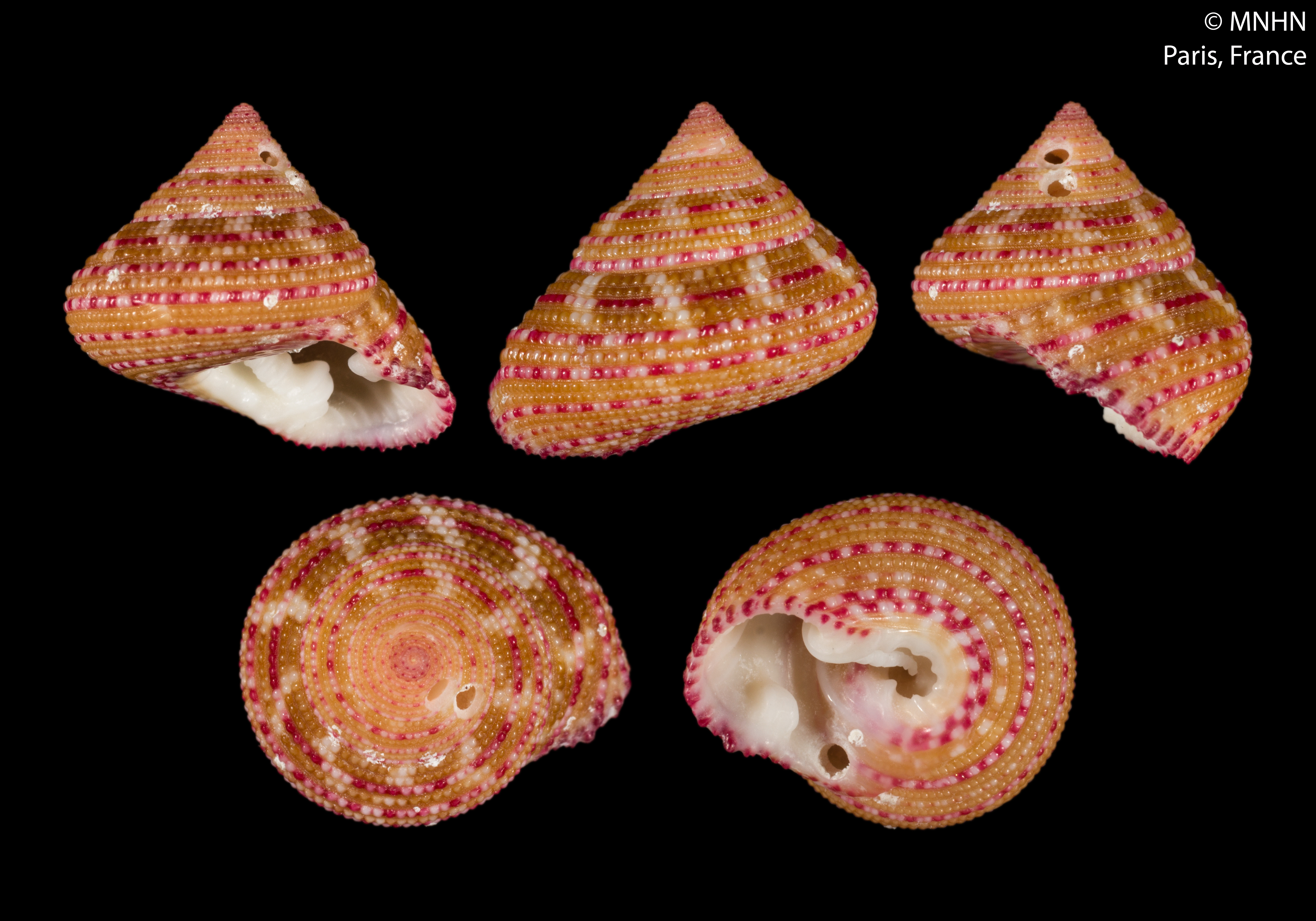
- Shell of Clanculus richeri (holotype at MNHN, Paris)

Scientific classification
- Kingdom: Animalia
- Phylum: Mollusca
- Class: Gastropoda
- Subclass: Vetigastropoda
- Order: Trochida
- Superfamily: Trochoidea
- Family: Trochidae
- Genus: Clanculus
- Species: C. richeri

Binomial name
- Clanculus richeri Vilvens, 2000

= Clanculus richeri =

Species of gastropod

Clanculus richeri is a species of sea snail, a marine gastropod mollusk in the family Trochidae, the top snails.

== Description ==
The height of the shell attains 14 mm. This species possesses distinct, thin magenta stripes with white-coloured blotches resembling dots around the outer shell.

== Distribution ==
This marine species occurs off New Caledonia and in the Coral Sea.
