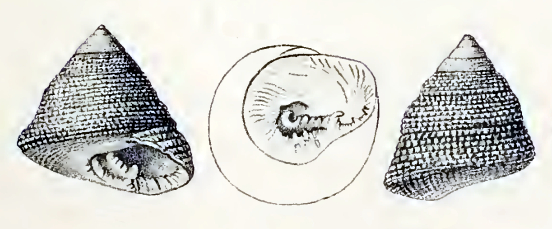
- Drawing with three views of a shell of Clanculus maugeri

Scientific classification
- Kingdom: Animalia
- Phylum: Mollusca
- Class: Gastropoda
- Subclass: Vetigastropoda
- Order: Trochida
- Superfamily: Trochoidea
- Family: Trochidae
- Genus: Clanculus
- Species: C. maugeri

Binomial name
- Clanculus maugeri (W. Wood, 1828)

Synonyms
- Macroclanculus maugeri Iredale, T. & McMichael, D.F. 1962; Trochus maugeri W. Wood, 1828 (original description)

= Clanculus maugeri =

Species of gastropod

Clanculus maugeri is a species of sea snail, a marine gastropod mollusk in the family Trochidae, the top snails.

== Description ==
The height of the shell varies between 20 mm and 26 mm, its diameter measures 25 mm. The solid, thick shell has a conical shape carinated with nearly straight sides and is false-umbilicate. This species is more strictly conical than usual in Clanculus. It has a reddish or yellowish-brown color, more or less dotted minutely with a slightly darker shade. The about 8 whorls are flat above The sutures are scarcely marked. The first whorls of the apex when not smooth by erosion are spirally lirate. These lirae are dotted with red. The succeeding whorls are very closely, finely granulate in spiral series. The fine granulation is nearly uniform. Its color is minutely dotted with darker and beneath usually with white. These are characters separating Clanculus maugeri from other species in this genus. The body whorl has about 7 rows of granules above. It is carinate at the periphery and slightly deflected anteriorly. The base of the shell is nearly flat with numerous (15 to 20) close finely beaded concentric lirulae. The tetragonal aperture is very oblique. The upper lip is straightened and wrinkled within. The outer and basal lips are thick, curved and crenulate within. The columella is very oblique. Its edge is denticulate, slightly tortuous above, and inserted in the center of the axis. Below it terminates in an acute or squarish narrow tooth. The parietal wall and the umbilicus are rugose, the latter bounded by a plicate-denticulate rib.

== Distribution ==
This marine species is endemic to Australia and occurs in the subtidal and intertidal zone off New South Wales, Tasmania and Victoria
