= Clanculus gemmulifer =

Scientific classification
- Kingdom: Animalia
- Phylum: Mollusca
- Class: Gastropoda
- Subclass: Vetigastropoda
- Order: Trochida
- Superfamily: Trochoidea
- Family: Trochidae
- Genus: Clanculus
- Species: C. gemmulifer

Binomial name
- Clanculus gemmulifer Pilsbry, 1901

Species of gastropod

Clanculus gemmulifer is a species of sea snail, a marine gastropod mollusk in the family Trochidae, the top snails.

== Description ==
The height of the shell attains 12 mm. The solid shell has a low-trochiform shape. It is angular at the periphery and slightly convex beneath. The ground color is red or dull red. The sculpture of the spiral cords cuts into smooth rounded beads. These cords are a little narrower than the intervals on the upper surface, smaller on the base and about equal in width to their intervals. Above the periphery on the body whorl there are five rows of beads, all of them dotted, either having a black interval between two white beads, or with a black and a white bead. The intervals consist of two or three red beads. The base of the shell is similarly variegated, but the dots are sometimes brown. Furrows between the bead-rows are finely and densely decussate by spiral and oblique raised striae or threads. The spire is straightly conic with an acute, roseate apex and about six whorls. The body whorl is deflexed in front. The aperture is oblique, and contracted by a simple, rather compressed fold at the foot of the columella, and another near the upper end of the outer lip with several small folds between them. The columella is contorted above and enters deeply the false umbilicus, the margin of which is toothed. The parietal callus is strongly plicate.

There is a subspecies Clanculus gemmulifer var. pallidus H. A. Pilsbry, 1903 which differs by its pale, yellowish-brown tint and some indistinct, paler, radial flames. Only a few of the lirae have sparse, black beads, each between two white ones.

== Distribution ==
This marine species occurs in the Indo-Pacific and off Japan.
