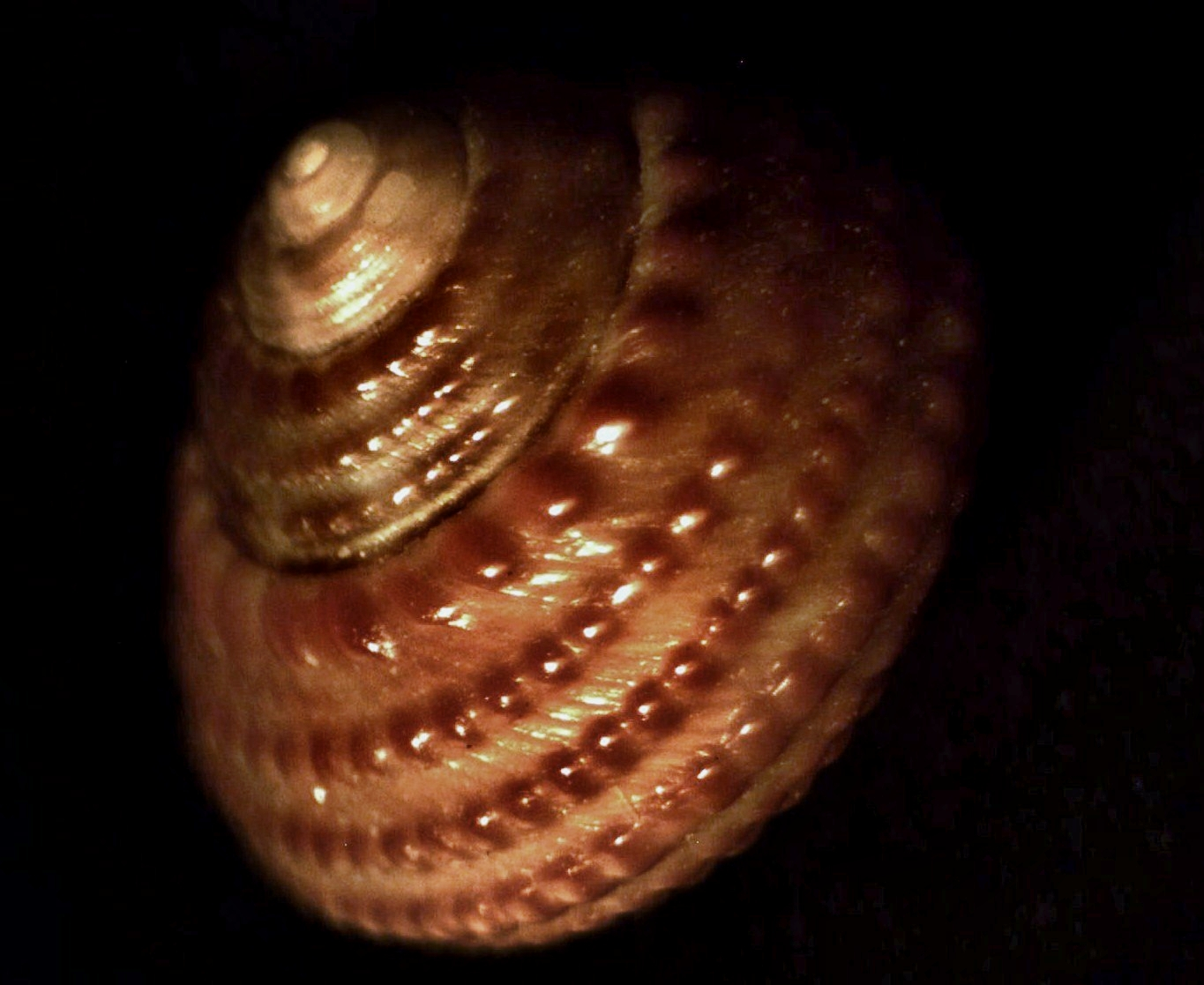
- View of a shell of Clanculus dunkeri

Scientific classification
- Kingdom: Animalia
- Phylum: Mollusca
- Class: Gastropoda
- Subclass: Vetigastropoda
- Order: Trochida
- Superfamily: Trochoidea
- Family: Trochidae
- Genus: Clanculus
- Species: C. dunkeri

Binomial name
- Clanculus dunkeri (Koch in Philippi, 1843)

Synonyms
- Clanculus rubens ("A. Adams") Angas, 1865; Clanculus (Isoclanculus) dunkeri (Koch, F.C.L. in Philippi, R.A., 1843); Isoclanculus weedingi Cotton, 1939; Monodonta rubra A. Adams in Angas, 1865; Trochus (Monodonta) dunkeri Koch in Philippi, 1843 (original description); Trochus dunkeri Fischer, 1880

= Clanculus dunkeri =

Species of gastropod

Clanculus dunkeri, common name Dunker's clanculus, is a species of sea snail, a marine gastropod mollusk in the family Trochidae, the top snails.

== Description ==
The height of the shell attains 9 mm, its diameter varies between 11 mm and 13 mm. The thick, solid, imperforate shell has a little hollow or depression at the place of the umbilicus. It is orbicularly conoid or subdepressed with 5 whorls. The first whorl is whitish, often eroded, the last brownish, purplish or red, obliquely striated, and ornamented with spiral granulose lirae, 3 on the penultimate whorl, 8 or 9 on the body whorl, of which the first is composed of larger beads, and the fourth forms the periphery. The interstices are about as wide as the lirae. The body whorl is somewhat gibbous and descends toward the aperture, which in adult specimens is somewhat contracted and subtrigonal. The outer lip shows a few deeply entering lirae within, the upper one terminating in a small denticle. The short columella is concave and smooth. It terminates in an acute narrow denticle, which is separated from a similar smaller tubercle on the base by a narrow notch.

== Distribution ==
This marine species is endemic to Australia and occurs in the subtidal zone off South Australia, Tasmania, Victoria and Western Australia.
