= Clanculus persicus =

Scientific classification
- Kingdom: Animalia
- Phylum: Mollusca
- Class: Gastropoda
- Subclass: Vetigastropoda
- Order: Trochida
- Superfamily: Trochoidea
- Family: Trochidae
- Genus: Clanculus
- Species: C. persicus

Binomial name
- Clanculus persicus Habe & Shikama [in Shikama], 1964

Species of gastropod

Clanculus persicus is a species of sea snail, a marine gastropod mollusk in the family Trochidae, the top snails.

== Description ==
The size of the shell varies between 15 mm and 24.8 mm.

== Distribution ==
This marine species occurs off the Philippines and New Zealand.
