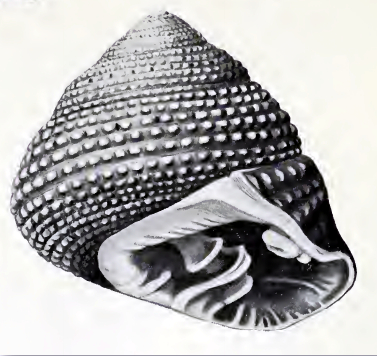
- The shell of Clanculus albinus

Scientific classification
- Kingdom: Animalia
- Phylum: Mollusca
- Class: Gastropoda
- Subclass: Vetigastropoda
- Order: Trochida
- Superfamily: Trochoidea
- Family: Trochidae
- Genus: Clanculus
- Species: C. albinus

Binomial name
- Clanculus albinus A. Adams, 1853

= Clanculus albinus =

Species of gastropod

Clanculus albinus is a species of sea snail, a marine gastropod mollusk in the family Trochidae, the top snails.

== Description ==
The size of the shell varies between 18 mm and 20 mm. The large, very solid shell is deeply and rather widely false-umbilicate. It has a globose-conic shape. The spire is obtuse and contains about six whorls. These are wound obliquely, slightly gradated, rounded at the periphery, a little descending and constricted at the aperture. The base of the shell is rather flat, extending obliquely. The colour of the shell is pale buff, punctate with small irregularly scattered crimson or brown dots. The sculpture of the shell shows small grains of nearly uniform size are crowded in close spiral rows. On the body whorl there are eighteen, on the penultimate seven, and on the antepenultimate six bead rows. Two or three spiral threads run along the shallow interstices which intervene between the rows. The oblique aperture is deltoid, choked by intrusions from right and left. From lip to lip a smooth thick but translucent callus spreads round the perforation. The very oblique columella arises deep within the perforation, and ends in a large projecting triplicate tubercle (the left intrusion). Above the tubercle is a fold, and above that a small denticle. The opposite intrusion is a massive tricuspid rooted within the margin of the lip, and hanging deep into the aperture. On the palate between the perforation and right insertion are three short entering bars, followed by another winding far into the interior. Inside the periphery are three long entering infrapalatal ridges alternating with short ones at the entrance. The basal margin shows half-a-dozen short transverse folds.

== Distribution ==
This marine species occurs in the Eastern Indian Ocean, the Indo-West Pacific, in Oceania and off Australia (Queensland).
