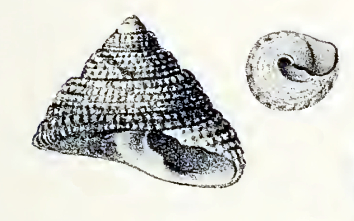
- Drawing showing two views of a shell of Clanculus undatoides

Scientific classification
- Kingdom: Animalia
- Phylum: Mollusca
- Class: Gastropoda
- Subclass: Vetigastropoda
- Order: Trochida
- Superfamily: Trochoidea
- Family: Trochidae
- Genus: Clanculus
- Species: C. undatoides

Binomial name
- Clanculus undatoides Tenison-Woods, 1879

Synonyms
- Isoclanculus undatoides (Tenison Woods, 1879); Trochus undatoides (Tenison-Woods, 1879)

= Clanculus undatoides =

Species of gastropod

Clanculus undatoides is a species of sea snail, a marine gastropod mollusk in the family Trochidae, the top snails.

== Description ==
The height of the shell attains 10 mm, its diameter also 10 mm. The rather small, somewhat solid shell is turbinately conoid. It is opaque, reddish rose with indistinct purple spots. The 5½ flat whorls increase rapidly in size. They are margined below, girdled with 6 series of rounded granules, of which the lowest line is the smallest. They increase gradually in size to the suture, which is coronate and broadly canaliculate. The base is flattened, ornamented with 8 spiral lines of close rose colored granules. The rhomboid aperture contains a thickened lip, which is lirate inside. The columella has two obtuse, blunt tubercles above and below, and intermediate small obsolete teeth. The narrow umbilicus is white, with a rather conspicuous white margin.

== Distribution ==
This marine species is endemic to Australia and occurs off New South Wales and Victoria.
