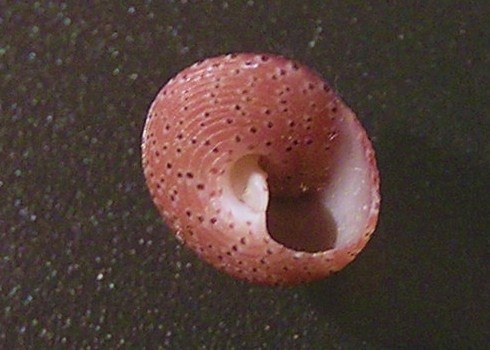
- view of a shell of Clanculus simoni

Scientific classification
- Kingdom: Animalia
- Phylum: Mollusca
- Class: Gastropoda
- Subclass: Vetigastropoda
- Order: Trochida
- Superfamily: Trochoidea
- Family: Trochidae
- Genus: Clanculus
- Species: C. simoni

Binomial name
- Clanculus simoni Poppe, Tagaro & Dekker, 2006

= Clanculus simoni =

Species of gastropod

Clanculus simoni is a species of sea snail, a marine gastropod mollusk in the family Trochidae, the top snails.

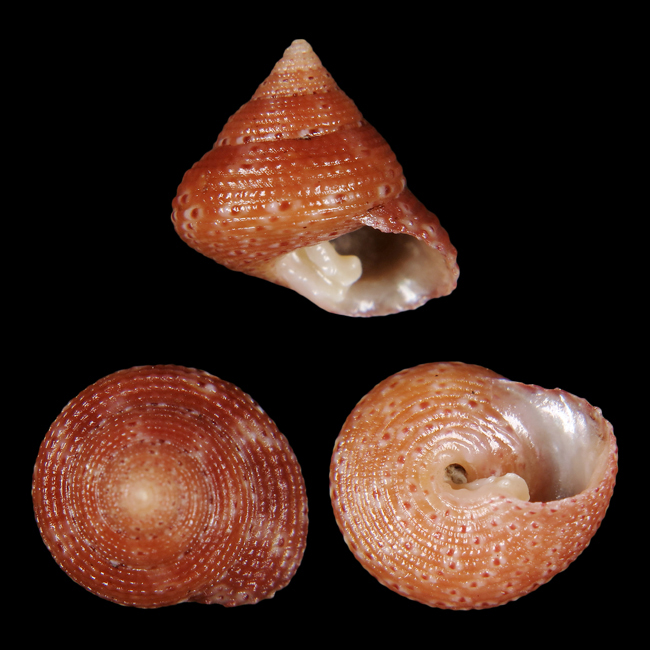
Seashell Clanculus simoni

== Description and identification ==
The size of the shell varies between 9.8 mm and 12.7 mm.

The shells are covered in cats eyes style dots, and are usually rose colored, leading up to cone shell becoming smaller as they go up the shell. The shell is also heavily banded.

== Reproduction ==
These species are mostly broadcast spawners, and the embryos evolve into planktonic trocophore larva then, juvenile veligers, eventually becoming full grown adults.

== Distribution ==
This marine species occurs off the Philippines.
