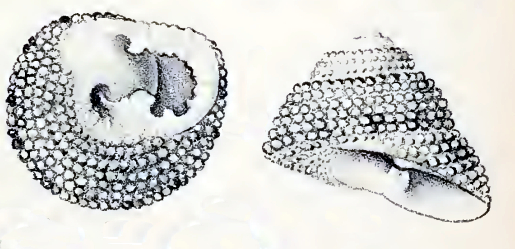
- Drawing showing two views of a shell of Clanculus personatus

Scientific classification
- Kingdom: Animalia
- Phylum: Mollusca
- Class: Gastropoda
- Subclass: Vetigastropoda
- Order: Trochida
- Superfamily: Trochoidea
- Family: Trochidae
- Genus: Clanculus
- Species: C. personatus

Binomial name
- Clanculus personatus (Philippi, 1849)

Synonyms
- Monodonta ringens Philippi, 1846 (junior homonym of Monodonta ringens Menke, 1843); Trochus personatus Philippi, 1849 (original description)

= Clanculus personatus =

Species of gastropod

Clanculus personatus, common name the masked clanculus, is a species of sea snail, a marine gastropod mollusk in the family Trochidae, the top snails.

== Description ==
The size of the shell attains 16 mm. The heavy, solid shell has a low conical shape. It is umbilicated and carinated. Its color is white, or suffused with a faint rose tint, with a series of small rose-colored maculations above the periphery and sometimes at the suture. The base of the shell is white or faintly marked with rose around the outer border. The about five whorls are slightly convex. They are separated by subcanaliculate sutures. The outline of the spire is a little convex. The first two whorls are smooth and eroded. The following are granose-lirate, the penultimate with 5 or 6, the last with 11 or 12 series of very distinct rounded granules, the 5th or 6th forming the periphery. The interstices are decussated by fine oblique and spiral striulae, which are sometimes obsolete. The body whorl is carinated at the periphery, lightly deflected toward the aperture, and much flattened there. The base of the shell is a trifle convex, the middle portion concave toward the umbilicus. The tetragonal aperture is very oblique and almost horizontal. The upper lip is straight, bearing a strong tubercular tooth midway. The outer and basal lips are well rounded, thickened and plicate-denticulate within. The basal margin is decidedly expanded and curved. The columella is very oblique, concave and toward the insertion, its edge scarcely reflexed, simple, bearing a single triangular projection or tooth below the middle, and terminating in a very strong, quadrate, biplicate tooth at its base. The parietal wall is wrinkled. The umbilicus penetrates deeper than the insertion of the columella and is bordered by a plicate rib. The peristome is much thickened inside.

== Distribution ==
This marine species is endemic to Australia and occurs off South Australia, Tasmania, Victoria and Western Australia.
