= Clanculus depictus =

Scientific classification
- Kingdom: Animalia
- Phylum: Mollusca
- Class: Gastropoda
- Subclass: Vetigastropoda
- Order: Trochida
- Superfamily: Trochoidea
- Family: Trochidae
- Genus: Clanculus
- Species: C. depictus

Binomial name
- Clanculus depictus A. Adams, 1854

Species of gastropod

Clanculus depictus is a species of sea snail, a marine gastropod mollusk in the family Trochidae, the top snails.

== Description ==
The pseudo-umbilicate shell has a conoid shape. It is white with green radial bands. It can also be yellow or gray with irregular black stripes running down the shell. It is decorated with unequal subgranose cinguli (spiral ornamentations). The whorls are plane, but the penultimate whorl is angulate. The margin of the umbilicus is simple. The top of the columella is uniplicate and below it has three small tubercles.

== Distribution ==
This species occurs in the Indian Ocean off Mumbai.
