= Clanculus petziae =

Scientific classification
- Kingdom: Animalia
- Phylum: Mollusca
- Class: Gastropoda
- Subclass: Vetigastropoda
- Order: Trochida
- Superfamily: Trochoidea
- Family: Trochidae
- Genus: Clanculus
- Species: C. petziae

Binomial name
- Clanculus petziae Rubio, Rolan & Ryall, 2002

Species of gastropod

Clanculus petziae is a species of sea snail, a marine gastropod mollusk in the family Trochidae, the top snails.
