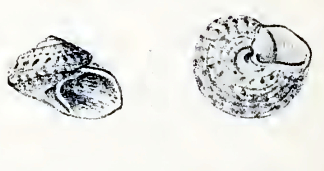
- Drawing showing two views of a shell of Clanculus albugo

Scientific classification
- Kingdom: Animalia
- Phylum: Mollusca
- Class: Gastropoda
- Subclass: Vetigastropoda
- Order: Trochida
- Superfamily: Trochoidea
- Family: Trochidae
- Genus: Clanculus
- Species: C. albugo

Binomial name
- Clanculus albugo (Watson, 1880)

Synonyms
- Minolia albugo (Watson, 1880); Trochus (Solariella) albugo Watson, 1880

= Clanculus albugo =

Species of gastropod

Clanculus albugo is a species of sea snail, a marine gastropod mollusk in the family Trochidae, the top snails.

== Description ==
The small, conoidal shell has a tumid conical base. It is bluntly bicarinate and umbilicate with a resinous luster. Its sculpture shows very many irregular oblique faint lines of growth, with a few remote rounded spirals, which are very weak above, stronger on the base, and of which two at the periphery form a feeble double carina. The color of the shell is: a pale transparent resinous brown, flecked below the sutures and, at the periphery with alternate spots of white and crimson. The latter color runs in minute zigzag streaks down the shell. There are also, both above and on the base, a few delicate spirals of alternate crimson and white specks. The spire is rather low, with curved profile lines and a blunt round apex. The five whorls are rounded and sloping above, flat at the periphery, and tumid on the base. The suture is linear and very slightly depressed. The round aperture is rather large. The outer lip is thin. The inner lip is thin, hollowed out backwards, and bending somewhat across the umbilicus. The umbilicus is a broad shallow funnel, contracting to a small deep hole.

== Distribution ==
This marine species is endemic to Australia and occurs off New South Wales.
