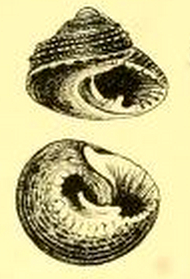
- Drawing showing two views of a shell of Clanculus consobrinus

Scientific classification
- Kingdom: Animalia
- Phylum: Mollusca
- Class: Gastropoda
- Subclass: Vetigastropoda
- Order: Trochida
- Superfamily: Trochoidea
- Family: Trochidae
- Genus: Clanculus
- Species: C. consobrinus

Binomial name
- Clanculus consobrinus Tate, 1893

= Clanculus consobrinus =

Species of gastropod

Clanculus consobrinus is a species of sea snail, a marine gastropod mollusk in the family Trochidae, the top snails.

== Description ==
The size of the shell varies between 8 mm and 13 mm. The shell is perforate and depressed. It is pinkish-brown, and sparsely black-dotted. The spire has a low-conic shape with an acute apex and five whorls. The suture is subcanaliculate. The body whorl is obtusely bi-angular at the periphery. The base of the shell is somewhat convex. The aperture is rounded and oblique. The outer and basal margins are lirate-dentate. The columella is oblique, neither tortuous above nor entering the umbilicus. Its front edge is plain, except a tooth at the base. The umbilicus is wide and deep, its margin crenate-dentate. The ornament of penultimate whorl consists of four equal and equidistant granulose lirae, and obliquely transverse raised threads. Of the body whorl, a small granulose lirais interposed between the third and fourth, anterior to the fourth are two smaller equally distant from one another, the fifth is slightly granulose, whilst the sixth, which is at the periphery, is broad and obtuse. The interspaces between the lirae are faintly spirally striate. The base has seven concentric lirae, the inner ones subgranose, the outer ones plain, with a few coincident striae in the interspaces.

== Distribution ==
This species is endemic to Australia and occurs off South Australia and Western Australia.
