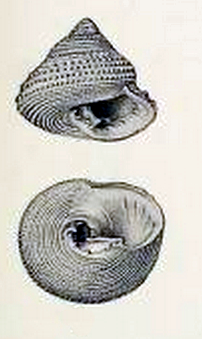
- Original drawing with two views of a shell of Clanculus mauritianus

Scientific classification
- Kingdom: Animalia
- Phylum: Mollusca
- Class: Gastropoda
- Subclass: Vetigastropoda
- Order: Trochida
- Superfamily: Trochoidea
- Family: Trochidae
- Genus: Clanculus
- Species: C. mauritianus

Binomial name
- Clanculus mauritianus Melvill, 1909

= Clanculus mauritianus =

Species of gastropod

Clanculus mauritianus is a species of sea snail, a marine gastropod mollusk in the family Trochidae, the top snails.

== Description ==
The height of the shell attains 9 mm, its diameter 12 mm. A pale brownish-pink-coloured Clanculus, with obscure pink spotting basally. It is depressedly conical, narrowly umbilicate, the umbilical region coarsely crenate. It is six- or seven-whorled, the three lowest whorls possessing, firstly, three rows of close spiral fine granules followed by others which have a fine spiral line dividing them, the interstices being very finely obliquely striate. Next, on the body whorl, below the periphery, the many—about 13—spiral rows of granules are quite close together, with no intermediary lines. The aperture is obliquely rotund. The outer lip is a little effuse, with four or five spiral short lirae just within the orifice. The columella is plicatulate above, and with a strong toothlike plait at the base.

== Distribution ==
This marine species occurs in the Indian Ocean off Mauritius and Réunion in the Mascarene Bassin.
