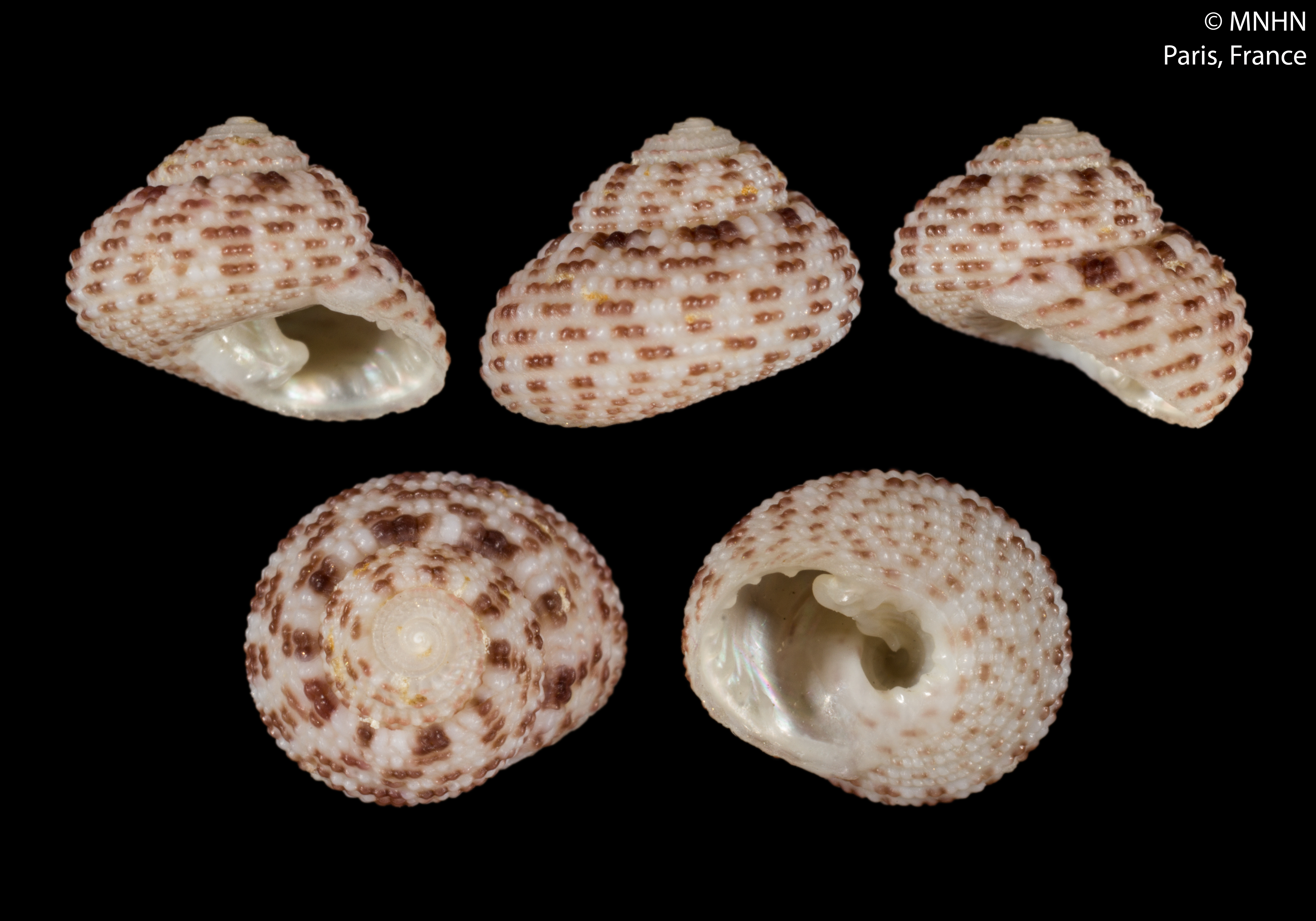
- Shell of Clanculus santamariae (holotype at MNHN, Paris)

Scientific classification
- Kingdom: Animalia
- Phylum: Mollusca
- Class: Gastropoda
- Subclass: Vetigastropoda
- Order: Trochida
- Superfamily: Trochoidea
- Family: Trochidae
- Genus: Clanculus
- Species: C. santamariae

Binomial name
- Clanculus santamariae Gofas, 1984

= Clanculus santamariae =

Species of gastropod

Clanculus santamariae is a species of sea snail, a marine gastropod mollusk in the family Trochidae, the top snails.

== Distribution ==
This species occurs in the Atlantic Ocean off Angola.
