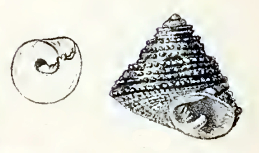
- Drawing showing two views of a shell of Clanculus ringens

Scientific classification
- Kingdom: Animalia
- Phylum: Mollusca
- Class: Gastropoda
- Subclass: Vetigastropoda
- Order: Trochida
- Superfamily: Trochoidea
- Family: Trochidae
- Genus: Clanculus
- Species: C. ringens

Binomial name
- Clanculus ringens (Menke, 1843)

Synonyms
- Monodonta ringens Menke, 1843 (original description); Trochus ringens Philippi, 1852

= Clanculus ringens =

Species of gastropod

Clanculus ringens, common name the ringent clanculus, is a species of sea snail, a marine gastropod mollusk in the family Trochidae, the top snails.

== Description ==
The size of the shell varies between 8 mm and 13 mm. The perforate shell has a conical shape and contains 7 whorls. The first whorl is smooth, yellowish; the following whorls are planulate, separated by canalicidate sutures. They are maculate with chestnut and white. They are spirally cingulate above with 4 elegantly granulate ridges, the upper and lower the larger. The body whorl is acutely carinated. The base of the shell is slightly convex, ornamented with 8 to 9 granose cinguli . The oblique aperture is rhomboidal and narrow. The basal margin is sulcate-denticulate. The oblique columella is strong and terminates below in a large tooth, ringent above. The columella is callous, ringent, and plicate.

== Distribution ==
This marine species is endemic to Australia and occurs off South Australia and Western Australia.
