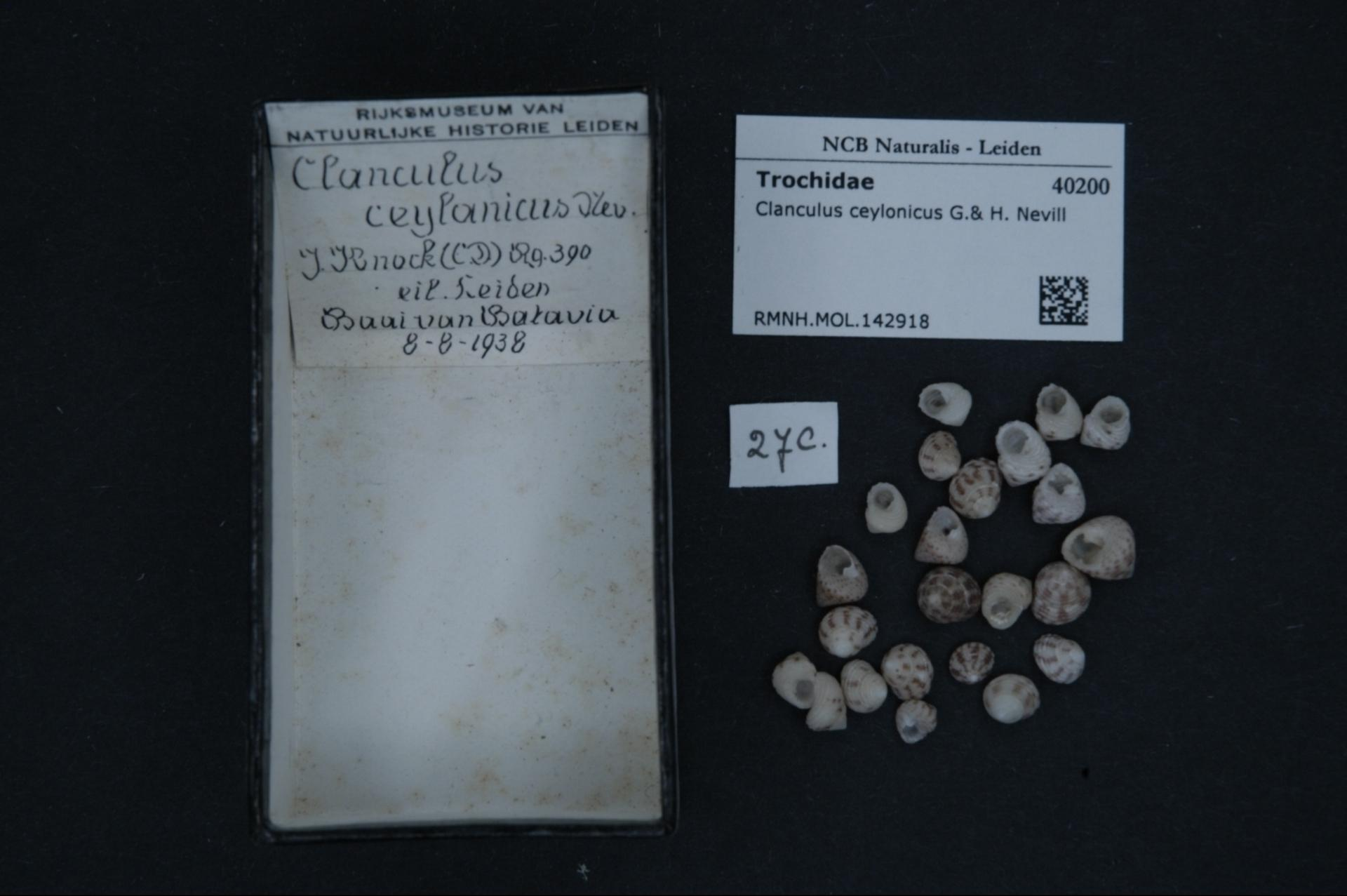
- Specimen of Clanculus ceylonicus

Scientific classification
- Kingdom: Animalia
- Phylum: Mollusca
- Class: Gastropoda
- Subclass: Vetigastropoda
- Order: Trochida
- Superfamily: Trochoidea
- Family: Trochidae
- Genus: Clanculus
- Species: C. ceylonicus

Binomial name
- Clanculus ceylonicus G. & H. Nevill, 1869

= Clanculus ceylonicus =

Species of gastropod

Clanculus ceylonicus is a species of sea snail, a marine gastropod mollusk in the family Trochidae, the top snails.

== Description ==
The size of the shell varies between 8 mm and 15 mm. The shell shows heavily beaded spiral cords, 11 on the last whorl. Small axial ribs join the beads in between.

== Distribution ==
This marine species occurs in the Indian Ocean off Réunion, India and Sri Lanka.
