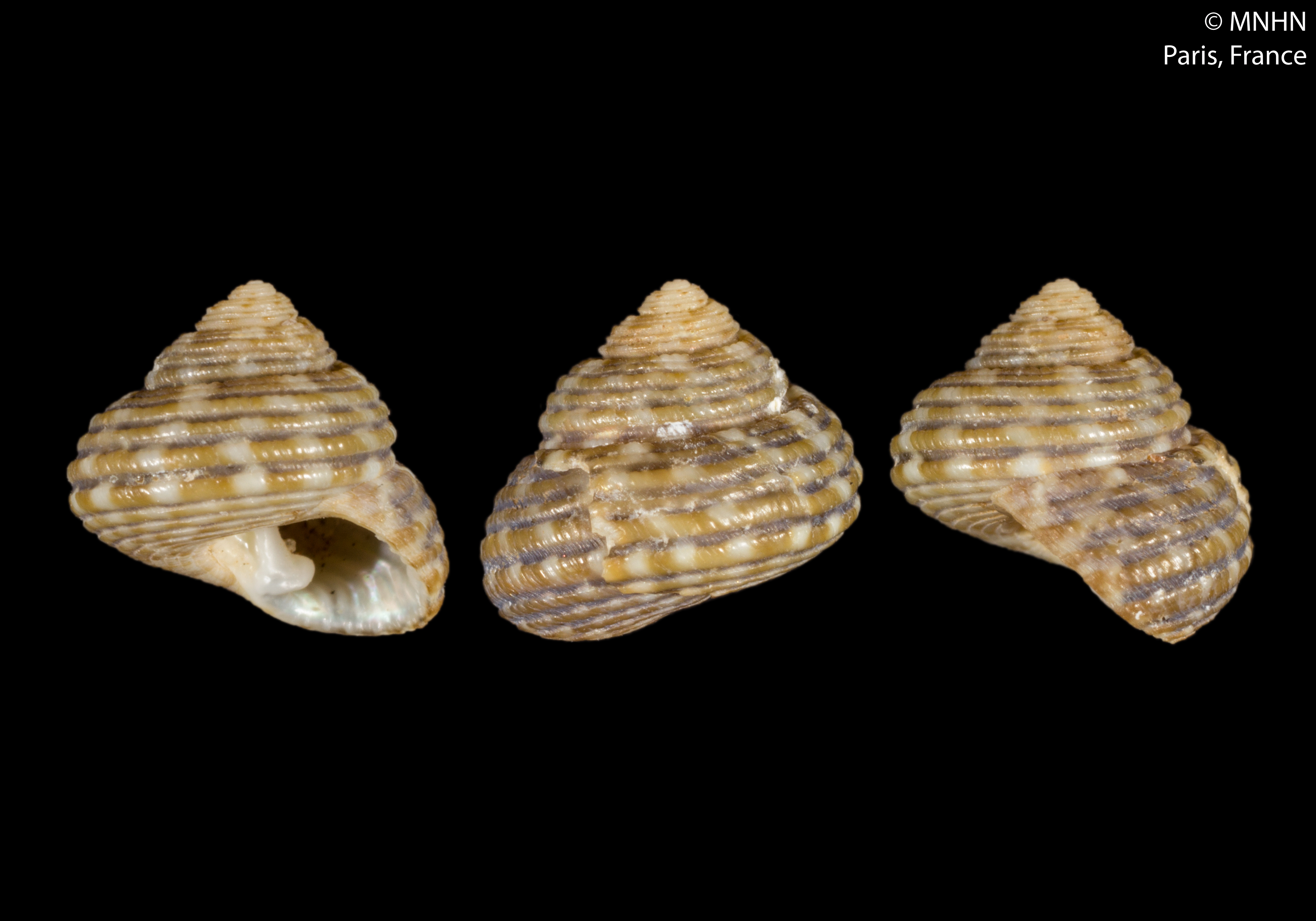
- Shell of Clanculus thomasi (syntype at MNHN, Paris)

Scientific classification
- Kingdom: Animalia
- Phylum: Mollusca
- Class: Gastropoda
- Subclass: Vetigastropoda
- Order: Trochida
- Superfamily: Trochoidea
- Family: Trochidae
- Genus: Clanculus
- Species: C. thomasi

Binomial name
- Clanculus thomasi (Crosse, 1862)

Synonyms
- Clanculus howeinsulae Salisbury, 1936; Trochus thomasi Crosse, 1862 (original description)

= Clanculus thomasi =

Species of gastropod

Clanculus thomasi is a species of sea snail, a marine gastropod mollusk in the family Trochidae, the top snails.

== Description ==
The size of the shell varies between 5 mm and 15 mm. The umbilicate shell has a conic-globose shape. It is maculate with white on a ground of reddish carmine. The five whorls are convex. They are spirally traversed by five very finely granulose lirae, the first two small, third larger, fourth small, fifth larger than the others. The suture is profoundly impressed and canaliculate. The body whorl contains 8 lirae on the base encircling the umbilicus. The columella is unequally bidentate. The basal tooth is larger and compressed. The lip at the base is obsoletely denticulate, elsewhere edentulous. The oblique aperture is less ringent than most species of Clanculus. The fauces (i.e. the part of the interior of a spiral shell that can be viewed by looking into the aperture) is sulcate and nacreous. The umbilicus is white, in young shells smooth, in adults obsoletely crenulated.

A variety is olivaceous green, maculate with white, the apex rosy. It is a small species, with very prominent, compressed basal tooth, and slight crenulations at the margin of the umbilicus, the right lip not dentate.

== Distribution ==
This marine species occurs off New Caledonia and Lord Howe Island.
