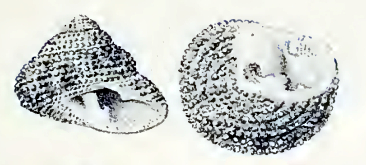
- Drawing showing two views of a shell of Clanculus floridus

Scientific classification
- Kingdom: Animalia
- Phylum: Mollusca
- Class: Gastropoda
- Subclass: Vetigastropoda
- Order: Trochida
- Superfamily: Trochoidea
- Family: Trochidae
- Genus: Clanculus
- Species: C. floridus

Binomial name
- Clanculus floridus (Philippi, 1850)

Synonyms
- Clanculus gibbosus A. Adams, 1853; Euriclanculus floridus Iredale, T. & McMichael, D.F. 1962; Trochus floridus Philippi, 1850 (original combination)

= Clanculus floridus =

Species of gastropod

Clanculus floridus, common name the florid clanculus, is a species of sea snail, a marine gastropod mollusk in the family Trochidae, the top snails.

== Description ==
The height of the shell varies between 8 and 9 mm, its diameter between 11 and 12 mm. The low conical, deeply umbilicate shell is subcarinate at the periphery. The carina is evanescent toward the termination of the body whorl. Its color is light brown or grayish, striped with rich brown, the markings somewhat interrupted around the middle of the upper surface of the body whorl. The stripes are more numerous and narrower at the periphery than upon the upper surface, and continued upon the base, or fading out there, and replaced by dots of brown on a light ground. The sutures are deeply impressed. The shell contains about five whorls. The apical ones are acute, pale pink, the following closely granose-cingulate. The body whorl contains about 17 to 21 closely beaded cinguli, of which the 8th or 9th usually forms the peripheral angle, all above that being subequal and equally spaced. Those of the base are more crowded and finer; the interstices are sharply, finely obliquely striate. The body whorl is deflected toward the aperture, and appearing gibbous. The aperture is subhorizontal, and subquadrangular. The outer lip shows a finely plicate thickening or rib within, and a strong tubercle near the upper angle. The basal margin is expanded, crenulated, and bearing a small but distinct central, very oblique fold within. The columella is very oblique, with a strong biplicate tooth below, a wide triangular projection at the middle, the whole edge reflexed but not distinctly crenulate. The insertion is located upon the side of the rather wide umbilicus, which has a radiately crenulated marginal rib. The parietal wall is wrinkled.

== Distribution ==
This marine species is endemic to Australia and occurs off New South Wales and Victoria
