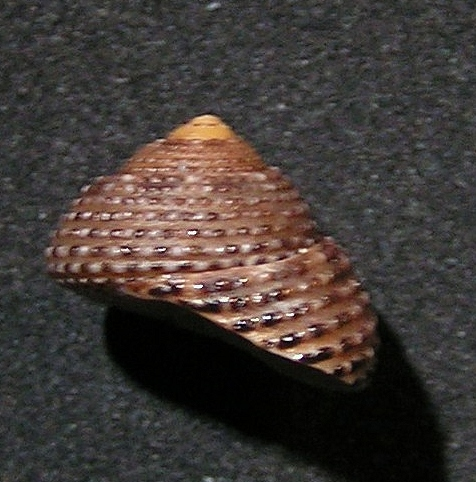
- Clanculus maxillatus C. T. Menke, 1843; South Australia

Scientific classification
- Kingdom: Animalia
- Phylum: Mollusca
- Class: Gastropoda
- Subclass: Vetigastropoda
- Order: Trochida
- Superfamily: Trochoidea
- Family: Trochidae
- Genus: Clanculus
- Species: C. maxillatus

Binomial name
- Clanculus maxillatus (Menke, 1843)

= Clanculus maxillatus =

Species of gastropod

Clanculus maxillatus is a species of sea snail, a marine gastropod mollusk in the family Trochidae, the top snail.
