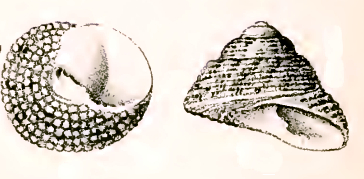
- Drawing showing two views of a shell of Clanculus aloysii

Scientific classification
- Kingdom: Animalia
- Phylum: Mollusca
- Class: Gastropoda
- Subclass: Vetigastropoda
- Order: Trochida
- Superfamily: Trochoidea
- Family: Trochidae
- Genus: Clanculus
- Species: C. aloysii

Binomial name
- Clanculus aloysii Tenison-Woods, 1876

Synonyms
- Isoclanculus aloysii Iredale, T. & McMichael, D.F. 1962; Trochus aloysii (Tenison-Woods, 1876)

= Clanculus aloysii =

Species of gastropod

Clanculus aloysii is a species of sea snail, a marine gastropod mollusk in the family Trochidae, the top snails.

== Description ==
The height of the shell varies between 8 mm and 9 mm, its diameter between 9 mm and 11 mm. The small, conical shell is carinated and umbilicated. it is whitish or corneous, marked above with zigzag radiating stripes (sometimes broken into dots) of sepia or black, below unicolored white or sparsely dotted with black. The peripheral carina is ornamented with a series of black spots. The spire is rather straightly conical with an acute apex and about six whorls. These are separated by subcanaliculate sutures. The upper surface is spirally sculptured with about 6 coarse, conspicuously granose lirae, of which the first and the sixth (or peripheral) are most prominent. The base of the shell is slightly convex, bearing 6 to 7 concentric, coarse, conspicuously granose separated lirae. The aperture is rhomboidal. The outer lip is iridescent and plicate within. The basal margin is rounded and denticulate. The oblique columella is nearly straight, slightly folded above and bidentate at its base. The umbilicus has (in fully adult specimens) a crenate marginal rib, white within, and perforating scarcely deeper than the insertion of the columella.

== Distribution ==
This marine species is endemic to Australia and occurs off New South Wales, Tasmania and Victoria.
