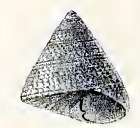
- Original drawing of a shell

Scientific classification
- Kingdom: Animalia
- Phylum: Mollusca
- Class: Gastropoda
- Subclass: Vetigastropoda
- Order: Trochida
- Family: Trochidae
- Genus: Pulchrastele; Iredale, 1929
- Species: P. septenarium

Binomial name
- Pulchrastele septenarium (Melvill & Standen, 1899)

Synonyms
- Calliostoma septenarium Melvill & Standen, 1899

= Pulchrastele =

Genus of molluscs

Pulchrastele septenarium is a species of sea snail in the family Trochidae, the top snails. It is the only described species in the genus Pulchrastele.

== Description ==
The shell grows to a length of 13 mm. The solid, pyramidally conical shell is deeply but narrowly umbilicate. The seven whorls are all, with the exception of the two apical which are smooth and glossy, closely spirally seven-ribbed. These ribs are thickly and regularly formed of gemmae (buds or bud-like growth), contiguous and crowded. The interstices between these beaded riblets are indistinctly obliquely striated. The body whorl is sharply angled at the periphery. At the base there are eight or nine concentric rows of the same kind of beaded ribs as under the whorls. The interstices are very similarly obliquely striate. The aperture is square. The outer lip is slightly thickened, whilst at the columellar margin a small central tooth is observable.

== Distribution ==
This marine species is endemic to Australia and occurs off the Northern Territory and Queensland.
