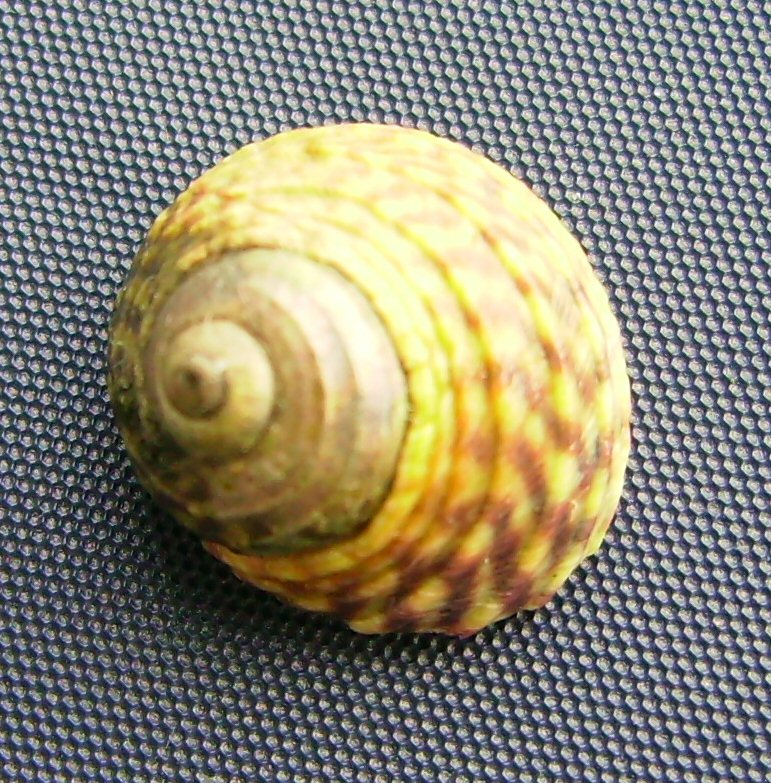
- A shell of Diloma subrostrata
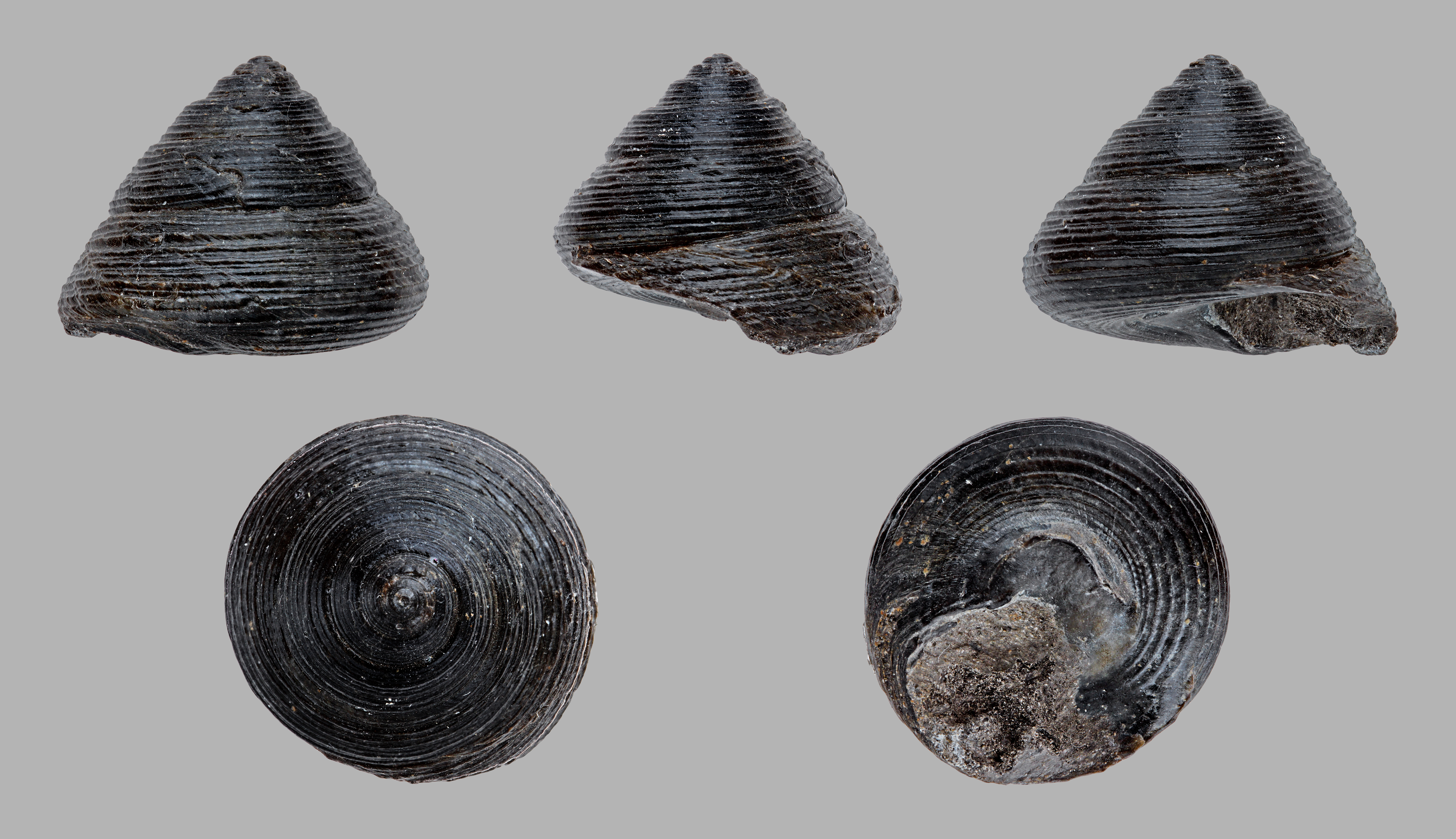
- Five views of a fossil shell of Diloma orientalis (Cossmann & Peyrot, 1917)

Scientific classification
- Kingdom: Animalia
- Phylum: Mollusca
- Class: Gastropoda
- Subclass: Vetigastropoda
- Order: Trochida
- Superfamily: Trochoidea
- Family: Trochidae
- Genus: Diloma; Philippi, 1845

Type species
- Turbo nigerrimus Gmelin, 1791

Species
- See text

Synonyms
- Anisodiloma Finlay, 1926; Cavodiloma Finlay, 1926; Fractarmilla Finlay, 1926; Melagraphia Gray, 1847; Monodonta (Neodiloma) P. Fischer, 1885 junior subjective synonym; Neodiloma P. Fischer, 1885; Trochus (Diloma) R. A. Philippi, 1845 superseded rank; Zediloma Finlay, 1926; Zediloma (Fractarmilla) H. J. Finlay, 1926 junior subjective synonym

= Diloma =

Genus of gastropods

Diloma is a genus of medium-sized sea snails, marine gastropod mollusks in the family Trochidae, the top snails.

There is also a genus Diloma, F.H.Wind & P.Cepek, 1979 a genus of phytoplankton in the class Prymnesiophyceae

== Description ==
The solid shell is imperforate and depressed globose. It is slate-colored or black, sometimes (especially if worn) reddish or brownish. The conic spire is short. The apex is acute, usually reddish. The sutures are linear. The five whorls are slightly convex, rapidly increasing and spirally obsoletely striate. The body whorl is usually depressed or subconcave below the suture. The base of the shell is rounded, eroded and iridescent in front of the aperture. The aperture is huge, oblique iridescent. The outer lip is rather thin, not black-margined within; but bordered by a brilliantly iridescent band; The columella is concave, obsoletely subdentate below, very broad and flattened or excavated on the face. It is composed principally of an opaque white layer which also lines the base but does not extend to the edge of the lip. The length of the shell varies between 15 mm and 26 mm. Its diameter varies between 17 mm and 24 mm.

== Distribution ==
This genus occurs in the Indo-Pacific, including New Zealand, Japan, and other areas.

== Species ==
Partial phylogram of the species in the genus Diloma:

- Diloma
  - - Diloma samoaense Schwabe & Barclay, 2003
    - Diloma radula (Philippi, 1849)
  - - - Diloma aethiops Gmelin, 1791
      - Diloma subrostrata (Gray in Yate, 1835)
    - - Diloma concamerata (Wood, 1828)
      - - Diloma zelandica (Quoy & Gaimard, 1834)
        - - - Diloma crusoeana (Pilsbry, 1889)
            - Diloma nigerrima (Gmelin, 1791)
          - - Diloma bicanaliculatum (Dunker, 1844)
            - - Diloma arida (Finlay, 1927)
              - Diloma coracina (Philippi, 1851)

Other species in the genus not included in the phylogram include:

- Diloma aethiops (Gmelin, 1791)
- Diloma amoenum (A. A. Gould, 1849)
- Diloma aridum (H. J. Finlay, 1926)
- Diloma bicanaliculatum (Dunker, 1845)
- Diloma concameratum (W. Wood, 1828)
- Diloma coracinum (Troschel, 1851)
- Diloma durvillaea Spencer, Marshall & Waters, 2009
- Diloma filipino S.-I Huang, I-F. Fu, K.-H. Hu & C.-P. Chen, 2026
- Diloma hsiujuae S.-I Huang, I-F. Fu, K.-H. Hu & C.-P. Chen, 2026
- Diloma imitationis S.-I Huang, I-F. Fu, K.-H. Hu & C.-P. Chen, 2026
- Diloma lepidum (A. A. Gould, 1861)
- Diloma miocenica S. N. Nielsen, Frassinetti & Bandel, 2004 †
- Diloma nanum Gould, 1861
- Diloma nigerrimum (Gmelin, 1791)
- Diloma oriens S.-I Huang, I-F. Fu, K.-H. Hu & C.-P. Chen, 2026
- Diloma piperinum (R. A. Philippi, 1849)
- Diloma radula (R. A. Philippi, 1849)
- Diloma samoaense Schwabe & Barclay, 2003
- Diloma subrostratum (J. E. Gray, 1835)
- Diloma sulci S.-I Huang, I-F. Fu, K.-H. Hu & C.-P. Chen, 2026
- Diloma triumtrium S.-I Huang, I-F. Fu, K.-H. Hu & C.-P. Chen, 2026
- Diloma yanliaoense S.-I Huang, I-F. Fu, K.-H. Hu & C.-P. Chen, 2026
- Diloma zelandicum (Quoy & Gaimard, 1834)

Species brought into synonymy:

- Diloma arida (H. J. Finlay, 1926): synonym of Diloma aridum (H. J. Finlay, 1926) (incorrect gender agreement of specific epithet)
- Diloma constellatum Souverbie, 1863: synonym of Austrocochlea constellata (Souverbie, 1863)
- Diloma gaimardi Hutton: synonym of Diloma aethiops Gmelin, 1791
- Diloma impervium (Menke, 1843): synonym of Oxystele impervia (Menke, 1843)
- Diloma nana A. A. Gould, 1861: synonym of Diloma nanum A. A. Gould, 1861 (incorrect grammatical agreement of specific epithet)
- Diloma plumbea F. W. Hutton, 1882: synonym of Diloma subrostratum (J. E. Gray, 1835) (junior subjective synonym)
- Diloma sinense (Gmelin, 1791) :synonym of Oxystele sinensis (Gmelin, 1791)
- Diloma suavis (Philippi, 1849): synonym of Pictodiloma suavis (Philippi, 1849)
- Diloma tabulare (Krauss, 1848): synonym of Oxystele tabularis (Krauss, 1848)
- Diloma tigrinum (Anton, 1838): synonym of Oxystele tigrina (Anton, 1838)
- Diloma variegatum (Anton, 1838): synonym of Oxystele antoni D. G. Herbert, 2015
- Diloma subrostratum novaezelandiae Anton, 1838: synonym of Diloma subrostratum (Gray in Yate, 1835)
- Diloma (Chlorodiloma) millelineata (Bonnett, 1864): synonym of Chlorodiloma millelineata (Bonnett, 1864)
- Diloma (Fractarmilla) lenior Finlay, H.J., 1927: synonym of Diloma bicanaliculatum (Dunker, 1844)
