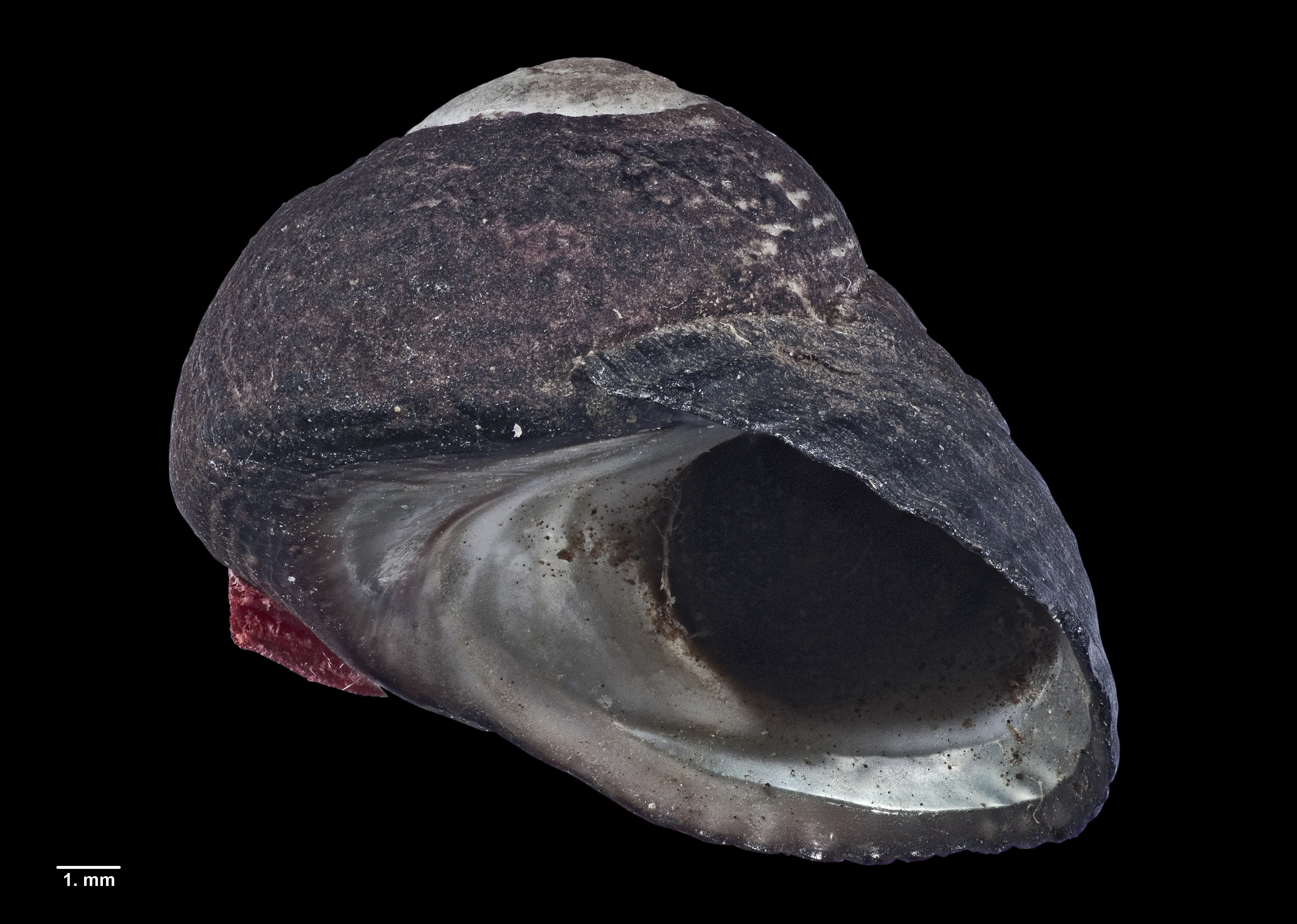

Scientific classification
- Kingdom: Animalia
- Phylum: Mollusca
- Class: Gastropoda
- Subclass: Vetigastropoda
- Order: Trochida
- Superfamily: Trochoidea
- Family: Trochidae
- Genus: Diloma
- Species: D. aridum

Binomial name
- Diloma aridum (Finlay, 1927)

Synonyms
- Diloma coracina Suter, H., 1909; Monodonta coracina Suter, 1913; Zediloma arida Finlay, 1927

= Diloma aridum =

Species of gastropod

Diloma aridum is a species of small sea snail, a marine gastropod mollusc in the family Trochidae. This species is a part of the broader genus Diloma that engrosses other marine gastropods like Diloma aethiops and Diloma bicanaliculatum.

Diloma aridum is primarily found on sheltered mid-tidal rocks in the Chatham Islands and Auckland Islands and is habitual to specific regions in New Zealand.

== Description ==
The height of the shell attains 19 mm, its diameter is 17 mm. It is a purplish-black marine snail with pale yellow flecks in appearance.

== Distribution ==
This marine species is endemic to Chatham Islands, New Zealand and Auckland Islands and occurs on sheltered mid-tidal rocks.
