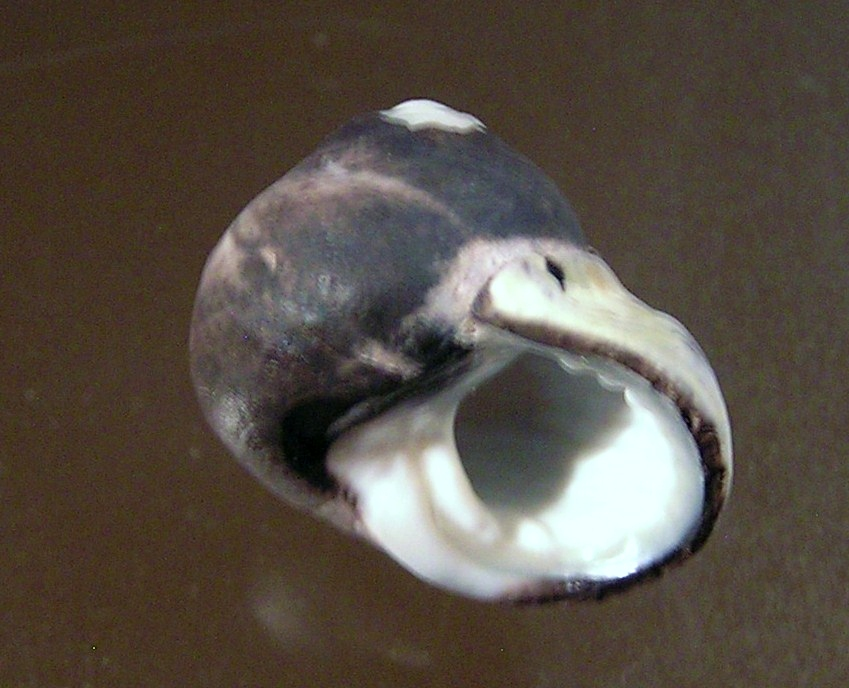
- Austrocochlea rudis

Scientific classification
- Kingdom: Animalia
- Phylum: Mollusca
- Class: Gastropoda
- Subclass: Vetigastropoda
- Order: Trochida
- Superfamily: Trochoidea
- Family: Trochidae
- Genus: Austrocochlea; Fischer, 1885

Type species
- Monodonta constricta Lamarck, J.B.P.A. de, 1822

Synonyms
- Fractarmilla Finlay, 1926; Gibbula Risso, 1826

= Austrocochlea =

Genus of gastropods

Austrocochlea is a genus of medium-sized sea snails, marine gastropod molluscs in the family Trochidae, the top snails, also known as top shells.

This genus was founded as a subgenus by Fisher in 1885 to include a small group of Australian species, included in the genus Monodonta. They had previously been included in Trochocochlea Klein, 1753 ( = Osilinus Philippi, 1847), a section that was then restricted to the Mediterranean group.

== Characteristics ==
The tubercle at the base of the columella is non-truncated and only slightly prominent.

== Distribution ==
This marine species occurs off the Philippines and mainly off Australia.

== Species ==
Species within the genus Austrocochlea include:

- Austrocochlea brevis Parsons & Ward, 1994
- Austrocochlea constellata (Souverbie, 1863)
- Austrocochlea constricta (Lamarck, 1822), the southern ribbed top snail
- Austrocochlea diminuta (Hedley, 1912)
- Austrocochlea porcata (A. Adams, 1853), the zebra top snail
- Austrocochlea rudis Gray, 1826
- Austrocochlea zeus P. Fischer, 1874

Species brought into synonymy

- Austrocochlea adelaidae (Philippi, 1851): synonym of Chlorodiloma adelaidae (Philippi, 1849)
- Austrocochlea concamerata (Wood, 1828): synonym of Diloma concamerata (Wood, 1828)
- Austrocochlea obtusa Iredale, T. & McMichael, D.F. 1962: synonym of Austrocochlea constricta (Lamarck, 1822)
- Austrocochlea odontis (W. Wood, 1828): synonym of Chlorodiloma odontis (W. Wood, 1828)
- Austrocochlea piperina (Philippi, 1849): synonym of Diloma piperinum (R. A. Philippi, 1849) (superseded combination)
- Austrocochlea porcata Iredale, T. & McMichael, D.F. 1962: synonym of Austrocochlea constricta (Lamarck, 1822)
- Austrocochlea quadrasi (Sowerby III, 1898): synonym of Monodonta (Austrocochlea) quadrasi G. B. Sowerby III, 1898
- Austrocochlea torri Cotton & Godfrey, 1934: synonym of Austrocochlea constricta (Lamarck, 1822)
- Austrocochlea tricingulata (Adams, A., 1853): synonym of Austrocochlea quadrasi Sowerby III, 1898
- Austrocochlea zebra Menke, K.T., 1829: synonym of Austrocochlea constricta (Lamarck, 1822) (unaccepted > junior subjective synonym)
