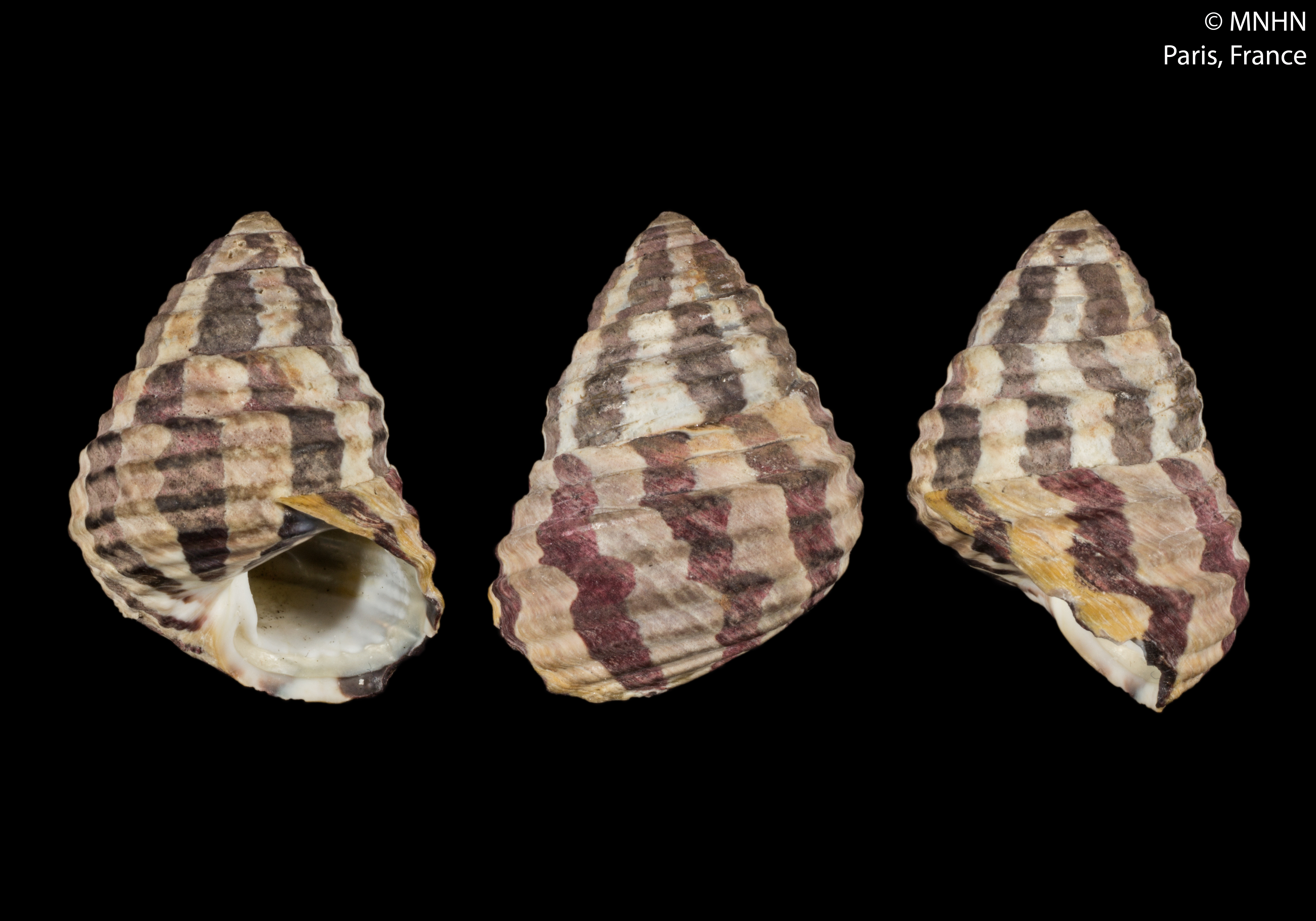
- Shell of Austrocochlea porcata (syntype at MNHN, Paris)
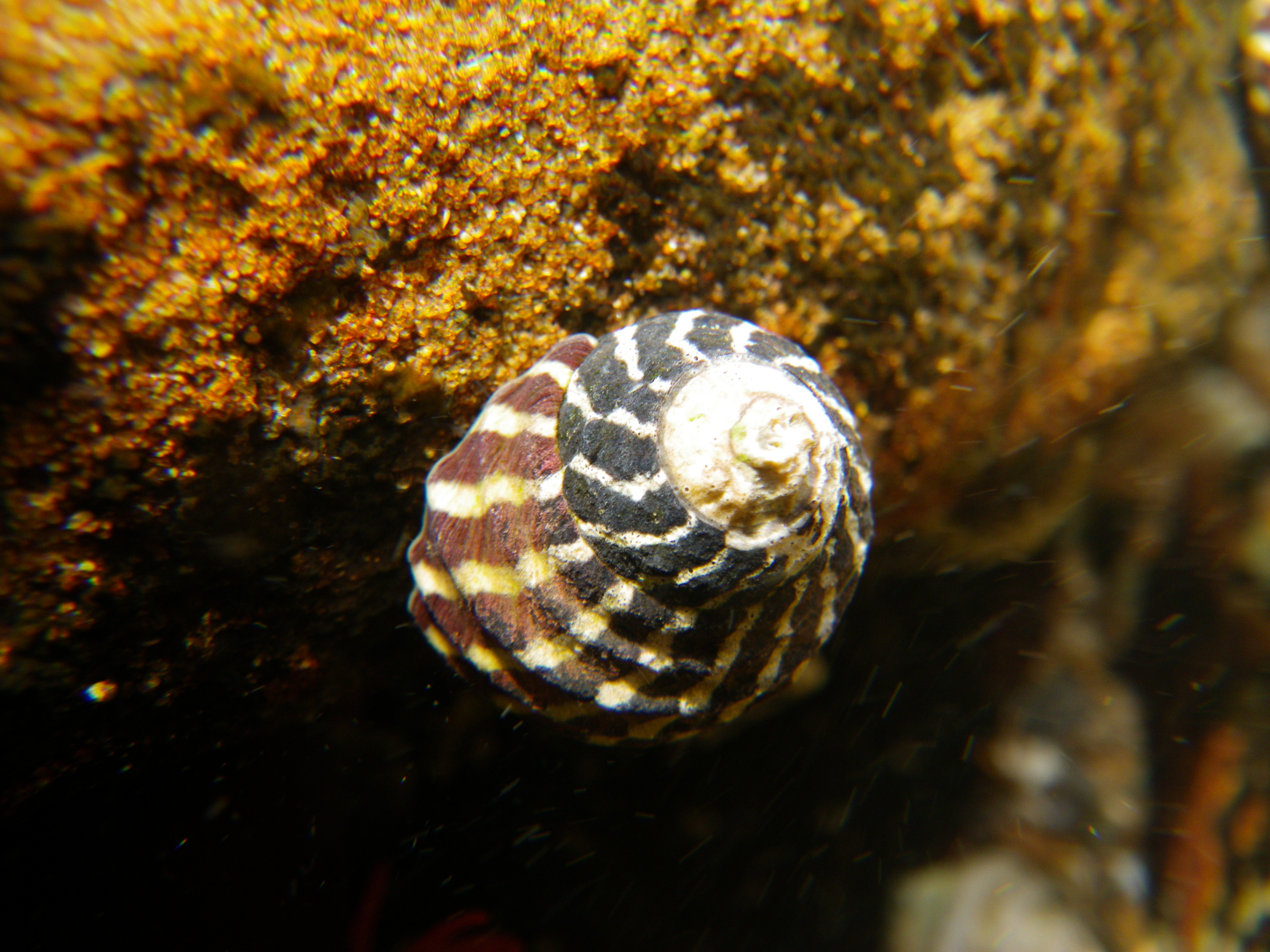
- Wide striped variant

Scientific classification
- Kingdom: Animalia
- Phylum: Mollusca
- Class: Gastropoda
- Subclass: Vetigastropoda
- Order: Trochida
- Superfamily: Trochoidea
- Family: Trochidae
- Genus: Austrocochlea
- Species: A. porcata

Binomial name
- Austrocochlea porcata (A. Adams, 1853)

Synonyms
- Labio porcata A. Adams, 1851 (original description); Trochus taeniatus Quoy, H.E.T. & J.P. Gaimard, 1834

= Austrocochlea porcata =

Species of gastropod

The zebra top snail, scientific name Austrocochlea porcata, is a medium-sized sea snail, a marine gastropod mollusc in the family Trochidae, the top snails, also known as top shells.

== Shell description ==
The size of the shell varies between 20 mm and 43 mm.

(Original description in Latin) The shell is ovate-conical and without an umbilicus, dark brown in color and marked with a white net-like pattern. Its whorls are convex and crossed by numerous elevated transverse keels that stand apart from one another. The inner lip is white and somewhat calloused below, while the outer lip is grooved on the inside.

The shell has a black-and-white banded pattern overlying a light grey to white shell. It is very similar to that of the southern ribbed top snail, Austrocochlea constricta, and until recently the two species were considered to be identical. The aperture is less dilated, than in Austrocochlea constricta. The columellar tubercle is obsolete.

== Distribution ==
This marine species is endemic to Australia and occurs off Central Queensland to Western Australia and also off Tasmania.
