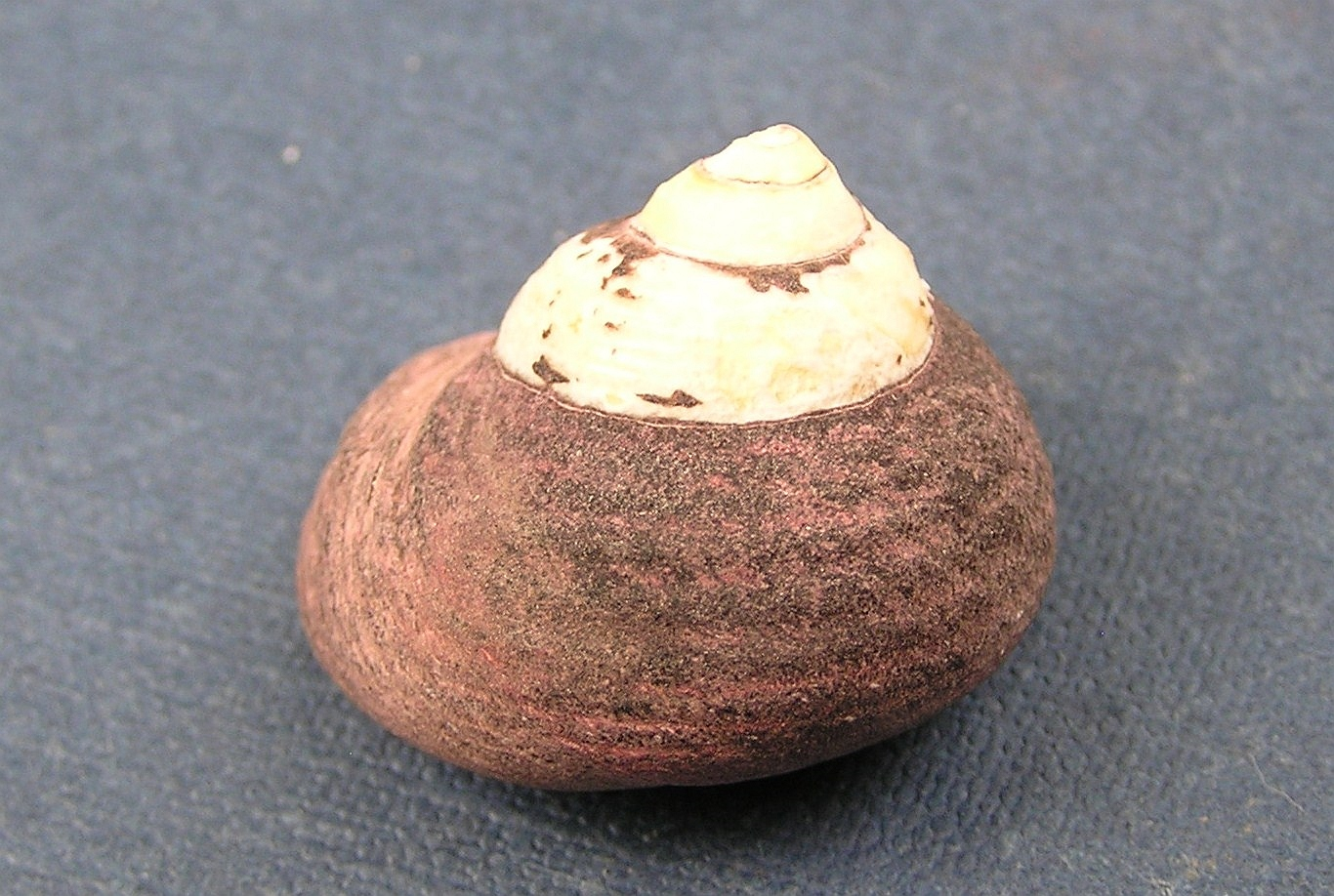
- Oxystele tigrina

Scientific classification
- Kingdom: Animalia
- Phylum: Mollusca
- Class: Gastropoda
- Subclass: Vetigastropoda
- Order: Trochida
- Superfamily: Trochoidea
- Family: Trochidae
- Genus: Oxystele; Philippi, 1847

Type species
- Trochus merula Dillwyn, 1817

= Oxystele =

Genus of sea snails

Oxystele is a genus of sea snails, marine gastropod mollusks in the family Trochidae, the top snails. Although previously suggested as a subgenus of Diloma, genetic analysis has shown it to be more appropriate as its own genus.

== Description ==
The depressed conical shell is dark or variegated in color. The large aperture is oblique. The concave columella is arcuate, thin-edged, perfectly simple and curved below. It is above spread over the umbilical area as a rounded, well-defined pad of callus.

Patterns of the variegated shell color within the genus Oxystele are shown in the image : A–C Oxystele variegata from Namibia, 5 km north of Swakopmund, diameter 22.2 mm (NMSA E6038) D–F Oxystele impervia from the Western Cape, Groen Rivier, diameter 22.3 mm (NMSA E7353) G–I Oxystele sp. from the Eastern Cape, Tsitsikamma National Park, diameter 16.5 mm (HVDBM058-10, NMSA W7371); the colour pattern of these specimens suggests Oxystele variegata, but these specimens group within the unit of Oxystele impervia J–L Oxystele sp. from the Northern Cape, Noup, diameter 18.0 mm (HVDBM185-10, NMSA W7608); the colour pattern suggests Oxystele impervia, but they group with Oxystele variegata

== Distribution ==
These marine species occur off South Africa and Japan.

== Species ==
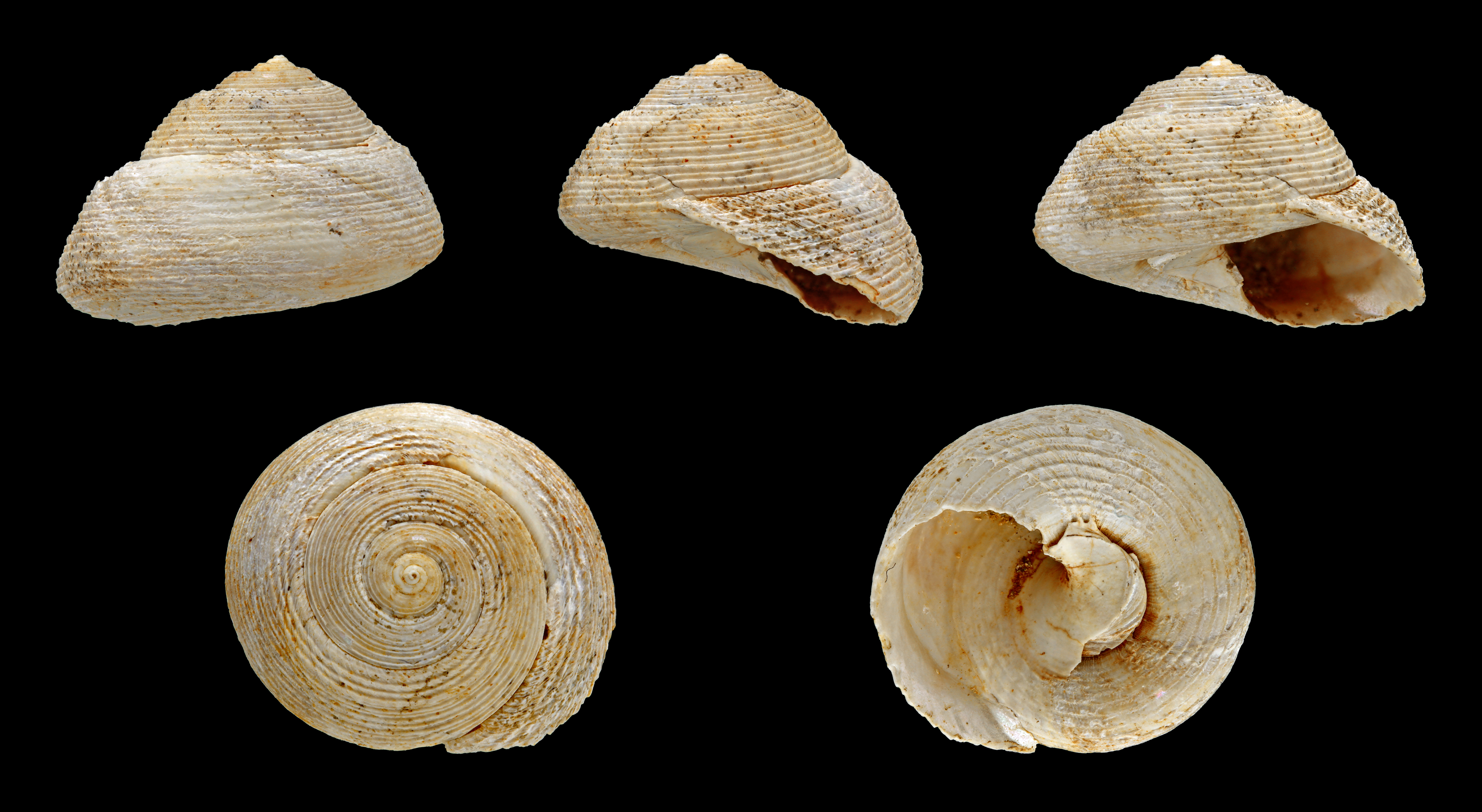
Oxystele burdigalensis Cossmann & Peyrot 1916, a fossil species from the Miocene of France

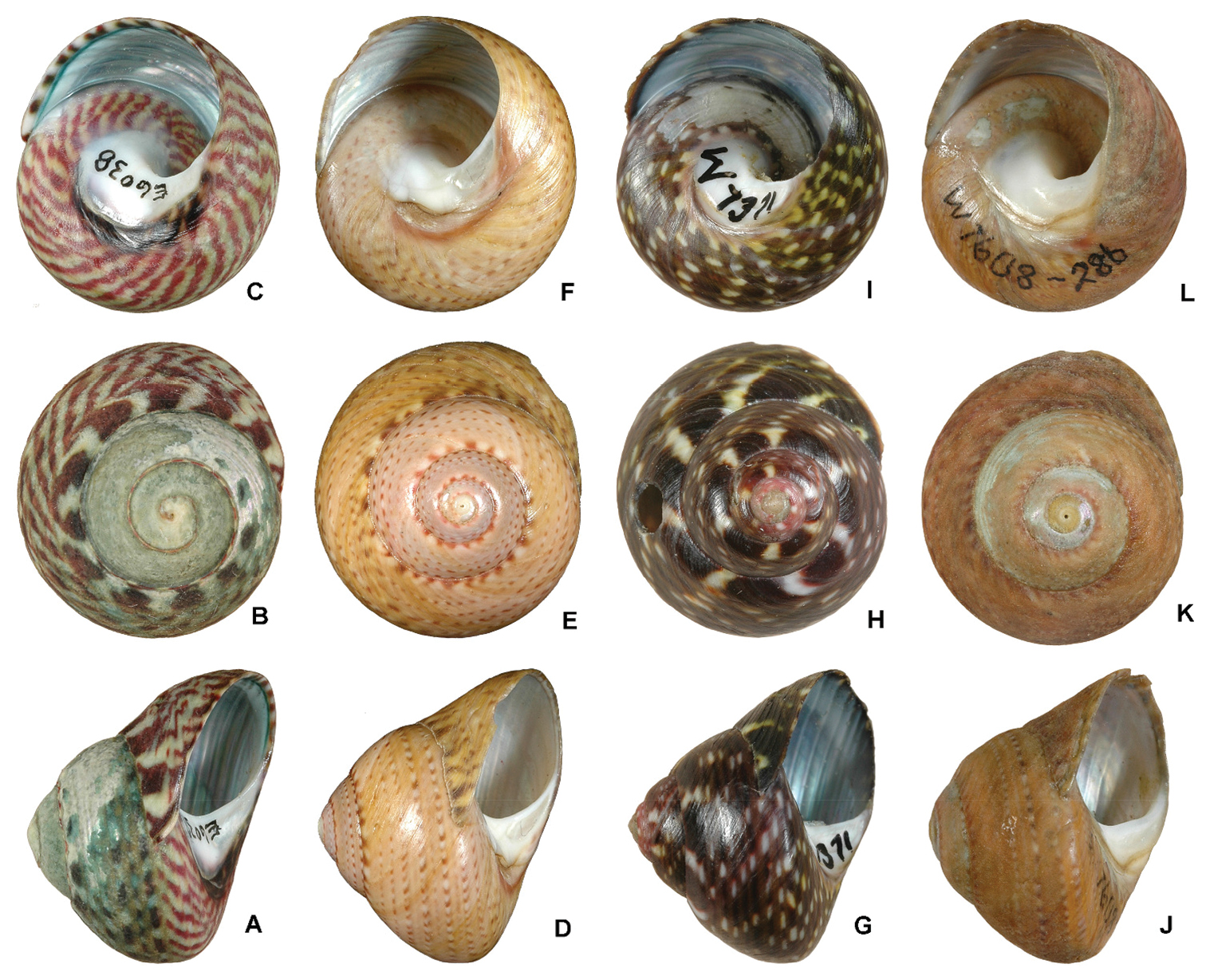
Patterns of shell color within the genus Oxystele

Phylogram (weighted maximum parsimony based on 16S, COI and actin sequence data) of the species in the genus Oxystele:

- Oxystele
  - - O. tigrina (Anton, 1839)
    - O. sinensis (Gmelin, 1791)
  - - O. tabularis (Krauss, 1848)
    - - O. impervia (Menke, 1843)
      - O. antoni (Anton, 1839)

Other species in the genus not included in this tree are:

- Oxystele fulgurata (Philippi, 1848)
- Oxystele merula (Dillwyn, 1817)

Species brought into synonymy:

- Oxystele capensis (Gmelin, 1791): synonym of Oxystele sinensis (Gmelin, 1791)
- Oxystele depressa Granata-Grillo, 1877: synonym of Tomura depressa (Granata-Grillo, 1877)
- Oxystele impervius Menke, Schwarz, 1910: synonym of Oxystele variegata (Anton, 1838)
- Oxystele inflata Turton, 1932: synonym of Oxystele sinensis (Gmelin, 1791)
- Oxystele romettensis Granata-Grillo, 1877: synonym of Cirsonella romettensis (Granata-Grillo, 1877)
- Oxystele sagittifera Lamarck, Smith, 1903: synonym of Oxystele variegata (Anton, 1838)
- Oxystele sagittifera var. perdix Koch in Turton, 1932: synonym of Oxystele tigrina (Anton, 1838)
- Oxystele sagittifera var. rufanensis Turton, 1932: synonym of Oxystele variegata (Anton, 1838)
- Oxystele tabularis var. pulchra Turton, 1932: synonym of Oxystele variegata (Anton, 1838)
- Oxystele tigrinus Turton 1932: synonym of Oxystele tigrina (Anton, 1838)
- Oxystele variegata (Anton, 1838) accepted as Oxystele antoni D. G. Herbert, 2015
- Oxystele zonata Wood, Sowerby, 1892: synonym of Gibbula zonata (Wood, 1828)
