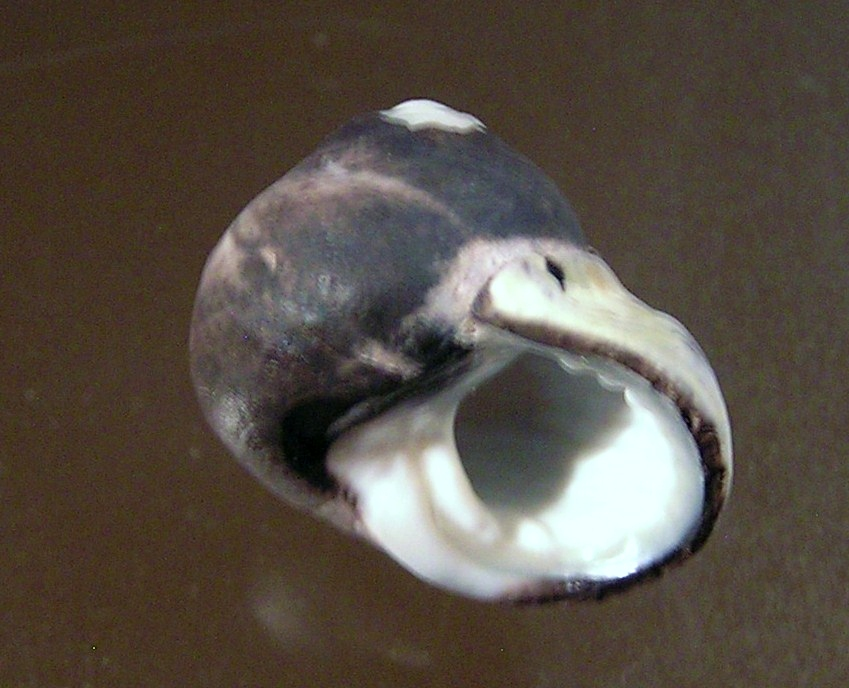
- Apertural view of a shell of Austrocochlea rudis

Scientific classification
- Kingdom: Animalia
- Phylum: Mollusca
- Class: Gastropoda
- Subclass: Vetigastropoda
- Order: Trochida
- Superfamily: Trochoidea
- Family: Trochidae
- Genus: Austrocochlea
- Species: A. rudis

Binomial name
- Austrocochlea rudis (Gray, 1826)

Synonyms
- Fractarmilla rudis auct.; Labio rudis A. Adams, 1851 (taxon inquirendum); Monodonta melanostoma Menke, 1843; Monodonta rudis Gray, 1826 (original description); Trochacochlea chloropoda Tate, 1879; Trochus carbonarius auct.

= Austrocochlea rudis =

Species of gastropod

Austrocochlea rudis, common name the rough periwinkle or the roughened austrocochlea, is a species of sea snail, a marine gastropod mollusk in the family Trochidae, the top snails.

== Description ==
The imperforate shell has an orbiculate-conical shape. The blunt spire shows transversal black lines and oblique longitudinal striae. The columella is subtuberculate. The smooth lip is black and within with a golden yellow margin.

== Distribution ==
This marine species is endemic to Australia and occurs off South Australia and Western Australia
