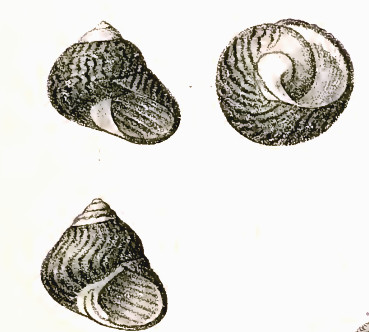
- Drawing with three views of a shell of Oxystele fulgurata

Scientific classification
- Kingdom: Animalia
- Phylum: Mollusca
- Class: Gastropoda
- Subclass: Vetigastropoda
- Order: Trochida
- Superfamily: Trochoidea
- Family: Trochidae
- Genus: Oxystele
- Species: O. fulgurata

Binomial name
- Oxystele fulgurata (Philippi, 1848)

Synonyms
- Monodonta fulgurata (Philippi, 1848); Trochus fulguratus Philippi, 1848

= Oxystele fulgurata =

Species of gastropod

Oxystele fulgurata is a species of sea snail, a marine gastropod mollusk in the family Trochidae, the top snails.

== Description ==
The height of the shell attains 19 mm, its diameter 18 mm. The imperforate, rather thin shell has a conoidal shape. Its apex is subacute . The 5½ whorls are moderately convex, nearly smooth, the upper ones eroded, spirally striate and yellow. The remainder are margined and compressed at the sutures. These are greenish, ornamented with narrow brownish, obliquely radiating, zigzag lines. The body whorl is rounded and is slightly descending. The subovate aperture is sulcate within. The arcuate columella is compressed. The umbilical tract is white and callous.

== Distribution ==
This marine species occurs in the Atlantic Ocean off Angola and Namibia.
