= Diloma samoaense =

Scientific classification
- Kingdom: Animalia
- Phylum: Mollusca
- Class: Gastropoda
- Subclass: Vetigastropoda
- Order: Trochida
- Superfamily: Trochoidea
- Family: Trochidae
- Genus: Diloma
- Species: D. samoaense

Binomial name
- Diloma samoaense Schwabe & Barclay, 2003

Species of gastropod

Diloma Samoaense is a species of sea snail, a marine gastropod mollusk in the family Trochidae, the top snails. Diloma Samoaense got its name from the Samoan islands where it first originated

== Description ==
The size of the shell varies between 8 mm and 11 mm.

== Distribution ==
This marine species occurs off Tutuila, the largest and the main island of American Samoa in the archipelago of Samoan Islands.
