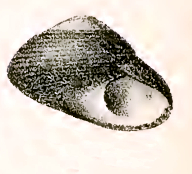
- Drawing of a shell of Diloma coracinum

Scientific classification
- Kingdom: Animalia
- Phylum: Mollusca
- Class: Gastropoda
- Subclass: Vetigastropoda
- Order: Trochida
- Superfamily: Trochoidea
- Family: Trochidae
- Genus: Diloma
- Species: D. coracinum

Binomial name
- Diloma coracinum (Philippi, 1851)

Synonyms
- Trochus coracinus Philippi, 1851; Trochocochlea excavata A. Adams and Angus, 1864

= Diloma coracinum =

Species of gastropod

Diloma coracinum is a species of small sea snail, a marine gastropod mollusc in the family Trochidae, the top snails. The Māori name is māihi.

== Description ==
The height of the shell between 6 mm and 9 mm, its diameter between 8.5 mm and 12 mm. The small, solid, imperforate has a depressed orbicular-conoid shape. It is lustreless. This is a very variable species, and the smallest Diloma occurring in New Zealand.

Sculpture: Rather distant spiral lirae, sometimes obsolete, crossed by oblique growth-lines.

Colour: purplish-black or black, unicoloured, or sparsely dotted, especially on the base, with yellow.

The epidermis is solid, not easily eroded. The spire is low and arched, or conical with rounded apex. The protoconch consists of two flatly convex whorls, which are finely spirally lirate with very distinct oblique growth-lines. The 4 to 5 whorls are slightly convex. The body whorl is large, concave below the suture, obtusely angulate at the periphery and eroded in front of the aperture. The base of the shell is flatly convex. The suture is linear, margined below by a low and rather broad pad. The aperture is very oblique, reddish iridescent and lirate. The outer lip is convex, sharp, black-edged inside, followed by a white opaque band which continues as a pearly stripe over the umbilical tract, parallel to the columella, and connects the terminations of the peristome. The umbilical tract is bounded on the outer lower margin by green, grey, or brown. The operculum is round, light brown, horny, multispiral with a central nucleus.

== Distribution ==
This marine species is endemic to New Zealand and occurs only around the coasts of the two largest main islands, where it is most frequently found on exposed southern or west coast shores.
