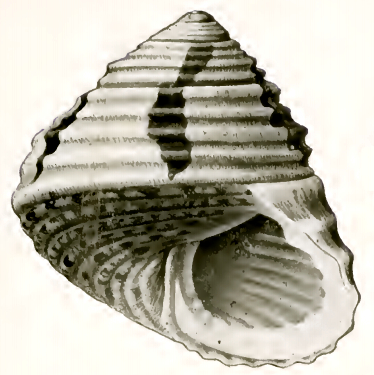
- Original drawing of a shell of Austrocochlea diminuta

Scientific classification
- Kingdom: Animalia
- Phylum: Mollusca
- Class: Gastropoda
- Subclass: Vetigastropoda
- Order: Trochida
- Superfamily: Trochoidea
- Family: Trochidae
- Genus: Austrocochlea
- Species: A. diminuta

Binomial name
- Austrocochlea diminuta (Hedley, 1912)

Synonyms
- Monodonta diminuta Hedley, 1912; Thalotia tricingulata A. Adams, 1853

= Austrocochlea diminuta =

Species of gastropod

Austrocochlea diminuta is a species of sea snail, a marine gastropod mollusk in the family Trochidae, the top snails.

== Description ==
(Original description by Charles Hedley) The height of the shell attains 7 mm, its diameter also 7 mm. The small, solid shell has an ovate-turbinate shape. It is dull and rough. The 5½ whorls are separated by impressed sutures. The colour of the shell is very variable: entire maroon or entire slate or either with broad radiating stripes of buff, or the spiials articulated with buff on a maroon or slate ground, or combinations of these. The nacre of the interior of the aperture is bordered with emerald.

Sculpture: the shell contains elevated spiral ridges, four or five on the upper whorls, about sixteen on the last, andsmaller and closer on the base. Both ridges and interstices are obliquely crossed by fine growth striae. The aperture is subquadrate, brilliantly nacreous with a narrow border. The base of the columella is externally expanded, internally bearing three small tubercles. The throat contains about seven entering ridges which commence at the bevel within the lip. The body whorl has a slight smear of callus.

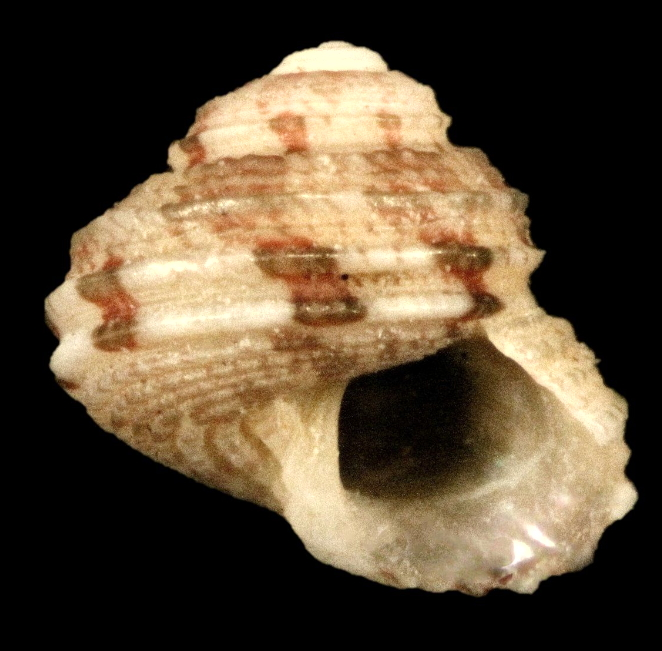
Austrochochlea diminuta

== Distribution ==
This marine species is endemic to Australia and occurs off Northern Territory, Queensland and Western Australia.
