= Diloma nanum =

Scientific classification
- Kingdom: Animalia
- Phylum: Mollusca
- Class: Gastropoda
- Subclass: Vetigastropoda
- Order: Trochida
- Superfamily: Trochoidea
- Family: Trochidae
- Genus: Diloma
- Species: D. nanum

Binomial name
- Diloma nanum Gould, 1861

Species of gastropod

Diloma nanum is a species of sea snail, a marine gastropod mollusk in the family Trochidae, the top snails.

== Description ==
The small, solid, brown shell has an oval-round shape with a diameter of 5 mm. It contains four convex, very distinct whorls. The apex is simple. The light-colored base of the shell is rounded and hardly perforated. The umbilicus is rather large and plicate-crenulate. The arcuate columella is denticulate. The inner lip is undulate. The throat is livid.

== Distribution ==
This marine species occurs off the Ryukyu Islands
