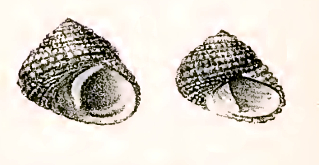
- Drawing with two views of a shell of Diloma radula

Scientific classification
- Kingdom: Animalia
- Phylum: Mollusca
- Class: Gastropoda
- Subclass: Vetigastropoda
- Order: Trochida
- Superfamily: Trochoidea
- Family: Trochidae
- Genus: Diloma
- Species: D. radula

Binomial name
- Diloma radula (Philippi, 1849)

Synonyms
- Trochus radula (Parreyss in Philippi 1848); Monodonta radula (Philippi, 1849)

= Diloma radula =

Species of gastropod

Diloma radula is a species of sea snail, a marine gastropod mollusk in the family Trochidae, the top snails.

== Description ==
The size of the shell varies between 5 mm and 12 mm. The imperforate, small, thick and solid shell has a globose-conic shape. It is blackish and unicolored. The conical spire is elevated or rather depressed. The acute apex is flesh colored. The five whorls are slightly convex. They are spirally encircled by regularly granose subequal lirae. These number about 6 on the penultimate whorl, 11 to 13 on the last whorl. The body whorl is globose, convex below and has a rounded periphery. The aperture is rounded. The outer lip is slightly crenated by the spiral ribs, dark-margined, and beveled to an edge. It is thickened by a heavy white rim inside, which is slightly notched at the periphery, but elsewhere is smooth. The columella is oblique, straightened, not obviously dentate.

== Distribution ==
This marine species occurs in the Indo-Pacific.
