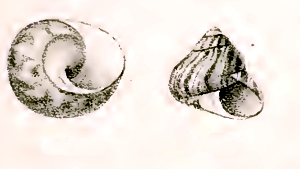
- Drawing with two views of a shell of Oxystele tabularis

Scientific classification
- Kingdom: Animalia
- Phylum: Mollusca
- Class: Gastropoda
- Subclass: Vetigastropoda
- Order: Trochida
- Family: Trochidae
- Genus: Oxystele
- Species: O. tabularis

Binomial name
- Oxystele tabularis (Krauss, 1848)

Synonyms
- Diloma tabularis (Krauss, 1848); Trochus tabularis Krauss, 1848

= Oxystele tabularis =

Species of gastropod

Oxystele tabularis is a species of sea snail, a marine gastropod mollusk in the family Trochidae, the top snails.

== Description ==
The length of the varies between 12 mm and 30 mm. The small, imperforate, rather solid shell has a conical shape. The coloration consists of rather broad longitudinal stripes of dark olive-green or red, alternating with stripes of bright pink, bordered with lines of delicate green, and frequently veined with the same tint The stripes are continuous from suture to base, or are displaced or interrupted at the periphery These axial zigzag markings on a dark or pale brown background are characteristic. The spire is low-conic The eroded apex is orange-colored. The following whorl, if eroded, shows iridescent blue-green nacre, which is spirally grooved. The about 5 whorls are smooth and rounded when not eroded. The body whorl is obtusely subangulate at the periphery. The base of the shell is rather flattened, radiately striped with red and white, and not eroded. The wide aperture is oblique. The outer lip is acute, edged with alternate green and white, and smooth within. The white, thin columella is arcuate. It is wide, covering the place of the umbilicus with an ivory-white pad, which is closely appressecl to the body whorl.

There is little or no difference between this species and Oxystele variegata except the peculiar color patterns.

== Distribution ==
This species occurs in the Southern Indian Ocean off Mozambique and South Africa.

== Habitat ==
This marine species occurs on eulittoral rocks.
