= Austrocochlea quadrasi =

- Original drawing of a shell of Austrocochlea quadrasi

Scientific classification
- Kingdom: Animalia
- Phylum: Mollusca
- Class: Gastropoda
- Subclass: Vetigastropoda
- Order: Trochida
- Superfamily: Trochoidea
- Family: Trochidae
- Genus: Austrocochlea
- Species: A. quadrasi

Binomial name
- Austrocochlea quadrasi Sowerby III, 1898

Synonyms
- Austrocochlea tricingulata (Adams, A., 1853); Monodonta quadrasi Sowerby, G.B. III, 1898; Monodonta (Austrocochlea) quadrasi Sowerby III, 1898 (original description)

Species of gastropod

Austrocochlea quadrasi a species of small sea snail, a marine gastropod mollusk in the family Trochidae, the top snails.

== Description ==
The size of the adult shell varies between 7 mm and 12 mm. The imperforate shell has a conical shape and consists of five whorls. The sutures are impressed in an irregularly way. It is in appearance somewhat similar to Austrocochlea porcata. The minute tubercles at the base of the callous, slightly oblique columella are rather more conspicuous than in that species. The numerous revolving lirae and the three keels are granulose. The convex base of the shell is strongly ridged and brightly spotted. The aperture is subquadrate. It is silvery white on the inside, and has 7 lirae. The peristome is sharp and maculated.

== Distribution ==
This marine shell occurs off the Philippines.
