= Refuge (ecology) =

Place where an organism is protected from predation

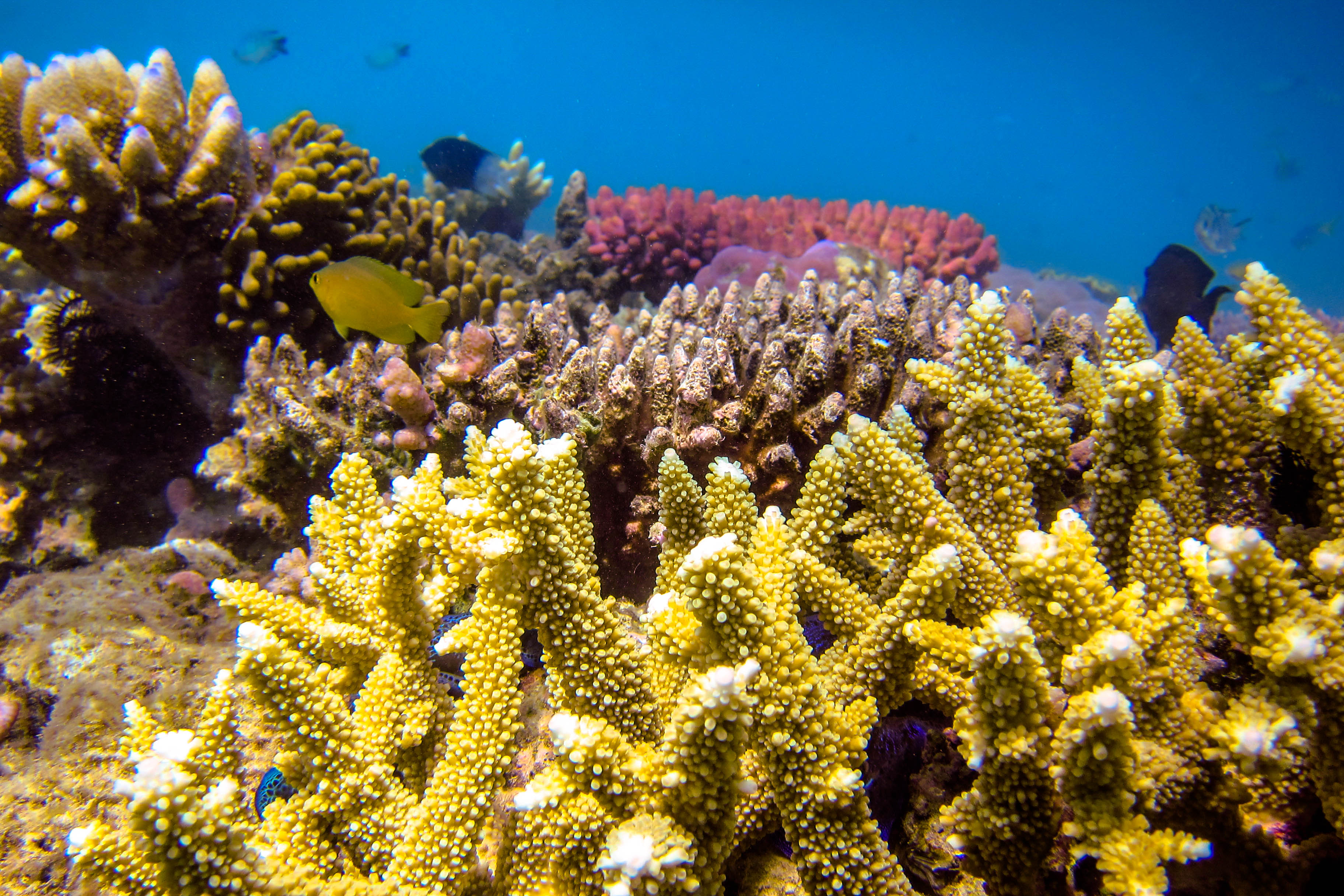
Biodiverse coral reef community

A refuge is a concept in ecology, in which an organism obtains protection from predation by hiding in an area where it is inaccessible or cannot easily be found. Due to population dynamics, when refuges are available, populations of both predators and prey are significantly higher, and significantly more species can be supported in an area.

== Refuges and biodiversity ==
=== Coral reefs ===
Coral reefs provide the most dramatic demonstration of the ecological effects of refuges. Refuge-rich coral reefs contain a full 25% of ocean species, even though such reefs make up just 0.1% of the ocean's surface area. On the other hand, in the sunlight-illuminated open ocean just offshore, there are no places to hide from predation, and both diversity and quantities of organisms per unit area is much lower. Additionally, coral reefs enhance non-local diversity by providing spawning grounds and a refuge habitat for juvenile fishes that will live in the open ocean as adults.

=== Rainforests ===
Rainforest species diversity is also in large part the result of diverse and numerous physical refuges.

== Refuge based on predator exclusion ==
Prey animals typically maintain larger populations when they have a place to physically hide from predation. For example, rats maintain a higher population density if the rats have refuges such as tall grass, allowing them to hide from predators such as owls and cats. Sea birds often have nesting colonies on islands but not on nearby, apparently suitable, mainland sites. The islands lack the mammalian predators found on the mainland, such as cats, dogs, and rats, all of which typically decimate seabird colonies. Semiaquatic animals, e.g. mouse-deer, may use bodies of water as refuges.

Game reserves have been deliberately used to enhance the total population of large game, e.g. deer, for at least a century. Limiting hunting by humans in a relatively small area allows the overall population to rebound. The same principle applies to fisheries, which produce more fish when there is a nearby refuge from human predation in the form of a nature reserve, resulting in higher catches than if the whole area was open to fishing. In human-managed systems like these, heavily hunted areas act as a sink in which animals die faster than they reproduce, but are replaced by animals migrating from the protected nature reserve area.

== Refuge based on migration ==
Many prey animals systematically migrate between refuges and predator-rich feeding grounds, in patterns that minimize their chances of being caught by the predators. The largest such migration by biomass is the oceans' diel vertical migration, in which vast quantities of organisms hide in the lightless depths of the open ocean, arising after dark to consume phytoplankton. This allows them to avoid the large predatory fish of the open ocean, as these predators are primarily visual hunters and need light to effectively catch prey. Similar types of migration also occur in fresh water. For example, small European perch exhibit a daily horizontal migration in some lakes in Finland. During the day they move away from the vegetated areas where the predation threat in the clear water is great, into more turbid open water areas, moving back at night because of the greater availability of zooplankton among the aquatic plants.

== Refuge based on remoteness ==
Refuge use reduces the likelihood of species extinction. There have been a number of mass extinction events. During some of these, denizens of the deep ocean have been relatively immune. The coelacanth for example, is a remnant species of a once common group of fishes, the Sarcopterygii, which disappeared from shallow seas at the time of the Cretaceous–Paleogene extinction event 66 million years ago, leaving only a couple of surviving species. Many coral taxa have used the deep ocean as a refuge, shifting from shallow to deep water and vice versa during their evolutionary history. By developing wings and taking flight, insects exploited the air as a refuge, a place of safety from ground-based predators; this successful evolutionary strategy set the insects on the path to occupying the dominant position they hold today.

Human societies show a similar effect, with remote mountainous regions such as Zomia or the Scottish Highlands serving as refugia, allowing their inhabitants to maintain cultural traditions and languages that were being pushed to extinction in more accessible locations.

== Refuge based on size ==
Refuge from predators often depends on the size of the prey, meaning that individuals under or over a specific size cannot be consumed by the predator.

The small individuals are more likely to be able to tuck themselves away in some hole or cranny, or if, like barnacles, they are living on an exposed surface, are of negligible interest to predators like starfish because of their small size. Another example is the tidepool sculpin, which takes refuge in small rockpools when the tide is out, thus taking advantage of its small size and avoiding its larger fish predators.

Large individuals may escape predators by being too large to be consumed, or their size allowing them to inhabit areas free of predators. Often larger individuals can still be consumed by predators, but the predator will prefer small prey as these require less work (handling) and the predator is less likely to get hurt by small individuals. Leading to a larger return on investment. An example is the rock lobster which can consume large individuals of the pink-lipped topshell, but will preferentially consume small individuals when given the choice. Some barnacles escape predators by settling further up the shore, away from predators. There the starfish cannot reach them when the tide is out, nor can whelks drill through their shells because they remain submerged for insufficient time during each tidal cycle. In this situation, size is a refuge in itself, in that it enables the barnacle to escape desiccation under circumstances that might be lethal to smaller individuals.

== See also ==
- Natural reservoir
- Productivity (ecology)
- Refugium (population biology)
- Source–sink dynamics
