= Diloma durvillaea =

Scientific classification
- Kingdom: Animalia
- Phylum: Mollusca
- Class: Gastropoda
- Subclass: Vetigastropoda
- Order: Trochida
- Superfamily: Trochoidea
- Family: Trochidae
- Genus: Diloma
- Species: D. durvillaea

Binomial name
- Diloma durvillaea Spencer, Marshall & Waters, 2009

Species of gastropod

Diloma durvillaea is a species of sea snail, a marine gastropod mollusk in the family Trochidae, the top snails.

== Description ==
The height of the shell attains 11 mm, its diameter 10 mm.

== Distribution ==
This marine species is endemic to New Zealand and occurs off South Island.
