= Diloma zelandicum =

- Diloma zelandicum

Scientific classification
- Kingdom: Animalia
- Phylum: Mollusca
- Class: Gastropoda
- Subclass: Vetigastropoda
- Order: Trochida
- Superfamily: Trochoidea
- Family: Trochidae
- Genus: Diloma
- Species: D. zelandicum

Binomial name
- Diloma zelandicum (Quoy and Gaimard, 1834)

Synonyms
- Diloma (Fractarmilla) zelandica (Quoy, H.E.T. & J.P. Gaimard, 1834); Monodonta atrovirens Suter, 1913; Monodonta melanoloma guttata Hutton, 1884; Monodonta morio Suter, 1913; Trochus atrovirens Philippi, 1851; Trochus zelandicus Quoy and Gaimard, 1834 (basionym)

Species of gastropod

Diloma zelandicum is a species of sea snail, a marine gastropod mollusc in the family Trochidae, the top snails or top shells.

== Description ==
The height of the shell attains 20 mm, its diameter 25 mm. The imperforate shell is depressed and has an orbiculate-conoidal shape. The six whorls are separated by impressed sutures. The whorls are slightly convex, greenish-black and shining. They are spirally sulcate, the sulci about 5 on the penultimate whorl. The body whorl is much dilated, slightly depressed above, rounded in the middle, very obliquely striate, obsoletely transversely sulcate, slightly convex beneath. The aperture is subrhomboidal and lirate within. The acute lip is green. The basal margin is thickened within. The white columella is compressed and arcuate. The columellar callus is broadly expanded, subdepressed at the place of the umbilicus.

== Distribution ==
This marine species is endemic to New Zealand and occurs off North Island, South Island and Stewart Island. It has also been reported from Tasmania.
