= Austrocochlea brevis =

Scientific classification
- Kingdom: Animalia
- Phylum: Mollusca
- Class: Gastropoda
- Subclass: Vetigastropoda
- Order: Trochida
- Superfamily: Trochoidea
- Family: Trochidae
- Genus: Austrocochlea
- Species: A. brevis

Binomial name
- Austrocochlea brevis Parsons & Ward, 1994

Species of gastropod

Austrocochlea brevis is a species of sea snail, a marine gastropod mollusk in the family Trochidae, the top snails.

== Description ==
The size of the shell varies between 13 mm and 26 mm.

== Distribution ==
This marine shell occurs off Tasmania.
