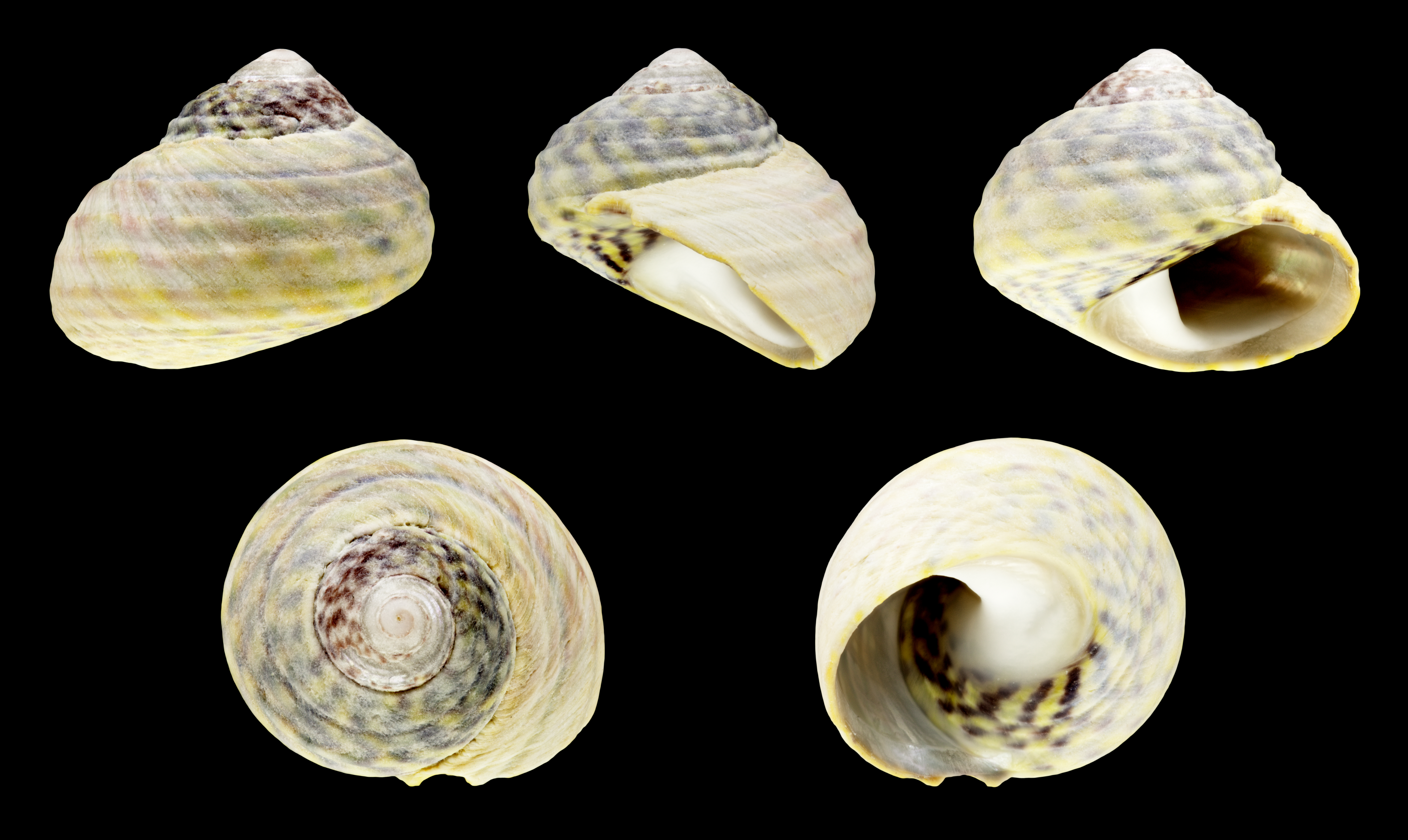

Scientific classification
- Kingdom: Animalia
- Phylum: Mollusca
- Class: Gastropoda
- Subclass: Vetigastropoda
- Order: Trochida
- Superfamily: Trochoidea
- Family: Trochidae
- Genus: Diloma
- Species: D. subrostratum

Binomial name
- Diloma subrostratum (Gray, 1835)

Synonyms
- Chlorostoma undulosum A. Adams, 1853; Diloma (Fractarmilla) subrostrata subrostrata (Gray, J.E. in Yate, 1835); Diloma plumbera Hutton, 1882; Diloma subrostratum novaezelandiae (Anton, 1838); Diloma subrostratum subrostratum (J. E. Gray, 1835); Labio corrosa A. Adams, 1853; Labio hectori Hutton, 1873; Labio pica A. Adams, 1853; Monodonta subrostrata Gray, 1835; Trochus attritus Hombron, and Jacquinot, 1854; Trochus novaezelandiae Anton, 1838; Zediloma (Fractarmilla) corrosa (A. Adams, 1853); Zediloma (Fractarmilla) corrosa zebrina A. W. B. Powell, 1946

= Diloma subrostratum =

Species of gastropod

Diloma subrostratum, common name the mudflat top shell, is a species of small sea snail, a marine gastropod mollusk in the family Trochidae, the top snails.

== Description ==
The length of the adult shell of this species varies between 11 mm and 32 mm. The solid, conical shell is suborbicular. It is often more or less black, with close wavy longitudinal yellow lines. The spire is short with five whorls. The last whorl is large, rounded, with its hinder part with three to six spiral keels. The axis is imperforated. The inside of the aperture is smooth and silvery.

== Distribution ==
This common estuarine species is endemic to New Zealand, occurring in the North and South Islands, and in Stewart Island.
