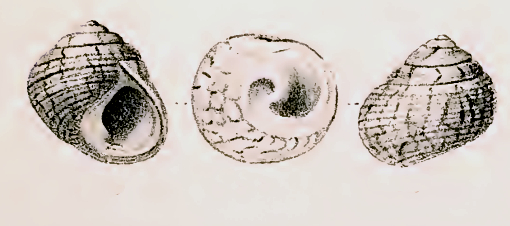
- Drawing with three views of a shell of Austrocochlea zeus

Scientific classification
- Kingdom: Animalia
- Phylum: Mollusca
- Class: Gastropoda
- Subclass: Vetigastropoda
- Order: Trochida
- Superfamily: Trochoidea
- Family: Trochidae
- Genus: Austrocochlea
- Species: A. zeus

Binomial name
- Austrocochlea zeus (P. Fischer, 1874)

Synonyms
- Trochus (Monodonta) zeus P. Fischer, 1874

= Austrocochlea zeus =

Species of gastropod

Austrocochlea zeus, common name the dory austrocochlea, is a species of sea snail, a marine gastropod mollusk in the family Trochidae, the top snails.

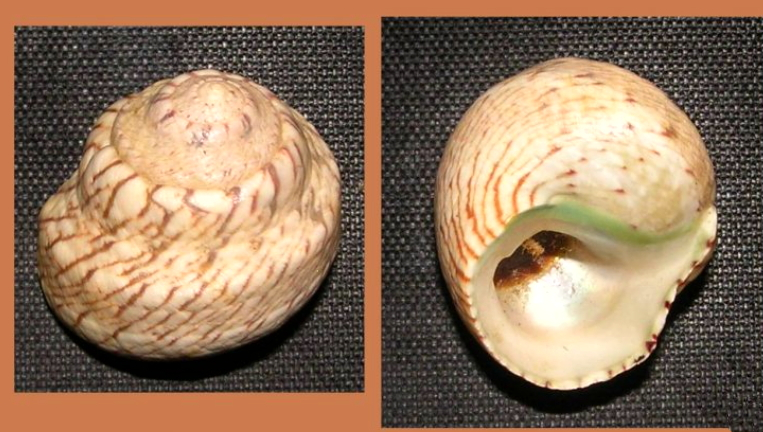
Austrocochlea zeus

== Description ==
The height of the shell attains 16 mm, its diameter 19 mm.

The thick, obtuse shell is imperforate. The apex is short, papillose and yellowish. The suture is impressed. The 4 to 5 whorls are moderately convex. They are obliquely striate and spirally sulcate. The body whorl is ample, rounded, obsoletely angulated above and marginated at the suture. It is white, with radiating flexuous red lines. The base of the shell is convex. The aperture is circular. The columella is subdentate at its base. The thick columellar calluses whitish-green. The outer lip is thick.

== Distribution ==
This species is endemic to Australia and occurs off Western Australia.
