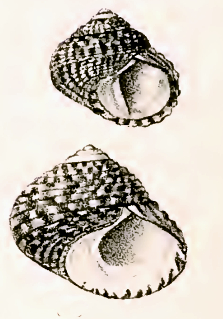
- Drawing with two views of a shell of Diloma concameratum

Scientific classification
- Kingdom: Animalia
- Phylum: Mollusca
- Class: Gastropoda
- Subclass: Vetigastropoda
- Order: Trochida
- Superfamily: Trochoidea
- Family: Trochidae
- Genus: Diloma
- Species: D. concameratum

Binomial name
- Diloma concameratum (Wood, 1828)

Synonyms
- Austrocochlea concamerata (Wood, 1828); Austrocochlea (Fractarmilla) concamerata (Wood, 1828); Fractarmilla concamerata (Wood, 1828); Labio fuliginea A. Adams, 1853; Monodonta concamerata (Wood, 1828) Hedley, C. 1917; Monodonta (Diloma) striolata (Quoy & Gaimard, 1834); Monodonta (Melagraphia) striolata (Quoy & Gaimard, 1834); Monodonta striolata (Quoy & Gaimard, 1834); Monodonta viridis (Wood, 1828); Trochocochlea concamerata (Wood, 1828); Trochocochlea striolata (Quoy & Gaimard, 1834); Trochus aethiops Philippi, 1845; Trochus concameratus W. Wood, 1828; Trochus fuligineus (A. Adams, 1853); Trochus reticulatus Forbes, 1852; Trochus striolatus Quoy & Gaimard, 1834; Trochus viridus Wood, 1828; Trochus (Trochoconchlea) fuligineus (A. Adams, 1853)

= Diloma concameratum =

Species of gastropod

Diloma concameratum, common name the speckled periwinkle, is a species of sea snail, a marine gastropod mollusk in the family Trochidae, the top snails.

== Description ==
The height of the shell varies between 15 mm and 27 mm, the diameter between 23 mm and 25 mm. The very thick and solid, imperforate shell has a globose-conical shape and is generally rather depressed. Its color is yellow and black, tessellated or longitudinally striped, sometimes the black, sometimes the yellow predominating. The spire is a very short cone. The apex is usually perfect and acute, often ruddy. The five whorls are slightly convex. The increase very rapidly in size. They are spirally strongly costate, the ridges 13 or 14 in number on the last whorl . The body whorl slightly descends at the aperture and is not eroded on the base. The large aperture is oblique. The outer lip is margined within with yellow and black, followed by a nacreous and then by an opaque white thickening which more or less contracts the aperture and which is more or less notched at about the place of the periphery. The columella is white, much narrower than in Diloma aethiops. It is bidenticulate below.

The more prominent characters of this species are the strong spiral ribs and the thick outer layer of yellow and purplish-black, or of black veined with yellow, which usually assumes a tessellated pattern. Sometimes, however, the black predominates to the almost entire exclusion of yellow, and specimens also occur in which the black is scarcely visible on the surface.

== Distribution ==
This marine species is endemic to Australia and occurs off New South Wales, South Australia, Tasmania, Victoria and Western Australia
