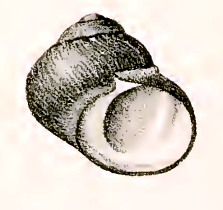
- Drawing of a shell of Diloma nigerrimum

Scientific classification
- Kingdom: Animalia
- Phylum: Mollusca
- Class: Gastropoda
- Subclass: Vetigastropoda
- Order: Trochida
- Superfamily: Trochoidea
- Family: Trochidae
- Genus: Diloma
- Species: D. nigerrimum

Binomial name
- Diloma nigerrimum (Gmelin, 1791)

Synonyms
- Monodonta nigerrima (Gmelin, 1791); Trochus araucanus d'Orbigny; Trochus gaudichaudi Hupé, 1854; Turbo nigerrimus Gmelin, 1791 (original combination); Turbo quoyi Kiener; Zediloma digna Finlay, 1926

= Diloma nigerrimum =

Species of gastropod

The bluish top shell (Diloma nigerrimum) is a species of small sea snail, a marine gastropod, in the family Trochidae, the top snails.

== Description ==
The height of the shell is 24 mm, its diameter 26 mm. The solid, black, imperforate shell is depressed and has a globose shape. Its sculpture consists of numerous close spiral striae, sometimes nearly obsolete. These are crossed by oblique growth lines, which, are often strongly developed. The colour of the shell is bluish-black or black. Beach-worn specimens may be reddish or brownish. It has no spots. The epidermis is fairly thick and solid, shining in fresh specimens. The spire is short, conoidal to conical. The apex is rounded or acute. The protoconch consists of two spirally striate and lightly pearly whorls, sometimes reddish. The 4 to 5 whorls are slightly convex and rapidly increase in size. The body whorl is usually depressed or subconcave below the suture. The base of the shell is rounded, eroded and iridescent in front of the aperture. The suture is linear, margined below by a strong cord. The large aperture is oblique, greenish iridescent, and closely lirate. The outer lip is convex, rather thin and sharp, bordered within by an extremely narrow black margin, followed by a broad opaque white band, sometimes brilliantly iridescent. The columella is concave, obsoletely subdentate below, very broad and flattened or excavated on the face. It is composed principally of an opaque white layer, which also lines the base, but does not extend to the edge of the lip. The parietal wall has a band of nacre, uniting the ends of the peristome. It is bounded on the outside with light brown or white.

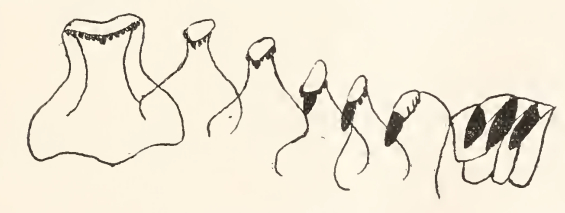
Radula of a New Zealand specimen

Although the dentition of the New Zealand morph is quite different from that of the South American D. nigerrima morph, genetic analysis shows that they belong to the same species.

== Distribution ==
This marine species is endemic to New Zealand and the west coast of South America.
