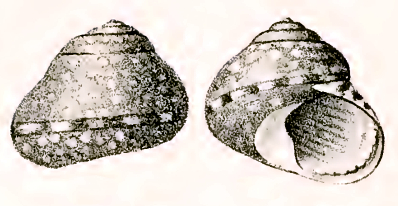
- Drawing with two views of a shell of Diloma piperinum

Scientific classification
- Kingdom: Animalia
- Phylum: Mollusca
- Class: Gastropoda
- Subclass: Vetigastropoda
- Order: Trochida
- Superfamily: Trochoidea
- Family: Trochidae
- Genus: Diloma
- Species: D. piperinum

Binomial name
- Diloma piperinum (Philippi, 1849)

Synonyms
- Austrocochlea piperina (Philippi, 1849); Monodonta piperina (Philippi, 1849); Trochus piperinus Philippi, 1849

= Diloma piperinum =

Species of gastropod

Diloma piperinum is a species of sea snail, a marine gastropod mollusk in the family Trochidae, the top snails.

== Description ==
The height of the shell attains 8 mm, its diameter 7.5 mm. The small, imperforate, thick, solid shell has a globose-conic shape. It is blackish, speckled and maculated all over with yellowish. The body whorl is spirally encircled by two narrow bands of black articulated with orange. The short spire is generally eroded more or less. The apex is acute or eroded. The 4 to 5 whorls are slightly convex, spirally finely striate, the striae often almost obsolete. The aperture is rounded. The acute outer lip is arcuate, thickened within, the nacre inside appearing finely lirate . The columella is short, oblique, not as wide as usual in this group, quite obviously bluntly toothed in the middle.

== Distribution ==
This marine species occurs off Hawaii, Fiji and Taiwan.
