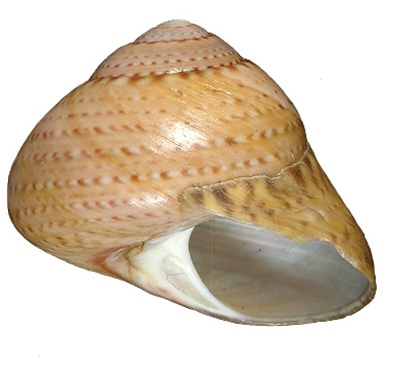
- Oxystele impervia

Scientific classification
- Kingdom: Animalia
- Phylum: Mollusca
- Class: Gastropoda
- Subclass: Vetigastropoda
- Order: Trochida
- Superfamily: Trochoidea
- Family: Trochidae
- Genus: Oxystele
- Species: O. impervia

Binomial name
- Oxystele impervia (Menke, 1843)

Synonyms
- Diloma impervia (Menke, 1843); Monodonta sagittifera Lamarck; Trochus impervius Menke, 1843; Trochus perdix Koch in Philippi; Trochus sagittiferus Lamarck; Trochus variegatus Anton

= Oxystele impervia =

Species of gastropod

Oxystele impervia is a species of sea snail, a marine gastropod mollusk in the family Trochidae, the top snails.

== Description ==
The size of the shell varies between 12 mm and 18 mm. The imperforate, rather thin shell has a conoidal shape. Its ground color is (usually) whitish, pinkish or bluish, painted with red, brown or blackish in innumerable patterns, but usually in one of the following modes :

- longitudinal zigzag dark stripes on a light clear ground
- very obliquely descending narrow stripes or lines, generally zigzag or interrupted about the middle of the whorl
- narrow spiral articulated bands around the middle of the whorl, the base mottled or barred, and the suture bordered by a row of dark blotches
- ground-color pink or purplish, the entire surface variegated by rather narrow spiral bands, finely articulated with red or purple and white

The elevated spire is conical. The sutures are distinctly impressed. The apex is minute and acute when not eroded. The 6 whorls are convex, quite smooth outside, but when eroded the nacre is seen to be finely spirally lirate. The base of the shell is not eroded. The aperture is very oblique. The acute outer lip is narrowly margined, iridescent within, the nacre smooth, but apparently lirate. The white, thin columella is arcuate, concave. It covers the place of the umbilicus with a pad of callus, the outer edge of which is usually not appressed closely to the base. The parietal wall contains a thin translucent callus or none. The umbilico-columellar callus is bounded outside by a more or less obvious streak of blue, green, brown, or sometimes light yellowish.

== Distribution ==
This marine species occurs off the southern Atlantic coast of South Africa.
