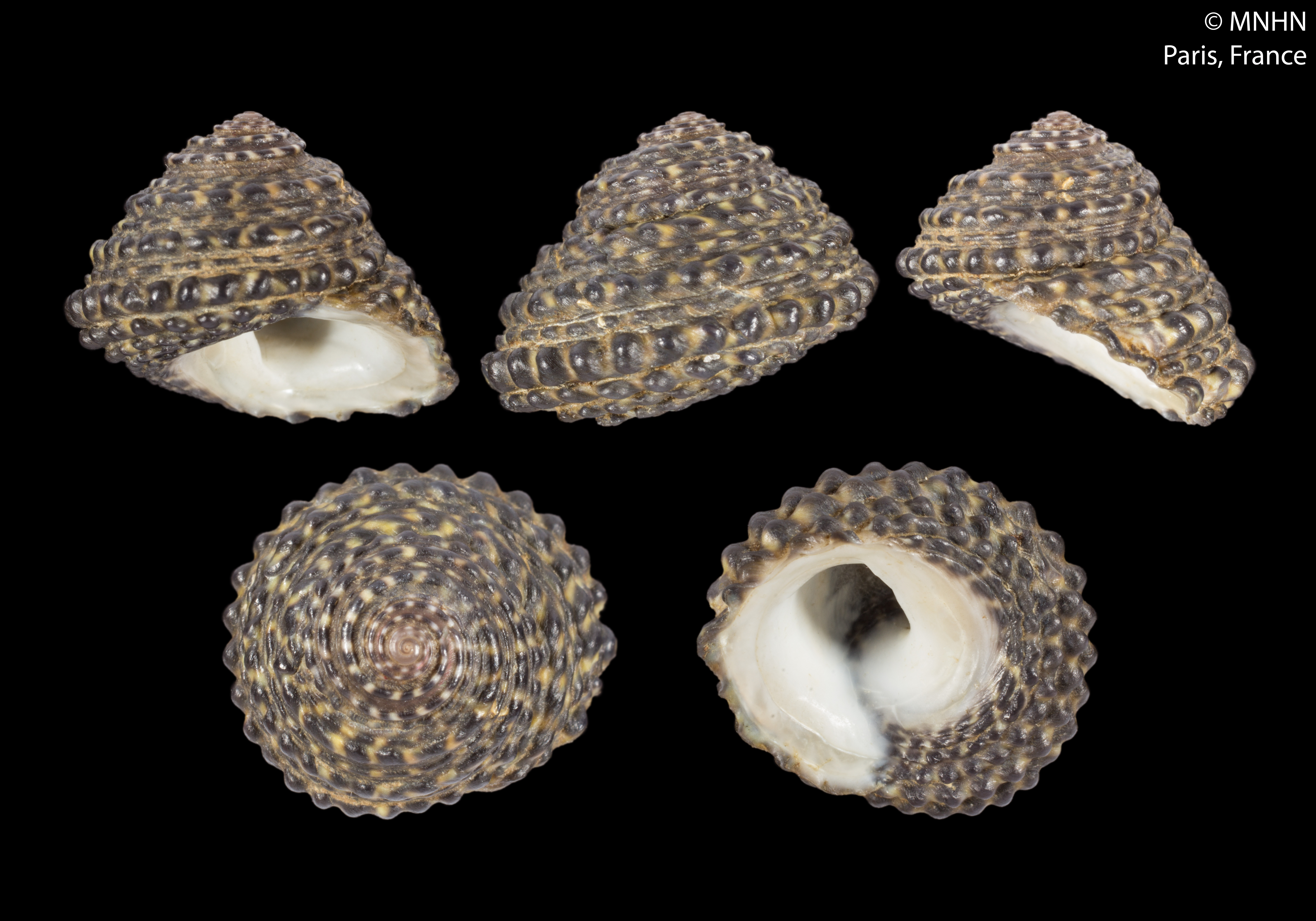

Scientific classification
- Kingdom: Animalia
- Phylum: Mollusca
- Class: Gastropoda
- Subclass: Vetigastropoda
- Order: Trochida
- Superfamily: Trochoidea
- Family: Trochidae
- Genus: Diloma
- Species: D. bicanaliculatum

Binomial name
- Diloma bicanaliculatum (Dunker, 1844)

Synonyms
- Diloma (Fractarmilla) lenior Finlay, H.J., 1927; Trochus bicanaliculatus Dunker in Philippi, 1844 (original combination)

= Diloma bicanaliculatum =

Species of gastropod

Diloma bicanaliculatum, common name the knobbed top shell, is a species of small sea snail, a marine gastropod mollusk, in the family Trochidae, the top snails. The size of the shell varies between 10 mm and 20 mm.

== Distribution ==
This marine shell is endemic to New Zealand and occurs off North Island, South Island and Stewart Island. A subspecies, Diloma bicanaliculata Lenoir, was once used for specimens between Cook Strait and Stewart Island. The subspecies is not listed on the World Register of Marine Species, so it may no longer be valid.
