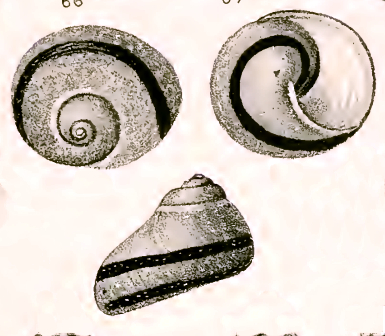
- Drawing with three views of a shell of Austrocochlea constellata

Scientific classification
- Kingdom: Animalia
- Phylum: Mollusca
- Class: Gastropoda
- Subclass: Vetigastropoda
- Order: Trochida
- Superfamily: Trochoidea
- Family: Trochidae
- Genus: Austrocochlea
- Species: A. constellata

Binomial name
- Austrocochlea constellata Souverbie, 1863

Synonyms
- Austrocochlea constellatus (Souverbie, S.M. in Souverbie, S.M. & R.P. Montrouzier, 1863); Diloma constellatum Souverbie, 1863; Monodonta constellata (Souverbie, 1863); Trochus constellatus Souverbie, 1863 (original combination)

= Austrocochlea constellata =

Species of gastropod

Austrocochlea constellata is a species of sea snail, a marine gastropod mollusk in the family Trochidae, the top snails.

This is a species inquirenda.

== Description ==
The height of the shell attains 9 mm, its diameter 10 mm. The oblique, imperforate shell has an orbiculate-conic shape and is slightly elevated. The base of the shell is very wide. The shell is longitudinally very obliquely subtly striate, and marked with a few spiral subimpressed lines which are sometimes obsolete, leaving the surface smooth. The color is plumbeous ashen, often with a pink tinge, speckled closely with white dots, and encircled with two dark bands which are articulated with larger spots of white. The sutures are impressed. The five whorls are subconvex, the last forming the greater portion of the shell. They are compressed, obtusely angulated, depressed below the suture. The surface of the base is almost entirely occupied by the parieto-columellar area. The very oblique aperture is pearly and iridescent inside. The thin outer lip acute, and continued on the base in an angle which bounds the columellar area. The thin, white columella is subhorizontal, very wide, subconcave, and bounded by a narrow brown streak outside.

There is considerable variation in the color pattern. Unlike most of the species in this genus, the base is not lined with a white thickened continuation of the columella.

== Distribution ==
This marine species occurs off New Caledonia.
