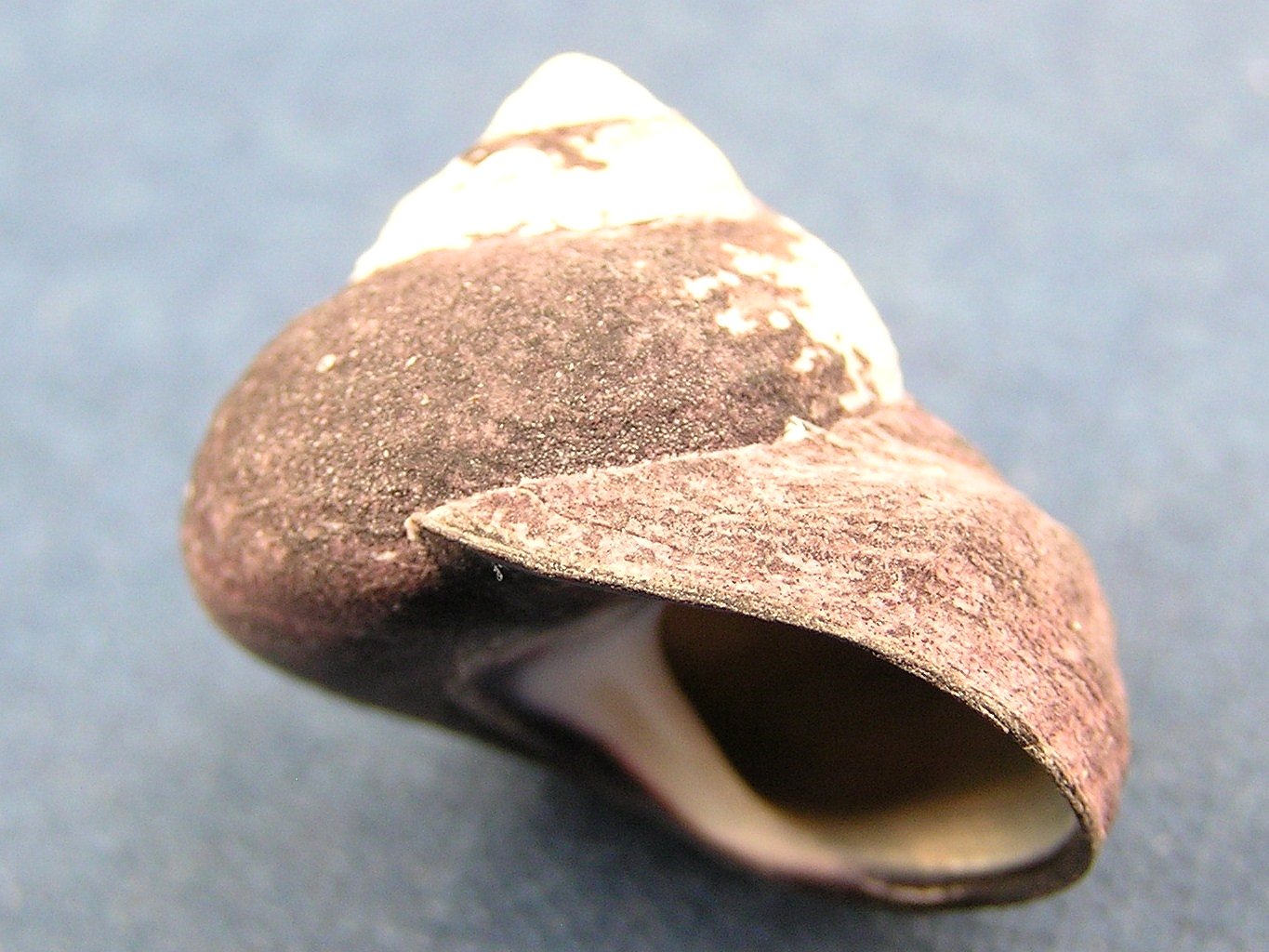
- Oxystele tigrina

Scientific classification
- Kingdom: Animalia
- Phylum: Mollusca
- Class: Gastropoda
- Subclass: Vetigastropoda
- Order: Trochida
- Family: Trochidae
- Genus: Oxystele
- Species: O. tigrina

Binomial name
- Oxystele tigrina (Anton, 1839)

Synonyms
- Diloma (Oxystele) tigrina (Anton, H.E., 1839)); Monodonta tigrinus Odhner, 1923; Oxystele sagittifera var. perdix Koch in Turton, 1932; Oxystele tigrinus Turton 1932; Trochus tigrinus Anton, 1839 (original description)

= Oxystele tigrina =

Species of gastropod

Oxystele tigrina, common name the tiger top shell, is a species of sea snail, a marine gastropod mollusk in the family Trochidae, the top snails.

== Description ==
The size of an adult shell varies between 25 mm and 43 mm. The more or less elevated, imperforate shell has a conoidal shape. It is lusterless blackish or purplish, unicolored or with a few scattered white dots, or yellowish flexiious lines. The yellow or whitish, apical whorls are eroded. The about 6 whorls are spirally coarsely but obsoletely lirate. The large aperture lis oblique with a black border and is silvery within. The simple columella is white or yellowish, bordered by a dull purplish streak. The parietal wall is usually covered by a thin silvery callus.

== Distribution ==
This marine species occurs along Namibia and the south coast of South Africa.
