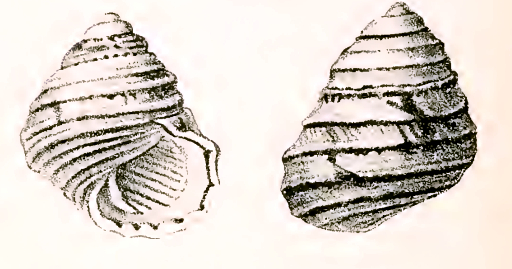
- Drawing with two views of a shell of Austrocochlea constricta

Scientific classification
- Kingdom: Animalia
- Phylum: Mollusca
- Class: Gastropoda
- Subclass: Vetigastropoda
- Order: Trochida
- Superfamily: Trochoidea
- Family: Trochidae
- Genus: Austrocochlea
- Species: A. constricta

Binomial name
- Austrocochlea constricta (Lamarck, 1822)

Synonyms
- Austrocochlea obtusa Iredale, T. & McMichael, D.F. 1962; Austrocochlea porcata Iredale, T. & McMichael, D.F. 1962; Austrocochlea torri Cotton & Godfrey, 1934; Labio porcata Adams, 1853; Monodonta constricta Lamarck, 1822; Monodonta zebra Menke, 1829; Trochocochlea extenuatus Fischer, 1878; Trochococlea multicarinata Chenu, 1859; Trochus conctrictus (Lamarck, 1822); Trochus obtusa Dillwyn, 1817; Trochus obtusus Hedley, C. 1917; Trochus taeniatus Quoy & Gaimard, 1834

= Austrocochlea constricta =

Species of gastropod

Austrocochlea constricta, common names the southern periwinkle, common periwinkle, or ribbon monodonta, is a species of sea snail, a marine gastropod mollusk in the family Trochidae, the top snails.

== Description ==
The height of the shell varies between 15 mm and 32 mm, its diameter between 22 mm and 28 mm. The thick, solid shell is imperforate. Its color is a lusterless ashen or whitish, obscurely marked with black zigzag lines and stripes, or with spiral articulated zones or with spiral stripes of black. Sometimes it is nearly unicolored. The spire is conical with an acute apex. The about five whorls are convex. The first one is eroded, the penultimate is very strongly spirally tricostate. The body whorl has about seven strong carinae. The aperture is oblique. The outer and basal lips are either thick and multilirate within, or rather thin and slightly furrowed at the places of the principal carinae. The short columella is oblique, subdentate at its base and at the insertion spreading in a strong callus upon the parietal wall.

== Distribution ==
This marine species is endemic to Australia and occurs off New South Wales, South Australia, Tasmania, Victoria and Western Australia
