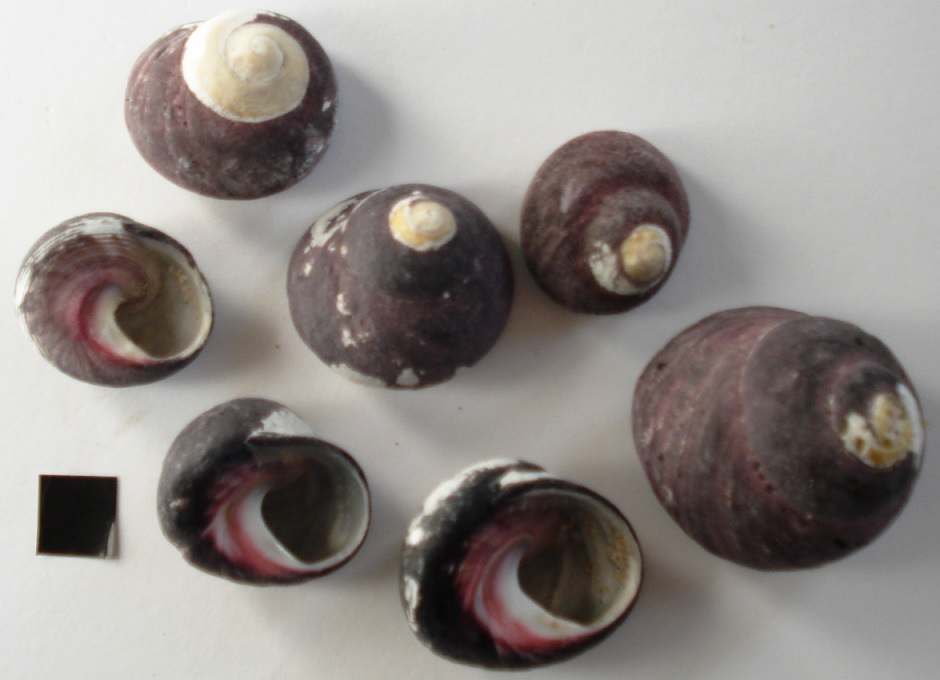

Scientific classification
- Kingdom: Animalia
- Phylum: Mollusca
- Class: Gastropoda
- Subclass: Vetigastropoda
- Order: Trochida
- Family: Trochidae
- Genus: Oxystele
- Species: O. sinensis

Binomial name
- Oxystele sinensis (Gmelin, 1791)

Synonyms
- Diloma sinensis (Gmelin, 1791); Oxystele inflata W. H. Turton, 1932; Oxystele merula (Röding, 1978); Trochus merula (Röding, 1798) ·; Trochus meruloides Krauss, 1848; Trochus sinensis Gmelin, 1791; Turbo merula Röding, 1798

= Oxystele sinensis =

Species of gastropod

The pink-lipped topshell (Oxystele sinensis) also known as the rosy-base topsnail, is a species of sea snail, a marine gastropod mollusk in the family Trochidae, the top snails.

== Description ==
The pink-lipped topshell has monomorphic purplish-black shell with a crimson inner lip. The length of the adult shell is between 18 mm and 51 mm.

== Distribution ==
This marine species occurs from False Bay to South Transkei near the Mbashe River, South Africa.

== Ecology ==
Especially small individuals of this species that live in the intertidal zone are predated upon by rock lobsters. Larger individuals largely escape this predator by migrating to deeper waters, where they find a size refuge.
