= Examples of ice age refugia =

A variety of glacial refugia have been identified that have allowed animal and plant populations to persist during ice age periods and re-colonize wider areas during post-glacial periods.

== Background ==
The northern and southern hemispheres of the earth have a dynamic history of advancing and retreating ice sheets. The glacial and interglacial periods are linked to regular eccentricities in the Earth's orbit and correspond to approximately 100 kyr cycles. The advancing, or glacial periods can cause a massive displacement of flora and fauna as it drives them away from the poles, with the most recent glacial maximum having occurred about 20,000 years ago., Refugia may allow the persistence of populations and subsequent-recolonization. Some different types of these areas are coastal, embedded, and periglacial refugia. Coastal refugia are locations of refuge located on uncovered coastal regions or islands. Due to a lower sea level during the last glacial period, it is suspected that the exposed continental shelf played a large role in acting as a refugium to many different organisms as well as potential route for migration. Periglacial refers to refugia located adjacent to a glacier or an ice sheet. Embedded refugia are areas that remained uncovered within the limit of the glacial advance (hot springs or nunataks).

== Effects of ice age on Northern and Southern Hemispheres ==
In the northern hemisphere, the last glacial maximum reached about 40˚ N in North America, covering the Great Lakes. In Scandinavia, it extended down to about 52˚ N, affecting parts of Britain and the northern regions of Europe. The majority of the ice coverage was over land, allowing for major retreat during glacial periods. There are some areas on the west coast of Alaska and British Columbia that are projected as coastal refugia for organisms. There is also a potential refugium in the far north of Scandinavia on the island of Andøya.

In the southern hemisphere, the majority of the ice coverage was over the ocean with some glaciation present on South America and New Zealand. While this glaciation wasn't as extensive as that of the northern latitudes, the climate was still affected. As a result of the glacial advance, biota retreated north to warmer regions and east over the Andes to avoid the Patagonian ice sheet. Also, many mobile marine fauna migrated north to some of the surrounding islands, out of reach of the oceanic ice sheet. In addition to periglacial and coastal refugia, there were also possible areas of embedded refugia in Patagonia and New Zealand.

== Southern Hemisphere ==
=== South America ===
As the LGM ice sheet crept along the west coast of South America, it drove the previous inhabitants north and east. The northern traveling flora and fauna established in the warmer, coastal regions of Chile, out of reach of the ice that stretched up to 40˚ S latitude. Those that moved east jumped the Andes and established themselves in periglacial refugia on the eastern slopes, or further down in the more low-lying areas of Argentina that remained unaffected by the ice retreat. Additionally, there were areas of embedded refugia that may have allowed for habitation by freshwater crabs, fish, and even otters.

The freshwater crabs (Aegla alacalufi) were suspected to have survived in hot springs, which may have kept the ice from forming in that area. The fish, Galaxias platei, were thought to have survived not only in eastern refugia over the Andes, but also in isolated proglacial lakes in the northernmost portions of Patagonia. This was inferred by the genetic lineages suggesting a larger group to the east of the Andes and smaller more isolated groups to the west of the Andes during the LGM.

As good food sources for the Patagonian otter (Lontra provocax), the Galaxias platei and the Aegla alacalufi may have played a part in sustaining this aquatic mammal during this glacial period. Today, this otter is found throughout Southern Argentina and Chile and is found as far north as 39˚S. During the LGM, most of its habitat was covered by ice. DNA testing of L. provocax in the Patagonian area has shown potential embedded refugia in the southern coastal region, with intertidal crustaceans in addition to other embedded aquatic life as possible food sources.

=== New Zealand ===
Evidence of a possible refugium for forest habitat was found in the northern, glacially-affected Howard Valley, situated on the South Island of New Zealand. This location consists of high peaks and deep U-shaped valleys. Today it is characterized by grassland valley floor and forested slopes. Glacial advances in this area occurred around 28000, 21500, and 19000 years BP (before present).

The deep valleys found in this location may have acted as microclimates that sheltered the trees from glacial conditions and climate. Pollen studies show that these valleys consisted mostly of grasses and shrubs around 25,000–22,000 years BP. A low occurrence of beech (Nothofagus menziesii) pollen (dated to 25,742–22,988 years BP) suggests a refugium in this area. Another line of evidence was found in the fossilized remains of ground beetles dating back to 25,742–22,988 years BP. Because these beetles are normally associated with tree line habitats, their location suggests an altitudinal tree limit during the glacial period. Based on these lines of evidence, beech forest may have been more common in lower elevation areas of the Howard Valley during periods of glacial advance.

=== Sub-Antarctic island refugia ===
The many islands surrounding Antarctica may have played large roles in the survival of marine life during the LGM. With the extent of the ice sheet from the coasts of the Antarctic continent, only the most mobile of fauna were able to retreat north.

In the case of petrels and other flying seabirds, the ability to nest on nunataks may have allowed them the ability to stay on the continent during the glacial period and fly down to the edge of the ice for food. However, this was most likely not the case with colony forming species such as the Adélie penguin and the Antarctic elephant seal.

The Antarctic elephant seal was likely a resident of the Antarctic continent (Victoria Land) 7,500–8,000 years ago. However, an advance of ice 1000 years ago drove them away to the more northern Macquarie Island. With evidence of such a large migration route, Macquarie and other similar islands likely acted as refugia for elephant seals as well as other marine life during the LGM as they moved to areas unaffected by the ice.

An example of this is the Adélie penguin, which is widespread on the islands surrounding Antarctica. Genetic evidence suggests that the modern Adélie penguin has stemmed from two different lineages. This postulates two island refugia during the LGM.

== Northern Hemisphere ==
=== Alexander Archipelago ===
The islands of the Alexander Archipelago make up a large part of Alaska's panhandle. It is host to over 2000 islands, some with mountains exceeding 1000 meters in elevation. These higher peaks still support remnants of the ice age: snowfields and small glaciers. During the glacial period, glacier formation was accompanied by a lowering in the sea level, which likely helped expose the now submerged continental shelf. While the majority of the Archipelago was covered in ice, these outer coast areas where continental shelf was exposed were very likely coastal refugia for a variety of plants and animals. Examples of these spots include Baranof Island, which has a lack of glacial evidence on its southern end, suggesting lack of coverage during the LGM. Also, Coronation Island seems to have relatively minor glaciation. In support of possible refugia, a brown bear skeleton was found on Coronation dating back to 11630 years BP. This may show that there was a refugium nearby that this bear could have traveled from. It may also indicate that Coronation was a refugium that provided a food source for the bear.

On both of the outer islands, Baranof and Coronation, there are high levels of endemic mammalian species. This is true of Chichagof, Forrester, and Warren islands as well; all three of which help make up the furthest extent of the Alexander Archipelago. These regions of endemism have been interpreted as possible coastal refugia.

An example of this endemism is found when looking at brown bears in the Alexander Archipelago. These bears exhibit a lower genetic diversity than bears found inland. Additionally, genetic tests have shown them to be more closely related to present-day polar bears than mainland bears. This evidence suggests that they may have inhabited the Archipelago for at least 40,000 years, with habitable refugia existent throughout this time.

Another species that might have made use of refugia during this time is the Chum salmon. It appears that the different groups of salmon that spawn on the Prince of Wales Island are more similar to one another than they are to salmon elsewhere in SE Alaska. This has been interpreted as meaning that Prince of Wales Island is the source of present-day Chum salmon, whose Wisconsin Glaciation may have been spent living in streams on the exposed continental shelf.

There has also been possible evidence of flora in refugia. Analysis of pollen deposits on Pleasant Island, near Glacier Bay, dates the arrival of shore pine and mountain hemlock to about 11900 years ago. Because of the early arrival to the area, and also shared genetic information found almost exclusively in trees of this region, it is suggested that nearby coastal refugia were the source of this pollen.

The exposed continental shelf during the LGM seems to have played a big part in supplying glacier refugia. That being said, the extent of the exposure is not well known. The evidence needed to show the composition and scope of these once exposed shelves is now deep underwater. A lack of information is due in part to the remoteness of the outer coast in addition to a lack of sea-floor imagery.

=== Haida Gwaii ===
A study of endemic ground-beetle population on the Haida Gwaii archipelago of British Columbia has given possible evidence for refugia in this region. The ground-beetle, or Carabid beetle, is an insect found worldwide. These beetles are oftentimes conspicuous and abundant, making them easy to collect, prepare, and study. The majority of carabids are found in cool- to cold-temperate zones, and almost half of its 20,000 identified species have been found in Canada and Alaska alone.

There were three identified endemic species of carabid beetle found on Haida Gwaii. All three of these species were found to exhibit brachyptery, which is the reduction of the beetles’ wings. Brachyptery was found to occur in areas of long-term occupation such as refugia, where wing-reduction allowed for the redirection of energy for travel towards other uses such as reproduction. Another finding was that between these three endemic species, they had two preferred habitats: high alpine zones and rocky beaches. These three species would have been well suited to refugia during the LGM as the continental shelf was exposed and some mountain peaks stuck out from the top of the ice sheet.

=== Cypress Hills ===
The Cypress Hills in Southeastern Alberta and Southwestern Saskatchewan, are a collection of hills that rise above the surrounding prairies. During the Laurentide Glaciation the Cypress Hills were left ice free. The Cypress Hills Glacial Refugia was home a diversity of flora and fauna.

=== Europe ===
During the LGM, many of the species of Europe retreated south, out of reach of the ice sheet and the colder climate. These southern refugia have been shown in looking at the pathways of the common European meadow grasshopper. Through analysis of the grasshoppers’ genome it was found that they had been divided into 5 different geographical regions: Turkey, Greece, Italy, Spain, and the Balkans. Despite significant differences in the ecology of species, some general colonization patterns are observed which are often common to several species groups. These colonization entailed successive bottlenecks phenomena that led to a loss of genetic diversity in northern populations. Therefore, based on the data of numerous phylogeographic research, the high genetic diversity of populations of southern regions can often be an indication for positioning a Pleistocene refugium, while the geographical distributions of the northern populations are dictated by the colonization patterns of the refugia populations. While these southern refugia have been found for many other species of flora and fauna, there may have been high altitude refugia on the coast of northern Norway.

One proposed refugium is on the island of Andøya in Norway. Pollen and chloroplast DNA of spruce and pine, found in the sedimentary deposits on this island, were dated to about 22,000 years BP for the spruce and about 17,700 years BP for the pine. This would put the pine in this region at a time when the ice sheet was just beginning to retreat, and would place the spruce in the area shortly after. When comparing this information to the geographical and climatic history of this region, the data seems questionable.

As the ice retreated about 22,000 years ago, it resulted in the submergence of large parts of the coastline in water. The study site in Andøya was underwater until about 18,000 years BP, making habitation of spruce unlikely. Furthermore, this regions present climate does not support spruce and is not ideal for pine. Because this region was likely harsher during the glacial period, it is doubtful that an already ill-equipped species would have been able to establish let alone survive. A possible explanation for the debatable dates obtained from the pollen and chloroplast samples is measurement device contamination.
