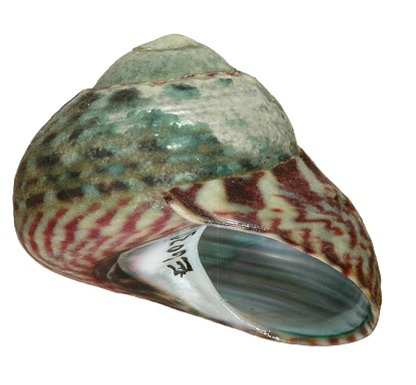
- Oxystele antoni

Scientific classification
- Kingdom: Animalia
- Phylum: Mollusca
- Class: Gastropoda
- Subclass: Vetigastropoda
- Order: Trochida
- Family: Trochidae
- Genus: Oxystele
- Species: O. antoni

Binomial name
- Oxystele antoni D. G. Herbert, 2015

Synonyms
- Diloma variegata (Anton, 1838); Oxystele impervius Menke, Schwarz, 1910; Oxystele sagittifera Lamarck, Smith, 1903; Oxystele sagittifera var. rufanensis Turton, 1932; Oxystele tabularis var. pulchra Turton, 1932; Oxystele variegata (Anton, 1838); Trochus impervius Menke, 1843; Trochus indecorus Philippi, 1844; Trochus variegatus Anton, 1839 (original description)

= Oxystele antoni =

Species of gastropod

Oxystele antoni, common name the variegated topshell, is a species of sea snail, a marine gastropod mollusk in the family Trochidae, the top snails.

== Description ==
The size of the shell varies between 15 mm and 20 mm.

== Distribution ==
This marine species occurs off the southern coast of South Africa, from Namibia to North Transkei.
