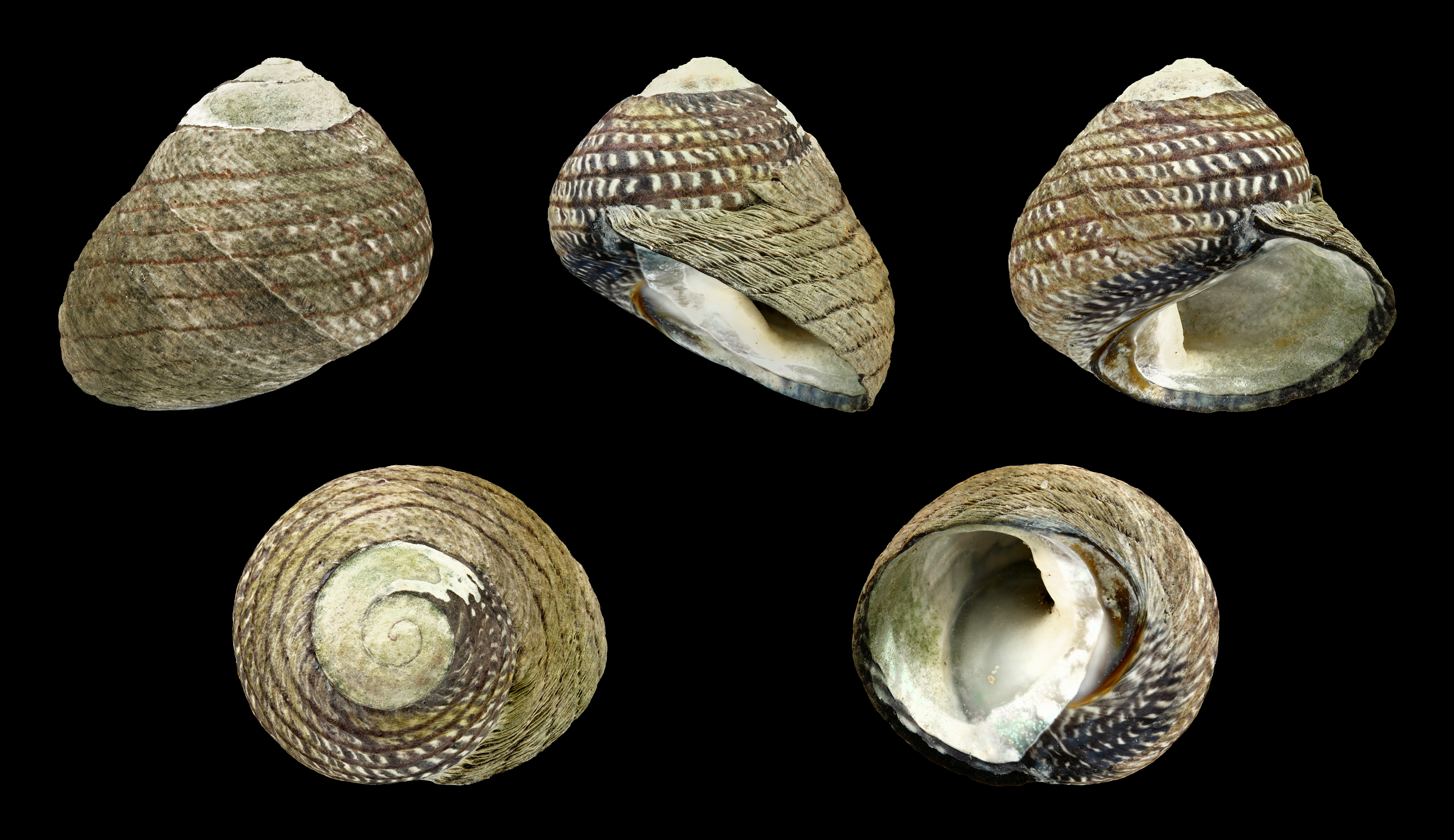

Scientific classification
- Kingdom: Animalia
- Phylum: Mollusca
- Class: Gastropoda
- Subclass: Vetigastropoda
- Order: Trochida
- Superfamily: Trochoidea
- Family: Trochidae
- Genus: Diloma
- Species: D. aethiops

Binomial name
- Diloma aethiops Gmelin, 1791

Synonyms
- Diloma gaimardi Hutton; Diloma (Melagraphia) aethiops (Gmelin, J.F., 1791); Melagraphia aethiops (Gmelin, 1791); Monodonta lugubris (Gmelin, 1791); Trochus bernardi Récluz, 1852; Trochus cingulatus Quoy et Gaimard; Trochus gaimardi Philippi; Trochus lugubris Gmelin, 1791; Trochus sulcatus Wood; Turbo aethiops Gmelin, 1791 (original combination)

= Diloma aethiops =

Species of gastropod

Diloma aethiops, whose common names include scorched monodont, spotted black topshell, and in the Māori language pūpū, pūpū-mai, or māihi is a species of small sea snail, a marine gastropod mollusc in the family Trochidae, subfamily Monodontinae.

== Description ==
The size of the shell varies between 15 mm and 30 mm. The thick, solid, imperforate shell has a depressed conical shape. It is blackish, dotted upon the ribs with yellow or white. The conic spire is more or less depressed with an acute apex. The five whorls are spirally strongly ridged. The ridges are nodulous and number three on the penultimate whorl. The interstices are spirally striate. The body whorl is depressed, angulate at the periphery, and concentrically lirate below. The lirae are coarsely granulose, about 5 in number. The aperture is very oblique. The outer lip is edged with blackish, then nacreous, and lined with opaque white, the thickening slightly notched at the place of the periphery. The oblique columella is nearly straight, flat, opaque white and backed by nacreous.

Animal: The foot is yellow below, with a brown stripe round the contour, black on the sides, with touches of yellowish-white behind; filaments greenish; mouth yellowish.

== Distribution and habitat ==
This species is endemic to New Zealand. It is common to abundant in rocky intertidal areas, where it is the only trochid found on open rock surfaces, in sheltered areas and semi-exposed coasts. In harbours or estuaries it often occurs with D. subrostrata on hard packed mud among empty bivalve shells.
