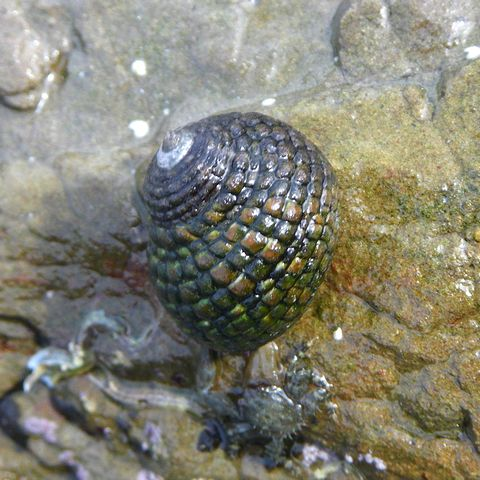
- Monodonta labio

Scientific classification
- Kingdom: Animalia
- Phylum: Mollusca
- Class: Gastropoda
- Subclass: Vetigastropoda
- Order: Trochida
- Superfamily: Trochoidea
- Family: Trochidae
- Genus: Monodonta; Lamarck, 1799

Type species
- Trochus labio Linnaeus, 1758

Species
- See text

Synonyms
- Labio Oken, 1815; Monodontes Montfort, 1810; Neomonodonta Kuroda & Habe, 1971; Odontis Sowerby, 1825; Pimpellies Gistel, 1848; Trochidon Swainson, 1840

= Monodonta =

Genus of gastropods

Monodonta is a genus of sea snails, marine gastropod mollusks in the family Trochidae, the top snails.

The genus Monodonta was first separated from the Linnaean genus Trochus by Lamarck in 1801 with Trochus labio Linnaeus, 1758 given as the type species. Labio is a junior homonym of Labio Oken, 1815, itself a synonym of Monodonta Lamarck, 1799

== Description ==
The very heavy, thick, solid shell has a turbinate-conic shape. The shell is smooth or spirally ridged. The outer lip is plicate within. The short, porcellanous columella is strong, cylindrical, bulging or more or less toothed near or at the base. Between this tooth and the basal margin there is a square notch or channel. The aperture is as high as wide.

== Distribution ==
The species of this marine genus occurs over a wide area: Central and East Indian Ocean, Indo-China, Indo-Malaysian Oceania, the Philippines, Japan and Australia (Northern Territory, Queensland, Western Australia).

== Species ==
Species within the genus Monodonta include:

- Monodonta australis (Lamarck, 1816)
- Monodonta canalifera Lamarck, 1816
- Monodonta confusa Tapparone-Canefri, 1874
- Monodonta gibbula Thiele, 1925
- Monodonta glabrata Gould, 1861
- Monodonta labio (Linnaeus, 1758)
- Monodonta lugubris Lamarck, 1822
- Monodonta nebulosa Forsskal in Niebuhr, 1775
- Monodonta neritoides (Philippi, 1849)
- Monodonta perplexa Pilsbry, 1889
- Monodonta vermiculata (P. Fischer, 1874)
- Monodonta viridis Lamarck, 1816

Species brought into synonymy

- Labio corrosa A. Adams, 1853: synonym of Diloma subrostratum (Gray, 1835)
- Monodonta (Osilinus) Philippi, 1847: synonym of Osilinus Philippi, 1847
- Monodonta adelaidae Philippi, 1849: synonym of Chlorodiloma adelaidae (Philippi, 1849)
- Monodonta aegyptiaca Lamarck, 1822: synonym of Rubritrochus declivis (Forskål, 1775)
- Monodonta alveolata A. Adams, 1853: synonym of Herpetopoma instrictum (Gould, 1849)
- Monodonta angulifera A. Adams, 1853: synonym of Perrinia angulifera (A. Adams, 1853)
- Monodonta belliaei Michaud, 1829: synonym of Homalopoma sanguineum (Linnaeus, 1758)
- Monodonta berthelotii d'Orbigny, 1840: synonym of Clanculus berthelotii (d'Orbigny, 1840)
- Monodonta bourcierei Crosse, 1863: synonym of Herpetopoma instrictum (Gould, 1849)
- Monodonta carchedonius Lamarck, 1822: synonym of Modulus carchedonius (Lamarck, 1822)
- Monodonta clathrata A. Adams, 1853: synonym of Vaceuchelus clathratus (A. Adams, 1853)
- Monodonta colubrina (Gould, 1851): synonym of Osilinus sauciatus (Koch, 1845)
- Monodonta conica Gray, 1827: synonym of Thalotia conica (Gray, 1827)
- Monodonta constellata (Souverbie in Souverbie & Montrouzier, 1863): synonym of Trochus constellatus Souverbie in Souverbie & Montrouzier, 1863
- Monodonta constricta Lamarck, 1822: synonym of Austrocochlea constricta (Lamarck, 1822)
- Monodonta coronaria Lamarck, 1816: synonym of Tectarius grandinatus (Gmelin, 1791)
- Monodonta couturii Payraudeau, B.-C., 1826: synonym of Clanculus corallinus (Gmelin, J.F., 1791)
- Monodonta crinita Philippi, 1849: synonym of Chlorodiloma crinita (Philippi, 1849)
- Monodonta dama (Philippi, 1848): synonym of Monodonta nebulosa Forsskal in Niebuhr, 1775
- Monodonta draparnaudii Payraudeau, 1826: synonym of Phorcus articulatus (Lamarck, 1822)
- Monodonta fischeri Montrouzier [in Souverbie & Montrouzier], 1866: synonym of Herpetopoma fischeri (Montrouzier [in Souverbie & Montrouzier], 1866); synonym of Herpetopoma exasperatum (A. Adams, 1853)
- Monodonta foveolata A. Adams, 1853: synonym of Vaceuchelus clathratus (A. Adams, 1853)
- Monodonta fragaroides Lamarck, 1822 : synonym of Phorcus turbinatus (Born, 1778)
- Monodonta fulgurata (Philippi, 1846): synonym of Oxystele fulgurata (Philippi, 1848)
- Monodonta glomus Philippi, 1844: synonym of Clanculus jussieui (Payraudeau, 1826)
- Monodonta immanis Fischer, 1880: synonym of Monodonta labio (Linnaeus, 1758)
- Monodonta jussieui Payraudeau, 1826: synonym of Clanculus jussieui (Payraudeau, 1826)
- Monodonta kraussii Philippi, 1846: synonym of Clanculus kraussii (Philippi, 1846)
- Monodonta lessoni Payraudeau, 1826: synonym of Gibbula divaricata (Linnaeus, 1758)
- Monodonta limbata Philippi, 1844: synonym of Danilia tinei (Calcara, 1839)
- Monodonta lineata (Da Costa, 1778) synonym of Osilinus lineatus (da Costa, 1778)
- Monodonta margaritaria Philippi, 1846: synonym of Clanculus margaritarius (Philippi, 1846)
- Monodonta melaurchelonis Philippi: synonym of Monodonta labio (Linnaeus, 1758)
- Monodonta mutabilis (Philippi, 1846): synonym of Phorcus mutabilis (Philippi, 1846)
- Monodonta obscura (Wood, 1828): synonym of Priotrochus obscurus (W. Wood, 1828)
- Monodonta olivieri Payraudeau, 1826: synonym of Phorcus turbinatus (Born, 1778)
- Monodonta punicea Philippi, 1846: synonym of Clanculus puniceus (Philippi, 1846)
- Monodonta richardi Payraudeau, 1826: synonym of Phorcus richardi (Payraudeau, 1826)
- Monodonta rubra A. Adams, 1851: synonym of Herpetopoma rubrum (A. Adams, 1851)
- Monodonta sagittifera Lamarck: synonym of Oxystele impervia (Menke, 1843)
- Monodonta subrostrata Gray, 1835: synonym of Diloma subrostrata (Gray, 1835)
- Monodonta tigrinus Odhner, 1923: synonym of Oxystele tigrina (Anton, 1838)
- Monodonta tinei Calcara, 1839: synonym of Danilia tinei (Calcara, 1839)
- Monodonta tridentata Potiez & Michaud, 1838: synonym of Tegula tridentata (Potiez & Michaud, 1838)
- Monodonta tuberculata A. Adams, 1853: synonym of Monodonta labio (Linnaeus, 1758)
- Monodonta turbinata (Born, 1778): synonym of Phorcus turbinatus (Born, 1778)
- Monodonta ulvae Risso, 1826: synonym of Phorcus articulatus (Lamarck, 1822)
- Monodonta vieilliotii Payraudeau, 1826: synonym of Clanculus cruciatus (Linnaeus, 1758)
