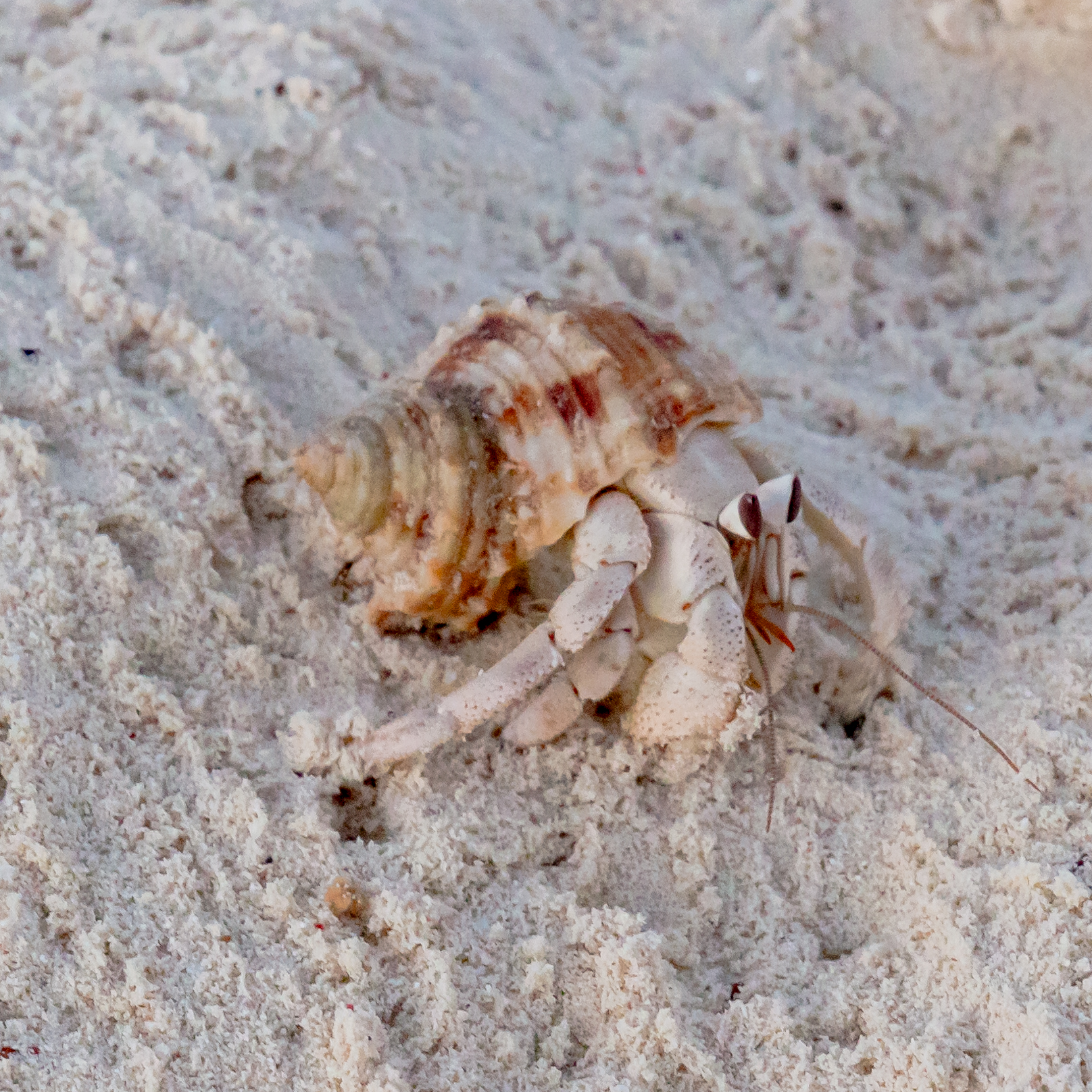

Scientific classification
- Kingdom: Animalia
- Phylum: Arthropoda
- Clade: Pancrustacea
- Class: Malacostraca
- Order: Decapoda
- Suborder: Pleocyemata
- Infraorder: Anomura
- Family: Coenobitidae
- Genus: Coenobita
- Species: C. scaevola

Binomial name
- Coenobita scaevola (Forskål, 1775)

Synonyms
- Cancer scaevola Forskål, 1775; Coenobita compressa var. jousseaumei Bouvier, 1892; Coenobita rugosa var. granulata Bouvier, 1890; Coenobita rugosa var. jousseaumei Bouvier, 1890

= Coenobita scaevola =

Species of crustacean

Coenobita scaevola is a species of terrestrial hermit crab from the western Indian Ocean and Red Sea.

== Distribution ==
Coenobita scaevola lives around parts of the Indian Ocean, including the Gulf of Aden and the coasts of Somalia and Pakistan. Although the hermit crabs of the Red Sea are poorly studied, they include C. scaevola as the region's only species of terrestrial hermit crab.

== Taxonomy ==
Coenobita scaevola was first described in 1775 by Peter Forsskål, under the name Cancer scaevola, with a type locality of Jeddah, Saudi Arabia.

== Life cycle ==
Reproduction takes place during the hottest months of the year, when temperatures are 24–38 °C (75–100 °F). In common with other hermit crabs, the young animals of Coenobita scaevola pass through a number of larval phases, before reaching the glaucothoe and then the juvenile stage. C. scaevola has the greatest number of zoeal phases of any Coenobita species (seven), and they last longer than in any other Coenobita species, lasting a total of 54–80 days.

== Ecology ==
Coenobita scaevola can survive in arid conditions, such as those on the Sinai Peninsula, but only close to the shore, to which it must return regularly to replenish the water stored in its shell for respiration. C. scaevola rests in burrows or among coastal vegetation during the heat of the day, and emerges at night to feed. Although the air temperature outside the burrows can reach 33 °C (91 °F) during the day, at a depth of 10 cm (3.9 in), the temperature does not exceed 28 °C (82 °F).

Most adults up to a carapace length of 7.5 mm (0.30 in) occupy a Nerita undata shell. Larger individuals choose Turbo radiatus, Polinices milanstomus and Monodonta canalifera, while small individuals (below 3 mm or 0.12 in) occupy shells of Planaxis sulcatus and Nassarius arcularia.
