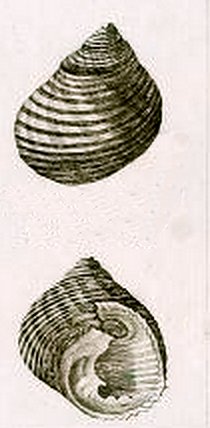
- Drawing with two views of a shell of Monodonta viridis

Scientific classification
- Kingdom: Animalia
- Phylum: Mollusca
- Class: Gastropoda
- Subclass: Vetigastropoda
- Order: Trochida
- Superfamily: Trochoidea
- Family: Trochidae
- Genus: Monodonta
- Species: M. viridis

Binomial name
- Monodonta viridis Lamarck, 1816

Synonyms
- Trochus melanochlorus Philippi

= Monodonta viridis =

Species of gastropod

Monodonta viridis is a species of sea snail, a marine gastropod mollusk in the family Trochidae, the top snails.

== Description ==
The shell is almost similar to Monodonta australis, but is dark green, unicolored or nearly so.
