= Monodonta confusa =

Scientific classification
- Kingdom: Animalia
- Phylum: Mollusca
- Class: Gastropoda
- Subclass: Vetigastropoda
- Order: Trochida
- Superfamily: Trochoidea
- Family: Trochidae
- Genus: Monodonta
- Species: M. confusa

Binomial name
- Monodonta confusa Tapparone-Canefri, 1874

Synonyms
- Monodonta labio confusa Tapparone-Canefri, 1874

Species of gastropod

Monodonta confusa is a species of sea snail, a marine gastropod mollusk in the family Trochidae, the top snails.

== Description ==
The height of the shell attains 20 mm, its diameter 18 mm. This species is shaped like Monodonta labio. The color is pink, longitudinally clouded with dusky. The penultimate whorl bears 5 or 6, the last 13 or 14 spiral ridges. The second one from the suture is very narrow. The others are subequal, but become smaller beneath. There are no lirulae intercalated between the ridges on the last whorl, as is usually the case in Monodonta labio. And the ridges are very conspicuously and regularly cut into oblong subquadrangular or lozenge-shaped grains by vertical impressions as deep as the interliral groove. The basal tooth of the columella is smaller and more acute than in a typical Monodonta labio.

== Distribution ==
This marine species occurs off Japan, Singapore and the Philippines.
