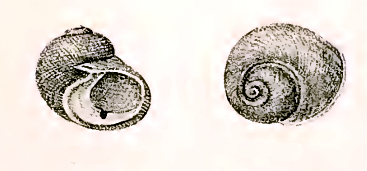
- Drawing with two views of a shell of Monodonta neritoides

Scientific classification
- Kingdom: Animalia
- Phylum: Mollusca
- Class: Gastropoda
- Subclass: Vetigastropoda
- Order: Trochida
- Superfamily: Trochoidea
- Family: Trochidae
- Genus: Monodonta
- Species: M. neritoides

Binomial name
- Monodonta neritoides (Philippi, 1849)

Synonyms
- Trochus neritoides Philippi, 1849

= Monodonta neritoides =

Species of gastropod

Monodonta neritoides is a species of sea snail, a marine gastropod mollusk in the family Trochidae, the top snails.

== Description ==
The height of the shell attains 16 mm. The imperforate shell has a semiglobose shape and is very oblique. The shell is smooth, black, painted with numerous white zigzag lines. The five whorls rapidly widen.. The spire is retuse. The aperture is semiovate. The thin lip is duplicated and coarsely crenate. The flat columella is grooved by a parallel sulcus, terminating in an acute tooth below.

The shell is very similar to a Nerita on account of its semiglobose form, very obtuse spire, flat base and rapidly widening whorls. The uppermost whorls are flat, and spirally striate. The penultimate whorl is convex. The last whorl is completely smooth, obliquely descending, flatly depressed above, almost concave. The aperture is almost exactly like that of Monodonta canalifera. The outer lip is on its outer part, inside the edge lined with mother-of-pearl, visibly furrowed.. On this part borders a white porcellanous coat, underneath standing out like a rib, on the base cut by two furrows. The throat is nacreous all around. The columella is compressed, flat, arcuate, produced into a sharp tooth below, and outwardly with a furrow parallel with its free margin. The color is black, with narrow white dense zig-zag curved streaks. The spire is pure black.

There are forms with more elevated whorls, departing a little from the usual form.

== Distribution ==
This marine species occurs off Taiwan, Korea and Japan.
