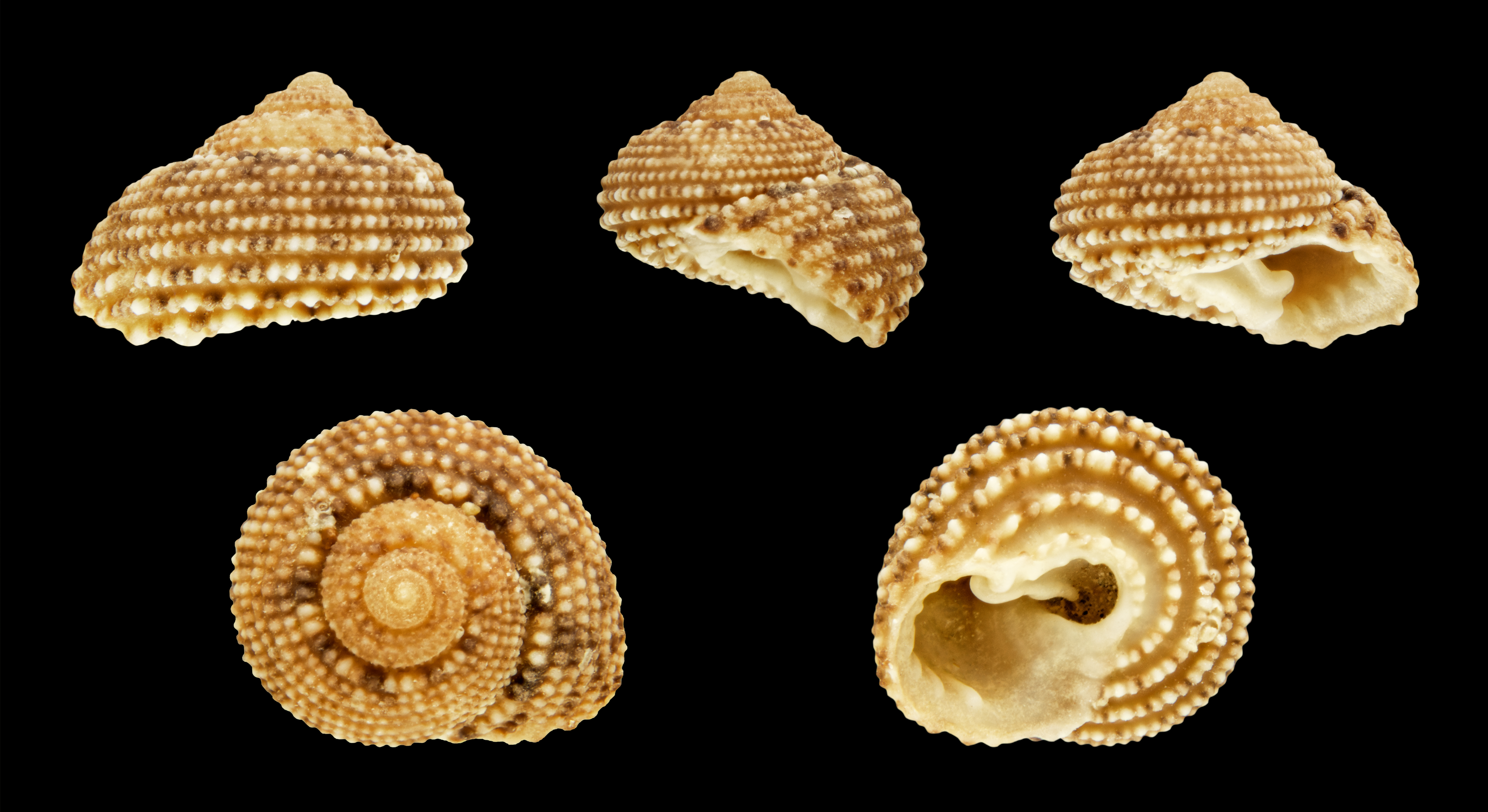
- A shell of Clanculus berthelotii

Scientific classification
- Kingdom: Animalia
- Phylum: Mollusca
- Class: Gastropoda
- Subclass: Vetigastropoda
- Order: Trochida
- Superfamily: Trochoidea
- Family: Trochidae
- Genus: Clanculus
- Species: C. berthelotii

Binomial name
- Clanculus berthelotii (d'Orbigny, 1840)

Synonyms
- Clanculus bertheloti Thorson G., 1967; Monodonta berthelotii d'Orbigny, 1840 (original combination); Trochus berthelotii (d'Orbigny, 1840)

= Clanculus berthelotii =

Species of gastropod

Clanculus berthelotii is a species of sea snail, a marine gastropod mollusk in the family Trochidae, the top snails.

== Description ==
The size of the shell varies between 5 mm and 11 mm. The small shell has a globose-conic shape and is very similar in form to Clanculus corallinus. The five whorls are acutely granose-lirate. They are brown, below the sutures more or less maculated with blackish. The base of the shell is dotted with white. The body whorl is encircled by 11 sharply granose ridges, those of the base profoundly separated by deep grooves, wider than the ridges. The aperture is as in Clanculus corallinus, but the tooth at base of columella is more pointed and smaller.

== Distribution ==
This species occurs in the North Atlantic Ocean (the Azores, Madeira and the Canary Islands)
