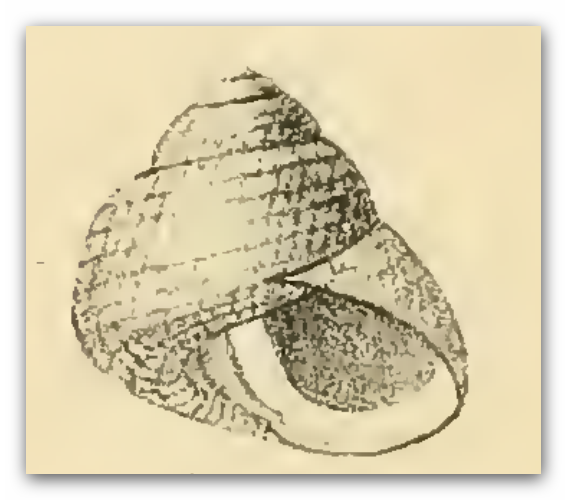
- Drawing with an apertural view of a shell of Chlorodiloma crinita

Scientific classification
- Kingdom: Animalia
- Phylum: Mollusca
- Class: Gastropoda
- Subclass: Vetigastropoda
- Order: Trochida
- Superfamily: Trochoidea
- Family: Trochidae
- Genus: Chlorodiloma; Pilsbry, 1889

Type species
- Chlorodiloma crinita Philippi, R.A., 1849

Synonyms
- Diloma (Chlorodiloma) Pilsbry, 1889; Latona Hutton, 1884 (Invalid: junior homonym of Latona Schumacher, 1817; Chlorodiloma is a replacement name)

= Chlorodiloma =

Genus of gastropods

Chlorodiloma is a genus of sea snails, marine gastropod mollusks in the family Trochidae, the top snails.

== Description ==
The shell in this genus is like the shell of Diloma but rather more conical and less nacreous. The coloration is variegated, consisting of fine lines of dark on a lighter ground. The columella is generally green. The umbilicus is perforate or subperforate.

== Species ==
Species within the genus Chlorodiloma include:

- Chlorodiloma adelaidae (Philippi, 1849)
- Chlorodiloma crinita (Philippi, 1849)
- Chlorodiloma millelineata (Bonnet, 1864)
- Chlorodiloma odontis (W. Wood, 1828)
