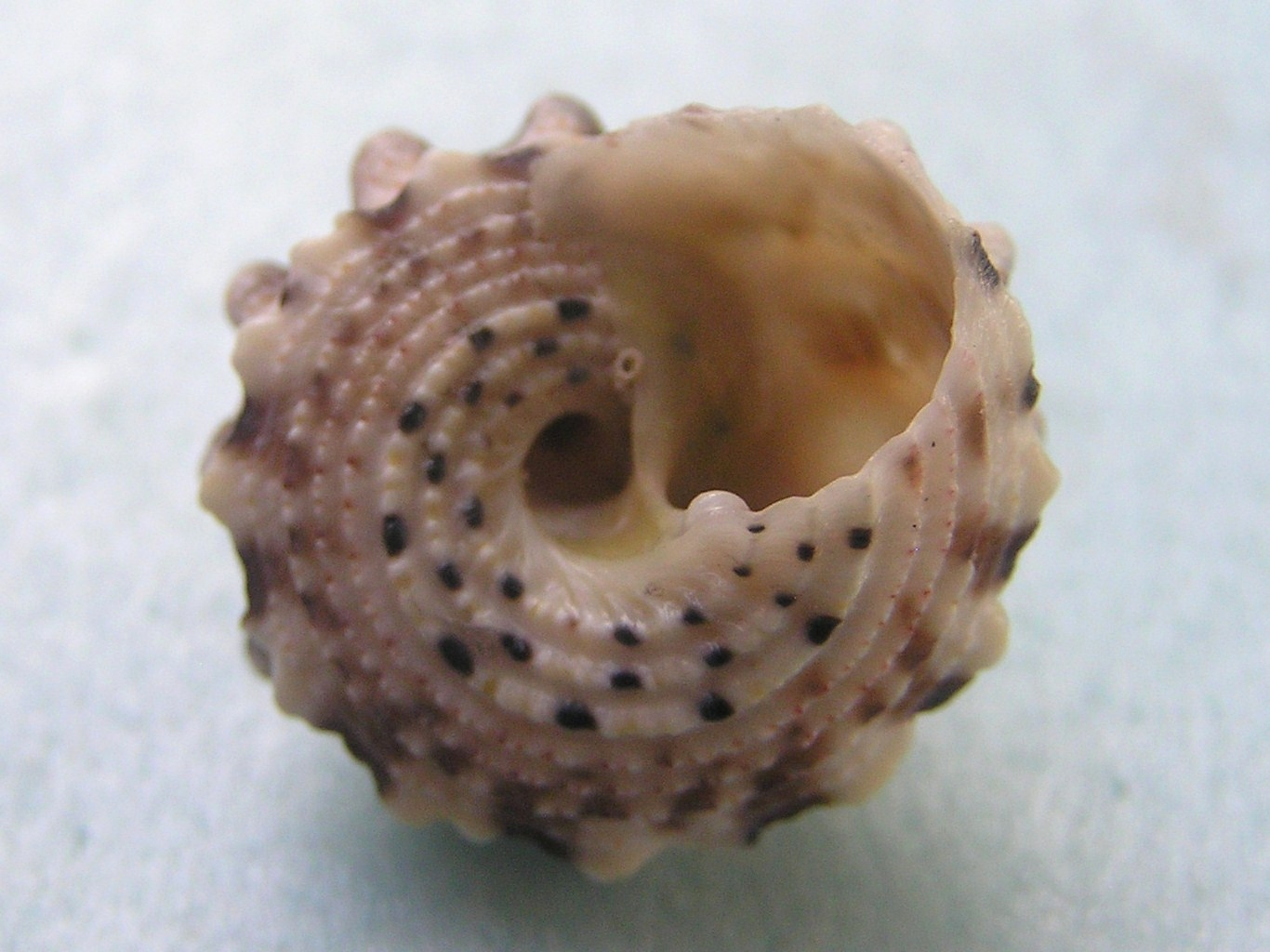
- Apertural view of a shell of Rubritrochus declivis

Scientific classification
- Kingdom: Animalia
- Phylum: Mollusca
- Class: Gastropoda
- Subclass: Vetigastropoda
- Order: Trochida
- Family: Trochidae
- Genus: Rubritrochus; L. Beck, 1995

Type species
- Gibbula pulcherrima A. Adams, 1855

= Rubritrochus =

Genus of gastropods

Rubritrochus is a genus of sea snails, marine gastropod mollusks in the subfamily Trochinae of the family Trochidae, the top snails. Rubritrochus can be found in almost every area of the sea.

== Species ==
Species within the genus Rubritrochus include:

- † Rubritrochus africanus Harzhauser, 2009
- Rubritrochus andamanensis Dekker, 2018
- † Rubritrochus bonneti (Cossmann, 1910)
- Rubritrochus declivis (Forskål, 1775)
- Rubritrochus ellenae Dekker, 2018
- Rubritrochus lagerweijae Dekker, 2018
- Rubritrochus moolenbeeki Dekker, 2018
- † Rubritrochus pachyozodes (Cossmann, 1910)
- Rubritrochus pulcherrimus (A. Adams, 1855)
- Rubritrochus simoni Dekker, 2018
