= Monodonta glabrata =

Scientific classification
- Kingdom: Animalia
- Phylum: Mollusca
- Class: Gastropoda
- Subclass: Vetigastropoda
- Order: Trochida
- Superfamily: Trochoidea
- Family: Trochidae
- Genus: Monodonta
- Species: M. glabrata

Binomial name
- Monodonta glabrata Gould, 1861

Synonyms
- Monodonta glabratum Gould, 1861

Species of gastropod

Monodonta glabrata is a species of sea snail, a marine gastropod mollusk in the family Trochidae, the top snails.

== Description ==
The height of the shell attains 15 mm, its diameter 13 mm. The thick, smooth shell has a globose-conical shape. It is dark green, becoming black at times up to the apex and paler to the periphery. The shell contains seven convex whorls. The rounded-ovate aperture is large. The inner lip is sulcate. The columellar tooth is sharp and sulcate.

== Distribution ==
This marine species occurs off China.
