= Monodonta gibbula =

Scientific classification
- Kingdom: Animalia
- Phylum: Mollusca
- Class: Gastropoda
- Subclass: Vetigastropoda
- Order: Trochida
- Superfamily: Trochoidea
- Family: Trochidae
- Genus: Monodonta
- Species: M. gibbula

Binomial name
- Monodonta gibbula Thiele, 1925

Species of gastropod

Monodonta gibbula is a species of sea snail, a marine gastropod mollusk in the family Trochidae, the top snails.

== Distribution ==
This marine species occurs off the Agulhas Current, South Africa.
