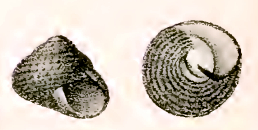
- Drawing with two views of a shell of Chlorodiloma adelaidae

Scientific classification
- Kingdom: Animalia
- Phylum: Mollusca
- Class: Gastropoda
- Subclass: Vetigastropoda
- Order: Trochida
- Superfamily: Trochoidea
- Family: Trochidae
- Genus: Chlorodiloma
- Species: C. adelaidae

Binomial name
- Chlorodiloma adelaidae (Philippi, 1849)

Synonyms
- Austrocochlea adelaidae (Philippi, 1849); Diloma adelaidae Pritchard, G.B. & Gatliff, J.H. 1902; Diloma australis Tenison-Woods, 1876; Gibbula adelaidae Adams, A. 1853; Gibbula depressa Tenison-Woods, 1876; Monodonta adelaidae (Philippi, 1849); Monodonta (Chlorodiloma) adelaidae Tryon, G.W. 1889; Oxystele adelaidae Adams, H. & Adams, A. 1854; Trochocochlea australis Favanne, J. G. de 1784; Trochus adelaidae Philippi, 1849 (original description); Trochus (Diloma) adelaidae Brazier, J. 1887; Trochus australis Petterd, W. 1879; Trochus (Diloma) australis Tenison-Woods, J.E. 1877

= Chlorodiloma adelaidae =

Species of gastropod

Chlorodiloma adelaidae is a species of sea snail, a marine gastropod mollusk in the family Trochidae, the top snails.

== Description ==
This species differs only from Chlorodiloma crinita in lacking the tooth at the base of the columella. The coloration, sculpture and form are identical.

== Distribution ==
This marine species is endemic to Australia and occurs off South Australia and Tasmania.
