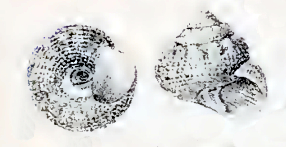
- Drawing with two views of a shell of Rubritrochus pulcherrimus

Scientific classification
- Kingdom: Animalia
- Phylum: Mollusca
- Class: Gastropoda
- Subclass: Vetigastropoda
- Order: Trochida
- Superfamily: Trochoidea
- Family: Trochidae
- Genus: Rubritrochus
- Species: R. pulcherrimus

Binomial name
- Rubritrochus pulcherrimus (A. Adams, 1855)

Synonyms
- Forskälia pulcherrima H. & A. Adams; Gibbula pulcherrima A. Adams, 1855; Trochus fanuloides P. Fischer, 1874; Trochus (Forskälia) pulcherrimus E.A. Smith, 1879

= Rubritrochus pulcherrimus =

Species of gastropod

Rubritrochus pulcherrimus is a species of sea snail, a marine gastropod mollusk in the family Trochidae, the top snails.

== Description ==
The height of the shell attains 14 mm (0.55 in), its diameter 16 mm (0.63 in). The solid, umbilicate shell has a conoidal shape. It is lusterless, white with a series of red spots below the sutures, another beneath the periphery, and more or less closely red-dotted over the whole shell. The acute spire is conical, acute, somewhat scalariform. The sutures are very deeply impressed. The about 6 whorls are very convex and nodulose below the sutures. The entire surface is covered with spiral lirae which are distinctly beaded on the base, less obviously so above. They number about 12 on the penultimate whorl, 20 on the body whorl. The oblique aperture is subcircular. The outer lip is bevelled to an edge. The bevel is iridescent and pearly. The interior is very regularly lirate, the folds numbering about 14. The columella is not thickened. It is arcuate, cut or excavated out, at its junction with the body produced forward in a white lobe, ending below in a denticle. The umbilicus is deep, with a slight spiral rib near its opening, ending in the columellar tooth.

== Distribution ==
This species occurs in the Red Sea and in the Indian Ocean off Mozambique.
