= Monodonta perplexa =

- Five views of a shell of Monodonta perplexa

Scientific classification
- Kingdom: Animalia
- Phylum: Mollusca
- Class: Gastropoda
- Subclass: Vetigastropoda
- Order: Trochida
- Superfamily: Trochoidea
- Family: Trochidae
- Genus: Monodonta
- Species: M. perplexa

Binomial name
- Monodonta perplexa Pilsbry, 1889

Species of gastropod

Monodonta perplexa is a species of sea snail, a marine gastropod mollusk in the family Trochidae, the top snails.

This genus consists of two subspecies:

- Monodonta perplexa boninensis Asakura & Nishimura, 1987
- Monodonta perplexa perplexa Pilsbry, 1889

== Description ==
The height of the shell attains 8.5 mm, its diameter 10 mm. The imperforate, oblique shell has a depressed-conoid shape. It is light green, radiately flamulate above with wide zigzag dark green stripes, more narrowly striped below, encircled about the middle with a well-defined lighter zone. The entire surface is polished, and marked with numerous slightly impressed light-colored spiral lines. The acute, conic spire is very short. The sutures are more impressed than usual in this group. The five whorls are quite convex, the upper ones ruddy or purplish, the last very large, slightly compressed just below the suture, and gently descending anteriorly. The very large aperture is very oblique. The acute outer lip is thin, pearly and iridescent, and, apparently lirate within. The columella is extremely oblique. Its inner edge is concave, distinctly toothed or hooked below, bearing a shallow groove parallel with the edge, from the place of the umbilicus downward. The white columellar area is very wide.

== Distribution ==
This marine species occurs off Taiwan and Japan.
