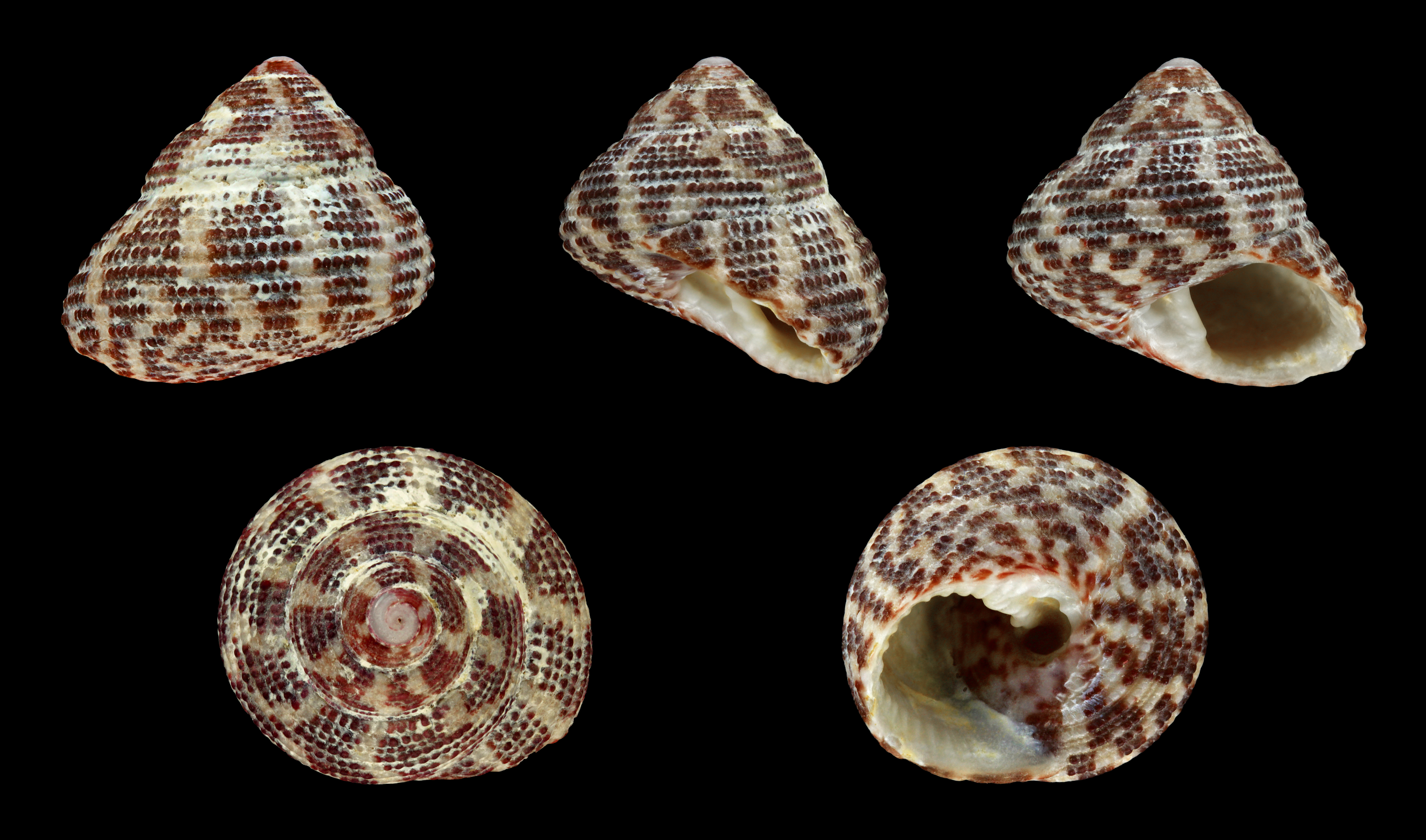

Scientific classification
- Kingdom: Animalia
- Phylum: Mollusca
- Class: Gastropoda
- Subclass: Vetigastropoda
- Order: Trochida
- Superfamily: Trochoidea
- Family: Trochidae
- Genus: Clanculus
- Species: C. kraussii

Binomial name
- Clanculus kraussii (Philippi, 1846)

Synonyms
- Monodonta kraussii Philippi, 1846 (original description); Trochus kraussi (Philippi, 1846)

= Clanculus kraussii =

Species of gastropod

Clanculus kraussii is a species of sea snail, a marine gastropod mollusk in the family Trochidae, the top snails.

There is also a homonym Clanculus kraussi (non-Philippi) Sowerby, 1897, a synonym of Clanculus atricatena J.R. Tomlin, 1921

== Description ==
The size of the shell varies between 9 mm and 23 mm. The umbilicate, moderately thick shell has a conoid shape. The five convex whorls are separated by canaliculate sutures. The first whorls are eroded, whitish, the rest roseus, cinereous or brownish, ornamented with a few radiating white streaks. They are spirally granose-lirate with 6 finely beaded lirae on the penultimate whorl, the fifth larger, more prominent, simulating a carina. The body whorl is angulate, plano-convex beneath and concentrically cingulate. The about 7 cinguli are granose with the interstices sometimes bearing concentric lirulae. The aperture is rhomboidal. The lip within is thickened and sulcate. The basal margin is crenulate. The columella is tuberculose, above twisted plicate, below obsoletely truncate. The white umbilical area is spirally plicate with a crenulate margin. The thin parietal callus is wrinkled.

== Distribution ==
This marine species occurs in the Atlantic Ocean from Morocco to Angola.
