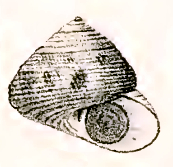
- Drawing with an apertural view of a shell of Chlorodiloma millelineata

Scientific classification
- Kingdom: Animalia
- Phylum: Mollusca
- Class: Gastropoda
- Subclass: Vetigastropoda
- Order: Trochida
- Superfamily: Trochoidea
- Family: Trochidae
- Genus: Chlorodiloma
- Species: C. millelineata

Binomial name
- Chlorodiloma millelineata (Bonnet, 1864)

Synonyms
- Diloma (Chlorodiloma) millelineata (Bonnett, 1864); Trochus (Monodonta) millelineatus Bonnet, 1864

= Chlorodiloma millelineata =

Species of gastropod

Chlorodiloma millelineata is a species of sea snail, a marine gastropod mollusk in the family Trochidae, the top snails.

== Description ==
The height of the shell attains 19 mm, its diameter 21 mm. The thick shell has a very deep umbilicus, nearly reaching to the apex. It is a little shining, yellowish, with elongated flexuous unequal brownish-green spots and dots of the same color. The acute spire is little elevated. The 6 whorls are obliquely striate. The body whorl is very large and contains numerous irregular spiral ridges, stronger and numbering 6 on the base, with obliquely striate interstices. The oblique aperture is rounded, nacreous with greenish reflections and showing the folds inside.

== Distribution ==
This marine species is endemic to Australia and occurs in the Torres Straits and off Queensland.
