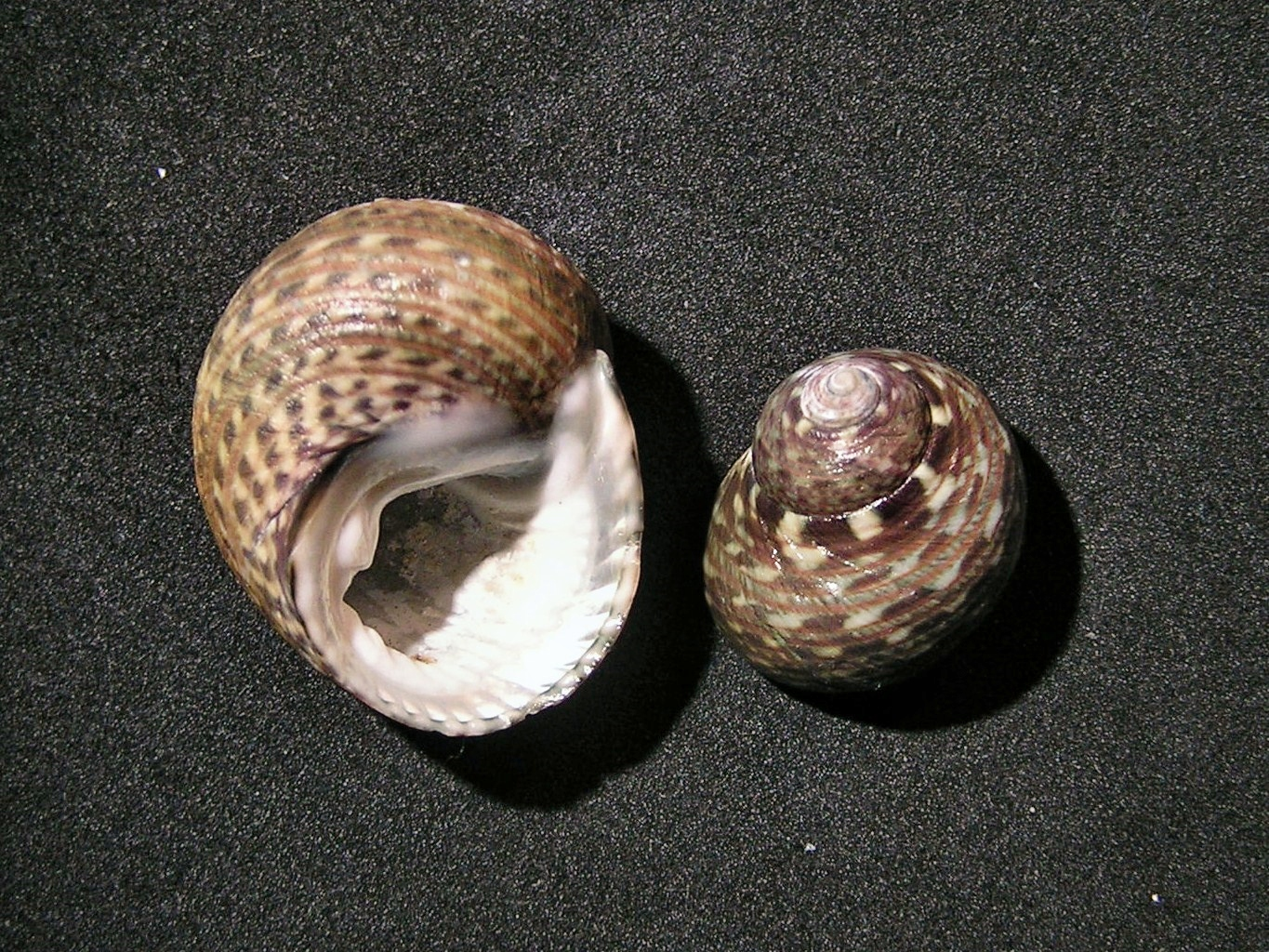
- Two shells of Monodonta vermiculata

Scientific classification
- Kingdom: Animalia
- Phylum: Mollusca
- Class: Gastropoda
- Subclass: Vetigastropoda
- Order: Trochida
- Superfamily: Trochoidea
- Family: Trochidae
- Genus: Monodonta
- Species: M. vermiculata

Binomial name
- Monodonta vermiculata (P. Fischer, 1874)

Synonyms
- Trochus vermiculatus Fischer, 1874

= Monodonta vermiculata =

Species of gastropod

Monodonta vermiculata, common name the toothed topshell, is a species of sea snail, a marine gastropod mollusk in the family Trochidae, the top snails.

== Description ==
The height of the shell attains 23 mm (0.91 in), its diameter 26 mm (1.0 in). The imperforate, solid, thick shell is subglobose. The short spire is conoid. The shell contains 4 to 5 whorls. The penultimate and last whorl are quite convex, the last descending, more or less concave just below the linear suture. The young shells are obsoletely spirally lirate, their sculpture disappearing with age. The coloration consists of numerous narrow red or orange zones alternating with bands of light green articulated with black. The oblique aperture is round-ovate. The outer lip is finely plicate within. The basal lip is thickened and plicate. The short columella terminates in an acute tooth. The middle of the columellar area contains a longitudinal semilunar groove, frequently irregularly curved. The basal notch or canal is oblique, squarish, wider than deep, and not denticulate in the middle.

There is great variation in color in this species. In some specimens red predominates, in others green. And often the general effect is an olive shade. There is usually a subsutural series of light and dark dashes. The numerous narrow red spiral lines are characteristic.

== Distribution ==
This species occurs in the Red Sea, off Socotra and Muscat
