= Monodonta nebulosa =

- Monodonta nebulosa

Scientific classification
- Kingdom: Animalia
- Phylum: Mollusca
- Class: Gastropoda
- Subclass: Vetigastropoda
- Order: Trochida
- Superfamily: Trochoidea
- Family: Trochidae
- Genus: Monodonta
- Species: M. nebulosa

Binomial name
- Monodonta nebulosa (Forsskal in Niebuhr, 1775)

Synonyms
- Monodonta dama (Philippi, 1848); Turbo nebulosus Forsskål in Niebuhr, 1775 (original combination)

Species of gastropod

Monodonta nebulosa is a species of sea snail, a marine gastropod mollusk in the family Trochidae, the top snails.

== Description ==
The shell size varies between 15 mm and 22 mm, the body volume is 1.46 cm^{3}, and the wet body mass is 2.55 grams. The species is a grazer, and eats mostly on low growing organisms, for example: grasses, forbs, or algae.

== Distribution ==
This species is distributed around the Red Sea and the Eastern Indian Ocean.
