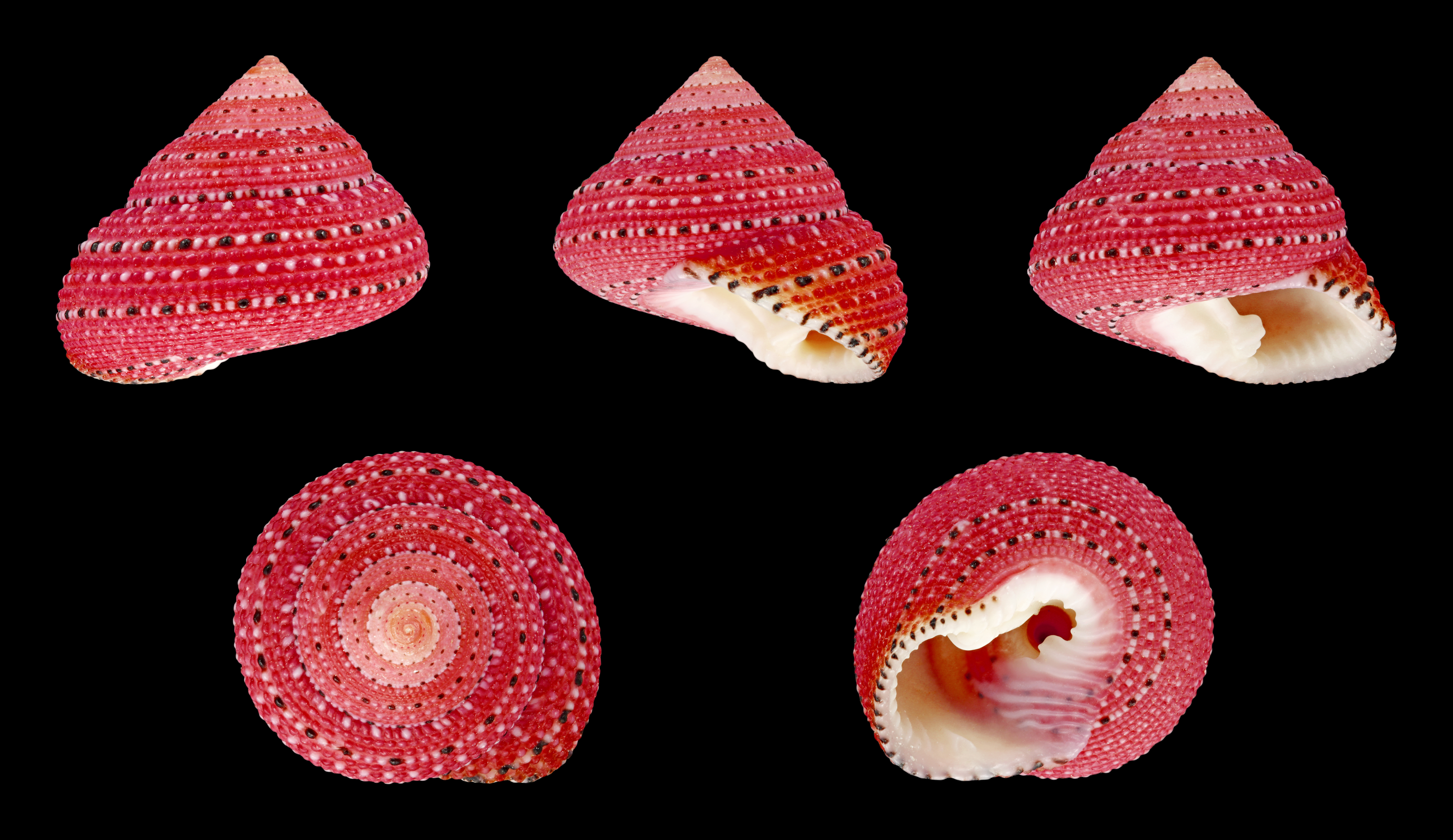
- A shell of Clanculus puniceus from Madagascar

Scientific classification
- Domain: Eukaryota
- Kingdom: Animalia
- Phylum: Mollusca
- Class: Gastropoda
- Subclass: Vetigastropoda
- Order: Trochida
- Superfamily: Trochoidea
- Family: Trochidae
- Genus: Clanculus
- Species: C. puniceus

Binomial name
- Clanculus puniceus (Philippi, 1846)

Synonyms
- Clanculus (Clanculus) puniceus (Philippi, 1846); Clanculus miniatus Macnae & Kalk, 1969; Monodonta punicea Philippi, 1846; Trochus puniceus (Philippi, 1846); Trochus (Clanculus) puniceus (Philippi, 1846)

= Clanculus puniceus =

Species of gastropod

Clanculus puniceus, common names the strawberry top shell or purplish clanculus, is a species of small sea snail, a marine gastropod mollusk in the family Trochidae, the top shells.

== Shell description ==
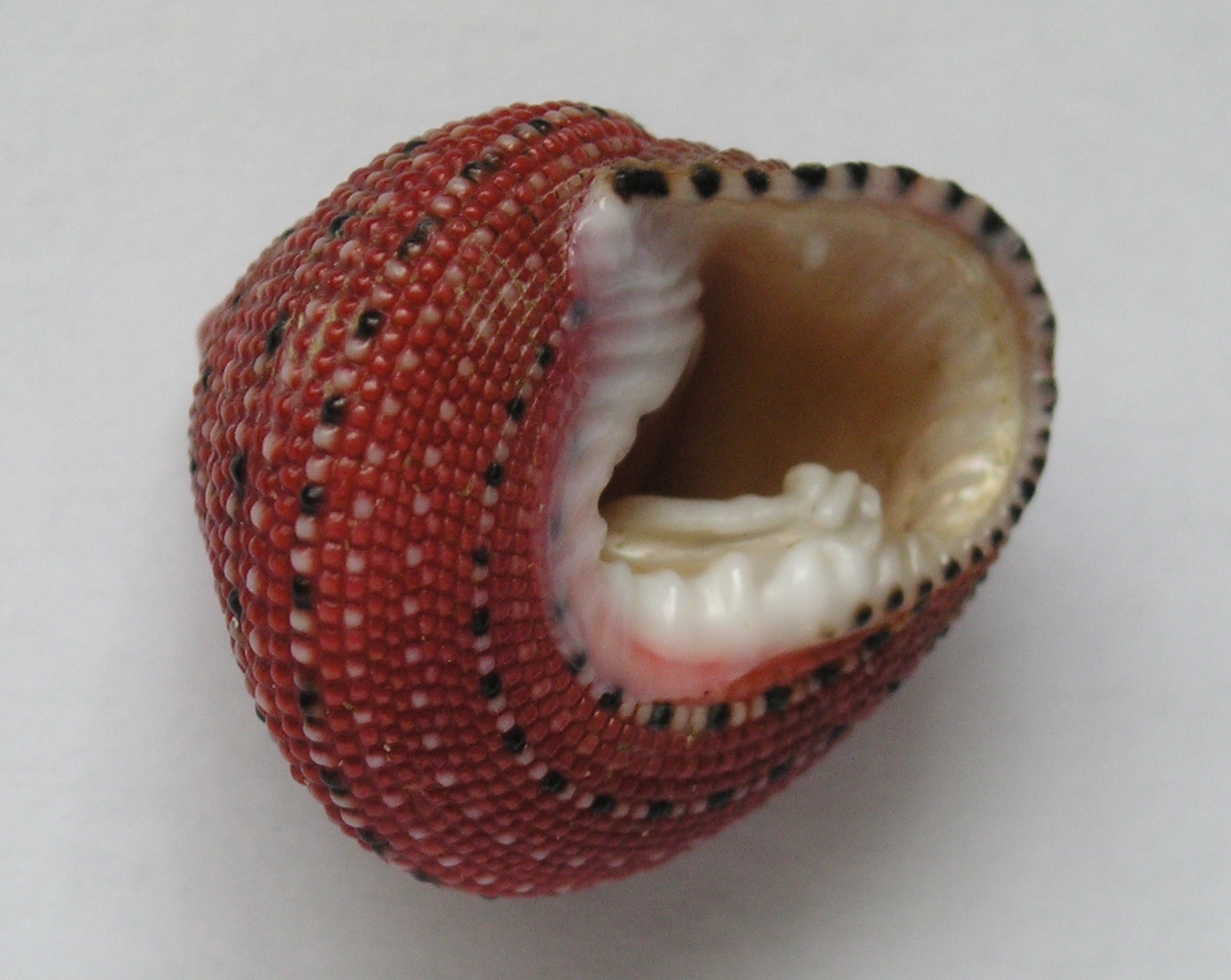
A shell of Clanculus puniceus showing the aperture

The size of an adult shell of Clanculus puniceus varies between 13 mm and 22 mm. These small, robust shells are wide-conical, low spired and have a granulated coral red surface, with a pattern of small black and white dots. In shape, size, color, and sculpture, the shell of this species is reminiscent of that of a small strawberry, hence the common name. The body whorl bears 20 or 21 cinguli, of which the 4th and 9th, as well as one or two upon the base, are articulated with black. The aperture is oval, with a strongly ridged lip. The shell is pearly (has nacre) on the inside. This species differs from Clanculus pharaonius in being more finely granulate. Moreover, the body whorl is more deflected anteriorly than in Clanculus pharonius.

== Distribution ==
This species occurs in the Indian Ocean off Madagascar, the Mascarene Basin, Mozambique, KwaZulu-Natal (South Africa) and Tanzania.

== Habitat ==
These sea snails live on rock in eulittoral zone.
