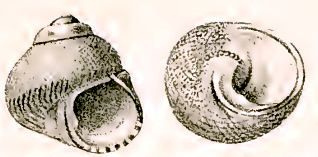
- Drawing with two views of a shell of Chlorodiloma odontis

Scientific classification
- Kingdom: Animalia
- Phylum: Mollusca
- Class: Gastropoda
- Subclass: Vetigastropoda
- Order: Trochida
- Superfamily: Trochoidea
- Family: Trochidae
- Genus: Chlorodiloma
- Species: C. odontis

Binomial name
- Chlorodiloma odontis (W. Wood, 1828)

Synonyms
- Austrocochlea odontis (W. Wood, 1828); Diloma odontis Adams, H. & Adams, A. 1854; Gibbula odontis Paetel, F. 1873; Monodonta (Chlorodiloma) odontis Tryon, G.W. 1889; Trochus odontis Wood, 1828 (original description); Gibbula tesserula Tenison-Woods, 1880

= Chlorodiloma odontis =

Species of gastropod

Chlorodiloma odontis, common name the checkered top shell, is a species of sea snail, a marine gastropod mollusk in the family Trochidae, the top snails.

== Description ==
The size of the shell varies between 10 mm and 20 mm. The globose-conic shell is more or less depressed. It is imperforate or very narrowly perforate. The sculpture is spirally finely striate, the striae becoming obsolete on the body whorl. The sharp incremental striae are microscopic. The apical whorls are white and eroded. The remainder is covered with a regular, elegant, minute reticulation formed by the intersection at right angles of two sets of obliquely descending black or bluish lines. The body whorl is subangulate at the periphery. The thin outer lip is acute, inside green, and beautifully iridescent. The arcuate columella is not dentate and is pearly edged. The umbilico-columellar area is vivid pea-green.

== Distribution ==
This marine species is endemic to Australia and occurs off South Australia, Tasmania and Victoria
