= Herpetopoma exasperatum =

Scientific classification
- Kingdom: Animalia
- Phylum: Mollusca
- Class: Gastropoda
- Subclass: Vetigastropoda
- Family: Chilodontaidae
- Genus: Herpetopoma
- Species: H. exasperatum

Binomial name
- Herpetopoma exasperatum (A. Adams, 1853)

Synonyms
- Herpetopoma fischeri (Montrouzier in Souverbie & Montrouzier, 1866); Monodonta exasperata A. Adams, 1853 (original combination)

Species of gastropod

Herpetopoma exasperatum is a species of sea snail, a marine gastropod mollusc in the family Chilodontaidae.

== Description ==
The size of the shell varies between 5 mm and 10 mm.

== Distribution ==
This marine species occurs off the Philippines, Eastern Thailand and Northern Java, Indonesia.
