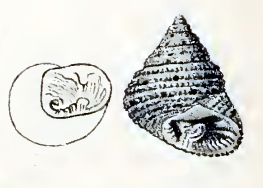
- Drawing showing two views of a shell of Clanculus margaritarius

Scientific classification
- Kingdom: Animalia
- Phylum: Mollusca
- Class: Gastropoda
- Subclass: Vetigastropoda
- Order: Trochida
- Superfamily: Trochoidea
- Family: Trochidae
- Genus: Clanculus
- Species: C. margaritarius

Binomial name
- Clanculus margaritarius (Philippi, 1849)

Synonyms
- Clanculus unedo A. Adams, 1853; Monodonta margaritaria Philippi, 1846 (original combination); Trochus margaritarius Philippi, 1849

= Clanculus margaritarius =

Species of gastropod

Clanculus margaritarius, common name the beautiful clanculus, is a species of sea snail, a marine gastropod mollusk in the family Trochidae, the top snails.

Clanculus margaritarius multipunctatus Jansen, 1995: synonym of Clanculus multipunctatus Jansen, 1995

== Description ==
=== Shell Characteristics ===
The size of the shell varies between 9 mm and 20 mm. The very solid shell has an elate-conic shape. It is narrowly false-umbilicate, red or reddish brown, dotted with black; rosy at the apex. The outlines of the spire are a little concave toward the apex. The spire contains about 7 whorls. These are nearly flat above, with linear, impressed sutures. The body whorl descends anteriorly and is encircled by about 13 or 14 granose lirae every second one, or on some specimens every one articulated with black dots. The interstices are finely spirally and obliquely striate. The base of the shell is convex. The aperture is tetragonal. The outer lip bears within a strong tubercle above, and a few plicae on the outer and lower part. The short columella is oblique, with a very slight fold above, very deeply entering the profound, extremely narrow axial pit, and at the base terminating in a large squarish trifid tooth. The parietal tract is finely wrinkled. The umbilicus is bounded by a plicate rib.

=== Coloring ===
The phylum Mollusca is a highly diverse and rich species, with an abundant amount of color variations that is beneficial to learn from. From this family of Mollusca, studies are done to try to have a better understanding of pigmentation evolution, which can answer some bigger questions about color evolutions in the natural world.

Coloring in shells can result from a multitude of factors, such as behavioral characteristics and the environment mollusks live in. Coloring in their shells can be associated with mating displays, diet, heritable traits and defense mechanisms. The coloring in Clanculus margaritarius is normally reddish brown, pinkish-red and yellowish-brown with black spots. Scientist have an advantage when using the phylum Mollusca to study color variations, they are able to use the visible coloring to search for genes that are involved in color synthesis.

== Distribution ==
This marine species has a wide distribution. It occurs in the Central and East Indian Ocean, China, East India, Indo-China, Indo-Malaysia, Japan, Loyalty Islands, Malaysia, New Caledonia, New Zealand, Oceania, Papua New Guinea, Solomon Islands, Taiwan and Queensland, and Australia.
