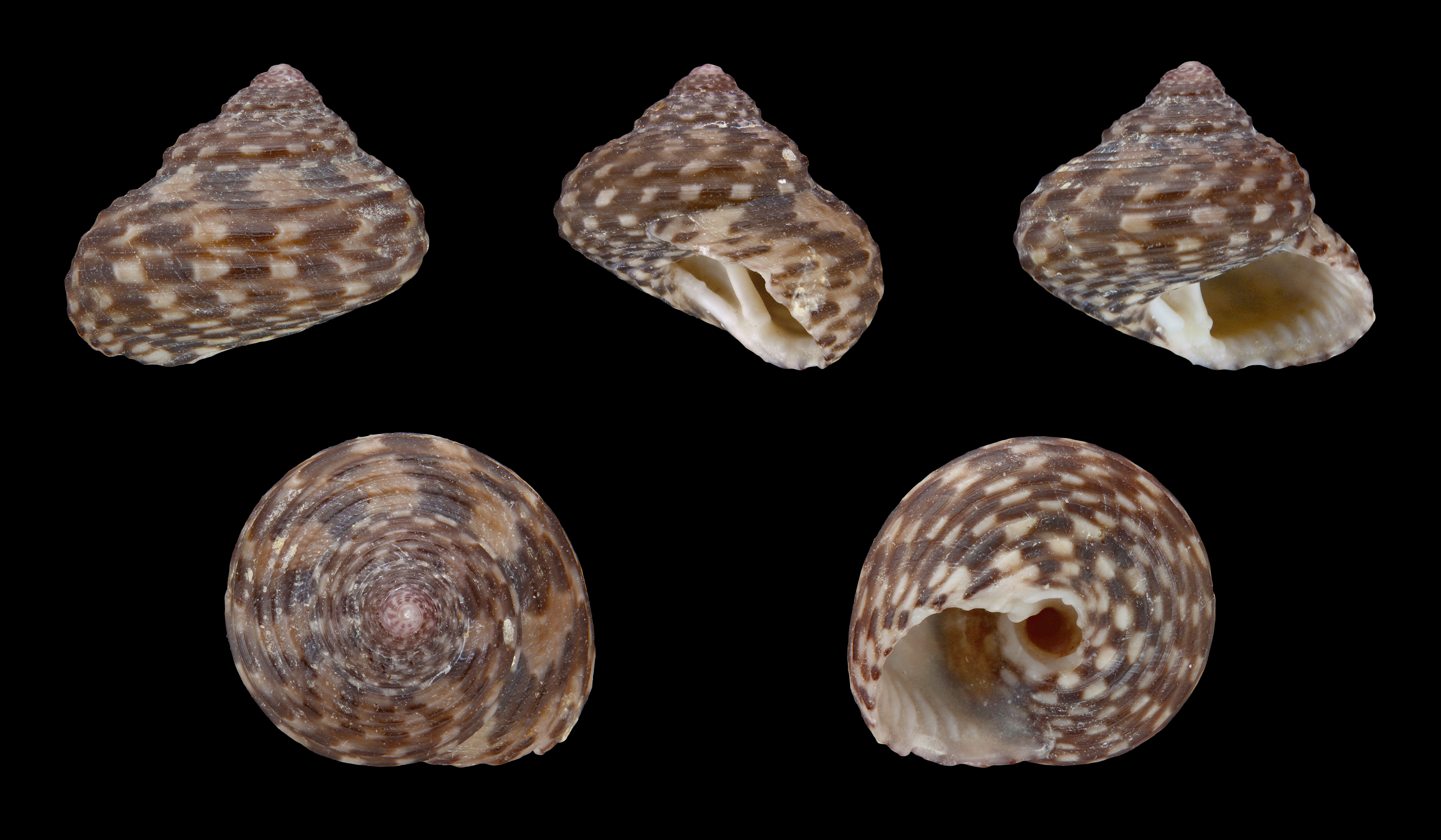

Scientific classification
- Kingdom: Animalia
- Phylum: Mollusca
- Class: Gastropoda
- Subclass: Vetigastropoda
- Order: Trochida
- Superfamily: Trochoidea
- Family: Trochidae
- Genus: Clanculus
- Species: C. jussieui

Binomial name
- Clanculus jussieui (Payraudeau, 1826)

Synonyms
- Clanculus blainvillii Cantraine, 1842; Clanculus granoliratus Monterosato, 1889; Clanculus jussieui var. marmorata Pallary, 1900; Clanculus jussieui var. roseocarnea Monterosato, 1880; Clanculus jussieui var. striata Monterosato, 1880 (dubious synonym); Clanculus (Clanculopsis) jussieui (Payraudeau, 1826); Clanculus kinzelbachi F. Nordsieck, 1982; Gibbula morio Risso, 1826; Gibbula schroeterius Risso, 1826; Monodonta glomus Philippi, 1844; Monodonta jussieui Payraudeau, 1826 (original combination)

= Clanculus jussieui =

Species of gastropod

Clanculus jussieui is a species of sea snail, a marine gastropod mollusk in the family Trochidae, the top snails.

The species was named in honor of M. Adrien-Henri de Jussieu, "professeur au Jardin du Roi."

== Description ==
The height of the shell attains 11 mm, its diameter 14 mm. The umbilicate shell has a depressed-globose conic shape. It is, polished, shining, blackish, olive or purplish brown, unicolored, dotted or tessellated with white, often with short flames of white beneath the sutures and always more or less marked with white around the umbilicus . The spire is conical. The sutures are simple and impressed. The 5 to 6 whorls are convex. The upper surface is marked with obsolete, frequently almost imperceptible line, the interstices between them finely spirally striate. The base of the shell is smoother, and lightly concentrically marked around the center. The aperture is rounded. The outer and basal margins are crenulated within. The columella bears a small tooth above and below, concave between them, deeply entering the umbilicus, but inserted on its edge. The umbilicus is rather deep, smooth within and bordered by an irregularly crenulated rib.

== Distribution ==
THis species occurs in the Mediterranean Sea and in the Atlantic Ocean off Portugal.
