= Monodonta australis =

Scientific classification
- Kingdom: Animalia
- Phylum: Mollusca
- Class: Gastropoda
- Subclass: Vetigastropoda
- Order: Trochida
- Superfamily: Trochoidea
- Family: Trochidae
- Genus: Monodonta
- Species: M. australis

Binomial name
- Monodonta australis (Lamarck, 1816)

Synonyms
- Trochus australis Philippi

Species of gastropod

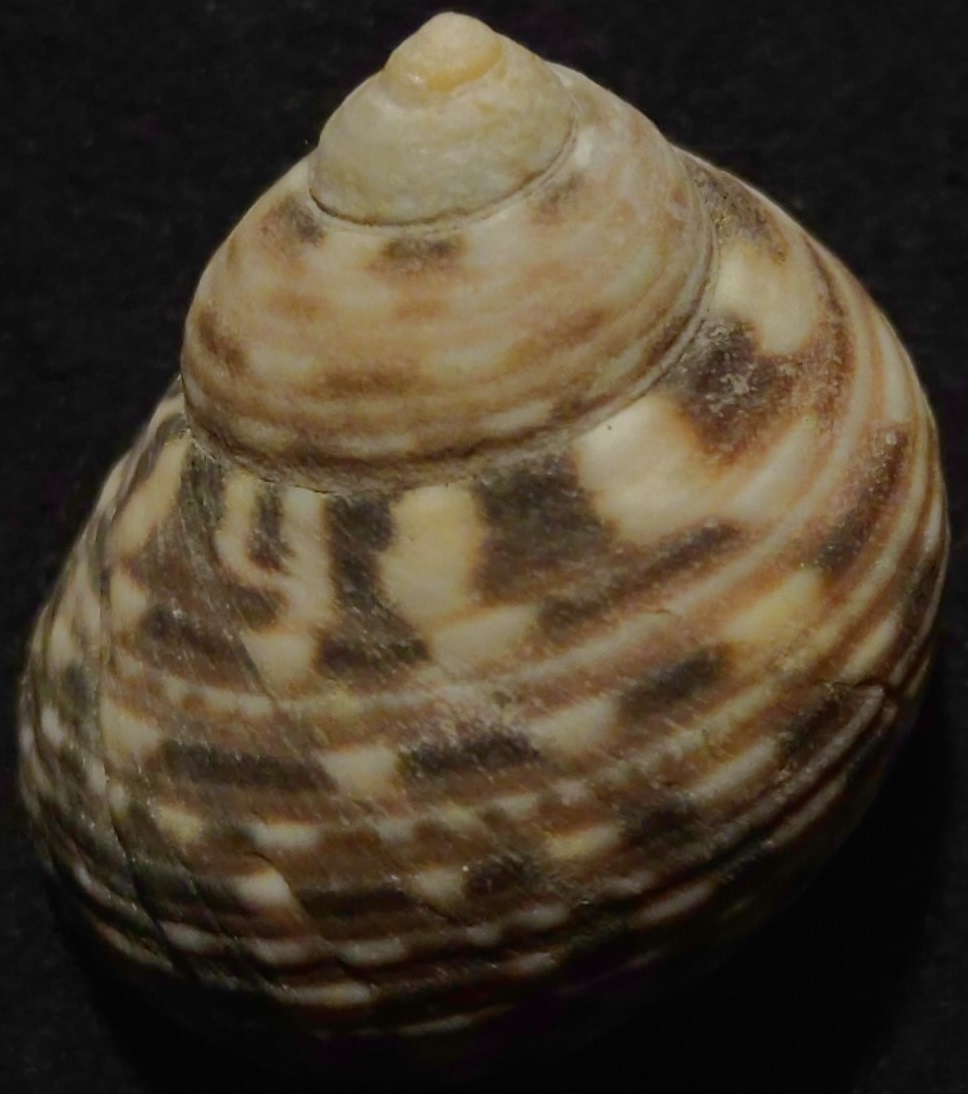

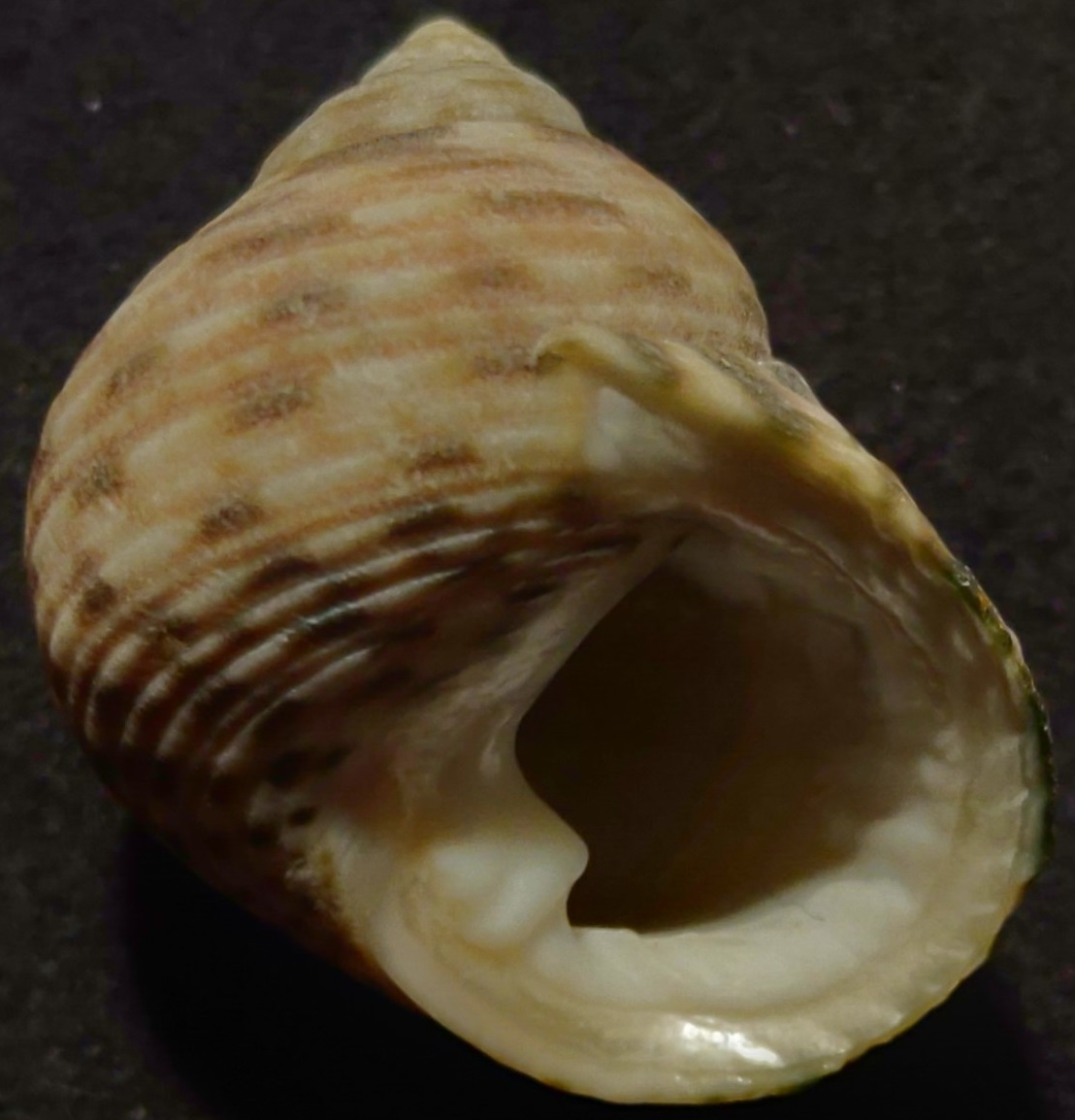

Monodonta australis, common name the toothed topshell, is a species of sea snail, a marine gastropod mollusk in the family Trochidae, the top snails.

== Description ==
The size of the shell varies between 12 mm and 35 mm. The shell is similar to Monodonta labio, but with rounder whorls, more marked sutures and with lower lirae. It is not granulose. It is tessellated with black and grayish or greenish. The penultimate whorl is subangulate by the prominence of its central rib. The columella is much less strongly dentate than in Monodonta labio, and the notch or canal below it shallow. The basal plicae are less developed than in Monodontia labio.

== Distribution ==
This marine species occurs off South Africa and in the Indian Ocean off Madagascar, Aldabra and the Mascarene Basin; also off Japan.
