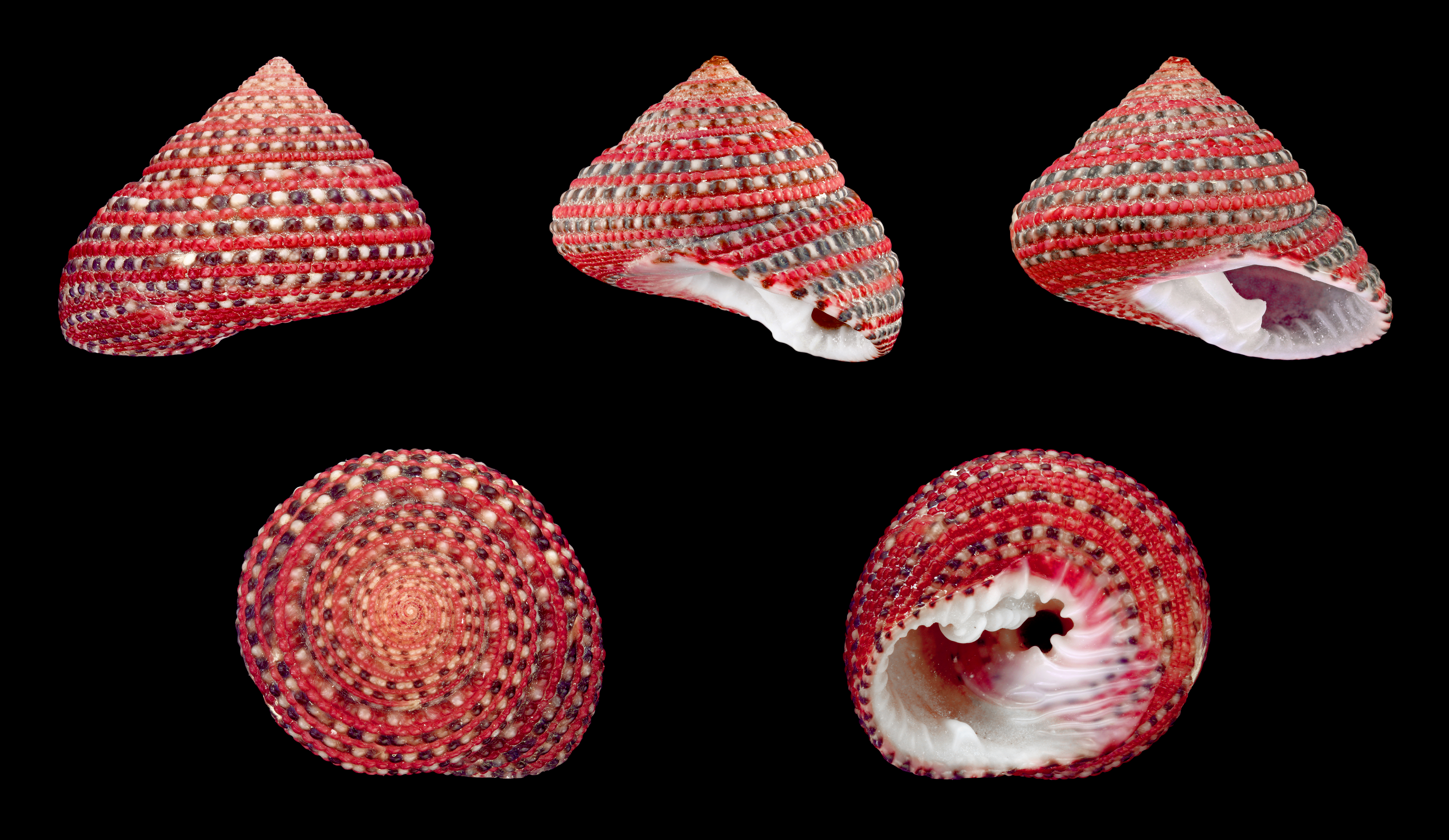

Scientific classification
- Kingdom: Animalia
- Phylum: Mollusca
- Class: Gastropoda
- Subclass: Vetigastropoda
- Order: Trochida
- Superfamily: Trochoidea
- Family: Trochidae
- Genus: Clanculus
- Species: C. pharaonius

Binomial name
- Clanculus pharaonius (Linnaeus, 1758)

Synonyms
- Monodonta pharaonis Woodward; Trochus pharaonius Linnaeus, 1758; Trochus stefaninii Nardini, 1934

= Clanculus pharaonius =

Species of gastropod

Clanculus pharaonius, common name the strawberry topshell, is a species of sea snail, a marine gastropod mollusk in the family Trochidae, the top snails.

It is the type species of this genus.

== Description ==
The size of the shell varies between 13 mm and 25 mm. The very strong and solid shell has a depressed conoidal shape with a rounded periphery and a profoundly umbilicate axis. It is densely granulate. The overall coloration of the whorls and the spire is dark strawberry red or coral red. The spire is conoidal with scarcely convex outlines. The about 6 whorls are somewhat convex and separated by well impressed sutures. The body whorl is large and deflected anteriorly. It bears 18 or 19 crowded, closely granose cinguli, of which the 1st, 3d, 5th, 7th, 9th and two upon the base are composed of alternate black and white granules. Upon the base of the shell the granulation is finer. The base is convex, a trifle indented toward the center. The oblique aperture is subquadrangonal. The peristome has a marginal row of black and white dots. The outer lip is plicate within, with a short plicifbrm tubercle above. The basal lip, the outer margin of the umbilicus and the parietal wall are provided with wrinkle-like plicae. The columella is very oblique, terminating below in a square prominence, contorted above, and inserted on the side of the umbilicus. The umbilicus is white, and smooth within the strongly radiately plicate marginal rib, smooth.

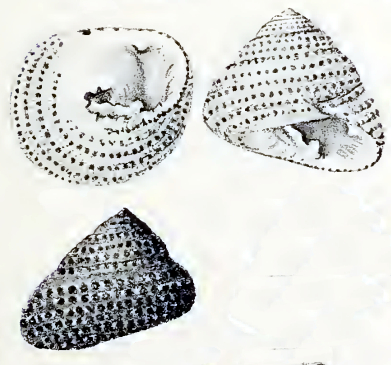
Drawing showing three views of a shell of Clanculus pharaonius

== Distribution ==
Widely occurring in the shallow subtidal zone throughout the tropics of the Indo-Pacific region, from Hawaiian Islands to the Red Sea, the Gulf of Oman and Madagascar.
