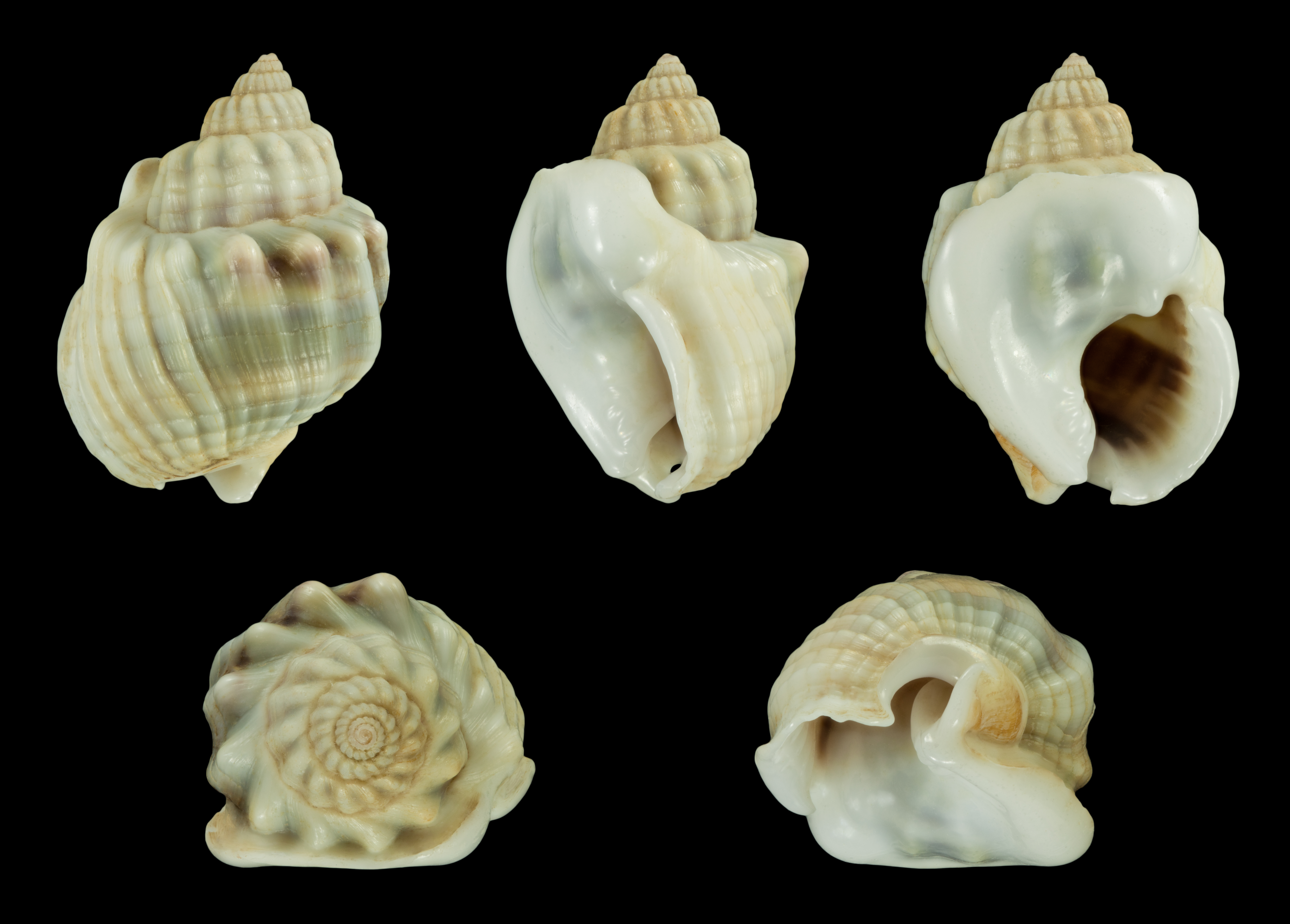
- Five views of a shell of Nassarius arcularia

Scientific classification
- Kingdom: Animalia
- Phylum: Mollusca
- Class: Gastropoda
- Subclass: Caenogastropoda
- Order: Neogastropoda
- Family: Nassariidae
- Genus: Nassarius
- Species: N. arcularia

Binomial name
- Nassarius arcularia (Linnaeus, 1758)

Synonyms
- list of synonyms: Arcularia coronata Link, 1807; Buccinum arcularia Linnaeus, 1758 (original combination); Distorsio arcularia Röding, 1798; Nassa (Arcularia) scalariformis Mörch, 1852 (invalid: junior secondary homonym of Buccinum scalariforme Kiener, 1834); Nassa (Nassa) arcularia (Linnaeus, 1758); Nassa arcularia (Linnaeus, 1758); Nassarius (Nassarius) arcularia (Linnaeus, 1758) · accepted, alternate representation; Nassarius (Nassarius) arcularius (Linnaeus, 1758); Nassarius (Arcularia) coronata Link, H.F., 1807; Nassarius arcularia arcularia (Linnaeus, 1758) · accepted, alternate representation; Nassarius arcularia arcularius (Linnaeus, 1758) (wrong gender agreement (arcularia is a noun in apposition)); Nassarius pullus Habe & Kosuge, 1966; Nassarius rumphii Deshayes, G.P. & H. Milne-Edwards, 1844; Nassarius scalariformis Mörch, O.A.L., 1852

= Nassarius arcularia =

Species of gastropod

Nassarius arcularia, the casket nassa or the little box dog whelk, is a species of sea snail, a marine gastropod mollusk in the family Nassariidae, the Nassa mud snails or dog whelks. It is found in tropical and subtropical coastal waters across the world, inhabiting muddy areas close to the shoreline.

There are two subspecies :

- Nassarius arcularia arcularia (Linnaeus, 1758): accepted as Nassarius arcularia.
- Nassarius arcularia plicatus (Röding, 1798)

Subspecies brought into synonymy

- Nassarius arcularius arcularius (Linnaeus, 1758) accepted as Nassarius arcularia arcularia (Linnaeus, 1758)

== Description ==
The shell size varies between 18 mm and 40 mm.

The ovate, ventricose shell is pretty thick. It is composed of six or seven flattened whorls, angular above, and the lowest of which forms of itself half the shell. This body whorl is very much inflated, and furnished externally with thick, longitudinal, distant folds, which are intersected by transverse striae. The upper extremity of each fold is terminated by a conical tubercle, sometimes separated from it by a transverse stria which divides it superficially into two. The upper whorls are convex, loaded also with compact folds and transverse striae. But in these the tubercles are slightly perceptible, and upon some specimens not at all. The white aperture is ovate, and terminates at the summit by an excavated notch at the top of the outer lip, and by a fold of the inner lip. The depth of the cavity is brown or of a violet-color, marked with transverse, whitish bands. The outer lip is thin upon the edge, denticulated in a part of its length, deeply striated internally. The columella is arcuated, covered by the inner lip, which is enlarged upon the body of the shell, and forms a semicircular callosity, often thick, polished, marked at the lower part by transverse guttules, and terminated by an oblique keel, which is prolonged to a point. The color of this shell is generally ash, externally. But sometimes it is bluish, ornamented with one or several transverse, white or brown bands. Another brown band extends always between the tubercles of the body whorl. The operculum is oval and rounded, membranous and denticulated upon one of its edges.

This shell, which is very common, has a thickness of up to 3 centimetres (1.2 in), vary in form. The whorls are more or less elongated, the longitudinal folds and the transverse striae, sometimes completely disappear upon the body whorl, nevertheless, tubercles remain which cover this shell, and the furrows at the base, which are very well marked. The coloring varies equally, some specimens are entirely white. Others are of a uniform reddish or chestnut color. The young of this species have folds and striae much more prominent. In them the lip is thin, smooth, and the callosity does not exist upon the columella.

== Distribution ==
This species occurs in the Indian Ocean off East Africa, Madagascar and Mozambique and in the Central and Western Pacific Ocean; off East India, Sri Lanka, the Philippines, Indonesia, Ryukyu Islands, Papua New Guinea, New Caledonia, New Hebrides, Fiji, Tonga Islands and Australia (Northern Territory, Queensland).

== Bibliography ==
- Linnaeus, C. 1758. Systemae naturae per regna tria naturae, secundum classes, ordines, genera, species, cum characteribus, differetiis, synonymis, locis.v. Holmiae : Laurentii Salvii 824 pp.
- Mörch, O.A.L. 1852. Catalogus Conchyliorum quae reliquit d. Alphonso d'Aguirra & Gadea Comes de Yoldi, regis daniae cubiculariorum princeps, ordinis dannebrogici in prima classe & ordinis caroli Tertii eques. Part 1. Cephalophora. Copenhagen : Hafinae Vol. 1 170 pp.
- Dautzenberg, Ph. (1929). Mollusques testacés marins de Madagascar. Faune des Colonies Francaises, Tome III
- Cernohorsky W. O. (1984). Systematics of the Family Nassariidae (Mollusca: Gastropoda). Bulletin of the Auckland Institute and Museum 14: 1–356
- Wilson, B. 1994. Australian Marine Shells. Prosobranch Gastropods. Kallaroo, WA : Odyssey Publishing Vol. 2 370 pp.
