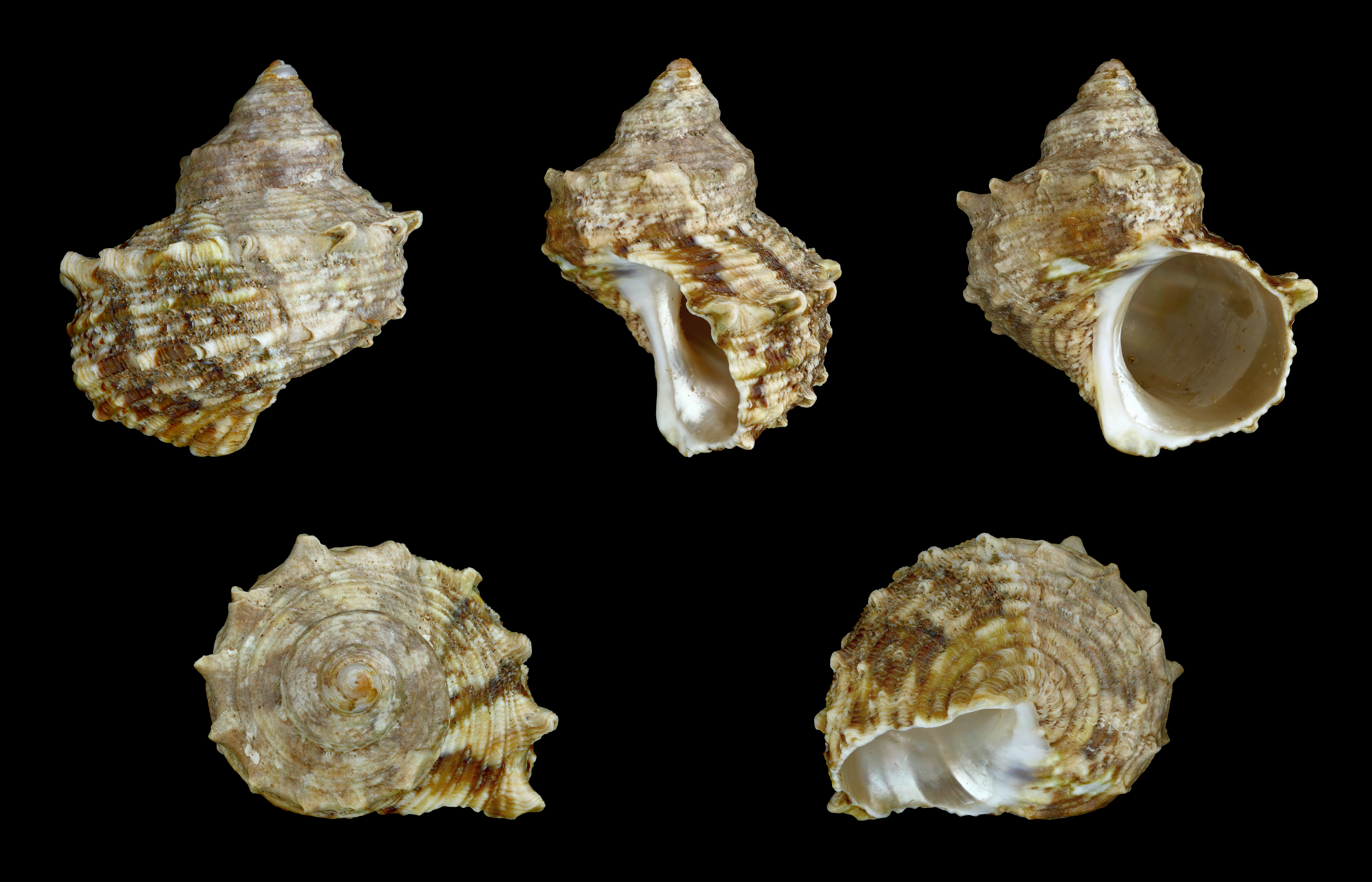
- Five views of a shell of Turbo radiatus

Scientific classification
- Kingdom: Animalia
- Phylum: Mollusca
- Class: Gastropoda
- Subclass: Vetigastropoda
- Order: Trochida
- Family: Turbinidae
- Genus: Turbo
- Species: T. radiatus

Binomial name
- Turbo radiatus Gmelin, 1791

Synonyms
- Turbo (Aspilaturbo) radiatus Gmelin, 1791; Turbo (Marmarostoma) radiatus Gmelin, 1791; Turbo chemnitzianus Reeve, 1848; Turbo lapidifera Röding, 1798; Turbo radiatus f. chemnitziana Reeve, 1848; Turbo radiatus f. spinosa Gmelin, 1791; Turbo spinosus Gmelin, 1791; Turbo tuberculatus Kiener, 1847; Turbo tumidulus, Reeve, 1848

= Turbo radiatus =

Species of gastropod

Turbo radiatus is a species of sea snail, a marine gastropod mollusk in the family Turbinidae, the turban snails.

Some authors place the name in the subgenus Turbo (Marmarostoma).

== Description ==
The size of the shell varies between 35 mm and 50 mm. The imperforate, solid shell has an ovate-conic shape. Its color pattern is whitish, streaked and maculated with brown or green, the darker color often predominating. The conic spire is acute. The 5-6 whorls are convex, irregularly spirally lirate and finely regularly lamellosely longitudinally striate;. They are subcarinate above. The sutures are subcanaliculate. The body whorl is usually biangulate, with a coronal and one or two submedian lirae prominent and armed with more or less numerous vaulted scales or spines. The aperture measures about half the length of the shell. It is pearly white within. The crenate lip is slightly produced at its base. The umbilical region is sometimes slightly indented.

The operculum is flat inside, with five whorls and a subcentral nucleus. Its outer surface is finely tuberculate, cinereous or pale olive.

== Distribution ==
This species occurs in the Red Sea and in the Indian Ocean off Aldabra, Madagascar and the Mascarene Basin; in the Pacific Ocean off the Philippines; off Australia (Northern Territory, Queensland); in the Eastern Mediterranean Sea.
