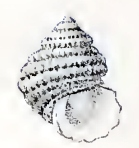
- Drawing with an apertural view of a shell of Vaceuchelus clathratus

Scientific classification
- Kingdom: Animalia
- Phylum: Mollusca
- Class: Gastropoda
- Subclass: Vetigastropoda
- Family: Chilodontaidae
- Genus: Vaceuchelus
- Species: V. clathratus

Binomial name
- Vaceuchelus clathratus (A. Adams, 1853)

Synonyms
- Euchelus clathratus (A. Adams, 1853); Herpetopoma clathratum (A. Adams, 1853); Minolia subplicata Nevill; Monodonta clathrata A. Adams, 1853; Vaceuchelus banffius E. Donovan, 1804

= Vaceuchelus clathratus =

Species of gastropod

Vaceuchelus clathratus is a species of sea snail, a marine gastropod mollusc in the family Chilodontaidae.

== Description ==
The height of the shell attains 6½ mm. The dull white, imperforate shell has an ovate-conic, subventricose shape. The apex is rather obtuse. The shell is ornamented with strong spiral subnodose ribs, decussated by elevated rib-striae cutting the interstices into square pits, of which there are 3 or 4 series on the third whorl, 4 on the penultimate, and 7 on the last; The five, rounded whorls are separated by a deep, subcanaliculate suture. The rounded, almost pearly aperture is oblique. The outer lip is duplicate. Its edge is acute, crenulated, and sulcate inside. The simple columella is vertical.

== Distribution ==
This marine species occurs in the Indo-West Pacific; off the Philippines, New Caledonia and Australia (Northern Territory, Queensland, Western Australia)
