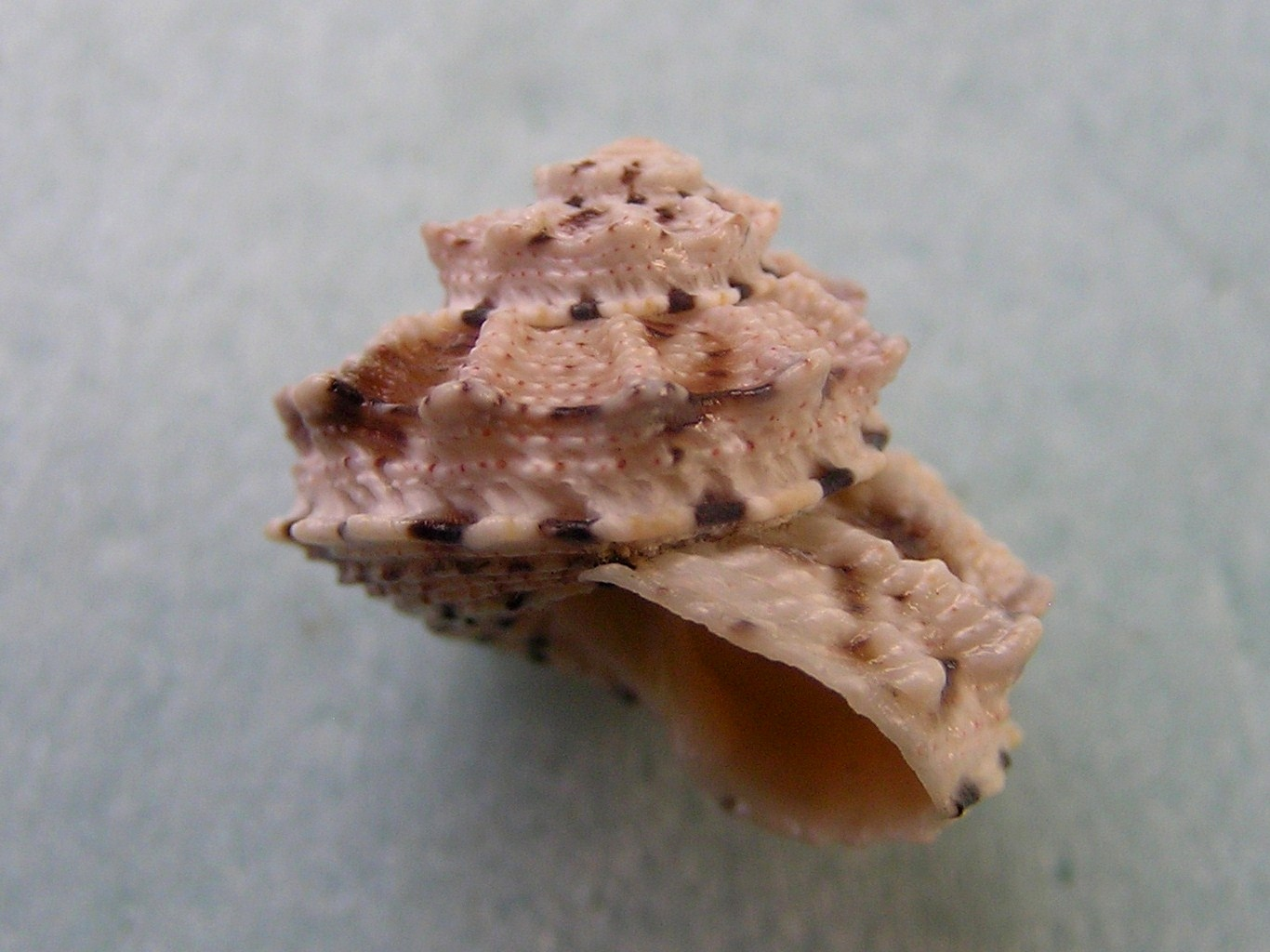
- a shell of Rubritrochus declivis

Scientific classification
- Kingdom: Animalia
- Phylum: Mollusca
- Class: Gastropoda
- Subclass: Vetigastropoda
- Order: Trochida
- Superfamily: Trochoidea
- Family: Trochidae
- Genus: Rubritrochus
- Species: R. declivis

Binomial name
- Rubritrochus declivis (Forsskål in Niebuhr, 1775)

Synonyms
- Forskalia declivis (Forskål, 1775); Gibbula declivis (Forskål, 1775); Monodonta aegyptiaca Lamarck, 1822; Trochus aegyptius Gmelin, 1791; Trochus declivis Philippi, Turbo aegyptius Gmelin, 1791; Turbo declivis Forskål, 1775 (original combination)

= Rubritrochus declivis =

Species of gastropod

Rubritrochus declivis, the sloping gibbula, is a species of sea snail, a marine gastropod mollusk in the family Trochidae, the top snails.

== Description ==
The shell grows to a length of 24 mm. The umbilicate, conical shell is solid. It is whitish, and maculated with purplish or yellowish. The six whorls are bicarinate at the periphery, all over spirally lirate. The upper surface is strongly radiately costate. The folds terminate at the periphery in short spines. The periphery is encircled by a channel bearing a median riblet. The base of the shell is convex, bearing 4 or 5 strong concentric lirae. The rounded aperture is smooth within. The columella is sinuous, arcuate, and dentate at the base. The umbilicus is moderate deep.

This species is separated from all others in this genus by the scalariform spires, strongly plicate upper surface, and the deep channel encircling the periphery.

== Distribution ==
This species occurs in the Red Sea and the Gulf of Aqaba
