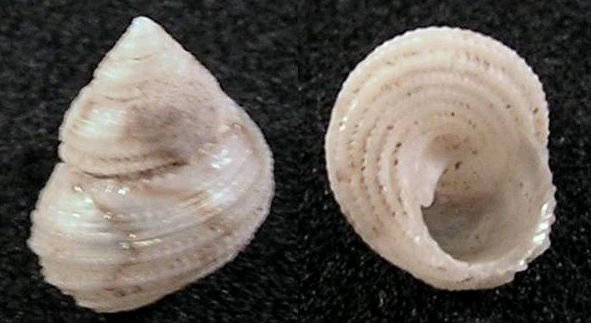
- Two views of a shell of Herpetopoma instrictum

Scientific classification
- Kingdom: Animalia
- Phylum: Mollusca
- Class: Gastropoda
- Subclass: Vetigastropoda
- Family: Chilodontaidae
- Genus: Herpetopoma
- Species: H. instrictum

Binomial name
- Herpetopoma instrictum (Gould, 1849)

Synonyms
- Euchelus bourcierei (Crosse, 1863); Euchelus instrictus Gould, A.A., 1849; Monodonta alveolata A. Adams, 1853; Monodonta bourcierei Crosse, 1863; Trochus (Monodonta) instrictus Gould, 1849 (original combination); Turcica instricta Gould, 1864

= Herpetopoma instrictum =

Species of gastropod

Herpetopoma instrictum, common name the basket-like false top shell, is a species of sea snail, a marine gastropod mollusc in the family Chilodontaidae.

== Description ==
The size of the shell varies between 3 mm and 10 mm. The small, solid, elevated shell has an ovate-conic shape. It is white, with a series of about 10 rufous spots near the suture. The five whorls form a conical spire. They are ventricose, with delicate, highly elevated spiral rib-striae,- of which there are about 5 on the upper and 10 on the last whorl. The surface of the ribs is slightly tuberculous, and the last one overhangs the succeeding whorl so as to form a broad deep channel at the suture. The interspaces have about the same width as the ribs, and are beautifully barred with close-set laminae. The base of the shell isconvex, with a small deep scalariform umbilicus, sculptured like the spire. The aperture is obliquely semicircular. The outer lip is crenulated by the ribs, and conspicuously sulcate within. The columella is sharp, oblique, armed with a fully developed sharp tooth at the base, succeeded by a deep basal notch.

== Distribution ==
This marine species occurs off Japan, the Philippines, New Caledonia and Fiji.
