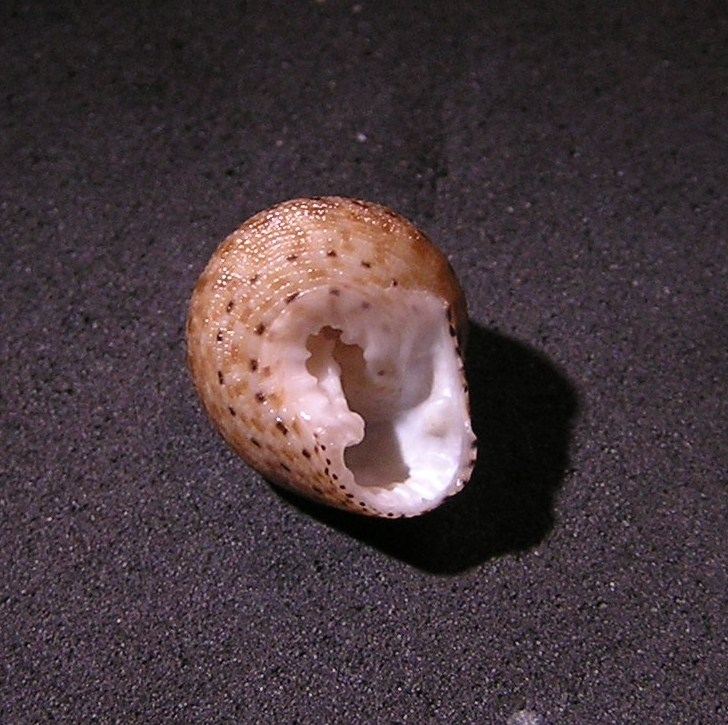
- Clanculus atricatena

Scientific classification
- Kingdom: Animalia
- Phylum: Mollusca
- Class: Gastropoda
- Subclass: Vetigastropoda
- Order: Trochida
- Superfamily: Trochoidea
- Family: Trochidae
- Genus: Clanculus
- Species: C. atricatena

Binomial name
- Clanculus atricatena Tomlin, 1921

Synonyms
- Clanculus (Clanculus) atricatena Tomlin, 1921; Clanculus kraussi G.B. Sowerby, 1897; Clanculus puniceus Krauss, 1848

= Clanculus atricatena =

Species of gastropod

Clanculus atricatena, common name the black-chained topshell, is a species of sea snail, a marine gastropod mollusk in the family Trochidae, the top snails.

== Description ==
The size of an adult shell varies between 15 mm and 20 mm in diameter. The umbilical shell has a broadly conical shape. The body whorl is rounded at its periphery. The umbilicus is wide and is bordered by a callus ridge with small nodules.

== Distribution ==
This marine species is found off the coast of Transkei, South Africa.
