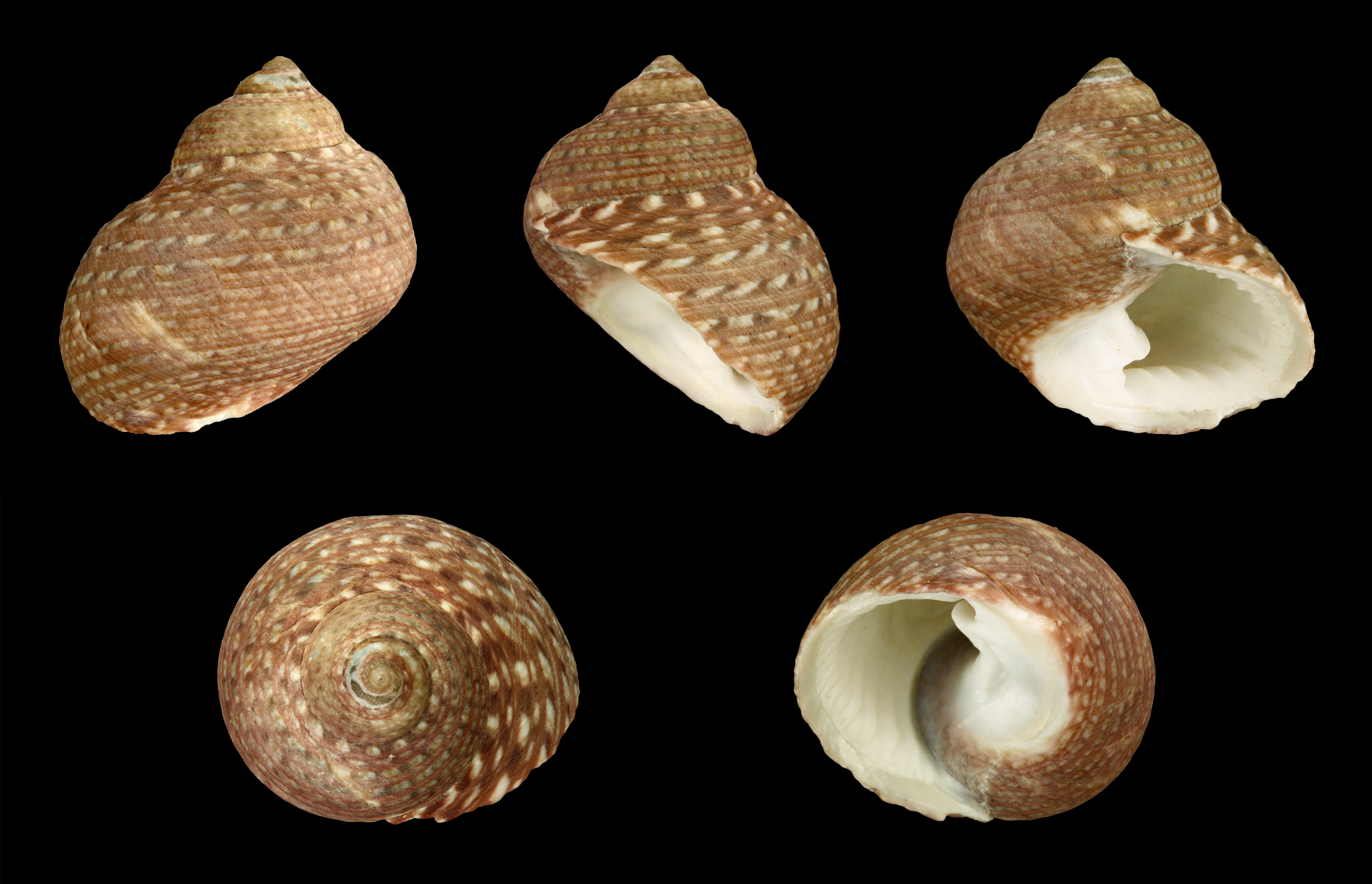
- Shell of Monodonta canalifera

Scientific classification
- Kingdom: Animalia
- Phylum: Mollusca
- Class: Gastropoda
- Subclass: Vetigastropoda
- Order: Trochida
- Superfamily: Trochoidea
- Family: Trochidae
- Genus: Monodonta
- Species: M. canalifera

Binomial name
- Monodonta canalifera Lamarck, 1816

Synonyms
- Trochus canaliferus Philippi; Trochus parvus Troschel in Philippi

= Monodonta canalifera =

Species of gastropod

Monodonta canalifera, common name the canal monodont, is a species of sea snail, a marine gastropod mollusk in the family Trochidae, the top snails.

== Description ==
The size of the shell varies between 18 mm and 30 mm. The shell is similar to the Monodonta australis, but with more convex, rounded whorls, upon the last of which the spiral lirae become more or less obsolete. The lirae are more distinct upon the upper whorls, and are smooth, with narrow interstices. The color is reddish, purplish or green, the lirae usually articulated with white, but sometimes unicolored. The outer lip is more curved and more finely crenulate within than that of Monodonta labio. The columella is short, squarely dentate at its base. Its edge is more or less rugose, and separated from the columellar area by a deep narrow straight sulcus, extending from the place of the umbilicus to the notch at base of columella. The basal notch is deep and divided by a small denticle in the middle.

== Distribution ==
This marine species occurs in the Red Sea and in the Western Pacific.
