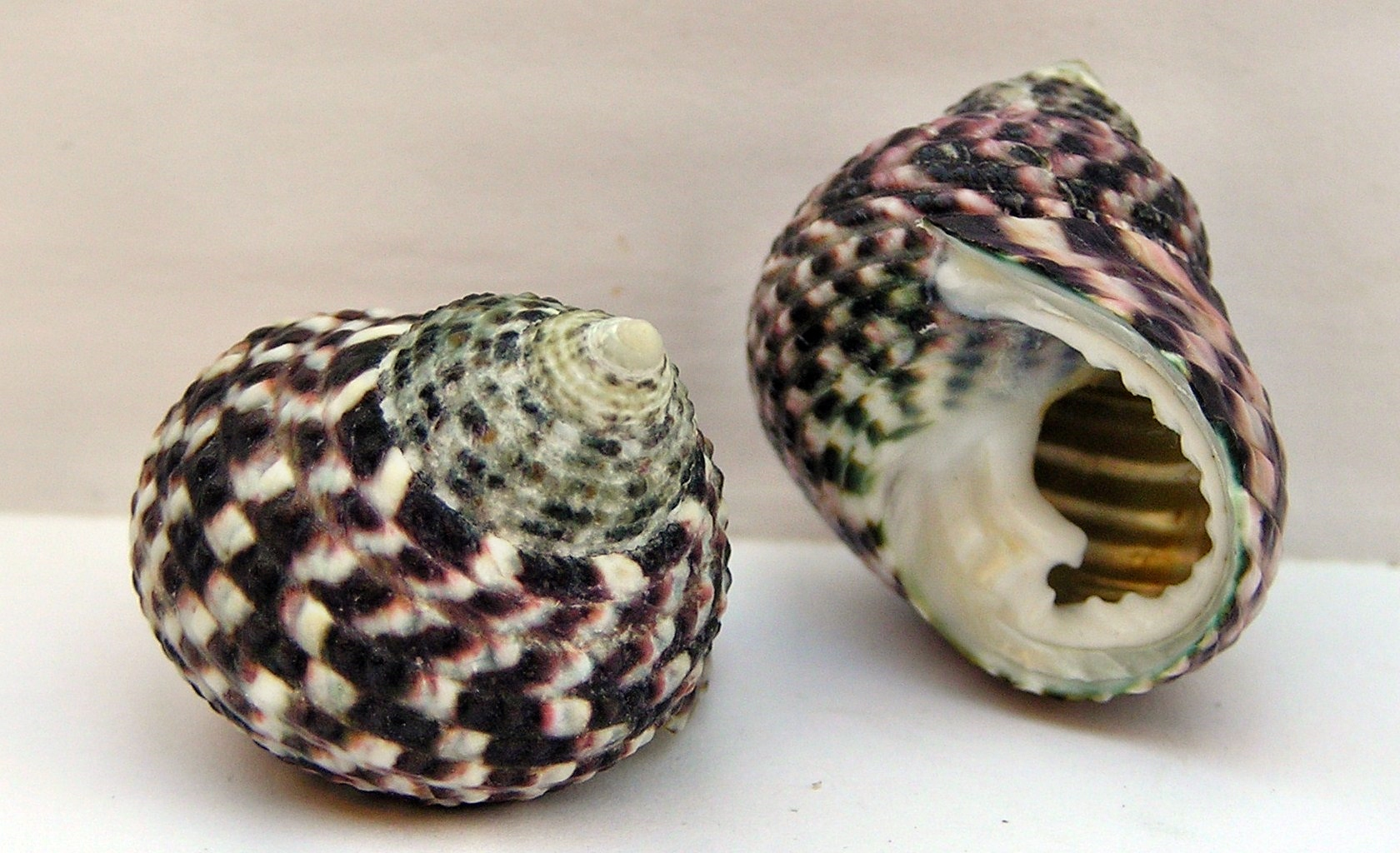
- Monodonta labio

Scientific classification
- Kingdom: Animalia
- Phylum: Mollusca
- Class: Gastropoda
- Subclass: Vetigastropoda
- Order: Trochida
- Superfamily: Trochoidea
- Family: Trochidae
- Genus: Monodonta
- Species: M. labio

Binomial name
- Monodonta labio (Linnaeus, 1758)

Synonyms
- Trochus labio Linnaeus, 1758 (basionym); Trochus novaezeelandica Röding, P.F., 1798; Monodonta immanis Fischer, 1880; Monodonta labio granulata Pilsbry, H.A., 1890; Monodonta melaurchelonis Philippi; Monodonta tuberculata A. Adams, 1853

= Monodonta labio =

Species of gastropod

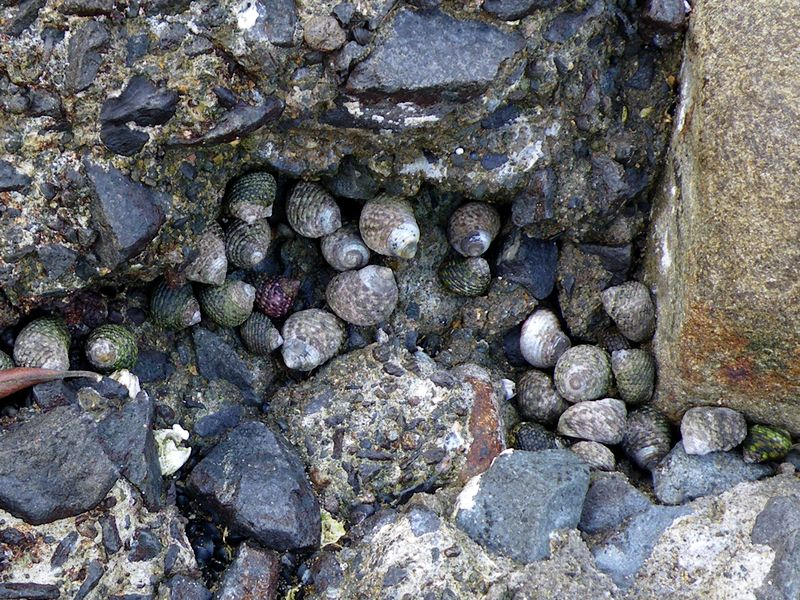
Monodonta labio

Monodonta labio, common name the toothed top shell or the lipped periwinkle, is a species of sea snail, a marine gastropod mollusk in the family Trochidae, the top snails.

== Distribution ==
This species occurs in the Indian Ocean off Madagascar and the Mascarene basin and in the Western Pacific and off the Philippines and commonly seen in Hong Kong near tide line.

== Description ==
The length of the shell size varies between 15 mm and 45 mm. The shell is heavy and coarse with rough, grained surface with moderate sutures between rounded whorls. The body whorl is swollen and the penultimate whorl somewhat less. The shell shows a rounded keel (a spiral ridge marking a change of slope) and an umbilicus sealed with a callus. The apex is often worn away in adults. The columella has a prominent, blunt tooth. The inner edge of the outer lip shows a number of smaller knobs. The aperture has a nacreous interior. The color of the shell varies from a dark reddish brown to pale brown, with spiraled dashes of cream or pink.

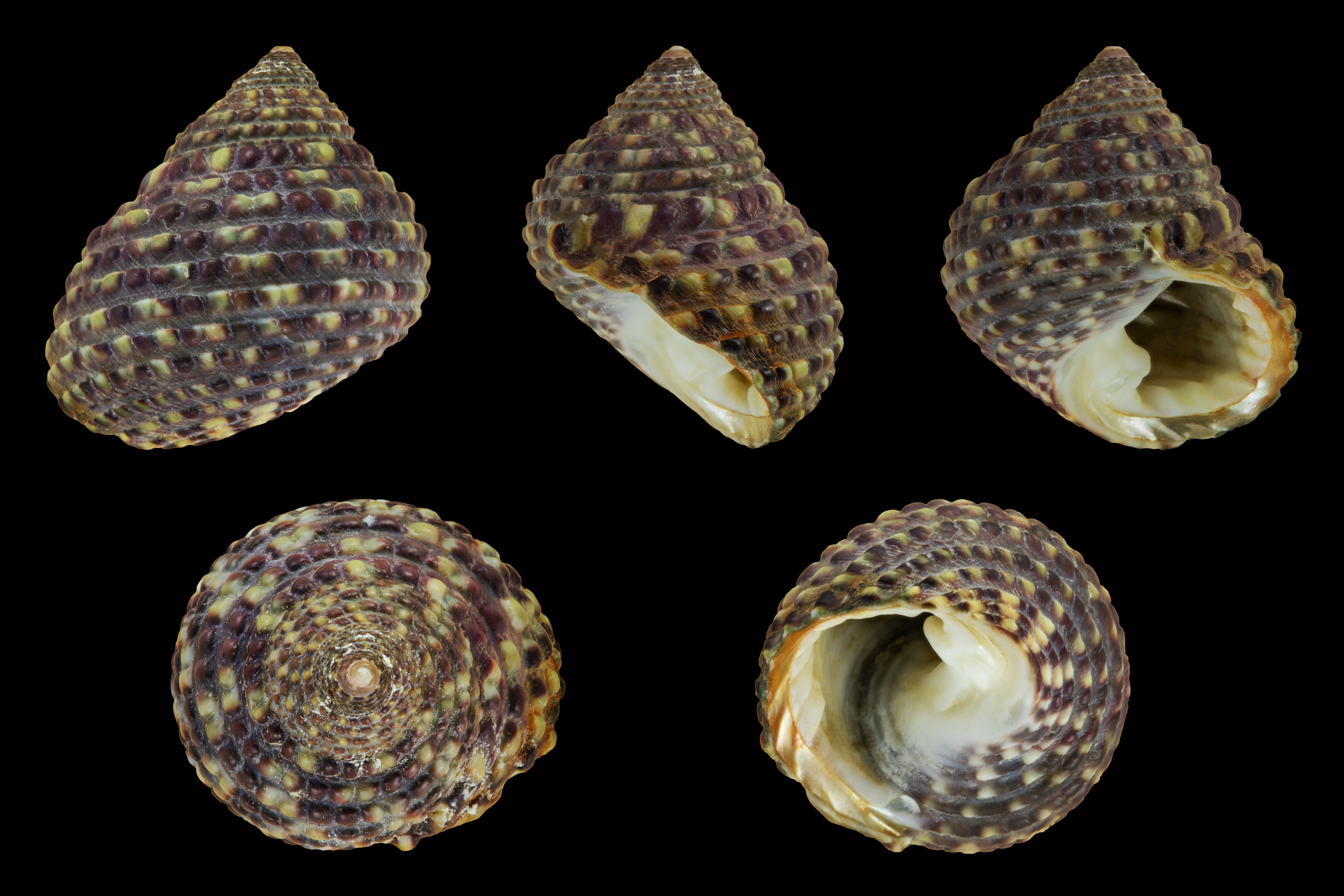

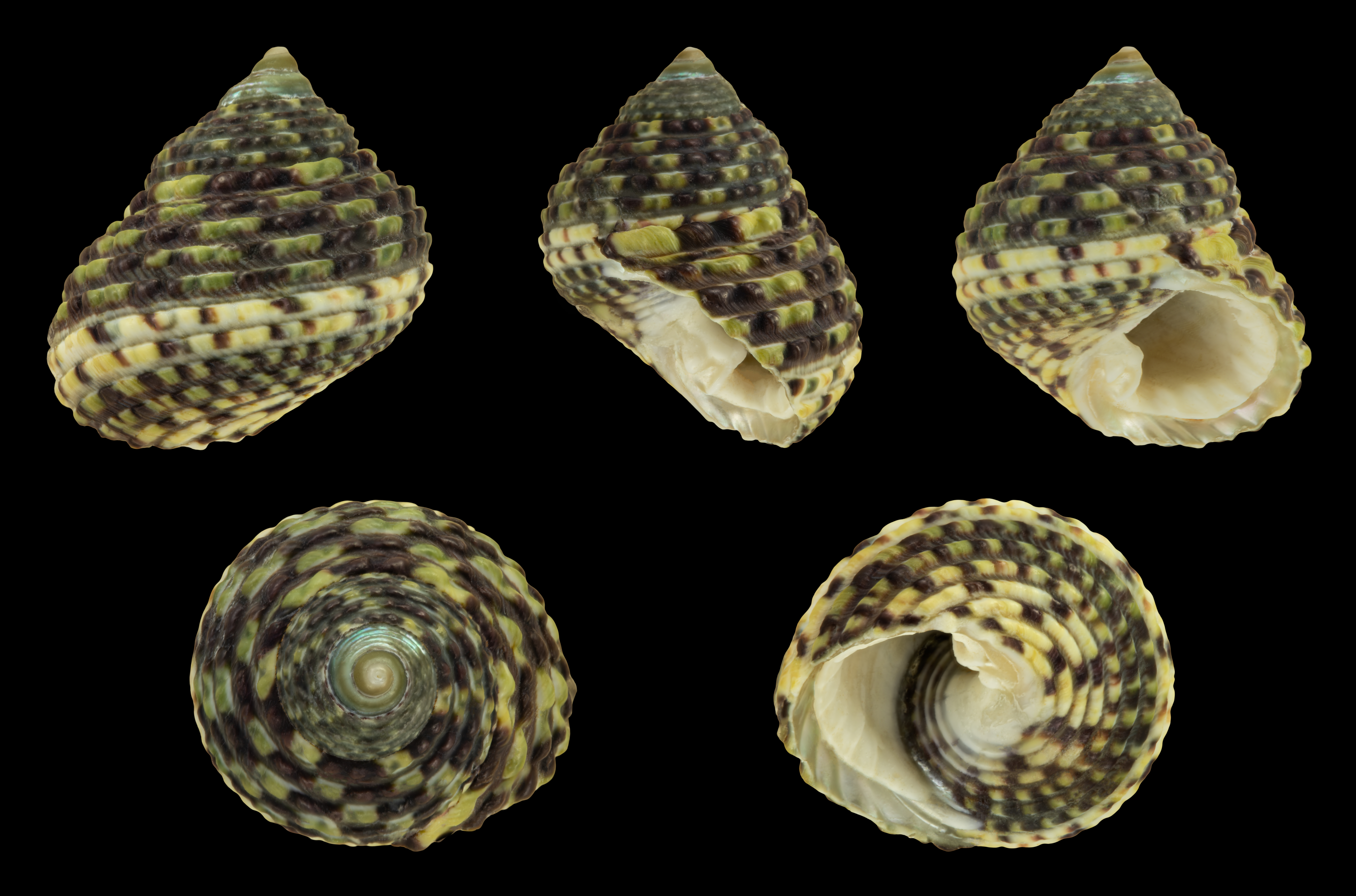

== Distribution ==
This marine species occurs over a wide range in Central and East Indian Ocean, Indo-China, Indo-Malaysian Oceania, the Philippines; the Persian Gulf, West Indian Ocean to Micronesia, Western Pacific, Micronesia and Australia (Northern Territory, Queensland, Western Australia)

== Habitat ==
This snail lives on or under rocks and coral in the lower intertidal zone. But it tolerates a wide variety of substrata.

== Feeding habits ==
This species is a herbivorous snail grazing on microalgae
