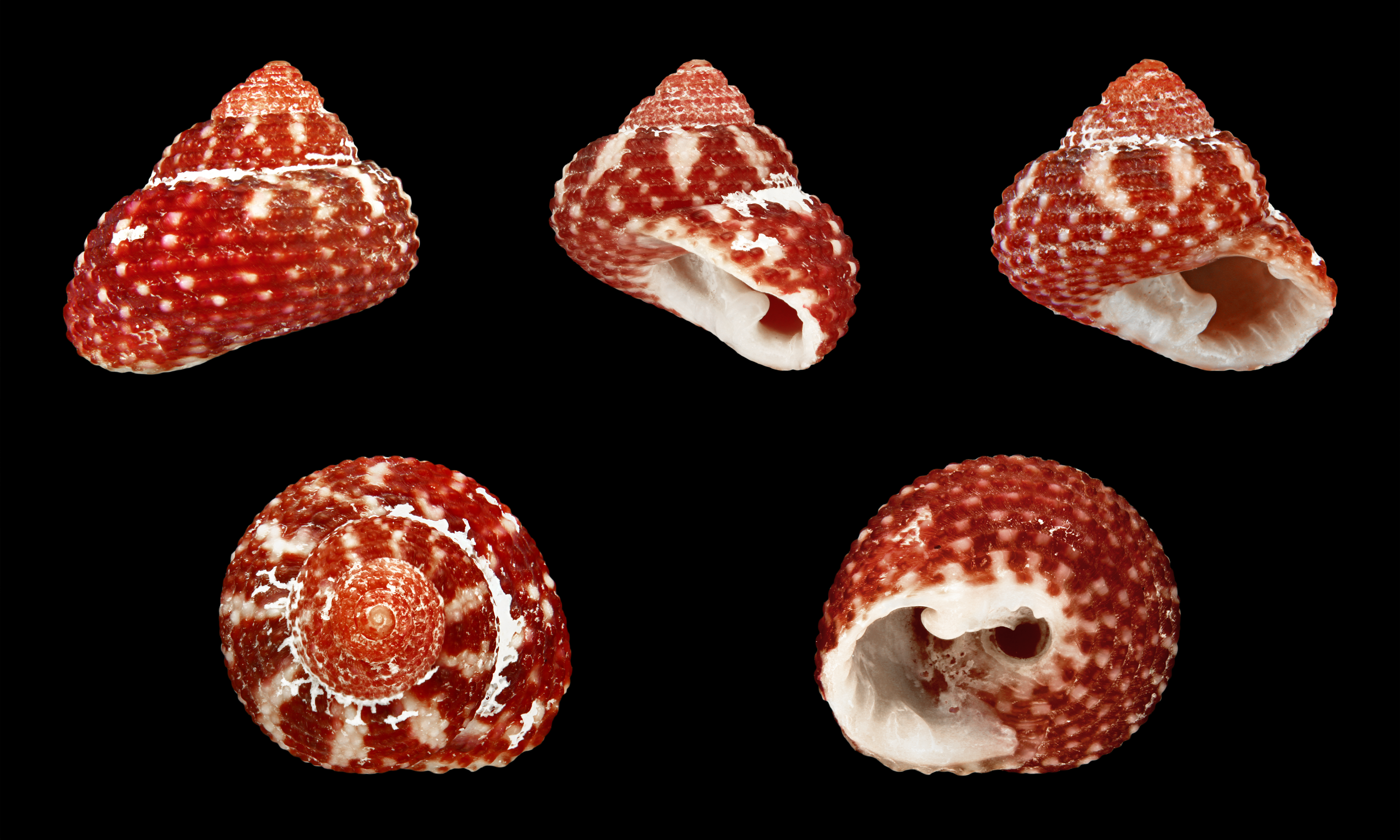
- Shell

Scientific classification
- Kingdom: Animalia
- Phylum: Mollusca
- Class: Gastropoda
- Subclass: Vetigastropoda
- Order: Trochida
- Superfamily: Trochoidea
- Family: Trochidae
- Genus: Clanculus
- Species: C. corallinus

Binomial name
- Clanculus corallinus (Gmelin, 1791)

Synonyms
- Clanculus corallinus var. brunnea Bucquoy, Dautzenberg & Dollfus, 1884; Clanculus couturii Payraudeau, 1826; Monodonta couturii Payraudeau, 1826; Otavia corallina Risso, A., 1826; Trochus corallinus Gmelin, 1791 (original description); Trochus multigranatus Philippi, 1848; Trochus pharaonius Costa, O.G., 1829; Trochus roseus Salis Marschlins, 1793

= Clanculus corallinus =

Species of gastropod

Clanculus corallinus is a species of sea snail, a marine gastropod mollusk in the family Trochidae, the top snails.

== Description ==
The size of the shell varies between 6 mm and 10 mm. The umbilicate shell has a globose-conic shape. It is coral-red or brown, marked beneath the sutures with narrow flames of white and maculations of brown, and on the base dotted with white. But the species exhibits a considerable variation in color. The conic spire is acute. The sutures are subcanaliculate. The five to six whorls are convex, spirally granose-lirate. The body whorl is rounded, encircled by 14 or 15 conspicuously granose equal ridges, the interstices finely obliquely striate, and with more or less obvious spiral striae. The oblique aperture is subquadrangular. The outer lip is plicate within, dentate above, the tooth usually bifid. The basal margin is curved and crenulate within. The columella is inserted deep in the rather narrow umbilicus, bearing a strong dentiform fold above and a large quadrangular biplicate tooth at the base. The parietal wall is wrinkled. The white umbilicus is smooth within and has a crenulate margin.

== Distribution ==
This species occurs in the Mediterranean Sea.
