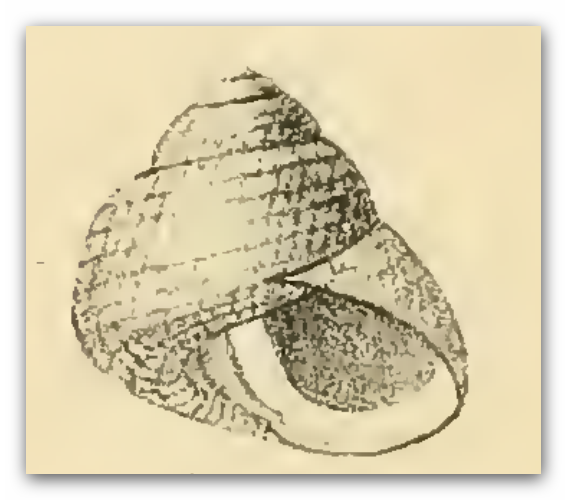
- Drawing with an apertural view of Chlorodiloma crinita

Scientific classification
- Kingdom: Animalia
- Phylum: Mollusca
- Class: Gastropoda
- Subclass: Vetigastropoda
- Order: Trochida
- Superfamily: Trochoidea
- Family: Trochidae
- Genus: Chlorodiloma
- Species: C. crinita

Binomial name
- Chlorodiloma crinita (Philippi, 1849)

Synonyms
- Diloma (Chlorodiloma) crinita (Philippi, 1849); Monodonta crinita (Philippi, 1849); Trochus crinita Philippi, 1849

= Chlorodiloma crinita =

Species of gastropod

Chlorodiloma crinita is a species of sea snail, a marine gastropod mollusk in the family Trochidae, the top snails.

== Description ==
The shell grows to a length of 15 mm. The globose-conic shell is narrowly perforate, solid, and light cinereous. It is longitudinally marked with numerous narrow regularly spaced olive lines. The first whorls are bright orange colored. The spire is conic and eroded. The sutures are linear and impressed. The five whorls are convex and spirally grooved. These grooves are shallow, about 5 on the penultimate whorl. The aperture is oblique. The lip is smooth and thickened within. The columella is not very thick. It is arcuate, white edged and obtusely dentate below. The umbilico-columellar area is bright green.

== Distribution ==
This marine species occurs off West Australia.
