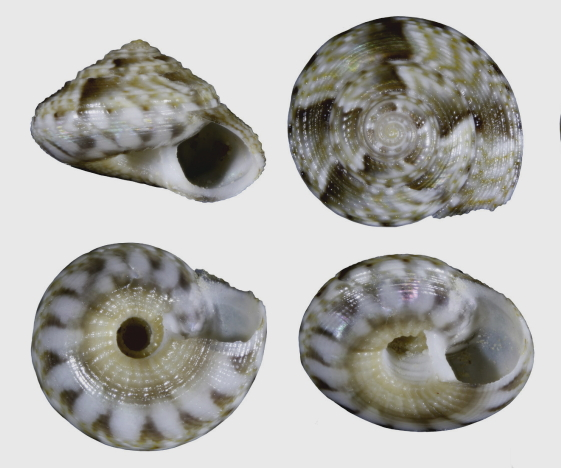
- Shell of Tylorhaphe alisae (holotype)

Scientific classification
- Kingdom: Animalia
- Phylum: Mollusca
- Class: Gastropoda
- Subclass: Vetigastropoda
- Order: Trochida
- Family: Trochidae
- Subfamily: Umboniinae
- Genus: Tylorhaphe
- Species: T. alisae

Binomial name
- Tylorhaphe alisae D. G. Herbert, 2024

Synonyms
- Ethminolia nektonica (non Okutani, 1961); Ethminolia impressa (non G. Nevill & H. Nevill, 1869)

= Tylorhaphe alisae =

Species of gastropod

Tylorhaphe alisae is a species of sea snail, a marine gastropod mollusk in the family Trochidae, the top snails.

== Description ==
The holotype is 2.9 mm high and 4.3 mm in diameter; the largest specimen attains a diameter of 5.0 mm.

(Original description) The shell is small (diameter up to 5.0 mm), trochiform and relatively solid, with a spire of moderate height (H/D 0.65–0.70). The teleoconch contains up to 4.5 whorls. The periphery is roundly angled and situated below mid‑whorl, with the suture lying at the level of the periphery. The base is somewhat flattened and bears a moderately wide umbilicus.

The first teleoconch whorl carries three indistinct, rounded spiral cords. The upper cord strengthens on the second whorl and becomes shoulder‑like; two further cords lie below, one at mid‑whorl and one at the abapical suture. During the third whorl, an additional beaded subsutural cord appears and the shoulder cord weakens. As growth continues, additional intermediary cords arise, but the subsutural, mid‑whorl, and peripheral cords remain somewhat stronger. The last adult whorl has six to eight secondary cords between the subsutural and mid‑whorl cords, with finer spiral threads in the intervals.

Axial sculpture is weak and consists only of low subsutural pleats on the mid‑spire whorls, which bead the subsutural cord; these pleats become more irregular and fade out with growth. Axial microscopic threads form a fine microsculpture throughout.

The base is sculptured with fine spiral cords that are broader and flatter in the middle of the base but strengthen around the umbilicus. Axial sculpture consists of collabral (parallel to the growth direction) growth lines that are sinuous below the periphery; some strengthen and become pleat‑like around the umbilicus.

The umbilicus is of moderate width, with an angled rim delineated by a strong cord that is beaded by radiating pleats. The sides of the umbilicus are steep and sometimes slightly overhung by the rim, and three to four low spiral cords occur within; a funicle is lacking.

The aperture is subquadrate, and the peristome is interrupted across the parietal region. The columella is stout and bears a low nodule at its base, overlying a notch at the junction of the columellar and basal lips. At full maturity the outer lip is slightly descendant and shows a shallow subperipheral concavity; the interior of the outer lip is smooth and somewhat thickened within.

The pattern of the colour consists of fine zigzag axial lines or flames in yellow and white, often accompanied by bold brown subsutural blotches. The beaded subsutural cord is distinctly pinkish in some specimens. The middle of the base shows a striking radiating pattern of alternating white and brown or pinkish trigonal marks. The peri‑umbilical region is straw‑yellow, and the interior of the umbilicus is whitish. The protoconch and apical whorls are translucent whitish to pale yellow or greyish, with the shoulder cord often dotted with opaque white spots; the early teleoconch whorls sometimes bear a dark peripheral band. The shell is moderately glossy throughout.

The protoconch is somewhat worn, but appears to be similar to that of Tylorhaphe luteopicta, with a diameter of about 200 µm. Operculum, radula, and external anatomy are unknown.

== Distribution ==
This marine species occurs off New Caledonia in deeper lagoon channels.
