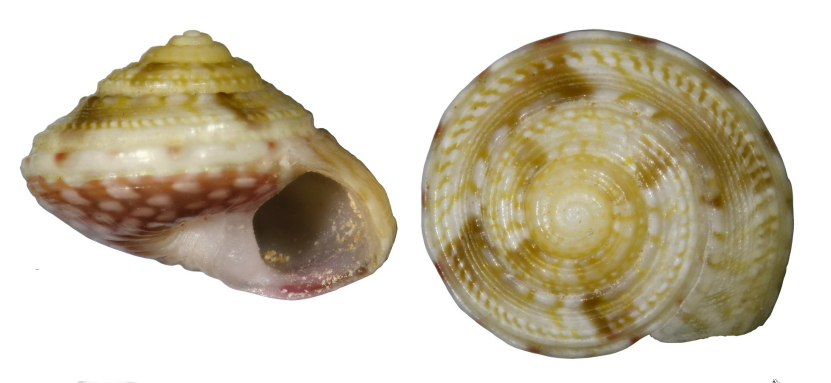
- Shell of Tylorhaphe fritillaria (holotype)
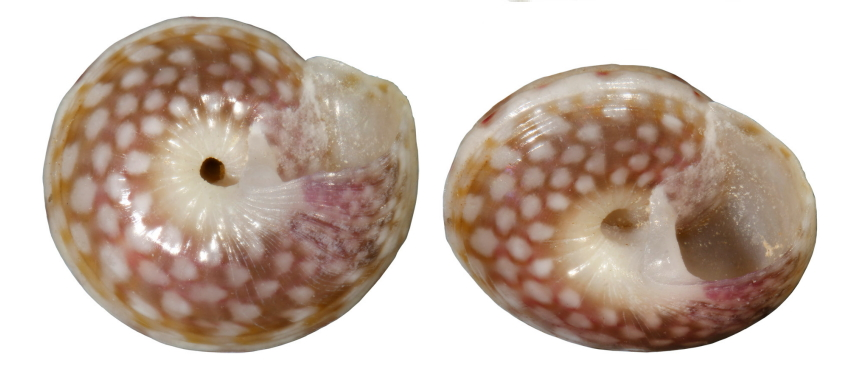
- Base of the shell of Tylorhaphe fritillaria (holotype)

Scientific classification
- Kingdom: Animalia
- Phylum: Mollusca
- Class: Gastropoda
- Subclass: Vetigastropoda
- Order: Trochida
- Family: Trochidae
- Subfamily: Umboniinae
- Genus: Tylorhaphe
- Species: T. fritillaria

Binomial name
- Tylorhaphe fritillaria D. G. Herbert, 2024

= Tylorhaphe fritillaria =

Species of gastropod

Tylorhaphe fritillaria is a species of sea snail, a marine gastropod mollusk in the family Trochidae, the top snails.

== Description ==
The holotype reaches a height of 2.5 mm and a diameter of 3.6 mm, while the largest specimen attains a diameter of 4.0 mm.

The shell is small, reaching a diameter of up to 4.0 mm. It is trochiform and relatively solid, with a spire of moderate height (H/D 0.65–0.75). The teleoconch contains up to 4.75 whorls. The periphery is roundly angled and situated close to mid‑whorl, with the suture lying at the same level. The base is relatively narrowly umbilicate.

The first teleoconch whorl bears four fine spiral lirae. During the second whorl, two stronger cords develop, one at the shoulder and another between this and the abapical suture. A third spiral cord appears below the adapical suture in the third whorl, strengthening and becoming beaded on subsequent whorls. The shoulder cord becomes progressively less distinct during the fourth whorl, while additional spiral lirae arise between the cords, especially between the subsutural cord and the vestige of the shoulder cord. On the body whorl, a peripheral cord emerges from the suture and marks the upper limit of the peripheral angulation. The whorl profile is distinctly concave between the peripheral and supraperipheral cords and flatter between the supraperipheral and subsutural cords.

Axial sculpture is weak, consisting only of indistinct growth lines, most conspicuous in the final quarter whorl, and a fine microsculpture of axial threads is present throughout.

The base carries three to four spiral cords below the periphery; its mid‑region is smoother, bearing only collabral growth lines that are sinuous below the periphery. In the peri‑umbilical region, strong pleats radiate from the umbilical rim but there is no spiral sculpture. The umbilicus is relatively narrow, with a thickened, roundly angled rim that is crenulated by the radiating pleats. The sides of the umbilicus are steep and greatly overhung by the rim, and low spiral cords occur within; a funicle is absent.

The aperture is subquadrate, and the peristome is interrupted across the parietal region. The columella is stout and shows a low bulge at its base, together with a shallow notch at the end of the thickened umbilical rim at the junction of the columellar and basal lips. In the material available the outer lip is not descendant and is shallowly indented below the periphery; its interior is smooth and somewhat thickened within.

The colour pattern is variable. The ground colour is typically whitish, mottled with spots, blotches, and lines in shades of brownish yellow to olive brown. A spiral band of narrow, alternately white and brownish‑yellow axial lines runs above the supraperipheral cord, and the peripheral cord bears small, widely spaced maroon‑red spots. The base has a maroon‑brown ground densely speckled with white blotches, while the umbilical rim and columella are whitish. Some specimens are more uniformly pale orange above the periphery, with pinkish subsutural, shoulder, and peripheral cords. In older, post‑mortem shells, the basal ground colour may turn rose‑pink.

The protoconch is somewhat worn, but it appears to be similar to that of Tylorhaphe luteopicta., with a diameter of approximately 195 µm.

The features of the operculum, radula and external anatomy remain unknown.

== Distribution ==
This marine species occurs off New Caledonia (Grande Terre and Loyalty Islands) in deeper lagoon channels.
