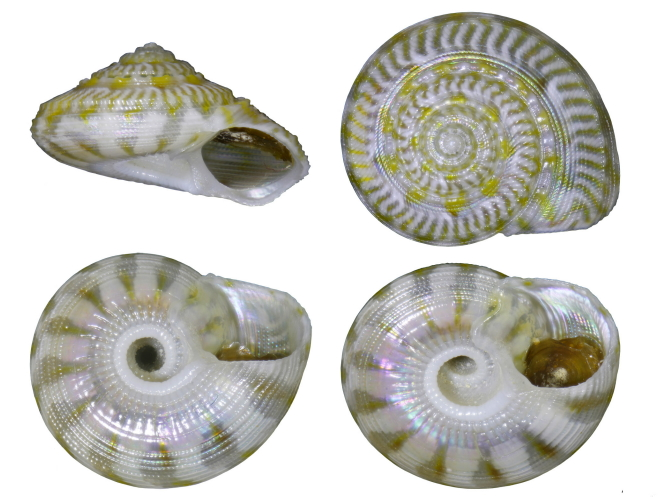
- Shell of Tylorhaphe wallacei (holotype)

Scientific classification
- Kingdom: Animalia
- Phylum: Mollusca
- Class: Gastropoda
- Subclass: Vetigastropoda
- Order: Trochida
- Family: Trochidae
- Subfamily: Umboniinae
- Genus: Tylorhaphe
- Species: T. wallacei

Binomial name
- Tylorhaphe wallacei D. G. Herbert, 2024

= Tylorhaphe wallacei =

Species of gastropod

Tylorhaphe wallacei is a species of sea snail, a marine gastropod mollusk in the family Trochidae, the top snails.

== Description ==
The holotype reaches a height of 3.8 mm and a diameter of 6.5 mm, while the largest specimen attains a diameter of 6.7 mm.

The small shell has a diameter of up to 6.7 mm, and is depressed‑trochiform in shape (H/D 0.57–0.60). The teleoconch comprises up to 5.0 whorls. The periphery is roundly angled and lies just below mid‑whorl, while the suture runs slightly above the periphery. The base is umbilicate and somewhat flattened.

The first teleoconch whorl is rounded and bears about three indistinct spiral cords. A shoulder develops and strengthens through the second and third whorls. Near the end of the third whorl, two strong cords arise, one subsutural and the other supraperipheral. The subsutural cord is at first beaded by prosocline subsutural pliculae, but this beading becomes progressively stronger as the shell grows, so that the body whorl shows strong nodules on the subsutural cord. The supraperipheral cord remains more finely beaded, with its beads aligned with the axial pliculae.

The interval between the subsutural and supraperipheral cords forms a broad, bevelled, almost flat slope. This slope is sculptured by finer secondary cords and additional intermediaries, initially few but becoming more numerous and more closely spaced with growth, reaching up to about ten cords on the body whorl. The bevelled slope carries distinct, close‑set, strongly prosocline pliculae, which become finer and even more closely spaced on the body whorl. The interaction of the spiral and axial elements produces a finely beaded reticulation. At the start of the body whorl there are about three peripheral spiral cords.

The base bears similar but finer spiral cords, all separated by pliculate intervals. The spiral sculpture is usually weaker in the mid‑region of the base (though not invariably), but it strengthens considerably towards the umbilicus, where two to four strong cords develop; the innermost of these is the largest and forms the umbilical rim. All peri‑umbilical cords are rendered nodular by strong axial pliculae that radiate from the umbilicus.

The umbilicus is relatively narrow, about 0.22 of the maximum shell diameter, and is steep‑sided and deep. Its walls retain traces of spiral and axial sculpture and are overhung by the cord that defines the umbilical rim. A funicle is absent.

The aperture is roundly quadrate, and the peristome is interrupted across the parietal region. The columellar pillar is thick, with a slight basal swelling and a micropustular surface. The parietal lip is thickened into a callus and extends outward as a rounded lobe above the insertion of the columella. The surface of this lobe is micro-shagreened and in the most mature individuals may bear indistinct in‑running ridges. The edge of the lobe is slightly thickened and drops in a step‑like fashion to the underside of the preceding whorl. The outer lip descends steeply immediately before its insertion; its interior is somewhat thickened and may show traces of in‑running ridges, but is otherwise smooth and nacreous, with the external sculpture visible by transparency. In mature specimens the outer lip has a shallow subperipheral concavity, and its thickening is also evident externally as a slight subterminal swelling.

The shell is glossy throughout. The colour pattern consists of bold, bright yellowish subsutural blotches, and the bevelled slope displays alternating yellowish and opaque white axial lines. Bolder blotches in similar colours occur at the periphery and extend onto the base in a radiating pattern. The peri‑umbilical region is white. The apical whorls are translucent whitish to pale yellowish‑grey, with the first whorl bearing a row of opaque white dots at the shoulder, and the apical bulb of the protoconch is opaque white. In some individuals the yellow colour may fade post mortem to a pale apricot‑brown.

The protoconch is as in Tylorhaphe luteopicta, but slightly larger, with a diameter of 220–230 µm.

The operculum is corneous and multispiral, with a peripheral fringe that is radially striate. The radial striations persist where the whorls overlap, and the surface bears a distinct spiral microsculpture.

The radula is very similar to that of Tylorhaphe luteopicta. The cusp of the transitional innermost marginal tooth is trigonal and carries three small, pointed denticles. The second marginal is clearly the largest tooth, and its cusp has a strong triangular central denticle that bears smaller lateral denticles at its base on both sides.

The external anatomy (from rehydrated specimens, in poor condition) shows a head with a distinct forehead between the cephalic tentacles. The snout is moderately long and cylindrical, and its distal third bears long, slender papillae. Cephalic lappets are not evident. The cephalic tentacles are long and slender, micropapillate, and the eyestalks are long, with conspicuously expanded tips that contain large black eyes. The left neck‑lobe is small and digitate, while the right neck‑lobe is rolled to form an exhalant siphon. Details of the epipodial structures are unclear. The foot appears broad, with lateral propodial lobes on each side, and tapers posteriorly. The head‑foot is translucent cream‑white, with opaque white pigmentation on the snout, eyestalks, right neck‑lobe, sides of the foot, and metapodium.

== Distribution ==
This marine species occurs in the Bismarck Sea.
