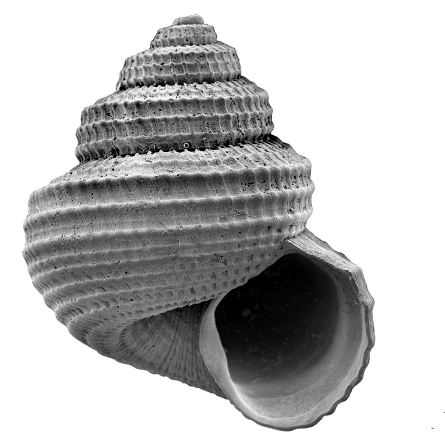
- shell of Vanitrochus tragema
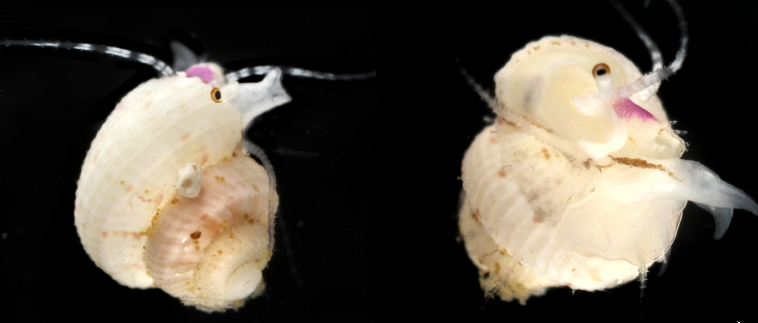
- living specimens

Scientific classification
- Kingdom: Animalia
- Phylum: Mollusca
- Class: Gastropoda
- Subclass: Vetigastropoda
- Order: Trochida
- Superfamily: Trochoidea
- Family: Trochidae
- Genus: Vanitrochus
- Species: V. tragema

Binomial name
- Vanitrochus tragema (Melvill & Standen, 1896)

Synonyms
- Monilea tragema (Melvill & Standen, 1896) superseded combination; Solariella (Conotrochus) tragema Melvill & Standen, 1896; Solariella tragema Melvill & Standen, 1896 (original combination)

= Vanitrochus tragema =

Species of gastropod

Vanitrochus tragema is a species of sea snail, a marine gastropod mollusk in the family Trochidae, the top snails.

== Description ==
The size of the shell varies between 1.8 mm and 4 mm.

(Original description) This is a small conical chalky-white shell, colourless excepting for scattered transverse pink flames round the upper parts of the lower whorls just below the sutures. The shell is profoundly but narrowly umbilicate. The shell contains six whorls six, two being in the protoconch, slantingly angled in a gradate manner. The surface is closely acutely ribbed, the transverse decussations somewhat noticeable in the interstices, and these in some specimens give a crenulate appearance to the ribs themselves. The base is spirally costulate, as are the upper whorls. The aperture is round. The outer lip is simple.

(A more recent description) The shell closely resembles that of Vanitrochus semiustus and is of similar size, reaching a height of up to 3.0 mm. It differs, however, in having distinctly shouldered whorls, with the spiral cord that delineates the shoulder noticeably stronger than the other cords. The axial sculpture on the apical whorls is also stronger, producing coarser beading on the spiral cords.

The colouration is highly variable, and the pattern is rarely as dark as in V. semiustus. Shells are commonly whitish, with blotches on the shoulder in shades of brown, olive‑green, or pinkish‑red, accompanied by smaller spots at the periphery. The base typically bears a broad, mottled subperipheral band from which rays radiate inward toward, but do not enter, the umbilicus. Occasional specimens are uniformly whitish, whereas others show flecks of pigment on the spiral cords or are almost bicoloured. The interior is nacreous, but less distinctly so than in V. semiustus.

The protoconch is typical for the subfamily Umboniinae and measures 160–170 µm in diameter. An apical beak is present and confluent with the terminal lip. The apical bulb is sculptured with an irregular network of threads, which is almost hexagonal in places, while the remainder carries distinct subspiral threads. The terminal lip is weakly convex.

The operculum is corneous and multispiral, but the outer whorls are relatively broad and possess a long growing margin. The peripheral fringe is broad and exhibits well‑developed radial striation, and the surface shows distinct spiral microsculpture.

The radula has the formula ∞+(1)+5+1+5+(1)+∞ and comprises 20–25 transverse rows of teeth. The teeth of the central field are reduced. The rachidian base‑plate is rounded, with an indistinct vestige of the shaft at the centre of its anterior edge. The base‑plates of the lateral teeth are thin and extensively overlapping, with the outer edge rounded and raised anteriorly, leading into a narrow shaft vestige. The first marginal tooth is transitional, lacking both shaft and cusp; its base‑plate is arched and has a longitudinal medial hollow that accommodates the shaft of its outer neighbour. The subsequent inner marginal teeth are well developed, with a narrow shaft and a strongly recurved cusp. Each cusp is deeply divided into usually five lanceolate denticles, of which the middle one is largest. The cusps of more external marginal teeth become progressively smaller, with more slender and more numerous denticles, and the outermost marginals bear finely pectinate margins.

== Distribution ==
This marine species occurs off the Loyalty Islands, Tuvalu, and Australia (Queensland).
