= Tylorhaphe nektonica =

Scientific classification
- Kingdom: Animalia
- Phylum: Mollusca
- Class: Gastropoda
- Subclass: Vetigastropoda
- Order: Trochida
- Family: Trochidae
- Subfamily: Umboniinae
- Genus: Tylorhaphe
- Species: T. nektonica

Binomial name
- Tylorhaphe nektonica (Okutani, 1961)

Synonyms
- Ethminolia nektonica (Okutani, 1961) superseded combination; Solariella (Spectamen) nektonica Okutani, 1961; Solariella (Spectamen) nektonica tajimensis Okutani & Sakurai, 1968; Solariella nektonica Okutani, 1961; Solariella nektonica tajimensis Okutani & Sakurai, 1968

Species of gastropod

Tylorhaphe nektonica is a species of sea snail, a marine gastropod mollusk in the family Trochidae, the top snails.

== Description ==
The size of the shell varies between 3 mm and 5.5 mm.

== Distribution ==
This marine species occurs off the Philippines.
