= Conotalopia sematensis =

Scientific classification
- Kingdom: Animalia
- Phylum: Mollusca
- Class: Gastropoda
- Subclass: Vetigastropoda
- Order: Trochida
- Family: Trochidae
- Subfamily: Umboniinae
- Genus: Conotalopia
- Species: C. sematensis

Binomial name
- Conotalopia sematensis (Oyama, 1942)

Synonyms
- Lirularia (Conotalopia) sematensis (Oyama, 1942); Minolia (Conotalopia) sematensis Oyama, 1942 (original combination); Saleriella philippensis Watson, sensu Yokoyama, 1943

Species of gastropod

Conotalopia sematensis is a very small species of sea snail, a marine gastropod mollusk or micromollusk in the family Trochidae, the top snails.

== Description ==
The size of the shell varies between 3 mm and 5 mm.

== Distribution ==
This marine species occurs off Japan.
