= Conotalopia hilarula =

Scientific classification
- Kingdom: Animalia
- Phylum: Mollusca
- Class: Gastropoda
- Subclass: Vetigastropoda
- Order: Trochida
- Family: Trochidae
- Subfamily: Umboniinae
- Genus: Conotalopia
- Species: C. hilarula

Binomial name
- Conotalopia hilarula (Yokoyama, 1926)

Synonyms
- Minolia hilarula Yokoyama, 1926

Species of gastropod

Conotalopia hilarula is a species of sea snail, a marine gastropod mollusk in the family Trochidae, the top snails.

== Distribution ==
This marine species occurs in the Sea of Japan.
