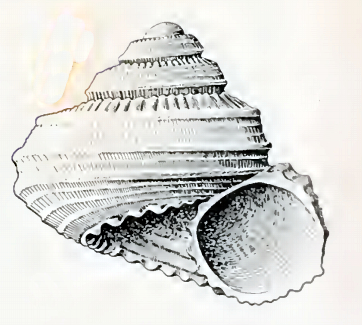
- Original drawing with an apertural view of a shell of Conotalopia tropicalis

Scientific classification
- Kingdom: Animalia
- Phylum: Mollusca
- Class: Gastropoda
- Subclass: Vetigastropoda
- Order: Trochida
- Family: Trochidae
- Subfamily: Umboniinae
- Genus: Conotalopia
- Species: C. tropicalis

Binomial name
- Conotalopia tropicalis (Hedley, 1907)

Synonyms(Hedley, 1907)
- Monilea tropicalis Hedley, 1907

= Conotalopia tropicalis =

Species of gastropod

Conotalopia tropicalis is a species of sea snail, a marine gastropod mollusk in the family Trochidae, the top snails.

== Description ==
The height of the shell attains 3.15 mm, its diameter 3.75 mm. The small, rather thin shell has a depressedly conical shape and is widely umbilicate. Its colour is grey, turning to pink on the body whorl, a few scattered crimson dots on the larger ribs. The shell contains 4½ whorls. The spire is biangulate. The body whorl is angled at the shoulder, periphery and base. The sculpture consists of a well-developed spiral rib that girdles the periphery. Parted from this by broad interspaces runs a similar one above and another below. On the base are four smaller spirals followed by a larger granulate rib which borders the umbilicus. Within the broad and deep umbilicus continues a succession of granulose spirals. The flat subsutural shell is traversed by radial plications and the whole shell is overrun by dense, fine, radial threads. The simple aperture is subcircular.

== Distribution ==
This marine species is endemic to Australia and occurs on the continental shelf off Queensland.
