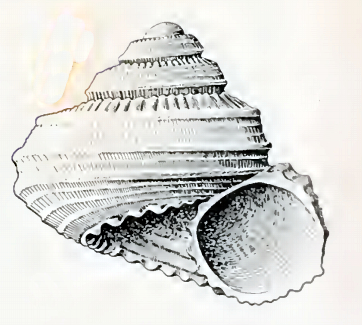
- Drawing of a shell of Conotalopia tropicalis

Scientific classification
- Kingdom: Animalia
- Phylum: Mollusca
- Class: Gastropoda
- Subclass: Vetigastropoda
- Order: Trochida
- Family: Trochidae
- Subfamily: Umboniinae
- Genus: Conotalopia; Iredale, 1929

Type species
- Minolia henniana Melvill, 1891

= Conotalopia =

Genus of gastropods

Conotalopia is a genus of sea snails, marine gastropod molluscs in the family Trochidae, the top shells.

== Species ==
Species within the genus Conotalopia include:

- Conotalopia henniana (Melvill, 1891)
- Conotalopia hilarula (Yokoyama, 1926)
- Conotalopia minima (Golikov, 1967)
- Conotalopia musiva (Gould, 1861)
- Conotalopia mustelina (Gould, 1861)
- Conotalopia ornata (G. B. Sowerby III, 1903)
- Conotalopia sematensis (Oyama, 1942)
- Conotalopia singaporensis (Pilsbry, 1889)
- Conotalopia tropicalis (Hedley, 1907)

Species brought into synonymy

- Conotalopia glaphyrella (Melvill, J.C. & R. Standen, 1895): synonym of Ethminolia glaphyrella (Melvill & Standen, 1895)
- Conotalopia marmorata (Pease, 1861): synonym of Calliotrochus marmoreus (Pease, 1861)
