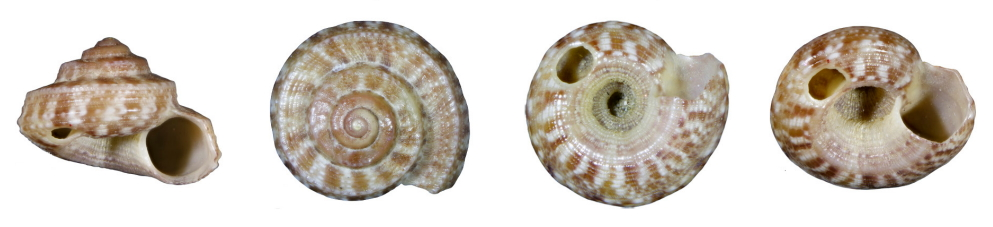
- shell of Conotalopia henniana

Scientific classification
- Kingdom: Animalia
- Phylum: Mollusca
- Class: Gastropoda
- Subclass: Vetigastropoda
- Order: Trochida
- Family: Trochidae
- Subfamily: Umboniinae
- Genus: Conotalopia
- Species: C. henniana

Binomial name
- Conotalopia henniana (Golikov, 1967)

Synonyms
- Minolia henniana Melvill, 1891

= Conotalopia henniana =

Species of gastropod

Conotalopia henniana is a species of very small sea snail, a marine gastropod mollusk in the family Trochidae, the top snails.

== Description ==
The height of the shell attains 3.25 mm, its diameter 4.5 mm. The red-brown shell has a depressed-conical shape and is profoundly umbilicated. The five whorls show a microscopic sculpture of fine radial threads that overrun the spirals and are more apparent on the base. In colour it is variable, the figured example has walnut-brown radial flames on a grey ground, in others the flames are brick red and in some the flames break up into small chequers.

== Distribution ==
This marine species is endemic to Australia and occurs on sandy beaches off Queensland.
