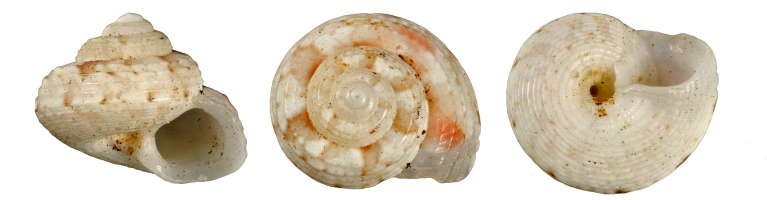
- Shell of Parminolia agapeta (syntype)

Scientific classification
- Kingdom: Animalia
- Phylum: Mollusca
- Class: Gastropoda
- Subclass: Vetigastropoda
- Order: Trochida
- Superfamily: Trochoidea
- Family: Trochidae
- Genus: Parminolia
- Species: P. agapeta

Binomial name
- Parminolia agapeta (Melvill & Standen, 1896)

Synonyms
- Minolia agapeta Melvill & Standen, 1896 superseded combination

= Parminolia agapeta =

Species of gastropod

Parminolia agapeta is a species of sea snail, a marine gastropod mollusk in the family Trochidae, the top snails.

== Description ==
(Original description in Latin) A very small shell, expanded‑conical and whitish. It is relatively solid and consists of five turreted whorls that are angular just below the sutures. The entire surface is distinctly and sharply sculptured with spiral lirae, while the intervals between them are very finely striated in the longitudinal (axial) direction. The body whorl is likewise angular at the periphery. Around the sutural angle the shell is marked with scarlet flames, and along the peripheral keel there is a row of scarlet dots; smaller spots of the same colour are scattered here and there, giving a subtle ornamentation.

The umbilicus is deep but narrow, and the basal surface is spirally lirate in the same manner as the upper surface. The aperture is round, and the peristome is rather thick, slightly reflected, and almost continuous. The interior of the aperture is tinged with scarlet.

(More recent description) The shell is relatively small and stout, with an adult diameter of 4–5 mm, and has a trochiform spire with an indented suture. The whorls are weakly shouldered and only weakly angled at the periphery. The base is rounded and carries a relatively narrow umbilicus. The sculpture consists of spiral cords, usually four to five on the penultimate whorl, accompanied by finer spiral lirae on the shoulder and a further cord at the level of the abapical suture. The shoulder cord and the cord immediately below it are usually stronger and distinctly undulant, reminiscent of piped icing on a cake; the peripheral cord is likewise often undulant. The intervals between the cords are filled with close‑set microscopic axial pliculae. Basal cords are finer, more evenly sized, and evenly spaced. The peri‑umbilical region sometimes shows weak axial pliculae, which become more distinct in strongly sculptured specimens. Within the umbilicus there is a thickened cord just inside the rim, set off from the rest of the base by a distinct furrow, and a further low, broad funicle (sometimes indistinct) lies deeper within. The aperture is roundly quadrate, and the outer lip is thick and internally smooth.

The colour pattern is variable, but the ground colour is commonly whitish, mottled with shades of greenish‑brown or pinkish‑red, often arranged as subsutural blotches or flames and smaller peripheral spots. The base usually has fewer markings and only rarely shows irregular axial flames. Occasional specimens display a pale pink wash above and below the periphery. The apex is normally whitish, although the apical bulb of the protoconch is very occasionally dark.

The protoconch is typical for the subfamily Umboniinae, with a diameter of about 170 µm. An apical beak is present and confluent with the terminal lip. The surface is sculptured with subspiral threads toward the periphery and near the apical beak, crossed by transverse threads in the region of the apical bulb. The terminal lip is weakly convex.

The operculum is corneous, with relatively wide whorls and a moderately long growing edge. The peripheral fringe is narrow and does not remain evident on the early whorls. The surface lacks spiral microsculpture.

The radula has the formula ∞+(1)+5+1+5+(1)+∞ and comprises about 35 transverse rows of teeth. The teeth of the central field are reduced, although their base‑plates remain distinct. The rachidian base‑plate is subquadrate, with rounded anterior shoulders and a small rounded vestige of a shaft. The base‑plates of the inner lateral teeth are trigonal, pinched anteriorly toward the cusp vestige, with the outer margin rounded and expanded so that they overlap the next outer tooth; the outer laterals are more quadrate and elongate. The innermost marginal tooth is transitional, with a trigonal base‑plate and reduced shaft and cusp. The remaining marginal teeth are well developed, with a narrow shaft and a strongly recurved cusp. The cusps of the inner series bear an acuminate central denticle that carries one to two long, slender basal denticles on each side. Marginals 3–10 have the largest cusps, which become progressively smaller farther out.

External anatomy (from rehydrated specimens): Only limited detail is evident. The inter‑tentacular region (forehead) is of moderate width and appears to carry a thin transverse fold of white‑pigmented tissue extending between the tentacles. The snout is prominent and bears papillae subterminally. The eyestalks are well developed, with expanded tips that contain large black eyes. The left neck‑lobe is a rounded flap with a digitate margin, whereas the right neck‑lobe is extensive, its margin entire and rolled to form a long exhalant siphon. There are four micropapillate epipodial tentacles on each side. The sides of the foot, particularly the metapodium, show some whitish pigmentation. The structure of the ctenidium is unclear, but its tip appears unattached.

== Distribution ==
This marine species occurs off the Loyalty Islands, Kiribati and the Marshall Islands.
