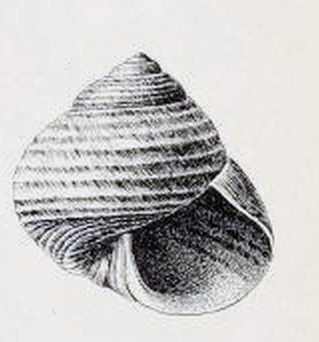
- Drawing of a shell of Lirularia succincta

Scientific classification
- Kingdom: Animalia
- Phylum: Mollusca
- Class: Gastropoda
- Subclass: Vetigastropoda
- Order: Trochida
- Superfamily: Trochoidea
- Family: Trochidae
- Genus: Lirularia
- Species: L. succincta

Binomial name
- Lirularia succincta (Carpenter, 1864)

Synonyms
- Gibbula succincta Carpenter, 1864

= Lirularia succincta =

Species of gastropod

Lirularia succincta, common name the tucked lirularia, is a species of sea snail, a marine gastropod mollusk in the family Trochidae, the top snails.

This species was originally described by Carpenter as Lirularia parcipicta.

== Description ==
The height of the shell varies between 3 mm and 7 mm. This small, but medium-sized for genus, species is somewhat less high than wide. The shell can take different colors, from brown to dark gray, often interrupted by white or dark spots. The convex whorls shows numerous, low, flattened, spiral cords. The sutures are slightly impressed. There is a broad channel on the base of the shell. The subquadrate aperture is somewhat oblique with its outer lip somewhat expanded and marked with darker spots. The columella is slightly arcuated. The broad umbilicus is deep and funnel-shaped.

== Distribution ==
This species occurs in the Pacific Ocean on rocks abundantly in the intertidal zone from the Gulf of Alaska to northern Baja California, Mexico
