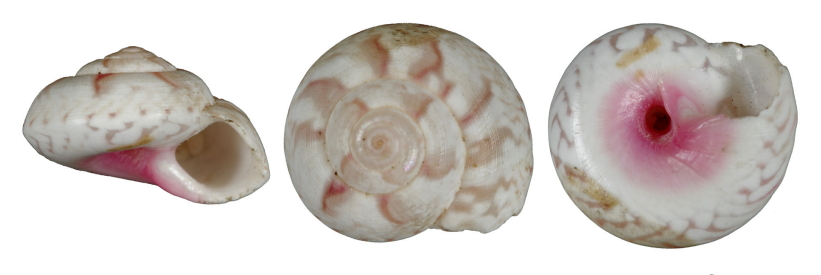
- Shell of Ethaliella rhodomphala (lectotype)

Scientific classification
- Kingdom: Animalia
- Phylum: Mollusca
- Class: Gastropoda
- Subclass: Vetigastropoda
- Order: Trochida
- Superfamily: Trochoidea
- Family: Trochidae
- Genus: Ethaliella
- Species: E. rhodomphala

Binomial name
- Ethaliella rhodomphala (Souverbie, 1875)

Synonyms
- Minolia rhodomphala (Souverbie, 1875); Monilea (Minolia) rhodomphala (Souverbie, 1875); Monilea rhodomphala (Souverbie, 1875); Trochus (Monilea) rhodomphalus Souverbie, 1875 (basionym); Trochus rhodomphalus Souverbie, 1875 (original combination)

= Ethaliella rhodomphala =

Species of gastropod

Ethaliella rhodomphala is a species of sea snail, a marine gastropod mollusk in the family Trochidae, the top snails.

== Description ==
The shell is of small to moderate size, with a maximum diameter of 7.6 mm but most specimens measure less than 6.0 mm. It is low turbiniform to trochoid‑turbiniform, with the periphery rounded or only weakly angled and situated at or below mid‑whorl; the whorls are occasionally weakly shouldered. The early whorls bear three to four distinct spiral cords, which become more numerous and more closely spaced on subsequent whorls through intercalation of intermediate cords.

The sculpture on the last two whorls is distinctive and consists of numerous fine, close‑set spiral cords that are rendered somewhat wavy by indistinct growth lines. On the middle spire whorls, the subsutural cord is often slightly stronger and is made undulant or even weakly beaded by low subsutural pliculae; this feature fades out on the last adult whorl. Axial sculpture otherwise comprises only the growth lines and microscopic axial threads. The base is glossier, with weaker spiral sculpture and is almost smooth in some specimens. The umbilicus is of moderate width and steep‑sided, its margin thickened and radially plicate; the interior of the umbilicus lacks a distinct funicle, although the columellar lip is substantially thickened.

The colour pattern is variable. The ground colour is pale and variously mottled with shades of yellowish to greyish brown, often with darker blotches below the suture and at the periphery, and occasionally it is more uniformly pale pink. The base is often more boldly patterned, with irregular radiating and anastomosing brown markings that separate opaque white blotches. The umbilicus and its rim are pale to deep pink, although the extent of this coloration is variable and it is often absent in immature specimens. The protoconch and apical whorls are usually whitish, but may occasionally be yellowish, pink, brown, or almost black.

The protoconch is typical for the subfamily Umboniinae and has a diameter of 170–180 µm. An apical beak is present and confluent with the terminal lip. The apical bulb is sculptured with an irregular, open network of threads, almost hexagonal in places, and the remainder bears fine subspiral threads. The terminal lip is weakly convex.

The operculum is corneous and multispiral, with the outer whorls relatively broad and having a long growing margin. The peripheral fringe is relatively narrow and radially striate, and spiral microsculpture is present but indistinct.

The radula has the formula ∞+(1)+5+1+5+(1)+∞ and comprises 35–40 transverse rows of teeth. The teeth of the central field are reduced and have thin base‑plates; the rachidian base‑plate is ovate. The base‑plates of the lateral teeth are more trigonal, broadly expanded laterally and extensively overlapping, with the anterior edge slightly raised and bearing a small, pointed vestige of a shaft.

The innermost marginal tooth is transitional, with a truncate remnant of a shaft. The remaining inner marginal teeth have well‑developed shafts and recurved cusps. The cusps of marginal teeth 3–8 are the largest and somewhat palmate: the central denticle is rounded and not markedly larger than the others, and three or more long, pointed denticles are present on the outer margin, with additional shorter, pointed denticles on the inner margin. Marginal cusps become progressively smaller and more finely denticulate toward the radula margin.

External anatomy (from photographs and rehydrated specimens): The head bears a distinct forehead between the cephalic tentacles. The snout is cylindrical and carries a cluster of subterminal papillae on each side. Cephalic lappets are not evident. The cephalic tentacles are slender, with the right tentacle perhaps slightly longer. The eyestalks are well developed and very long, with internal blotches of white pigment and a large black eye at each tip.

The left neck‑lobe is small and consists of only about four slender digits behind the eyestalk, whereas the right neck‑lobe is rolled to form a well‑developed exhalant siphon. There are four epipodial tentacles posterior to the neck‑lobes on each side, each apparently bearing a basal epipodial sense organ. The anterior part of the foot is indented along the midline, laterally expanded, and pinched in just behind this, and the foot then tapers posteriorly. The head–foot is translucent white with frequent blotches of opaque white pigment, and the sides of the snout and foot also have black blotches. The tip of the ctenidium is free.

== Distribution ==
This marine species occurs off the Loyalty Islands.
