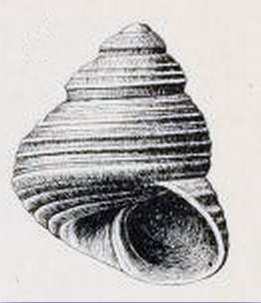
- Drawing of a shell of Lirularia parcipicta

Scientific classification
- Kingdom: Animalia
- Phylum: Mollusca
- Class: Gastropoda
- Subclass: Vetigastropoda
- Order: Trochida
- Family: Trochidae
- Genus: Lirularia; Dall, 1909

Type species
- Lirularia lirulata Carpenter, P.P., 1864

= Lirularia =

Genus of gastropods

Lirularia is a genus of small sea snails, marine gastropod mollusks in the subfamily Umboniinae of the family Trochidae, the top snails.

== Species ==
Species within the genus Lirularia include:

- Lirularia acuticostata (Carpenter, 1864)
- Lirularia antoniae Rubio & Rolán, 1997
- † Lirularia aresta (Berry, 1941)
- Lirularia bicostata (J. H. McLean, 1964)
- Lirularia canaliculata (E.A. Smith, 1871)
- Lirularia dereimsi (Dollfus, 1911)
- Lirularia discors J. H. McLean, 1984
- Lirularia iridescens (Schrenck, 1863)
- Lirularia lirulata (Carpenter, 1864)
- Lirularia monodi (Fischer-Piette & Nicklès, 1946)
- Lirularia optabilis (Carpenter, 1864)
- Lirularia parcipicta (Carpenter, 1864)
- Lirularia pygmaea (Yokoyama, 1922)
- Lirularia redimita (Gould, 1861)
- Lirularia succincta (Carpenter, 1864)
- Lirularia yamadana (E. A. Smith, 1875)

Species brought into synonymy

- Lirularia minima (Golikov, in Golikov & Scarlato, 1967): synonym of Conotalopia minima (Golikov, 1967)
