= Conotalopia mustelina =

Scientific classification
- Kingdom: Animalia
- Phylum: Mollusca
- Class: Gastropoda
- Subclass: Vetigastropoda
- Order: Trochida
- Family: Trochidae
- Subfamily: Umboniinae
- Genus: Conotalopia
- Species: C. mustelina

Binomial name
- Conotalopia mustelina (Gould, 1861)

Synonyms
- Gibbula awajiensis G. B. Sowerby III, 1914; Margarita mustelina Gould, 1861 (original combination)

Species of gastropod

Conotalopia mustelina is a species of sea snail, a marine gastropod mollusk in the family Trochidae, the top snails.

== Description ==
The height of the shell attains 3 mm, its diameter 4 mm. The thin, small shell has a globose-conical shape. It is concentrically striated. Its ground color is white, covered with brown checkered spirals. The four whorls are ventricose with a bluntly angular periphery. The base of the shell is rounded and widely perforated. The aperture is ovate. The thin columella is arcuated.

== Distribution ==
This marine species occurs off the Philippines and off Japan.
