= Conotalopia ornata =

Scientific classification
- Kingdom: Animalia
- Phylum: Mollusca
- Class: Gastropoda
- Subclass: Vetigastropoda
- Order: Trochida
- Family: Trochidae
- Subfamily: Umboniinae
- Genus: Conotalopia
- Species: C. ornata

Binomial name
- Conotalopia ornata (Sowerby III, 1903)

Synonyms
- Minolia ornata G. B. Sowerby III, 1903 (original combination); Solariella angulata Tokunaga, 1906; Trochus angulatus Tokunaga, 1906

Species of gastropod

Conotalopia ornata is a species of very small sea snail, a marine gastropod mollusk or micromollusk in the family Trochidae, the top snails.

== Description ==
The size of the adult shell varies between 3 mm and 5 mm.

== Distribution ==
This marine species on sandy bottoms occurs off Japan.
