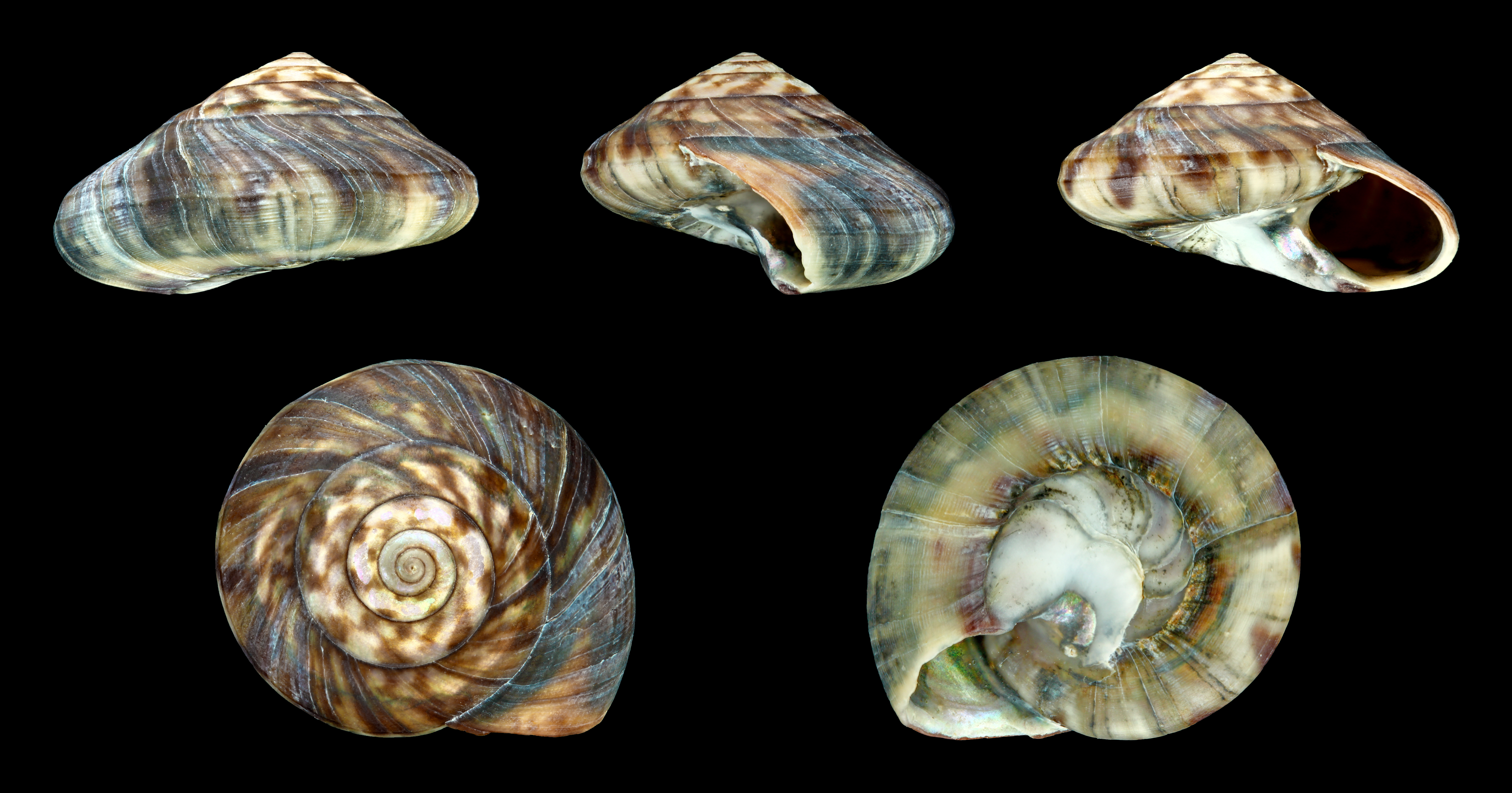
- A shell of Zethalia zelandica

Scientific classification
- Kingdom: Animalia
- Phylum: Mollusca
- Class: Gastropoda
- Subclass: Vetigastropoda
- Order: Trochida
- Family: Trochidae
- Subfamily: Umboniinae
- Genus: Zethalia
- Species: Z. zelandica

Binomial name
- Zethalia zelandica (Hombron & Jacquinot, 1855)

Synonyms
- Ethalia zelandica Hombron & Jacquinot, 1855; Globulus anguliferus Philippi, 1853 ?; Rotella neozelanica Hutton, 1884; Rotella zelandica Hombron & Jacquinot, 1855 (original combination); Umbonium chalconutum A. Adams, 1853; Umbonium zelandica (Hombron & Jacquinot, 1855); Umbonium zelandicum A. Adams, 1853

= Zethalia zelandica =

Species of gastropod

Zethalia zelandica, common name the wheel shell, is a species of sea snail, a marine gastropod mollusk, in the family Trochidae, the top snails.

Originally four names were proposed for this shell and published at about the same time—in 1854. George Washington Tryon stated that he had no means of knowing which has priority, but was inclined to prefer Hombron's to Adams', as it was accompanied by good figures. The title page of Philippi's monograph is 1853, but the actual date of issue is very uncertain.

== Description ==
The length of the shell varies between 15 mm and 22 mm. The solid shell is depressed and imperforate. The colour is yellowish or pinkish, radiately streaked with chestnut brown or red above, the base with a reddish or purple zone around the central callus, the outer part white, more or less striped radiately. The shining surface is smooth. The base of the shell shows under a lens very fine, close, regular spiral striae. Well-preserved specimens show red and emerald-green reflections through the thin layer overlying the nacre, like fiery opals.

The low spire has a conoidal shape. The sutures are linear and not impressed. The body whorl is concave above. The compressed periphery is encircled by two rather obscure carinae. The base of the shell is slightly convex, with a narrow spiral groove bounding a central area which is covered by a thin, radiately rugose, purple and white callus. The aperture is rounded quadrate, nacreous and iridescent within. The columella is short, very thick and heavy. Its edge is pearly, inserted in a pad of white callus on the body and over the axis.

The radiating stripes, compressed body whorl, and biangular periphery easily distinguished this shell.

Unlike other trochids this is primarily a filter feeder, secreting a chain of mucus on which particles are trapped and hauling it in periodically to ingest. It lives buried in the sand on exposed ocean beaches, sometimes washed up in large numbers after storms.

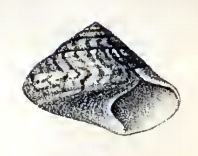
Drawing with an apertural view of the shell

== Distribution ==
This marine species is endemic to New Zealand and the Chatham Islands, being most common on the east coast of Northland.
