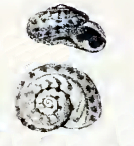
- Drawing with two views of a shell of Camitia rotellina

Scientific classification
- Kingdom: Animalia
- Phylum: Mollusca
- Class: Gastropoda
- Subclass: Vetigastropoda
- Order: Trochida
- Superfamily: Trochoidea
- Family: Trochidae
- Genus: Camitia
- Species: C. rotellina

Binomial name
- Camitia rotellina (Gould, 1849)

Synonyms
- Trochus rotellina Gould, 1849 (original combination); Trochus (Monodonta) rotellinus Gould, 1860

= Camitia rotellina =

Species of gastropod

Camitia rotellina, common name the wheel top shell, is a species of sea snail, a marine gastropod mollusk in the family Trochidae, the top snails.

== Description ==
The length of the shell varies between 10 mm and 20 mm. The discoidal, depressed, smooth, shining shell is covered-perforate. The six whorls, are, under a lens, very minutely, obliquely striate. The earliest whorls are whitish, spirally obsoletely sulcate, the remainder are pale flesh-colored, ornamented with a subsutural linear zone and oblique brown spots. The body whorl is dilated, obtuse in the middle, spirally trilineate (one line above, two at periphery), somewhat convex beneath, with two zones of brown spots. The aperture is transverse, and scarcely sulcate within. The columella is nearly horizontal, twisted above, truncate beneath. The columellar callus forms a coating to the extremely oblique umbilicus.

== Distribution ==
This marine species occurs off Taiwan, off the Ryukyu Islands, in the East China Sea and off the Philippines.
