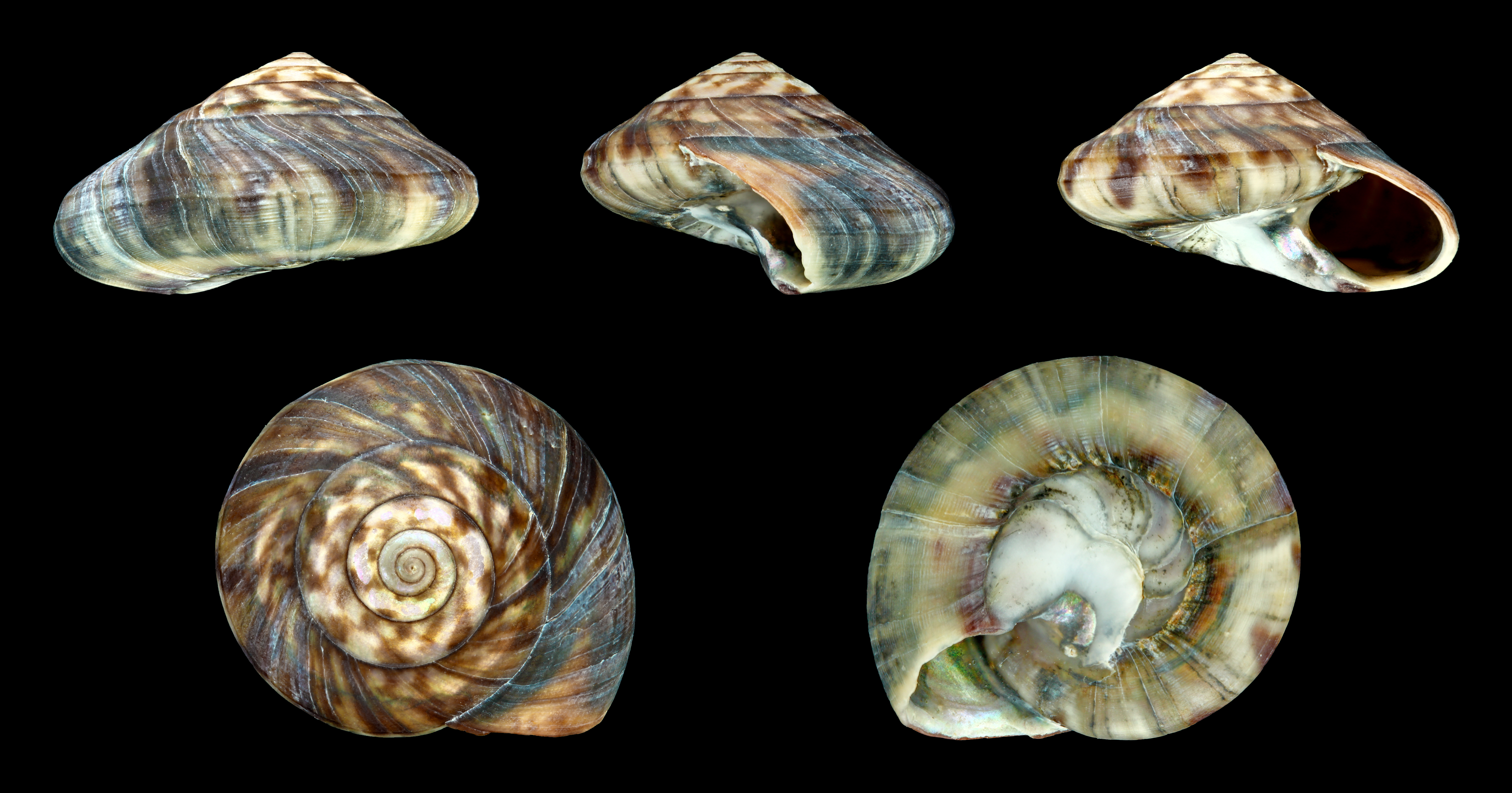
- Zethalia zelandica

Scientific classification
- Kingdom: Animalia
- Phylum: Mollusca
- Class: Gastropoda
- Subclass: Vetigastropoda
- Order: Trochida
- Family: Trochidae
- Subfamily: Umboniinae
- Genus: Zethalia; Finlay, 1926

Type species
- Zethalia zelandica J.B. Hombron. & C.H. Jacquinot, 1855

Synonyms
- Ethaliopsis Cossmann, 1918 (invalid, preoccupied by Ethaliopsis Schepmann, 1908)

= Zethalia =

Genus of gastropods

Zethalia is a genus of sea snails in the subfamily Umboniinae of the family Trochidae, the top snails, first formally named in 1918.

== Species ==
The genus contains one extant (still living) species and two extinct species:

- †Zethalia coronata Marwick, 1948
- †Zethalia russelli Marwick, 1965
- Zethalia zelandica (Hombron & Jacquinot, 1855)
