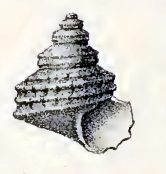

Scientific classification
- Kingdom: Animalia
- Phylum: Mollusca
- Class: Gastropoda
- Subclass: Vetigastropoda
- Order: Trochida
- Family: Trochidae
- Subfamily: Umboniinae
- Genus: Conotalopia
- Species: C. musiva

Binomial name
- Conotalopia musiva (Gould, 1861)

Synonyms
- Gibbula holdsworthana G. Nevill & H. Nevill, 1871; Isanda holdsworthana (G. Nevill & H. Nevill, 1871); Margarita musiva Gould, 1861 (original combination); Minolia (Conotrochus) strigata G. B. Sowerby III, 1894 junior subjective synonym; Minolia charmosyne Melvill, 1918; Minolia charmosyne var. albinella Melvill, 1918; Minolia holdsworthana (G. Nevill & H. Nevill, 1871); Minolia strigata G. B. Sowerby III, 1894 (invalid: junior homonym of Minolia strigata Tenison Woods 1879); Pseudominolia musiva (Gould, 1861); Trochus (Gibbula) holdsworthana (G. Nevill & H. Nevill, 1871) · unaccepted (junior synonym)

= Conotalopia musiva =

Species of gastropod

Conotalopia musiva is a species of sea snail, a marine gastropod mollusk in the family Trochidae, the top snails.

== Description ==
(described as Margarita musiva) The size of the conical shell attains 10 mm. The six whorls are covered with brown checkered spirals. The whorls are bicarinate but the body whorl is tricarinate. The base of the shell is polished and slightly convex. The large umbilicus is conical. The aperture is circular. The columella is barely reflected and ends at the keel of the umbilicus. The horny operculum shows granulate lines of growth.

(Described as Monolia strigata) The height of the shell attains 5 mm, its diameter also 5 mm. The grayish white shell has a conical-turbinate shape and is deeply umbilicate. It has a high spire. It is stained with spots in flames that are generally longitudinally arranged. The shell contains 5–6 whorls that are noticeably bicarinate. They contain oblique fine-drawn stripes. The body whorl is subquadrate, tricarinate and gently convex at its base. It contains radial striae. The deep umbilicus is subcircular and contains numerous slender plicae. The aperture is subcircular. The peristome is simple.

This species is allied to Minolia singaporensis Pilsbry, 1889 but is larger and proportionately shorter, with three prominent keels on the body whorl and one bordering the umbilical cord.

== Distribution ==
This marine species occurs in the Red Sea and off the Philippines and off Hong Kong.
