= Kanakina =

Scientific classification
- Kingdom: Animalia
- Phylum: Mollusca
- Class: Gastropoda
- Subclass: Vetigastropoda
- Order: Trochida
- Family: Trochidae
- Subfamily: Umboniinae
- Genus: Kanakina; D. G. Herbert, 2024

Type species
- Minolia glaphyrella Melvill & Standen, 1895

Genus of gastropods

Kanakina is a genus of sea snails, marine gastropod mollusks in the family Trochidae, the top snails.

== General characteristics ==
(Original description) The shell is turbiniform to depressed‑turbiniform, with the periphery positioned below mid‑whorl. The base is somewhat flattened and umbilicate. The surface is sculptured with fine spiral cords and even finer spiral lirae, while the intervals are filled with close‑set microscopic axial threads. The shell lacks gloss and iridescence, giving it a matte appearance.

The umbilical margin bears a thickened cord that is crenulated by radiating pliculae. Within the umbilicus there is another thickened cord (the funicle), above which lies a narrow, deep sulcus that underlies the insertion of the inner lip. The columella is thickened and somewhat reflected, and it shows distinct swellings at the ends of the umbilical cords. The interior of the outer lip is smooth and becomes slightly thickened subterminally at maturity.

In the operculum, the surface is notable for lacking spiral microsculpture. In the radula, marginal teeth 3–10 carry the largest cusps; each cusp has a large, bluntly lanceolate central denticle that bears a robust pointed denticle at its outer base and a minute denticle at its inner base. Externally, the eyestalks are short and the eyes are small.

== Species ==
- Kanakina glaphyrella (Melvill & Standen, 1895)
