= Vanitrochus padangensis =

Scientific classification
- Kingdom: Animalia
- Phylum: Mollusca
- Class: Gastropoda
- Subclass: Vetigastropoda
- Order: Trochida
- Superfamily: Trochoidea
- Family: Trochidae
- Genus: Vanitrochus
- Species: V. padangensis

Binomial name
- Vanitrochus padangensis (Thiele, 1925)

Synonyms
- Minolia padangensis Thiele, 1925 (original combination)

Species of gastropod

Vanitrochus padangensis is a species of sea snail, a marine gastropod mollusk in the family Trochidae, the top snails.

== Description ==
The size of the shell varies between 2 mm and 3 mm.

== Distribution ==
This marine shell occurs off the Western Sumatra.
