= Tylorhaphe =

Scientific classification
- Kingdom: Animalia
- Phylum: Mollusca
- Class: Gastropoda
- Subclass: Vetigastropoda
- Order: Trochida
- Family: Trochidae
- Subfamily: Umboniinae
- Genus: Tylorhaphe; D. G. Herbert, 2024

Type species
- Tylorhaphe luteopicta D. G. Herbert, 2024

Genus of gastropods

Tylorhaphe is a genus of sea snails, marine gastropod mollusks in the subfamily Umboniinae of the family Trochidae, the top snails.

== General characteristics ==
The shell is small (diameter less than 7.5 mm), depressed trochiform, and umbilicate. The subsutural cord is well developed and either beaded or bearing raised nodules. The periphery is roundly angled or keeled. In the peri‑umbilical region there are radiating pliculae and often strong spiral cords. The umbilical margin is angled and is delineated by a beaded cord, and the umbilicus lacks a funicle. In mature specimens the outer lip is often descendant, and the aperture shows a low subterminal thickening both internally and externally, together with a shallow subperipheral concavity. The protoconch is relatively large, with a diameter of 195–230 µm.

The operculum is corneous and multispiral, with a well‑developed peripheral fringe that is radially striate, and spiral microsculpture is present.

The radula has well‑defined tooth base‑plates in the central field, with the rachidian base‑plate quadrate. The inner marginal tooth is transitional, its cusp reduced and carrying small denticles. The second marginal tooth is clearly the largest, with a robust cusp that bears a large, sharply triangular central denticle and additional smaller denticles at its base on both sides.

== Species ==
- Tylorhaphe alisae D. G. Herbert, 2024
- Tylorhaphe fritillaria D. G. Herbert, 2024
- Tylorhaphe luteopicta D. G. Herbert, 2024
- Tylorhaphe nektonica (Okutani, 1961)
- Tylorhaphe wallacei D. G. Herbert, 2024
