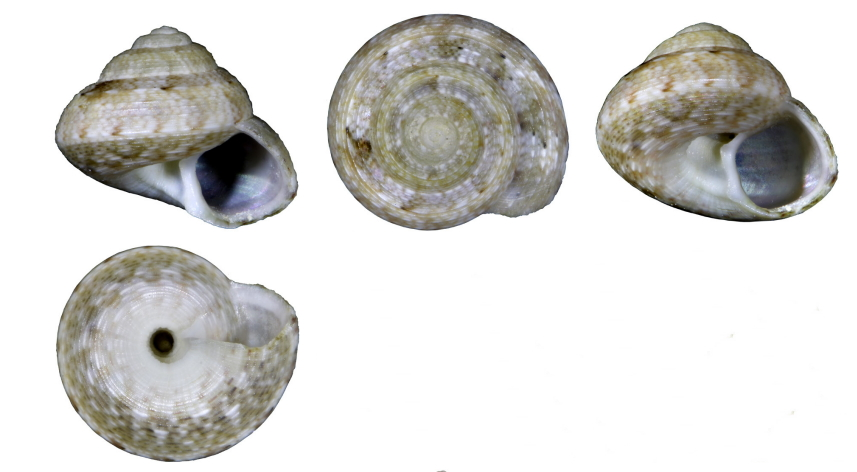
- shell of Kanakina glaphyrella

Scientific classification
- Kingdom: Animalia
- Phylum: Mollusca
- Class: Gastropoda
- Subclass: Vetigastropoda
- Order: Trochida
- Family: Trochidae
- Subfamily: Umboniinae
- Genus: Kanakina
- Species: K. glaphyrella

Binomial name
- Kanakina glaphyrella (Melvill & Standen, 1895)

Synonyms
- Conotalopia glaphyrella (Melvill, J.C. & R. Standen, 1895); Ethminolia glaphyrella (Melvill & Standen, 1895) superseded combination; Minolia glaphyrella Melvill & Standen, 1895 (original description); Monilea glaphyrella (Melvill & Standen, 1895) superseded combination; Sericominolia glaphyrella Williams et al. 2024

= Kanakina glaphyrella =

Species of gastropod

Kanakina glaphyrella is a species of sea snail, a marine gastropod mollusk in the family Trochidae, the top snails.

== Description ==
The size of the rotund-conoidal shell attains 6 mm. A neat little, rather solid species, with a very pale straw colour. The apex is obtuse. The shell contains five, ventricose whorls. The sutures are impressed. The shell is uniformly delicately transversely lirate. Under a lens some very obscure small brown spotted markings on the lirae, and larger spots at the periphery, are observable. The body whorl is subangulate at the periphery and has dark brown spots. The shell has a deep but narrow umbilicus The small aperture is roundish. The outer lip is barely swollen. The margin of the columella is a little contracted.

(More recent description) The shell is small to moderate in size, with a diameter of up to 7.1 mm but usually less than 6.0 mm. It is turbiniform to depressed‑turbiniform (H/D 0.79–0.90). The whorls are at most weakly shouldered, and the periphery lies below mid‑whorl and is only weakly angled. The base is somewhat flattened and bears a moderately broad umbilicus. The surface is sculptured with fine spiral cords and even finer spiral lirae, with close‑set microscopic axial threads in the intervals. The first teleoconch whorl carries three spiral cords, which increase in number as growth proceeds, the adapical cord suggesting a weak shoulder. At the start of the last adult whorl there are about six first‑order spiral cords above and including the periphery, with secondary and sometimes tertiary spirals in the intervals. Basal sculpture is similar, comprising alternating cords and lirae.

The umbilical margin is delineated by a low, broad, thickened cord that is crenulated by radiating pliculae. The interior of the umbilicus is steep‑sided and bears another similar thickened cord (the funicle) just below the insertion of the inner lip on to the paries, above which runs a narrow, deep sulcus that spirals into the umbilicus. The aperture is roundly quadrate. The columella is thickened and somewhat reflected, with distinct swellings at the ends of the umbilical cords. The interior of the outer lip is smooth but becomes slightly thickened subterminally at maturity.

The colour of the shell is dull, lacking gloss or iridescence even when collected alive. The colour pattern typically consists of fine mottling in shades of greenish‑brown on a pale greyish‑white ground, which may be more brownish at the periphery. Green and/or whitish blotches occur below the suture and at the periphery. The spiral cords are marked with alternating white, green, and dark green flecks, the darker markings being most conspicuous on the “shoulder” and peripheral spirals. The umbilicus is paler, often uniformly white. Occasional specimens are more deeply pigmented, with darker brown blotches below the suture and at the periphery; others show a more overall orange‑pink or olive‑brown coloration. The apex is whitish.

The protoconch is typically umboniine, with a diameter of about 170 µm. An apical beak is present and confluent with the terminal lip. The apical bulb is sculptured with oblique and subspiral threads that form an irregular network, almost hexagonal in places, and the terminal lip is weakly convex.

The operculum is corneous and multispiral, but has relatively few whorls and a moderately long growing edge. The peripheral fringe is radially striate, and the surface lacks spiral microsculpture.

The radula has the formula ∞+(1)+5+1+5+(1)+∞ and comprises about 35 transverse rows of teeth. The teeth of the central field are reduced. The rachidian base‑plate is broadly trigonal, with a broad, blunt anterior edge. The base‑plates of the inner lateral teeth are expanded and bluntly rounded basally, with the outer anterior edge somewhat raised and ridge‑like; the outer laterals are less trigonal. The innermost marginal tooth is transitional, with a reduced shaft and cusp, whereas the other marginal teeth are well developed, with a narrow shaft and a strongly recurved cusp. The cusps of the inner marginal teeth bear a large, bluntly lanceolate central denticle, which carries a robust pointed denticle at its outer base and a minute denticle at its inner base (usually hidden by tooth overlap). Marginal teeth 3–10 have the largest cusps, which become progressively smaller farther out; the outermost marginal teeth have finely pectinate margins.

External anatomy (from photographs and rehydrated specimens): The head shows a distinct forehead between the cephalic tentacles. The snout is broad, with a transverse row of digit‑like papillae halfway down its anterior face, and the distal portion of the snout is more finely papillate. Cephalic lappets are not evident. The cephalic tentacles are long, slender, and micropapillate, the left and right being similar in size. The eyestalks are short and not up‑turned, and the eyes are small and black. The left neck‑lobe is more extensive anteriorly, and its edge bears ten or more digit‑like projections, whereas the right neck‑lobe is rolled to form an exhalant siphon.

There are four micropapillate epipodial tentacles on each side, each carrying a well‑developed, stalked epipodial sense organ, often whitish, near its base. An epipodial sense organ is also present beneath each neck‑lobe. The propodium bears a small lateral propodial lobe on each side, and the foot tapers bluntly posteriorly. The head‑foot is mostly pale milky‑white, with the sides of the foot sparsely speckled with greenish‑brown and opaque white pigment granules. The cephalic tentacles show narrow, widely separated transverse dark bands. The ctenidium appears bipectinate, with the anterior portion unattached.

== Distribution ==
This marine species occurs off the Loyalty Islands.
