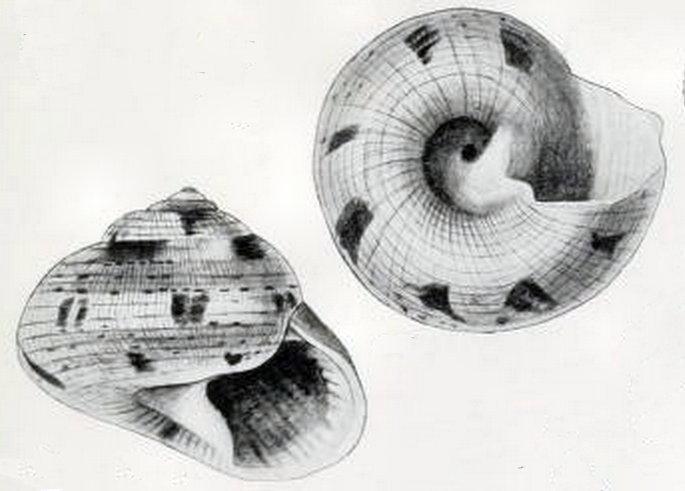
- Original drawing with two views of a shel of Rossiteria nucleolus

Scientific classification
- Kingdom: Animalia
- Phylum: Mollusca
- Class: Gastropoda
- Subclass: Vetigastropoda
- Order: Trochida
- Superfamily: Trochoidea
- Family: Trochidae
- Genus: Rossiteria
- Species: R. nucleolus

Binomial name
- Rossiteria nucleolus (Pilsbry, 1903)

Synonyms
- Monilea (Rossiteria) nucleolus H. Pilsbry, 1903(original description)

= Rossiteria nucleolus =

Species of gastropod

Rossiteria nucleolus is a species of sea snail, a marine gastropod mollusk in the family Trochidae, the top snails.

== Description ==
The height of the shell attains 5.6 mm, its diameter 6.3 mm. The narrowly umbilicateshell has a depressed globose-conic shape. Its color pattern is white with an interrupted buff zone above, and conspicuously variegated with squarish black-brown spots, of which there is a row of broad ones below the suture (three or four on a whorl), a row of smaller ones just above the periphery, and another one on the base. Besides these, there is an irregular articulation or dotting of dark brown on the spiral cords. The glossy surface is sculptured with numerous very low and subequal, nearly smooth spiral threads, almost obsolete on the base, but reappearing on the border of the umbilicus. The surface shows, under a lens, subregular, close, longitudinal grooves, almost obsolete, but visible near the suture and umbilicus. The five whorls are convex. The body whorl is well rounded. The aperture is oblique. The columellar margin is deeply concave in the middle. The columella is abruptly truncate at the base. The outer lip is bevelled to a sharp edge, thickened and spirally lirate within.

== Distribution ==
This marine species occurs off Japan and the Philippines.
