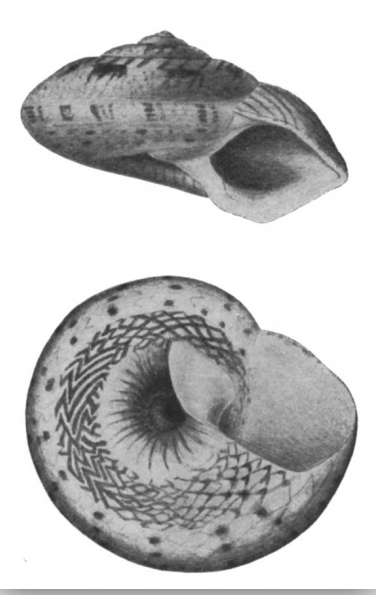
- Two views of a shell of Ethaliella floccata

Scientific classification
- Kingdom: Animalia
- Phylum: Mollusca
- Class: Gastropoda
- Subclass: Vetigastropoda
- Order: Trochida
- Superfamily: Trochoidea
- Family: Trochidae
- Genus: Ethaliella
- Species: E. floccata

Binomial name
- Ethaliella floccata (Sowerby III, 1903)

Synonyms
- Ethalia floccata G. B. Sowerby III, 1903 (original combination); Umbonium floccata G. B. Sowerby III, 1903

= Ethaliella floccata =

Species of gastropod

Ethaliella floccata is a species of sea snail, a marine gastropod mollusk in the family Trochidae, the top snails.

== Description ==
The shell grows to a length of 5 mm, its diameter 9 mm. The shell is much depressed, biconvex, obtusely carinate peripherally and openly umbilicate. Its color is flesh-tinted, with a band below the suture composed of fine obliquely radial dark red lines alternating with white ones. This is followed in the middle of the upper surface by a spiral series of oblique, oblong red blotches alternating with opaque white ones. Below these there is a minutely white-speckled belt, and then at the periphery a series of red spots. On the base of the shell, the umbilicus is fleshy-whitish; outside of this there is a red area closely mottled with opaque white; and between this tract and the periphery there is a pale zone, sometimes marked with distant radial series of two red dots each. The surface is smooth except at and above the periphery, where there are several spiral striae. The 5½ whorls are slightly convex, parted by an impressed suture. The umbilicus is circular and deep, expanding funnel-like at the opening, where the sloping sides are excavated in the middle and finely sulcate radially. The oblique aperture is subcircular. The peristome is obtuse. The columellar margin is broadly dilated, covering a small part of the umbilicus.

== Distribution ==
This marine species occurs off Japan, the Philippines and in the East China Sea.
