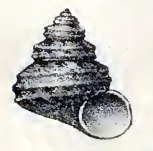
- Original drawing of a shell of Conotalopia singaporensis

Scientific classification
- Kingdom: Animalia
- Phylum: Mollusca
- Class: Gastropoda
- Subclass: Vetigastropoda
- Order: Trochida
- Family: Trochidae
- Subfamily: Umboniinae
- Genus: Conotalopia
- Species: C. singaporensis

Binomial name
- Conotalopia singaporensis (Pilsbry, 1889)

Synonyms
- Minolia (Conotrochus) singaporensis Pilsbry, 1889 (basionym); Minolia singaporensis (Pilsbry, 1889); Monilea singaporensis Pilsbry, 1889

= Conotalopia singaporensis =

Species of gastropod

Conotalopia singaporensis is a species of sea snail, a marine gastropod mollusk in the family Solariellidae.

== Description ==
The height of the shell attains 3 mm, its diameter 2½ mm. The narrowly, deeply umbilicate shell has a conical-turreted shape. it is thin, lusterless, whitish, with a series of obscure brownish blotches below the suture, and a chain of large brown blotches around the outer part of the base. The spire is conical. The minute apex is acute. The sutures are deeply impressed. The shell has about 5 whorls. These are very convex, those of the spire bicarinate The body whorl has two principal carinae and several smaller ones on the base of the whorl. The entire surface is very regularly strongly obliquely crispate-striate. The aperture is almost perfectly circular. It is in contact with the body whorl for only a short distance. The lips are thin, the outer and inner lip equally curved. The deep umbilicus is funnel-shaped.

== Distribution ==
This marine species occurs off Singapore.
