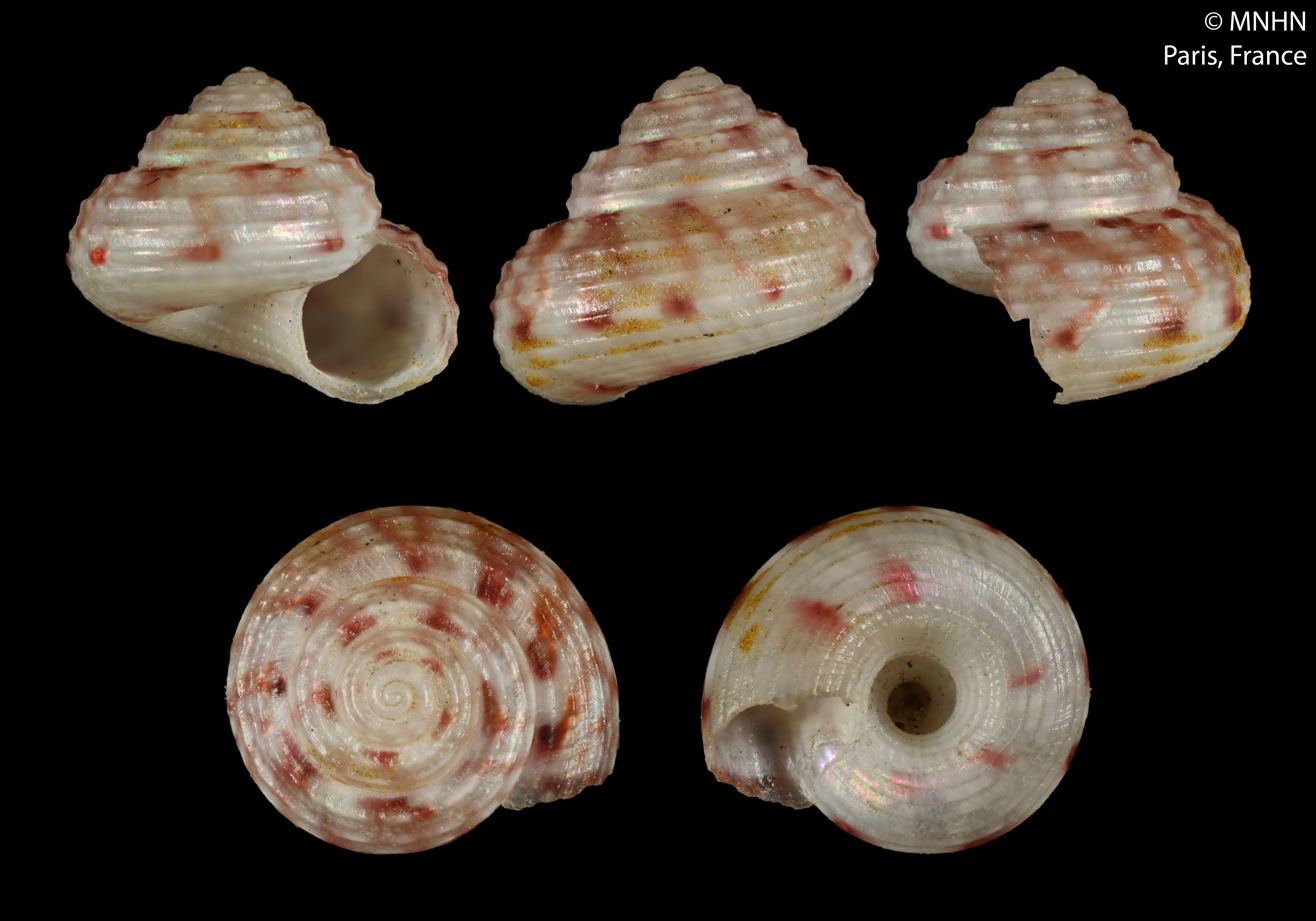
- Shell of Lirularia monodi (holotype at MNHN, Paris)

Scientific classification
- Kingdom: Animalia
- Phylum: Mollusca
- Class: Gastropoda
- Subclass: Vetigastropoda
- Order: Trochida
- Superfamily: Trochoidea
- Family: Trochidae
- Genus: Lirularia
- Species: L. monodi

Binomial name
- Lirularia monodi (Fischer-Piette & Nicklès, 1946)

Synonyms
- Solariella monodi Fischer-Piette & Nicklès, 1946

= Lirularia monodi =

Species of gastropod

Lirularia monodi is a species of sea snail, a marine gastropod mollusk in the family Trochidae, the top snails.

The new combination herein has been created, for consistency with the other entries for similar West African species.

== Description ==
The height of the shell attains 3 mm.

== Distribution ==
This species occurs in the Atlantic Ocean off Senegal and Guinea Bissau.
