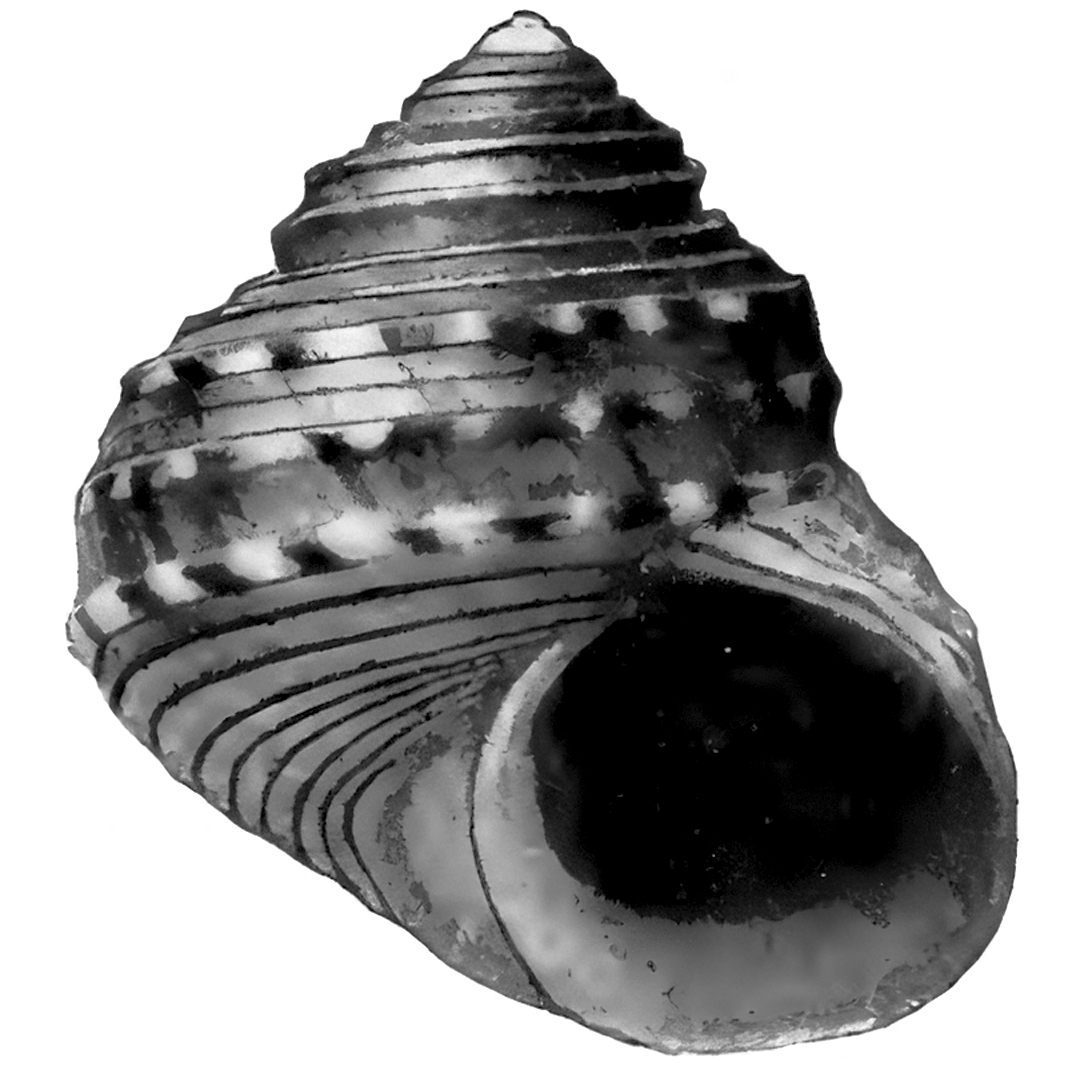
- Image of a shell of Lirularia iridescens

Scientific classification
- Kingdom: Animalia
- Phylum: Mollusca
- Class: Gastropoda
- Subclass: Vetigastropoda
- Order: Trochida
- Superfamily: Trochoidea
- Family: Trochidae
- Genus: Lirularia
- Species: L. iridescens

Binomial name
- Lirularia iridescens (Schrenck, 1863)

Synonyms
- Gibbula fulgens Gould, 1861; Homalopoma kussakini Egorov, 2000; Trochus (Gibbula) iridescens Schrenck, 1863

= Lirularia iridescens =

Species of gastropod

Lirularia iridescens is a species of sea snail, a marine gastropod mollusk in the family Trochidae, the top snails.

== Description ==
The height of the shell attains 7 mm, its diameter 6½ mm.

The thick and solid shell is imperforate or slightly rimate, with a globose-conical shape. It is vividly iridescent under a thin brownish cuticle, with reflections mainly in green and golden hues. The spire is more or less elevated, and the minute apex is acute. The sutures are impressed. The shell has approximately five whorls, which are notably convex. The body whorl is globose and rounded, encircled by about 16 delicate lirae. On the base of the shell, the lirae are closer and more regularly spaced, nearly as wide as the interstices. The lirae are either uniformly brown or articulated with brown and yellowish hues. Occasionally, short brown flammules appear below the sutures. Around the middle of the whorl, the lirae or keels are very widely separated. The aperture is subcircular and almost smooth (slightly sulcate) inside, with vivid iridescence. The columellais arcuate, slightly dilated at the base, and either conceals the perforation above or leaves a narrow chink.

== Distribution ==
This marine species occurs off Japan and in the Northwest Pacific Ocean.
