= Lirularia bicostata =

Scientific classification
- Kingdom: Animalia
- Phylum: Mollusca
- Class: Gastropoda
- Subclass: Vetigastropoda
- Order: Trochida
- Superfamily: Trochoidea
- Family: Trochidae
- Genus: Lirularia
- Species: L. bicostata

Binomial name
- Lirularia bicostata (J. H. McLean, 1964)

Species of gastropod

Lirularia bicostata is a species of sea snail, a marine gastropod mollusk in the family Trochidae, the top snails.

== Description ==
The height of this small species attains 2.4 mm, its diameter 2.3 mm.

== Distribution ==
This marine species occurs in the Pacific Ocean off Baja California, Mexico.
