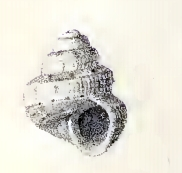
- Vanitrochus tragema

Scientific classification
- Kingdom: Animalia
- Phylum: Mollusca
- Class: Gastropoda
- Subclass: Vetigastropoda
- Order: Trochida
- Superfamily: Trochoidea
- Family: Trochidae
- Genus: Vanitrochus; Iredale, 1929

Type species
- Solariella tragema Melvill & Standen, 1896

Synonyms
- Minolia (Conotrochus) Pilsbry, 1889

= Vanitrochus =

Genus of gastropods

Vanitrochus is a genus of sea snails, marine gastropod mollusks in the family Trochidae, the top snails.

== General characteristics ==
The shell is very small, reaching a height of up to 3.0 mm, and is elevated‑turbiniform, with whorls that are rounded or only weakly shouldered. The sculpture consists of spiral cords crossed by axial riblets, which together produce a fine, regular cancellate pattern. The umbilicus is open, with a rounded margin, and a funicle is lacking. The outer lip is simple, and its interior is smooth.

The operculum is corneous and multispiral, but the outer whorls are relatively broad and have a long growing margin. The peripheral fringe is broad and shows well‑developed radial striation, while the surface carries distinct spiral microsculpture.

In the radula, the rachidian and lateral teeth have laterally rounded base‑plates that overlap extensively. The inner marginal tooth is transitional and lacks a cusp. The cusps of marginal teeth 2–5 are large and somewhat palmate, each bearing about five slender, acuminate denticles, with the middle denticle slightly larger than the others.

== Distribution ==
This marine genus occurs in the Gulf of Oman, Persian Gulf; in the Indian Ocean off Pakistan, Sri Lanka; in the Pacific Ocean off the Loyalty Islands, Tuvalu, New Caledonia and off Australia (Queensland)

== Species ==
Species within the genus Vanitrochus include:

- Vanitrochus geertsi Poppe, Tagaro & Dekker, 2006
- Vanitrochus padangensis (Thiele, 1925)
- Vanitrochus semiustus (Fischer, 1879)
- † Vanitrochus suryai (Beets, 1942)
- Vanitrochus tragema (Melvill & Standen, 1896)

Species brought into synonymy

- Vanitrochus holdsworthiana Nevill, G. & H. Nevill, 1871: synonym of Pseudominolia musiva (Gould, A.A., 1861)
