= Lirularia yamadana =

Scientific classification
- Kingdom: Animalia
- Phylum: Mollusca
- Class: Gastropoda
- Subclass: Vetigastropoda
- Order: Trochida
- Superfamily: Trochoidea
- Family: Trochidae
- Genus: Lirularia
- Species: L. yamadana

Binomial name
- Lirularia yamadana (E. A. Smith, 1875)

Synonyms
- Gibbula yamadana (E.A. Smith, 1875); Trochus (Gibbula) yamadanus E. A. Smith, 1875 (original description)

Species of gastropod

Lirularia yamadana is a species of small sea snail, a marine gastropod mollusk in the family Trochidae, the top snails.

== Description ==
The height of the shell attains 6 mm, its diameter 4½ mm. The ovate-conical, slightly perforate shell is dull whitish. It is painted on the lirae with lilac-brown tessellations, somewhat formed into flammules. The five whorls are convex, and separated by profound sutures, ridged by delicate spiral lirae articulated with lilac-brown (5 to 6 on penultimate, about 20 on the body whorl). The shell shows oblique incremental lines. The pearly aperture is circular, equalling ½ the total length. The columella is a trifle thickened. The terminations of the peristome are joined by a thin callus.

The elongate brownish-lilac spots on the lirations are situated somewhat irregularly underneath each other, so as to form flammulations.

== Distribution ==
This marine species occurs off Japan.
