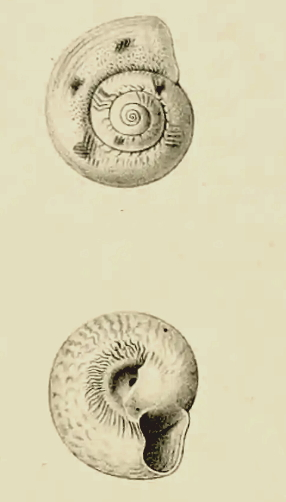
- Shell of Ethaliella rhodomphala (homonym)

Scientific classification
- Kingdom: Animalia
- Phylum: Mollusca
- Class: Gastropoda
- Subclass: Vetigastropoda
- Order: Trochida
- Superfamily: Trochoidea
- Family: Trochidae
- Genus: Ethaliella
- Species: E. rhodomphala

Binomial name
- Ethaliella rhodomphala (E.A. Smith, 1903)

Synonyms
- Ethalia rhodomphala E.A. Smith, 1903

= Ethaliella rhodomphala (homonym) =

Species of gastropod

Ethaliella rhodomphala is a species of sea snail, a marine gastropod mollusk in the family Trochidae, the top snails.

== Taxonomy ==
This name is temporarily accepted as an unreplaced junior homonym of Ethaliella rhodomphala (Souverbie, 1875)

== Description ==
The shell measures 8 mm in maximum diameter, 7 mm in minimum diameter, and 3.75 mm in height.

(Original description in Latin) The shell is orbicular, with the upper surface forming a short cone, and is narrowly and partly covered umbilicate. At the periphery it is sharply angled. The upper surface is whitish, painted with a few scattered dark spots and very fine, irregular, wavy radial lines, and at the periphery it is ornamented with semi‑translucent pink spots. The underside is variegated with irregular, slightly zigzag opaque white lines, and the area around the umbilicus is pink. The six whorls are smooth and glossy; the body whorl is sculptured with a few striae around its mid‑region and is radially plicate around the umbilicus.

The aperture is obliquely subquadrate, pearly and iridescent. The columella is thick, pearly in its central portion, strongly reflected, and white or pink; it is calloused and partly covers the umbilicus.

== Distribution ==
This marine species occurs off the Maldives, New Caledonia and New South Wales (Australia).

The New Caledonian occurrence may actually be Trochus (Monilea) rhodomphalus Souverbie, 1875. This species seems, as Fischer has suggested, close to Trochus rotelloeformis Philippi.
