= Isanda murrea =

- Drawing of a shell of Isanda murrea

Scientific classification
- Kingdom: Animalia
- Phylum: Mollusca
- Class: Gastropoda
- Subclass: Vetigastropoda
- Order: Trochida
- Superfamily: Trochoidea
- Family: Trochidae
- Genus: Isanda
- Species: I. murrea

Binomial name
- Isanda murrea (Reeve, 1848)

Synonyms
- Isander maculosus A. Adams, 1862; Turbo murreus Reeve, 1848 (original combination); Umbonella murrea Reeve, 1863

Species of mollusc

Isanda murrea is a species of sea snail, a marine gastropod mollusc in the family Trochidae, the top snails.

== Description ==
It is a minute turbinate, porcelaneous shell, with narrow umbilicus, its margin crenated. It is smooth, polished, white neatly blotched with pale rose.

== Distribution ==
This marine species occurs off Japan.

== Bibliography ==
- Higo, S., Callomon, P. & Goto, Y. (1999) Catalogue and Bibliography of the Marine Shell-Bearing Mollusca of Japan. Elle Scientific Publications, Yao, Japan, 749 pp.
