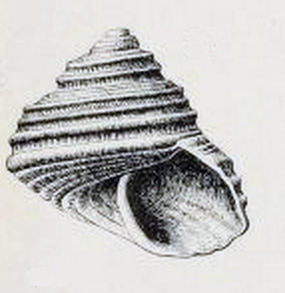
- Drawing of a shell of Lirularia optabilis

Scientific classification
- Kingdom: Animalia
- Phylum: Mollusca
- Class: Gastropoda
- Subclass: Vetigastropoda
- Order: Trochida
- Superfamily: Trochoidea
- Family: Trochidae
- Genus: Lirularia
- Species: L. optabilis

Binomial name
- Lirularia optabilis (Carpenter, 1864)

Synonyms
- Margarita (Lirularia) magna T. Oldroyd, 1920

= Lirularia optabilis =

Species of gastropod

Lirularia optabilis is a species of sea snail, a marine gastropod mollusk in the family Trochidae, the top snails.

This extinct marine species is only known from Pleistocene assemblages of Southern California.
