= Conotalopia minima =

Scientific classification
- Kingdom: Animalia
- Phylum: Mollusca
- Class: Gastropoda
- Subclass: Vetigastropoda
- Order: Trochida
- Family: Trochidae
- Subfamily: Umboniinae
- Genus: Conotalopia
- Species: C. minima

Binomial name
- Conotalopia minima (Golikov, 1967)

Synonyms
- Lirularia minima (Golikov, in Golikov & Scarlato, 1967); Minolia minima Golikov, in Golikov & Scarlato, 1967

Species of gastropod

Conotalopia minima is a species of sea snail, a marine gastropod mollusk in the family Trochidae. Conotalopia minima reproduce through sexual reproduction.

== Description ==
Conotalopia minima has an average lifespan of two years, and their shells grow up to approximately 2mm.

== Distribution ==
Conotalopia minima is native to both the Sea of Japan and the Sea of Okhotsk.
