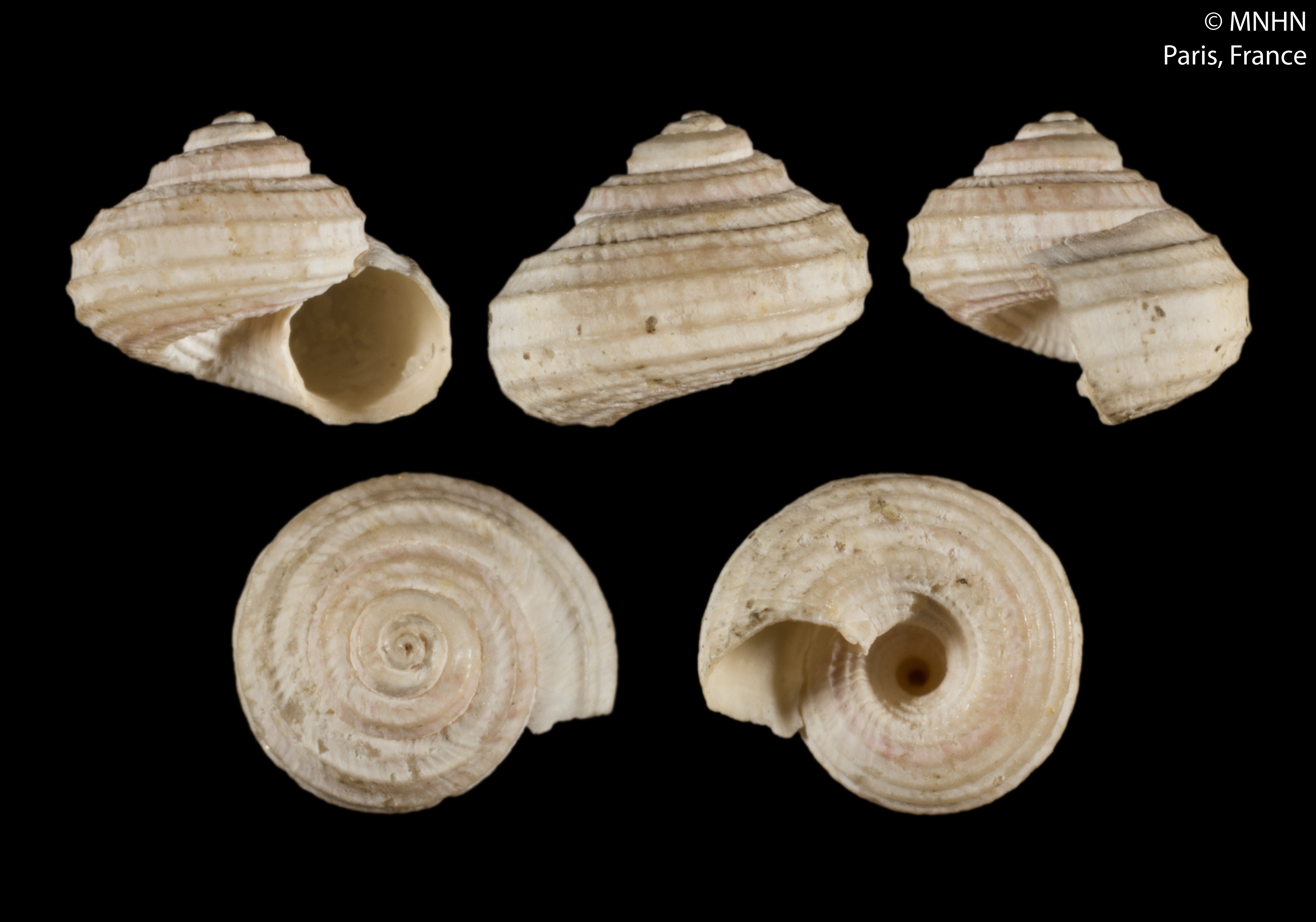
- Shells of Lirularia dereimsi (syntype at MNHN, Paris)

Scientific classification
- Kingdom: Animalia
- Phylum: Mollusca
- Class: Gastropoda
- Subclass: Vetigastropoda
- Order: Trochida
- Superfamily: Trochoidea
- Family: Trochidae
- Genus: Lirularia
- Species: L. dereimsi

Binomial name
- Lirularia dereimsi (Dollfus G.F., 1911)

Synonyms
- Solariella dereimsi Dollfus, 1911

= Lirularia dereimsi =

Species of gastropod

Lirularia dereimsi is a species of sea snail, a marine gastropod mollusk in the family Trochidae.

== Distribution ==
This species occurs in the Atlantic Ocean off São Tomé and Príncipe and off Mauritania and Gambia.
