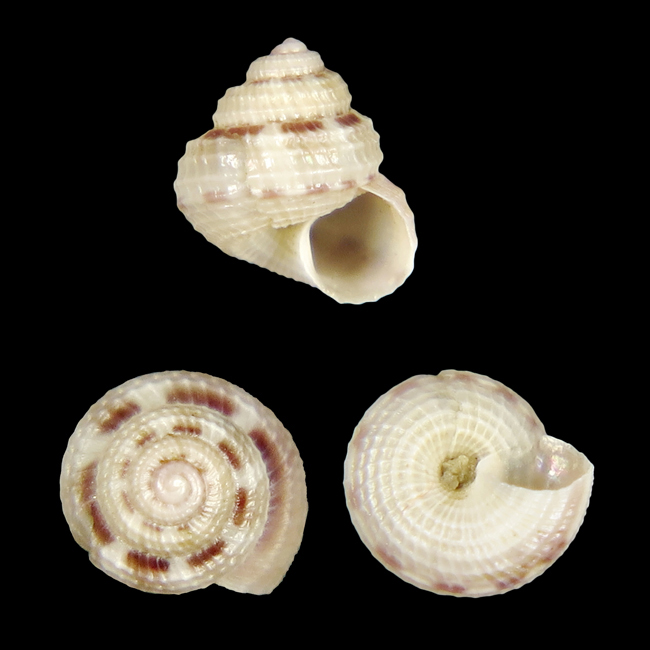

Scientific classification
- Kingdom: Animalia
- Phylum: Mollusca
- Class: Gastropoda
- Subclass: Vetigastropoda
- Order: Trochida
- Superfamily: Trochoidea
- Family: Trochidae
- Genus: Vanitrochus
- Species: V. geertsi

Binomial name
- Vanitrochus geertsi Poppe, Tagaro & Dekker, 2006

= Vanitrochus geertsi =

Species of gastropod

Vanitrochus geertsi is a species of sea snail, a marine gastropod mollusk in the family Trochidae, the top snails.

== Description ==
The size of the shell varies between 2 mm and 3 mm.

== Distribution ==
This marine shell occurs off the Philippines.
