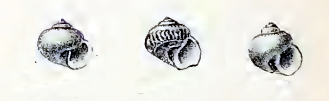
- Isanda coronata shells

Scientific classification
- Kingdom: Animalia
- Phylum: Mollusca
- Class: Gastropoda
- Subclass: Vetigastropoda
- Order: Trochida
- Family: Trochidae
- Genus: Isanda; H. Adams & A. Adams, 1854

Type species
- Isanda coronata A. Adams, 1854

Synonyms
- Isander [lapsus]; Umbonella A. Adams, 1863

= Isanda =

Genus of gastropods

Isanda is a genus of sea snails, marine gastropod mollusks in the family Trochidae, the top snails.

== Description ==
The compact shell of species in this genus has an orbicular-conoidal shape and is porcellanous and polished. The subquadrate aperture is longer than wide, The inner lip is straight, forming an angle with the outer lip. The umbilicus is open (not covered by a callous deposit) and perspective. The margin is crenulated. The multispiral operculum is corneous. The interior has a very thin nacreous layer.

== Species ==
Species within the genus Isanda include:

- Isanda coronata A. Adams, 1854
- Isanda holdsworthana H. Nevill & G. Nevill, 1871
- Isanda murrea (Reeve, 1848)

Species brought into synonymy

- Isanda crenellifera A. Adams, 1862: synonym of Microthyca crenellifera (A. Adams, 1862)
- Isanda lepida A. Adams, 1853: synonym of Isanda coronata A. Adams, 1854
- Isanda pulchella A. Adams, 1855: synonym of Ethaliella pulchella (A. Adams, 1855)
