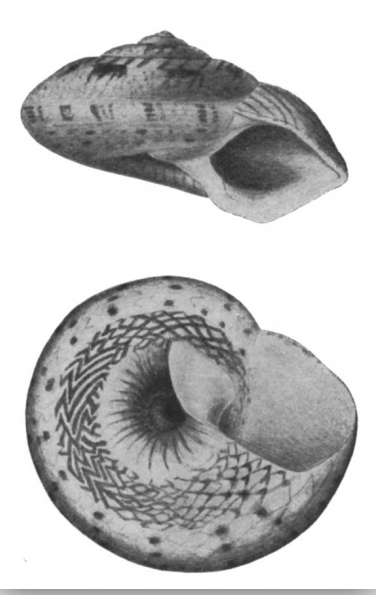
- Ethaliella floccata

Scientific classification
- Kingdom: Animalia
- Phylum: Mollusca
- Class: Gastropoda
- Subclass: Vetigastropoda
- Order: Trochida
- Superfamily: Trochoidea
- Family: Trochidae
- Genus: Ethaliella; Pilsbry, 1905

Type species
- Ethaliella floccata Sowerby, G.B. III, 1903

Synonyms
- Ethalia (Ethaliella) Pilsbry, 1905

= Ethaliella =

Genus of gastropods

Ethaliella is a genus of sea snails, marine gastropod mollusks in the family Trochidae, the top snails.

== General characteristics ==
The shell is small (diameter less than 10 mm), lenticular to trochoid‑turbiniform, and umbilicate. It is smooth or bears fine, close‑set spiral cords, while the axial sculpture is weak. The umbilical rim is thickened, often radially plicate, and sometimes carries a tongue‑like parietal callus lobe; an umbilical funicle is absent.

The operculum is corneous and multispiral, with the outer whorls relatively broad. The peripheral fringe is narrow and radially striate, and spiral microsculpture is present. The radula has thin base‑plates on the rachidian and lateral teeth that are broadly expanded laterally and extensively overlapping, with the anterior edge bearing only a vestige of a shaft. The inner marginal tooth is transitional, and the cusps of marginal teeth 3–8 are the largest and somewhat palmate; the central denticle is rounded and not markedly larger than the others, while the denticles on the outer margin are long and pointed.

== Description ==
This genus is characterized by a depressed, openly umbilicated, smoothish shell. The peristome is obtuse. The columellar margin is dilated, partly vaulting over the umbilicus, which is radially sulcate within and has a very low, wide and rounded marginal cord.

This genus comprises species related to Monilea, Ethalia and Isanda, but with features of the columellar lip and umbilicus unlike either. Minolia and its boreal ally Solariella differ by the almost or quite unexpanded columellar margin.

== Distribution ==
This marine genus occurs off Japan, the Philippines and in the East China Sea.

== Species ==
Species within the genus Ethaliella include:

- Ethaliella capillata (Gould, 1862)
- Ethaliella floccata (Sowerby III, 1903)
- Ethaliella pulchella (A. Adams, 1855)
- Ethaliella rhodomphala (homonym) (E.A. Smith, 1903) (accepted > unreplaced junior homonym)
- Ethaliella rhodomphala (Souverbie, 1875)
