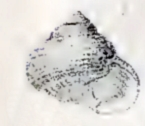
- Drawing of a shell of Rossiteria nucleus

Scientific classification
- Kingdom: Animalia
- Phylum: Mollusca
- Class: Gastropoda
- Subclass: Vetigastropoda
- Order: Trochida
- Superfamily: Trochoidea
- Family: Trochidae
- Genus: Rossiteria
- Species: R. nucleus

Binomial name
- Rossiteria nucleus (Philippi, 1849)

Synonyms
- Gibbula (Rossiteria) nuclea (Philippi, 1849); Monilea (Solanderia) nuclea (Philippi,1849); Trochus nucleus Philippi, 1849 (original description)

= Rossiteria nucleus =

Species of gastropod

Rossiteria nucleus is a species of sea snail, a marine gastropod mollusk in the family Trochidae, the top snails.

== Description ==
The height of the shell attains 9 mm, its diameter also 9 mm. The solid shell is narrowly umbilicate and has a globose-conoida shape. It is whitish, maculated with chestnut, sometimes banded, often punctate and articulated with white dots. The conic spire is acute and short. The sutures are impressed. The 5 to 6 whorls are convex, decussated by spiral lirae and close, strong longitudinal striae. The lirae usually contain intermediate lirulae. The whorls are often a little flattened below the suture, with a slight angle at the shoulder. The body whorl is globose and convex. The aperture is slightly oblique. The outer and basal lips are closely lirate within. The short columella is concave, its edge plicate-denticulate, terminating below in a tooth. The white umbilicus is funnel-shaped. It is margined by a slight convexity terminating below the columellar tooth.

This is a peculiar little species, of globose form, with truncated columella, lirate interior, and finely decussated surface. The color pattern is very variable.

== Distribution ==
This marine species occurs off Madagascar, the Philippines, Japan, the Fiji Islands and the Great Barrier Reef, Australia and New Caledonia.
