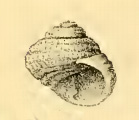
- Drawing of a shell of Lirularia acuticostata

Scientific classification
- Kingdom: Animalia
- Phylum: Mollusca
- Class: Gastropoda
- Subclass: Vetigastropoda
- Order: Trochida
- Superfamily: Trochoidea
- Family: Trochidae
- Genus: Lirularia
- Species: L. acuticostata

Binomial name
- Lirularia acuticostata (Carpenter, 1864)

Synonyms
- Liotia acuticostata Carpenter, 1864

= Lirularia acuticostata =

Species of gastropod

Lirularia acuticostata, common name the sharp-keeled lirularia, is a species of sea snail, a marine gastropod mollusk in the family Trochidae, the top snails.

== Description ==
The height of the shell measures 2.5 mm and its diameter 3 mm. The small, white shell has a subglobose shape. The two nuclear whorls are, smooth. Its apex is elevated. The teleoconch contains 3 whorls, with two raised carinae on the spire and six on the body whorl. The body whorl contains about 6 equal spiral cords. The axial ribs are absent. The sutures are subrectangular. The aperture is circular. The conspicuous outer lip is little contracted. The umbilicus is not large.

== Distribution ==
This marine species occurs off the coast of Sitka, Alaska to the southern Californian coast.
