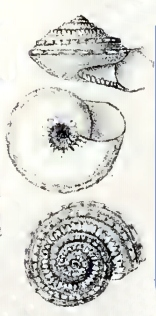
- Several views of a shell of Lirularia canaliculata

Scientific classification
- Kingdom: Animalia
- Phylum: Mollusca
- Class: Gastropoda
- Subclass: Vetigastropoda
- Order: Trochida
- Superfamily: Trochoidea
- Family: Trochidae
- Genus: Lirularia
- Species: L. canaliculata

Binomial name
- Lirularia canaliculata (E.A. Smith, 1871)

Synonyms
- Minolia canaliculata E.A. Smith, 1871; Solariella canaliculata E.A. Smith, 1871

= Lirularia canaliculata =

Species of gastropod

Lirularia canaliculata is a species of sea snail, a marine gastropod mollusk in the family Trochidae.

== Description ==
The height of this small shell measures 3 mm. It is broadly umbilicated, pearly and beautifully prismatic. The spire is depressed-conical. It contains five whorls, the first two are smooth, the remainder spirally lirate, and ornamented beneath the channelled sutures with a series of white tubercles, here and there marked with brown. The body whorl is encircled by chestnut-dotted carinae. The base of the shell contains a purple-brown zone. The umbilicus is perspective, margined by a somewhat tubercular cord. The aperture is subcircular.

== Distribution ==
This species occurs in the Atlantic Ocean off Equatorial Guinea and Angola.
