= Lirularia discors =

Scientific classification
- Kingdom: Animalia
- Phylum: Mollusca
- Class: Gastropoda
- Subclass: Vetigastropoda
- Order: Trochida
- Superfamily: Trochoidea
- Family: Trochidae
- Genus: Lirularia
- Species: L. discors

Binomial name
- Lirularia discors J. H. McLean, 1984

Species of gastropod

Lirularia discors is a species of sea snail, a marine gastropod mollusk in the family Trochidae, the top snails.

== Description ==
The height of the shell attains 4.3 mm, its diameter also 4.3 mm.

== Distribution ==
This species occurs in the Pacific Ocean off Baja California, Mexico.
