= Lirularia antoniae =

Scientific classification
- Kingdom: Animalia
- Phylum: Mollusca
- Class: Gastropoda
- Subclass: Vetigastropoda
- Order: Trochida
- Superfamily: Trochoidea
- Family: Trochidae
- Genus: Lirularia
- Species: L. antoniae

Binomial name
- Lirularia antoniae Rubio & Rolán, 1997

Species of gastropod

Lirularia antoniae is a species of sea snail, a marine gastropod mollusk in the family Trochidae, the top snails.

== Distribution ==
This marine species occurs in the Atlantic Ocean off São Tomé and Príncipe.
