= Ethaliella capillata =

Scientific classification
- Kingdom: Animalia
- Phylum: Mollusca
- Class: Gastropoda
- Subclass: Vetigastropoda
- Order: Trochida
- Superfamily: Trochoidea
- Family: Trochidae
- Genus: Ethaliella
- Species: E. capillata

Binomial name
- Ethaliella capillata (Gould, 1862)

Synonyms
- Ethalia capillata Gould, 1862 (original combination); Umbonium capillata A. A. Gould, 1861

Species of gastropod

Ethaliella capillata is a species of small sea snail, a marine gastropod mollusk in the family Trochidae, the top snails.

== Description ==
The height of the shell attains 4 mm, its diameter 8 mm. The small, smooth shell is convex on both sides. It is slender and angular. It is covered with green or rusty-brown lines that intersect in large numbers, and is ornate with bright striae. It consists of six planulate whorls that become sharp at the periphery. The sutures are scarcely impressed. The base of the shell is radially plicate. The umbilicus is small with a pale callus, surrounded by a rust-colored hollow. The small aperture is rhomboid. The outer lip is acute.

== Distribution ==
This marine species occurs in the East China Sea.
