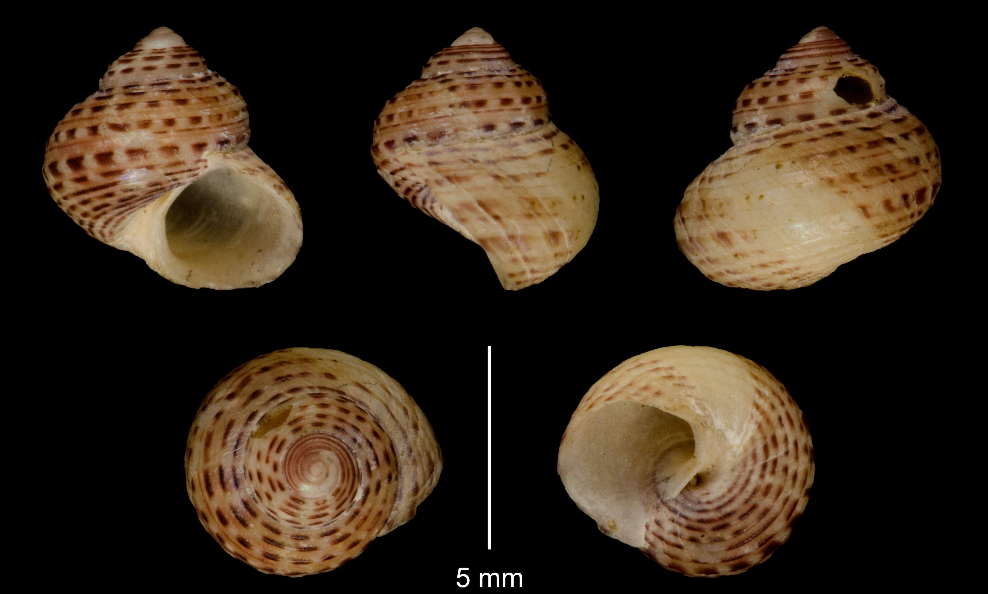
- Shell of Lirularia redimita (holotype at the Smithsonian Institution)

Scientific classification
- Kingdom: Animalia
- Phylum: Mollusca
- Class: Gastropoda
- Subclass: Vetigastropoda
- Order: Trochida
- Superfamily: Trochoidea
- Family: Trochidae
- Genus: Lirularia
- Species: L. redimita

Binomial name
- Lirularia redimita (Gould, 1861)

Synonyms
- Gibbula redimita Gould, 1861 (original combination); Trochus (Gibbula) redimitus E.A. Smith, 1875

= Lirularia redimita =

Species of gastropod

Lirularia redimita is a species of small sea snail, a marine gastropod mollusk or micromollusk in the family Trochidae, the top snails.

== Description ==
The height of the shell attains 3.7 mm, its diameter 4 mm. The depressed, orbicular shell is narrowly perforated. It is greenish-pearly and iridescent. The lirae are ornamented with black. The apex is white. The 4 1/2 whorls are rather convex. They are encircled by 3 or 4 lirae or carinae (on the body whorl about 12, slenderer below). The white umbilicus is small. The large, pearly aperture is circular. The columella is white, somewhat reflexed above, joining the outer lip with a thin callus.

The green pearly surface with the black-dotted spiral keels make the shell of this species immediately recognizable.

== Distribution ==
This marine species occurs off Japan.
