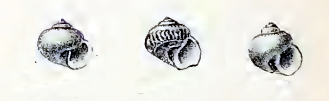
- Drawing with three views of shells of Isanda coronata, showing the inconstant coloration

Scientific classification
- Kingdom: Animalia
- Phylum: Mollusca
- Class: Gastropoda
- Subclass: Vetigastropoda
- Order: Trochida
- Superfamily: Trochoidea
- Family: Trochidae
- Genus: Isanda
- Species: I. coronate

Binomial name
- Isanda coronate A. Adams, 1854

Synonyms
- Isanda lepida A. Adams, 1853; Trochus (Isanda) coronata A. Adams, 1854

= Isanda coronata =

Species of gastropod

Isanda coronata is a species of sea snail, a marine gastropod mollusk in the family Trochidae, the top snails.

== Description ==
The size of the shell varies between 4 mm and 10 mm. The small, solid, umbilicated shell has a depressed-turbinate shape. It is polished, pinkish-white, with oblique, undulating grayish-pink longitudinal stripes. The low spire is conic. The apex is acute. The sutures are deeply channelled, bordered by a corona of tubercles or beads . The shell contains 5 whorls. The large body whorl is rounded or subangular at the circumference and convex beneath. The aperture is higher than wide, slightly oblique and quadrangular. The umbilicus is very deep, rather cylindrical, bordered by a deeply crenated white marginal rib, with a narrower beaded cingulus just outside it.

This is a compact, depressed little shell, with diamond-shaped aperture, showing in fresh specimens a slight trace of pearl within. Adams describes the color as spotted with brown in transverse series, with transverse whitish lines, and a wide subsutural white band. The coloration is very inconstant. The columella is straight, a trifle expanded above, connected with the upper lip by a thin parietal callus.

== Distribution ==
This species is endemic to Australia and occurs off Western Australia, the Northern Territory and Torres Strait.
