= Lirularia pygmaea =

Scientific classification
- Kingdom: Animalia
- Phylum: Mollusca
- Class: Gastropoda
- Subclass: Vetigastropoda
- Order: Trochida
- Superfamily: Trochoidea
- Family: Trochidae
- Genus: Lirularia
- Species: L. pygmaea

Binomial name
- Lirularia pygmaea (Yokoyama, 1922)

Synonyms
- Leptothyra pygmaea Yokoyama, 1922 (original combination)

Species of gastropod

Lirularia pygmaea is a species of sea snail, a marine gastropod mollusk in the family Trochidae, the top snails.

== Description ==
The shell grows to a height of 4 mm.

== Distribution ==
This marine species occurs off Japan.
