= Parminolia =

Scientific classification
- Kingdom: Animalia
- Phylum: Mollusca
- Class: Gastropoda
- Subclass: Vetigastropoda
- Order: Trochida
- Superfamily: Trochoidea
- Family: Trochidae
- Genus: Parminolia; Iredale, 1929

Type species
- Minolia agapeta Melvill & Standen, 1896

Genus of gastropods

Parminolia is a genus of sea snails, marine gastropod mollusks in the family Trochidae, the top snails.

== Species ==
- Parminolia agapeta (Melvill & Standen, 1896)

Taxon inquirendum

- Parminolia pusilla (A. Adams, 1853)

Synonyms

- Parminolia apicina (Gould, A.A., 1861): synonym of Talopena apicina (A. A. Gould, 1861)
