= Ethaliella pulchella =

Scientific classification
- Kingdom: Animalia
- Phylum: Mollusca
- Class: Gastropoda
- Subclass: Vetigastropoda
- Order: Trochida
- Superfamily: Trochoidea
- Family: Trochidae
- Genus: Ethaliella
- Species: E. pulchella

Binomial name
- Ethaliella pulchella (A. Adams, 1855)

Synonyms
- Ethalia pulchella (A.Adams, 1855); Isanda pulchella A. Adams, 1855 (original combination); Umbonium pulchella (A. Adams in H. & A. Adams, 1854)

Species of gastropod

Ethaliella pulchella is a species of sea snail, a marine gastropod mollusk in the family Trochidae, the top snails.

== Description ==
The length of the shell varies between 4 mm and 10 mm. The umbilicate shell has a sublenticular shape and is obtusely angulated. It is smooth, shining, grayish-straw colored, above with little pale greenish-brown angular lines often confluent into wider streaks, below painted with white spots. The spire is a little prominent and contains five whorls. The whitish apex is a little acute. The base around the umbilicus is rather broadly, perspectively, radiately corrugated and angulate. The very oblique aperture has a subrhomboidal shape. Its throat is pearly. The outer lip has a small callus. The whitish peristome is straight and obtuse. The basal margin is arcuate. The columellar margin is expanded in a rosy, tongue-shaped callus, partly covering the umbilicus.

== Distribution ==
This marine species occurs off the Philippines and in the Indo-West Pacific Region.
