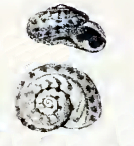
- Camitia rotellina shell

Scientific classification
- Kingdom: Animalia
- Phylum: Mollusca
- Class: Gastropoda
- Subclass: Vetigastropoda
- Order: Trochida
- Superfamily: Trochoidea
- Family: Trochidae
- Genus: Camitia; H. Adams & A. Adams, 1854

Type species
- Camitia pulcherrima Gray, J.E., 1842

= Camitia =

Genus of gastropods

Camitia is a genus of sea snails, marine gastropod mollusks in the family Trochidae, the top snails.

== Description ==
The orbicular shell is, depressed, smooth, and polished. The axis is imperforate. The columella is spirally twisted above, forming a false-umbilicus, with a simple margin. The columella has an edentulate edge and ends in a point.

== Distribution ==
The species in this marine genus occur off China and Japan.

== Species ==
Species within the genus Camitia include:

- Camitia pulcherrima Gray, J.E., 1842
- Camitia rotellina (Gould, 1849)
- † Camitia (Micatia) plicata N.F. Sohl, 1998 (from the Maastrichtian of Jamaica)
