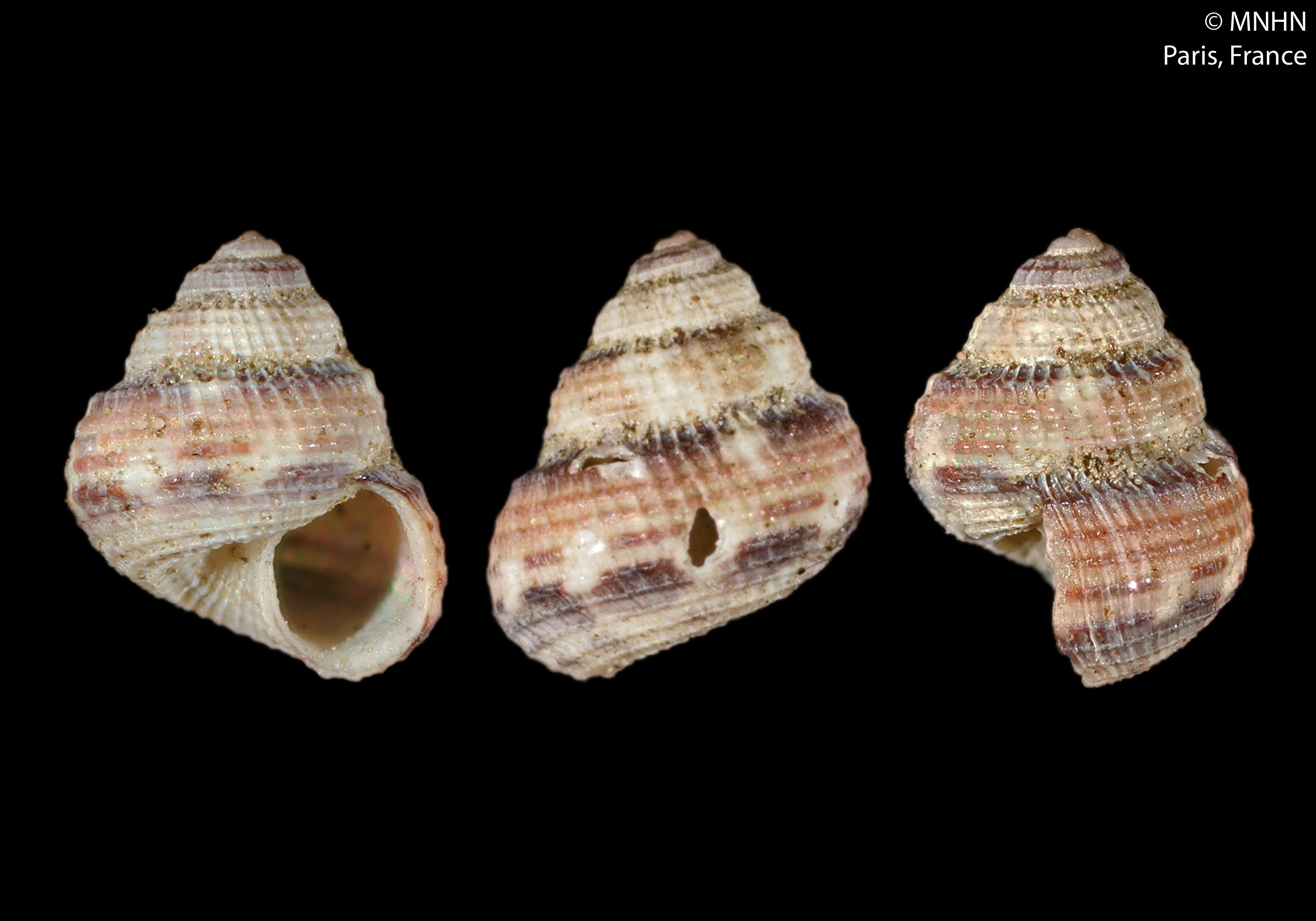
- shell of Vanitrochus semiustus (syntype at MNHN, Paris)
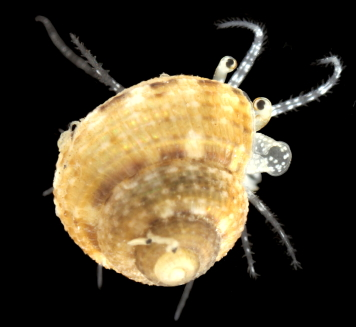
- living specimen

Scientific classification
- Kingdom: Animalia
- Phylum: Mollusca
- Class: Gastropoda
- Subclass: Vetigastropoda
- Order: Trochida
- Superfamily: Trochoidea
- Family: Trochidae
- Genus: Vanitrochus
- Species: V. semiustus

Binomial name
- Vanitrochus semiustus (P. Fischer, 1879)

Synonyms
- Minolia semiusta (Fischer, 1879); Trochus semiustus P. Fischer, 1879; Trochus (Minolia) semiustus Fischer, 1879 (original combination)

= Vanitrochus semiustus =

Species of gastropod

Vanitrochus semiustus is a species of minute sea snail, a marine gastropod mollusk or micromollusk in the family Trochidae, the top snails.

== Description ==
The height of the shell attains 2½ mm, its diameter 2 mm. The very small shell is profoundly umbilicated, and has a conoidal shape. The 5 to 6 whorls are separated by impressed sutures. They are rather convex, planulate at the sutures and subgradate. The color pattern of the first whorl is white the remainder brownish-red, streaked with white, ornamented with a zone of chestnut interrupted with white above. They are spirally lirate, and elegantly clathrate with lamellose radiating striae. There are four spiral cinguli on the penultimate whorl. The convex body whorl is elongated, with a zone of white and chestnut spots at the periphery, convex beneath, whitish or maculate with chestnut, clathrate, with about 4 concentric lirae. The aperture is subrhomboidal. The lip is subduplicate within. The columella is a little arcuate. The umbilical area is funnel-shaped, spirally plicate, and carinated at its edge.

== Distribution ==
This marine shell occurs off New Caledonia and Australia (Queensland).
