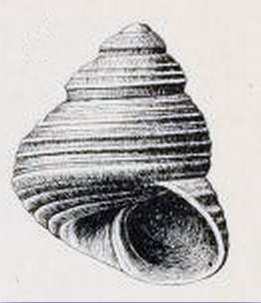
- Drawing of a shell of Lirularia parcipicta

Scientific classification
- Kingdom: Animalia
- Phylum: Mollusca
- Class: Gastropoda
- Subclass: Vetigastropoda
- Order: Trochida
- Superfamily: Trochoidea
- Family: Trochidae
- Genus: Lirularia
- Species: L. parcipicta

Binomial name
- Lirularia parcipicta (Carpenter, 1864)

= Lirularia parcipicta =

Species of gastropod

Lirularia parcipicta, commonly known as the few-spot lirularia, is a species of sea snail, a marine gastropod mollusk in the family Trochidae, the top snails.

== Description ==
The shell grows to a height of 6 mm.

== Distribution ==
This species occurs in the Pacific Ocean from Alaska to Mexico.
