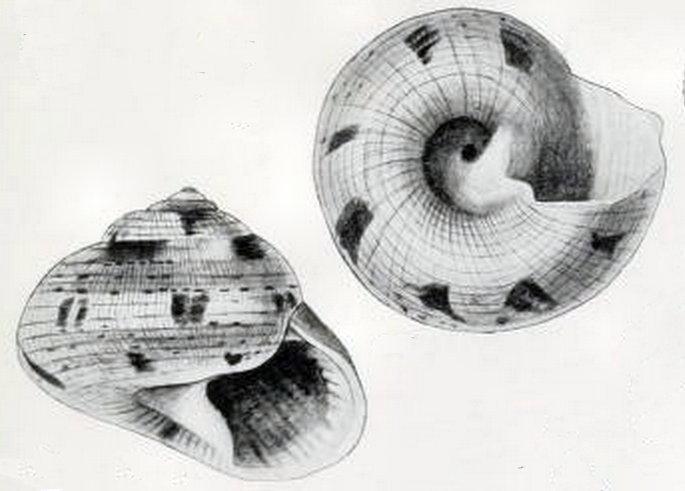
- Original drawing with two views of a shel of Rossiteria nucleolus

Scientific classification
- Kingdom: Animalia
- Phylum: Mollusca
- Class: Gastropoda
- Subclass: Vetigastropoda
- Order: Trochida
- Superfamily: Trochoidea
- Family: Trochidae
- Genus: Rossiteria; Brazier, 1895

Type species
- Trochus nucleus Philippi, R.A., 1849

Synonyms
- Gibbula (Rossiteria) Brazier, 1895 (original rank); Monilea (Rossiteria) Brazier, 1895; Solanderia P. Fischer, 1879 (Invalid: junior homonym of Solanderia Duchassaing & Michelotti, 1846 [Cnidaria]; Rossiteria is a replacement name); Trochus (Solanderia) P. Fischer, 1879 ( junior homonym of Solanderia Duchassaing & Michelin, 1846)

= Rossiteria =

Genus of gastropods

Rossiteria is a genus of sea snails, marine gastropod mollusks in the family Trochidae, the top snails.

== Description ==
The umbilicus is narrow. The columella is arcuate, obliquely plicate, terminating in a strong anterior tooth.

== Species ==
Species within the genus Rossiteria include:

- Rossiteria nucleolus (Pilsbry, 1903)
- Rossiteria nucleus (Philippi, 1849)
- Rossiteria pseudonucleolus Poppe, Tagaro & Dekker, 2006

Species brought into synonymy

- Monilea (Rossiteria) nucleolus Pilsbry, 1903: synonym of Rossiteria nucleolus (Pilsbry, 1903)
