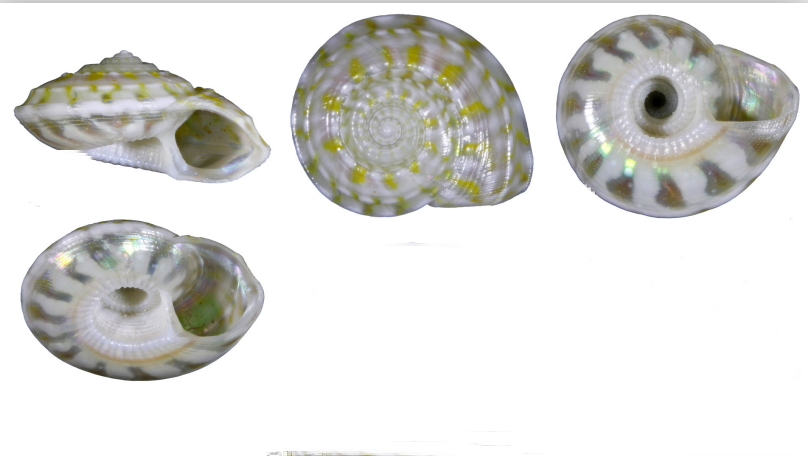
- Shell of Tylorhaphe luteopicta (holotype)

Scientific classification
- Kingdom: Animalia
- Phylum: Mollusca
- Class: Gastropoda
- Subclass: Vetigastropoda
- Order: Trochida
- Family: Trochidae
- Subfamily: Umboniinae
- Genus: Tylorhaphe
- Species: T. luteopicta

Binomial name
- Tylorhaphe luteopicta D. G. Herbert, 2024

= Tylorhaphe luteopicta =

Species of gastropod

Tylorhaphe luteopicta is a species of sea snail, a marine gastropod mollusk in the family Trochidae, the top snails.

== Description ==
The holotype reaches a height of 3.0 mm and a diameter of 5.9 mm, while the largest specimen attains a diameter of 6.5 mm.

The small shell has a diameter of up to 6.5 mm, and is depressed‑trochiform in shape (H/D 0.50–0.63). The teleoconch comprises up to 4.75 whorls. The periphery is sharply angled and keel‑like, positioned close to mid‑whorl, and the suture lies at the same level as the periphery. The base is widely umbilicate.

The first teleoconch whorl is rounded and bears three to four spiral lirae, of which the uppermost is the strongest; this lira strengthens further during the second whorl and delineates a distinct shoulder. The remaining lirae fade out by the beginning of the third whorl. The early axial sculpture consists only of thin, rather widely spaced axial threads, in addition to the axial microsculpture, typical for the subfamily Umboniinae. These threads strengthen during the second whorl to form distinct axial pliculae, which in turn produce beads on the shoulder cord. A low subsutural cord appears during the third whorl, then rapidly strengthens and develops strong, widely spaced nodules.

During the fourth whorl the shoulder cord fades and is replaced by a smooth supraperipheral cord that lies between the periphery and the nodular subsutural cord, though slightly closer to the periphery. The interval between the subsutural and supraperipheral cords forms a broad, bevelled, almost flat slope, on which two to three secondary cords develop close to the subsutural cord. The axial sculpture on this bevelled slope consists of low, indistinct axial pliculae, sometimes reduced to faint growth lines, but becoming more distinct and more closely spaced immediately before the outer lip. The interval between the supraperipheral cord and the periphery is distinctly concave and mostly smooth, although additional spiral lirae may arise in the last half‑whorl. The periphery itself is strongly angled and is crested by two to three fine spiral lirae.

The base carries additional low spiral cords below the periphery, but its mid‑region is smooth or shows only incised striae between low, broad cords. The peri‑umbilical region bears two to three strong cords, the innermost marking the angular umbilical rim. These cords are pleated or beaded by distinct radiating pliculae. The umbilicus is relatively broad, about 0.30 of the maximum shell diameter, with steep‑sided walls that bear fine spiral lirae; a funicle is absent.

The aperture is obliquely D‑shaped, and the peristome is interrupted across the parietal region. The columellar pillar is slightly thickened, and its inner portion has a micropustular surface. The parietal callus is not conspicuously thickened. The outer lip descends below the periphery immediately before its insertion and is somewhat thickened internally, sometimes showing traces of pustules and in‑running ridges; otherwise, the interior is smooth and nacreous, with the external sculpture visible by transparency. In mature specimens the outer lip shows a shallow subperipheral concavity, and its thickening is also visible externally as a slight subterminal swelling. The largest individuals may exhibit a similar, varix‑like swelling about 0.3 whorl behind the outer lip.

The shell is glossy throughout, with a whitish ground colour that sometimes shows a faint pink tinge. The colour pattern consists of bright yellowish blotches below the suture and at the periphery, which sometimes merge to form axial flames. Larger grey‑brown blotches may also be present. The spiral cords are marked by opaque white dots and dashes. On the base, radiating nacreous or pale brownish blotches are separated by the white ground colour, and the peri‑umbilical region sometimes carries a thin, pale brown spiral line. The cord at the umbilical rim is white. The apical whorls are translucent whitish to pale greyish‑white, only rarely pinkish, with the first whorl bearing a row of opaque white dots at the shoulder (Fig. 63I). The apical bulb of the protoconch is opaque white. In specimens from the Solomon Islands, the ground colour may show a more distinct pale pinkish wash.

The protoconch is typically umboniine, with a diameter of approximately 195–210 µm. An apical beak is present and confluent with the terminal lip. The apical bulb is mostly worn but retains traces of an irregular network of fine threads. The terminal lip is weakly convex and slightly thickened.

The operculum is corneous and multispiral, with a peripheral fringe that shows clear radial striation. The radial striations persist where the whorls overlap, and the surface bears a distinct spiral microsculpture.

The radula has the formula ∞+(1)+5+1+5+(1)+∞ and consists of 30–35 transverse rows of teeth. The teeth of the central field are reduced, although the base‑plates remain moderately robust. The rachidian base‑plate is broad and roundly quadrate, while the base‑plates of the lateral teeth become progressively more trigonal, expanded and bluntly rounded basally, extensively overlapping, with the outer anterior edge somewhat raised; the fifth lateral is more nearly quadrate. The innermost marginal tooth is transitional, with a robust base‑plate, a reduced shaft, and a cusp that carries approximately five small denticles of similar size. The second marginal is clearly the largest tooth, its robust cusp bearing a large triangular central denticle flanked at the base by three to five smaller denticles on each side. The cusps of the subsequent marginal teeth are similar but become progressively smaller and more finely denticulate.

External anatomy (from rehydrated specimen): The head shows a distinct forehead between the cephalic tentacles. The snout is moderately long, cylindrical, and distally papillate. Cephalic lappets are not evident. The cephalic tentacles are long and slender, micropapillate, and the eyestalks are long, with conspicuously expanded tips that contain large black eyes. The left neck‑lobe is small and digitate, whereas the right neck‑lobe is rolled to form an exhalant siphon. The epipodial tentacles are micropapillate; although their exact number on each side is not determined, epipodial sense organs are evident. The propodium is indented along the mid‑line and bears a lateral propodial lobe on each side. The foot is flattened, with a broad sole that tapers posteriorly. The head‑foot is translucent cream‑white, with opaque white pigmentation on the snout, eyestalks, propodial lobes, sides of the foot, and metapodium.

== Distribution ==
This marine species occurs off the northern Lord Howe Ridge to New Caledonia and the Solomon Islands.
