= Umboniinae =

Scientific classification
- Kingdom: Animalia
- Phylum: Mollusca
- Class: Gastropoda
- Subclass: Vetigastropoda
- Order: Trochida
- Superfamily: Trochoidea
- Family: Trochidae
- Subfamily: Umboniinae; H. Adams & A. Adams, 1854 (1840)

Synonyms
- Bankiviini Hickman & J. H. McLean, 1990; Isandini Hickman, 2003; Lirulariinae Hickman & J. H. McLean, 1990; Monileini Hickman & J. H. McLean, 1990; Talopiidae Finlay, 1928; Talopiini Finlay, 1928; Umboniidae H. Adams & A. Adams, 1854 (1840) superseded rank

Subfamily of gastropods

The Umboniinae are a taxonomic subfamily of very small to large sea snails, marine gastropod molluscs in the family Trochidae, common name top snails.

== General characteristics ==
(Original description) The rostrum is rudimentary, while the frontal lobes are greatly developed. The operculum is horny and thin, composed of many gradually enlarging whorls, and is finely ciliated along its outer edge. The shell is orbicular, depressed, polished, and porcellanous, with the umbilical region often covered by a callous deposit.

The Umboniinae H. Adams & A. Adams, 1854 (1840) comprise a well-defined subfamily within the Trochidae Rafinesque, 1815, characterised primarily by their unusual radula with reduced teeth in the central field. Additional distinctive morphological features are also commonly present, such as long up-curving eyestalks with large eyes, a subterminally papillate snout and a medially bifid propodium with pinched-in, trigonal antero-lateral lobes.

== Genera ==
- Antisolarium H. J. Finlay, 1926
- Bankivia Krauss, 1848
- Camitia J. E. Gray, 1842
- Conotalopia Iredale, 1929
- Ethalia H. Adams & A. Adams, 1854
- Ethaliella Pilsbry, 1905
- Ethminolia Iredale, 1924
- Inkaba D. G. Herbert, 1992
- Isanda H. Adams & A. Adams, 1854
- Kanakina D. G. Herbert, 2024
- Leiopyrga H. Adams & A. Adams, 1863
- Lirularia Dall, 1909
- Monilea Swainson, 1840
- Parminolia Iredale, 1929
- Pseudominolia D. G. Herbert, 1992
- Rossiteria Brazier, 1895
- Sericominolia Kuroda & T. Habe, 1954
- Talopena Iredale, 1918
- Tylorhaphe D. G. Herbert, 2024
- Umbonium Link, 1807
- Vanitrochus Iredale, 1929
- Zethalia H. J. Finlay, 1926

== Synonyms ==
- Genus Awajitrochus T. Habe, 1958: synonym of Conotalopia Iredale, 1929 (junior subjective synonym)
- Tribe Bankiviini Hickman & J. H. McLean, 1990: synonym of Umboniinae H. Adams & A. Adams, 1854 (1840)
- Genus Conotrochus Pilsbry, 1889: synonym of Pagodatrochus D. G. Herbert, 1989 (junior primary homonym of Conotrochus Seguenza, 1864 (Cnidaria))
- Genus Ethaliopsis Cossmann, 1918: synonym of Zethalia H. J. Finlay, 1926 (Invalid as preoccupied by Schepman, 1908; Zethalia Finlay, 1926 is replacement name)
- Genus Globulus Schumacher, 1817: synonym of Umbonium Link, 1807 (junior objective synonym)
- Genus Isander [sic]: synonym of Isanda H. Adams & A. Adams, 1854 (incorrect subsequent spelling of Isanda H. & A. Adams, 1854, in A. Adams (1862))
- Tribe Isandini Hickman, 2003: synonym of Umboniinae H. Adams & A. Adams, 1854 (1840)
- Tribe Monileini Hickman & J. H. McLean, 1990: synonym of Umboniinae H. Adams & A. Adams, 1854 (1840)
- Genus Monilia [sic]: synonym of Monilea Swainson, 1840 (Incorrect subsequent spelling)
- Genus Rotella Lamarck, 1822: synonym of Umbonium Link, 1807 (junior subjective synonym)
- Genus Solanderia P. Fischer, 1879: synonym of Rossiteria Brazier, 1895 (junior homonym, junior homonym of Solanderia Duchassaing & Michelotti, 1846 [Cnidaria]; Rossiteria is a replacement name)
- Genus Suchium Makiyama, 1924: synonym of Umbonium Link, 1807 (junior subjective synonym)
- Genus Talopia J. E. Gray, 1842: synonym of Monilea Swainson, 1840 (junior objective synonym)
- Tribe Talopiini Finlay, 1928: synonym of Umboniinae H. Adams & A. Adams, 1854 (1840)
- Genus Umbonella A. Adams, 1863: synonym of Isanda H. Adams & A. Adams, 1854 (junior subjective synonym

== Sources ==
- Finlay, H. J. (1928). The Recent Mollusca of the Chatham Islands. Transactions of the New Zealand Institute. 59: 232-286.
- Hickman, C.S. 1998. Subfamily Umboniinae. pp. 689-690 in Beesley, P.L., Ross, G.J.B. & Wells, A. (eds). Mollusca: The Southern Synthesis. Fauna of Australia. Melbourne : CSIRO Publishing Vol. 5(Part B) pp. vi–viii, 565–1234.
- Hickman, C.S. (2003). Functional morphology and mode of life of Isanda coronata (Gastropoda: Trochidae) in an Australian macrotidal sandflat. Pp. 69–88, in: Wells, F.D., Walker, D.I. & Jones, D.S. (eds) The Marine Flora and Fauna of Dampier, Western Australia. Western Australia Museum, Perth.
- Moore, R.C. (ed.) 1960. Treatise on Invertebrate Paleontology. Part I. Mollusca 1. Boulder, Colorado & Lawrence, Kansas : Geological Society of America & University of Kansas Press xxiii + 351 pp.
- Poppe, G.T., Tagaro, S.P. & Dekker, H. 2006. The Seguenziidae, Chilodontidae, Trochidae, Calliostomatidae and Solariellidae of the Philippine Islands. Visaya, Supplement 2: 1-228
- Williams, S.T., Karube, S. & Ozawa, T. 2008. Molecular systematics of Vetigastropoda: Trochidae, Turbinidae and Trochoidea redefined. Zoologica Scripta 37(5): 483-506
- Wilson, B. 1993. Australian Marine Shells. Prosobranch Gastropods. Kallaroo, Western Australia : Odyssey Publishing Vol. 1 408 pp.
