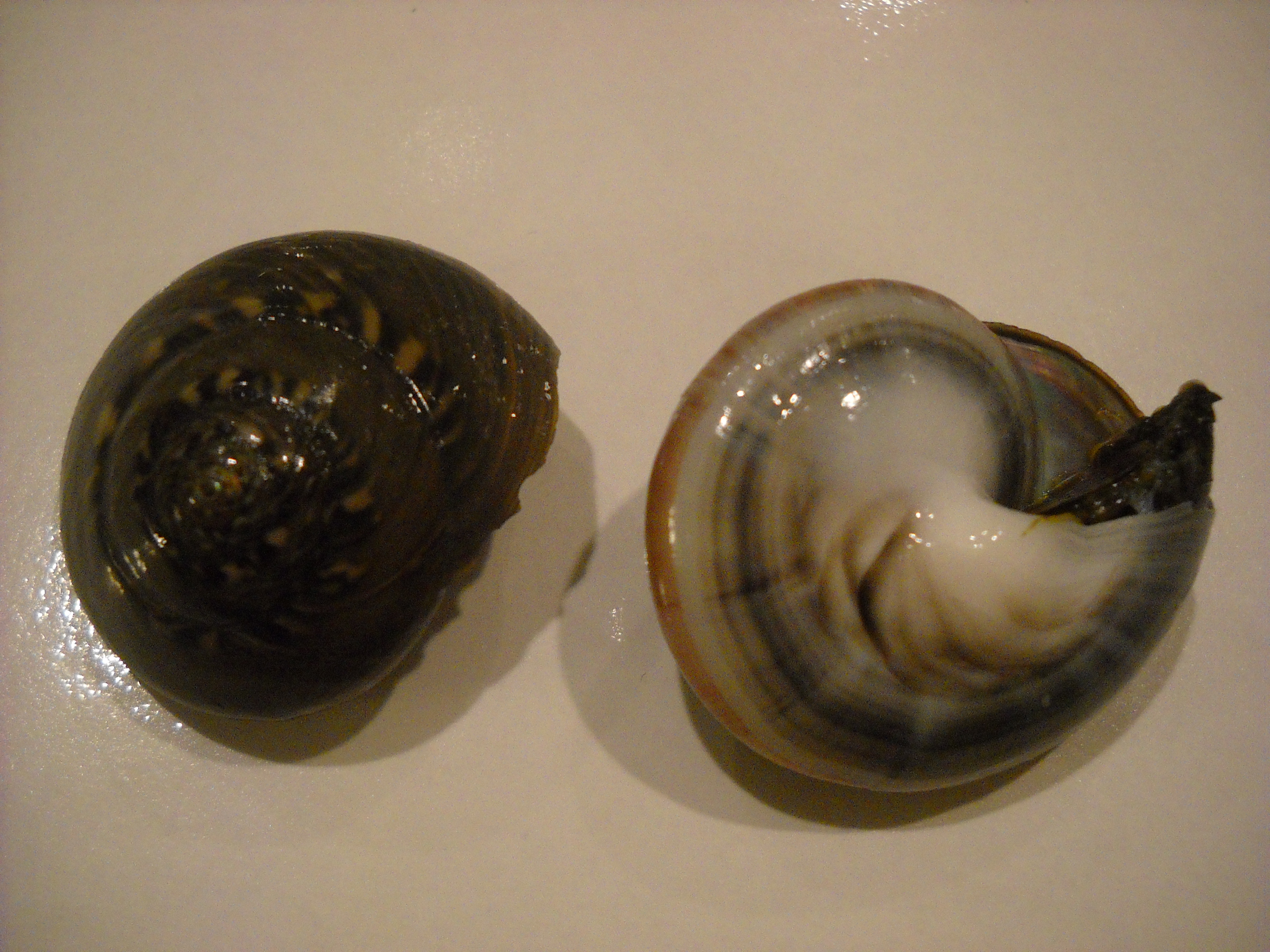
- Two views of a shell of Umbonium giganteum

Scientific classification
- Kingdom: Animalia
- Phylum: Mollusca
- Class: Gastropoda
- Subclass: Vetigastropoda
- Order: Trochida
- Superfamily: Trochoidea
- Family: Trochidae
- Genus: Umbonium; Link, 1807

Type species
- Trochus vestiarius Linnaeus, 1758

Synonyms
- Globulus Schumacher, 1817 (objective synonym of Umbonium); Rotella Lamarck, 1822; Suchium Makiyama, 1924

= Umbonium =

Genus of gastropods

Umbonium, sometimes known as the "button top shells", is a genus of sea snails, marine gastropod molluscs in the family Trochidae, the top snails.

== Shell description ==
The shells of the species in this genus are low-spired and shaped like a button. The orbicular shell is depressed and imperforated. It is polished, porcellaneous and has a very thin pearly layer inside. The whorls are flattened above, bright, smooth or spirally grooved. The small, transverse aperture is wider than high. The thin outer lip is acute. The inner lip is rounded, ending in a simple point. The umbilicus of the shell is often completely covered with a thick and smooth callus.

== Anatomy ==
The animal has a distinct lateral fringe of the foot, with three filaments on each side. The front of the right side near the base of the tentacles is produced into a fleshy lobe. The right tentacle is free, with the eye-peduncle compressed, and bears a rudimentary eye. The left eye-peduncle is cylindrical, with a distinct eye, and furnished with an expansion or frontal lobe, which is folded on itself and fringed at its free margin. The operculum is horny, orbicular, and multispiral.

== Species ==
Species in the genus Umbonium include:

- Umbonium callosum Sowerby, 1887
- Umbonium conicum (A. Adams & Reeve, 1850)
- Umbonium costatum (Valenciennes in Kiener, 1838 in 1834-50)
- Umbonium elegans (Kiener, 1838)
- Umbonium eloiseae Dance, Moolenbeek & Dekker, 1992
- Umbonium giganteum (Lesson, 1833)
- Umbonium moniliferum (Lamarck, 1822)
- Umbonium sagittatum (Hinds, 1845)
- Umbonium suturale (Lamarck, 1822)
- Umbonium thomasi (Crosse, 1862)
- Umbonium vestiarium (Linnaeus, 1758)

Species brought into synonymy

- Umbonium adamsi Dunker: synonym of Umbonium thomasi (Crosse, 1862)
- Umbonium bairdii Dall, 1889: synonym of Margarites bairdii (Dall, 1889)
- Umbonium capillata A. A. Gould, 1861 : synonym of Ethaliella capillata (Gould, 1862)
- Umbonium depressum Adams, 1853: synonym of Umbonium vestiarium (Linnaeus, 1758)
- Umbonium floccata G. B. Sowerby III, 1903 : synonym of Ethaliella floccata (Sowerby III, 1903)
- Umbonium guamense Adams, A. 1855: synonym of Ethalia guamensis (Quoy & Gaimard, 1834)
- Umbonium guamensis J. R. C. Quoy & J. P. Gaimard, 1834 : synonym of Ethalia guamensis (Quoy & Gaimard, 1834)
- Umbonium guamensis selenomphala H. A. Pilsbry, 1905 : synonym of Ethalia guamensis (Quoy & Gaimard, 1834)
- Umbonium javanicum A. Adams, 1853: synonym of Umbonium moniliferum (Lamarck, 1822)
- Umbonium nitida (A. Adams, 1863) : synonym of Ethalia nitida A. Adams, 1863
- Umbonium omphalotropis (A. Adams, 1863) : synonym of Ethalia omphalotropis A. Adams, 1863
- Umbonium polita (A. Adams, 1862) : synonym of Ethalia polita A. Adams, 1862
- Umbonium pulchella (A. Adams in H. & A. Adams, 1854) : synonym of Ethaliella pulchella (A. Adams, 1855)
- Umbonium rufula ( A. A. Gould, 1861) : synonym of Ethalia rufula Gould, 1861
- Umbonium sanguinea H. A. Pilsbry, 1905 : synonym of Ethalia sanguinea Pilsbry, 1905
- Umbonium striolatum Adams A., 1855: synonym of Ethalia striolata (A. Adams, 1855)
- Umbonium zelandica (Hombron & Jacquinot, 1855): synonym of Zethalia zelandica (Hombron & Jacquinot, 1855)
