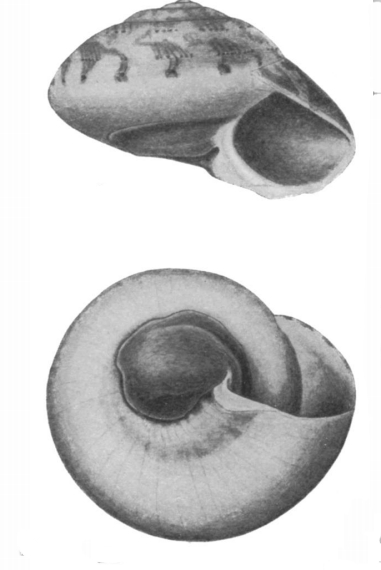
- Two views of a shell of Ethalia sanguinea

Scientific classification
- Kingdom: Animalia
- Phylum: Mollusca
- Class: Gastropoda
- Subclass: Vetigastropoda
- Order: Trochida
- Superfamily: Trochoidea
- Family: Trochidae
- Subfamily: Umboniinae
- Genus: Ethalia; H. Adams & A. Adams, 1854

Type species
- Rotella guamensis Quoy & Gaimard, 1834

Synonyms
- Teinostoma (Ethalia) H. Adams & A. Adams, 1854 superseded rank; Trochus (Liotrochus) P. Fischer, 1878 junior subjective synonym; Umbonium (Ethalia) H. Adams & A. Adams, 1854

= Ethalia =

Genus of gastropods

Ethalia is a genus of sea snails, marine gastropod mollusks in the subfamily Umboniinae of the family Trochidae, the top snails.

== Description ==
The species are moderate-sized. The orbicular shell is turbinately depressed. The whorls are convex, smooth or transversely striated, the last one rounded at the periphery. They have a mottled or streaked color-pattern. The umbilicus is partly closed by a callus deposit. The columellar lip ends anteriorly in an obtuse dilated callus. The callus emitted at the columellar-parietal angle of the aperture is tongue-shaped, closing the umbilicus except a rather narrow chink, or even entirely, in some species.

(More recent description) The shell is relatively large for the subfamily Umboniinae (up to 25 mm in diameter); It is lenticular, globose-lenticular, or subglobose; the surface is smooth and glossy, or dull with fine, closely spaced spiral lirae; the axial sculptureis weak or nearly obsolete. The umbilicus is usually present, commonly bordered by a thickened rim and variably obstructed by a callus deposition associated with the umbilical funicle and parietal lip. The outer lip is simple, with a smooth inner surface lacking denticles or lirae. The operculum is corneous, thick, multispiral but only loosely coiled; whorl overlap narrow, the peripheral fringe is scarcely developed, and spiral microsculpture is absent. The radula is with relatively robust base-plates on both the rachidian and lateral teeth; inner marginal tooth transitional, bearing a reduced terminal cusp. Outer marginal teeth with 3–10 principal cusps, dominated by a large, bluntly lanceolate central denticle that is flanked basally on its outer side by one or two smaller accessory denticles. The ctenidium is bipectinate, with the anterior portion remaining free.

== Distribution ==
This marine genus occurs in the Central and East Indian Ocean, off East Africa, off Indo-Malaysia, and off Australia.

== Species ==
Species within the genus Ethalia include:

- Ethalia anomphala D. G. Herbert, 2024
- Ethalia azorensis (R. B. Watson, 1879)
- Ethalia bellardii (Issel, 1869)
- Ethalia bysma Herbert, 1992
- Ethalia carneolata Melvill, 1897
- Ethalia catharinae Poppe, Tagaro & Dekker, 2006
- Ethalia electra Herbert, 1992
- Ethalia gilchristae Herbert, 1992
- Ethalia guamensis (Quoy & Gaimard, 1834)
- Ethalia lampra (R. B. Watson, 1880)
- Ethalia minolina Melvill, 1897
- Ethalia montrouzieri (Souverbie, 1859)
- Ethalia nitida A. Adams, 1863 (uncertain > unassessed)
- Ethalia omphalotropis A. Adams, 1863 (uncertain > unassessed, use in recent literature not established by editor)
- Ethalia polita A. Adams, 1862(uncertain > unassessed, use in recent literature not established by editor)
- Ethalia rufula Gould, 1861
- Ethalia sanguinea Pilsbry, 1905
- Ethalia striolata (A. Adams, 1855)
- † Ethalia subpulchella MacNeil, 1961
- Ethalia variegata (Preston, 1914)

Species brought into synonymy

- Ethalia (Ethaliella) Pilsbry, 1905: synonym of Ethaliella Pilsbry, 1905
- Ethalia africana E. A. Smith, 1904: synonym of Teinostoma africanum (E. A. Smith, 1904) (original combination)
- Ethalia atomaria A. Adams, 1861: synonym of Teinostoma atomaria (A. Adams, 1861) (original combination)
- Ethalia brazieri Angas, 1877: synonym of Rotostoma brazieri (Angas, 1877)
- Ethalia candida A. Adams, 1862: synonym of Leucorhynchia candida (A. Adams, 1862)
- Ethalia capillata Gould, 1862: synonym of Ethaliella capillata (Gould, 1862)
- Ethalia carinata P. P. Carpenter, 1857: synonym of Solariorbis carinatus (P. P. Carpenter, 1857)
- Ethalia diotrephes Melvill, 1910 : synonym of Teinostoma diotrephes (Melvill, 1910) (original combination)
- Ethalia floccata G. B. Sowerby III, 1903: synonym of Ethaliella floccata (Sowerby, 1903)
- Ethalia jucunda Melvill, 1904: synonym of Teinostoma jucundum (Melvill, 1904) (superseded combination)
- Ethalia lirata E.A. Smith, 1871: synonym of Leucorhynchia lirata (E.A. Smith, 1871)
- Ethalia multistriata A. E. Verrill, 1884: synonym of Solariorbis multistriatus (A. E. Verrill, 1884)
- Ethalia pallidula P. P. Carpenter, 1857: synonym of Teinostoma pallidulum (P. P. Carpenter, 1857)
- Ethalia perspicua A. Adams, 1861: synonym of Teinostoma perspicuum (A. Adams, 1861)
- Ethalia philippii (A. Adams, 1855): synonym of Monilea philippii A. Adams, 1855
- Ethalia plicata E. A. Smith, 1872: synonym of Leucorhynchia plicata (E. A. Smith, 1872)
- Ethalia pulchella (A. Adams, 1855): synonym of Ethaliella pulchella (A. Adams, 1855)
- Ethalia pusilla (H. Adams, 1869): synonym of Cancellaria pusilla H. Adams, 1869: synonym of Brocchinia canariensis Rolán & Hernández, 2009 (superseded combination)
- Ethalia pyricallosa P. P. Carpenter, 1857: synonym of Solariorbis pyricallosus (P. P. Carpenter, 1857)
- Ethalia rhodomphala E. A. Smith, 1903: synonym of Ethaliella rhodomphala (E. A. Smith, 1903) (original combination)
- Ethalia sobrina A. Adams, 1861: synonym of Lissotesta sobrina (A. Adams, 1861)
- Ethalia supravallata P. P. Carpenter, 1864: synonym of Teinostoma supravallatum (P. P. Carpenter, 1864)
- Ethalia tasmanica Tenison Woods, 1877: synonym of Modulus modulus (Linnaeus, 1758) (junior synonym)
