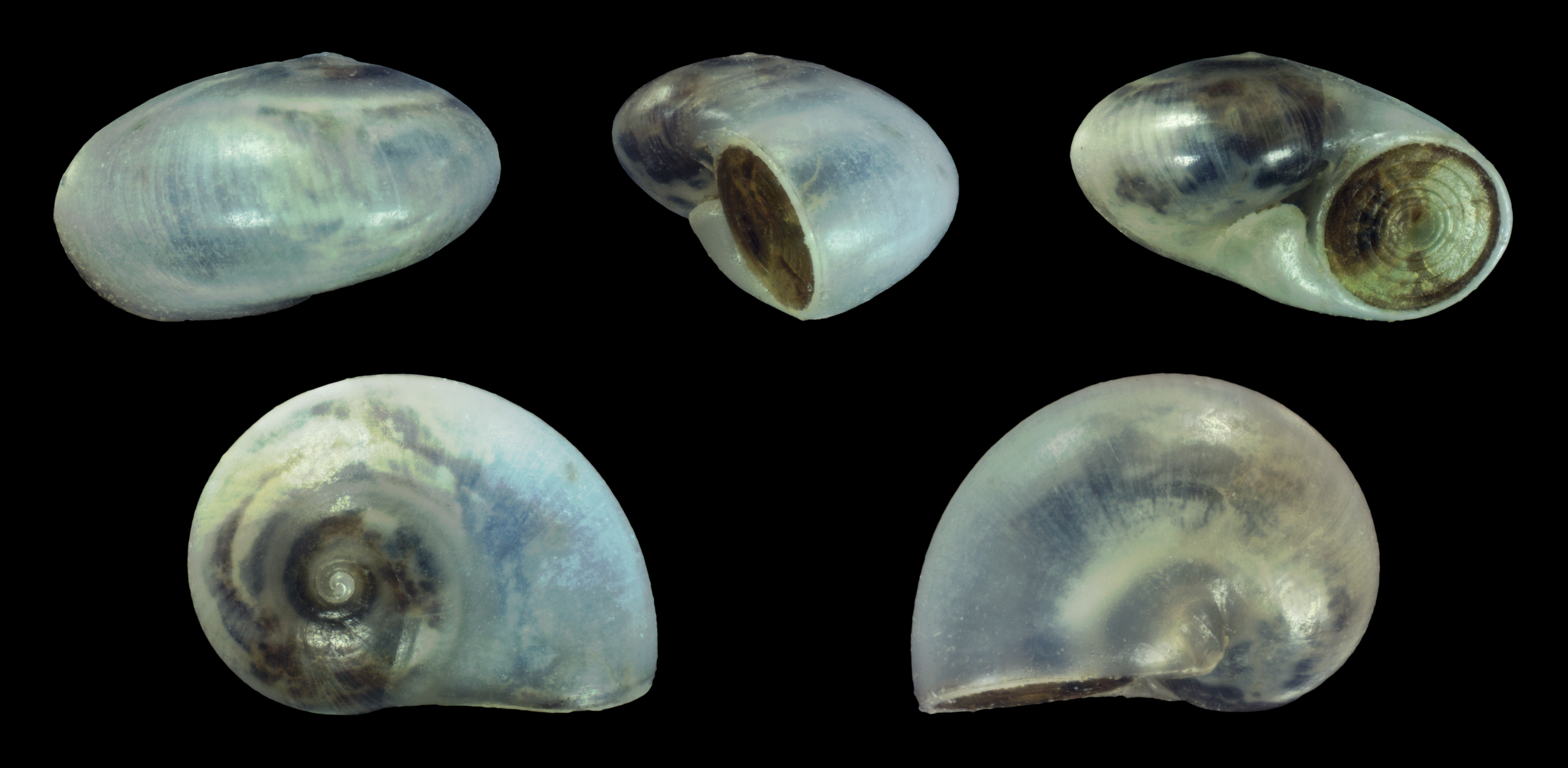
- A shell of Leucorhynchia crossei

Scientific classification
- Kingdom: Animalia
- Phylum: Mollusca
- Class: Gastropoda
- Subclass: Vetigastropoda
- Order: Trochida
- Family: Skeneidae
- Genus: Leucorhynchia
- Species: L. crossei

Binomial name
- Leucorhynchia crossei Tryon, 1888

Synonyms
- Teinostoma (Leucorhynchia) crossei Tryon, 1888

= Leucorhynchia crossei =

Species of gastropod

Leucorhynchia crossei is a species of sea snail, a marine gastropod mollusk in the family Skeneidae.

== Description ==
The diameter of the shell is 3 mm. It differs from the Leucorhynchia caledonica in having a rounded periphery. The surface is polished, without a trace of striae.

== Distribution ==
This marine species occurs in the Red Sea, the Gulf of Oman, Central and East Indian Ocean, Indo-Malaysia, Singapore, Western Australia and off Korea
