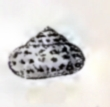
- Drawing of a shell of Umbonium sagittatum

Scientific classification
- Kingdom: Animalia
- Phylum: Mollusca
- Class: Gastropoda
- Subclass: Vetigastropoda
- Order: Trochida
- Superfamily: Trochoidea
- Family: Trochidae
- Genus: Umbonium
- Species: U. sagittatum

Binomial name
- Umbonium sagittatum (Hinds, 1845)

Synonyms
- Globulus articulatus Philippi; Globulus sagittatus Philippi; Rotella sagittata Hinds, 1845 (original description)

= Umbonium sagittatum =

Species of gastropod

Umbonium sagittatum is a species of very small sea snail, a marine gastropod mollusc or micromollusc in the family Trochidae, the top snails.

== Description ==
The height of the shell attains 4 mm, its diameter 6 mm. The shell is smaller and more depressed than is the case in Umbonium vestiarium. The color is fawn or flesh-colored, with a row of arrow-shaped dark spots at the periphery, and another row a short distance below the suture. The shell has about 4¼ whorls, which widen rapidly. The body whorl is depressed. The spire is lower than in Umbonium vestiarium. The basal callus is convex, circular, and smaller than in Umbonium vestiarium and it is either white or slate-colored. The surface of the shell is perfectly smooth and polished.

== Distribution ==
This marine species occurs in the Makassar Strait.
