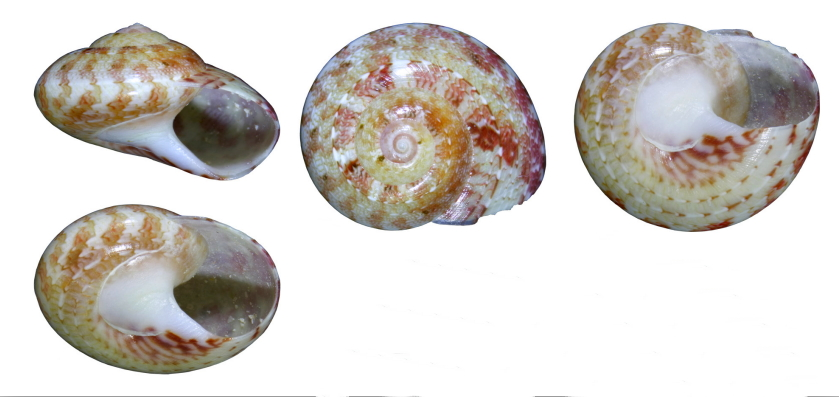
- Shell of Ethalia anomphala (holotype)

Scientific classification
- Kingdom: Animalia
- Phylum: Mollusca
- Class: Gastropoda
- Subclass: Vetigastropoda
- Order: Trochida
- Superfamily: Trochoidea
- Family: Trochidae
- Genus: Ethalia
- Species: E. anomphala

Binomial name
- Ethalia anomphala D. G. Herbert, 2024

= Ethalia anomphala =

Species of gastropod

Parminolia agapeta is a species of sea snail, a marine gastropod mollusk in the family Trochidae, the top snails.

== Description ==
The holotype reaches a height of 8.0 mm and a diameter of 12.2 mm, while the largest specimen attains a diameter of 13.5 mm.

(Original description) The shell is of moderate size, with a diameter of up to 13.5 mm, and is lenticular in shape (H/D 0.59–0.66). The teleoconch comprises up to 5.5 whorls. The surface is glossy throughout, except on the umbilical callus and columellar pillar. The periphery is rounded and lies close to mid‑whorl, with the suture level with or slightly above it. The base is anomphalous.

The first teleoconch whorl bears about three narrow spiral cords. These cords broaden during the second whorl, and additional intermediaries arise between them. By the start of the third whorl. The sculpture appears more like incised striae between low, broad cords. On subsequent whorls only widely spaced incised striae remain. Microscopic axial threads are present throughout, and on the last adult whorl more distinct, regularly spaced collabral growth lines become evident. The base shows fewer, more widely spaced incised striae, which become closer set toward the umbilical region, where the growth lines are also more conspicuous. The umbilicus is completely occluded by a large callus lobe that extends from the parietal lip.

The aperture is roundly quadrate, and the peristome is interrupted in the parietal region. The columellar lip is thickened and bears indistinct transverse ridges. The umbilical callus and columella are lustreless and have a microshagreened surface. The outer lip is simple, strongly prosocline above the periphery and orthocline below; its interior is smooth and nacreous in live‑collected specimens.

The shell is mottled or washed in shades of pale yellowish‑white, pale orange‑yellow, rose‑pink, deep pink, or crimson, and is marked with narrow capillary lines composed of alternating white and brownish dashes or chevron‑shaped marks. Greenish or brownish subsutural lines, spots, or blotches may also be present. The region bordering the umbilical callus behind the basal lip usually shows bold reddish radiating markings. The protoconch is white.

The protoconch is as in Ethalia montrouzieri, with a diameter of approximately 190 µm.

The operculum and radula are conform to those of Ethalia montrouzieri.

External anatomy (from rehydrated specimens): Only limited detail is visible. The inter‑tentacular region (forehead) is of moderate width. The snout is prominent and bears papillae subterminally. The cephalic tentacles are slender. The eyestalks are well developed, each being distally expanded and containing a large black eye. The left neck‑lobe is digitate, while the right neck‑lobe has an entire margin and is rolled to form an exhalant siphon. There are four micropapillate epipodial tentacles on each side, each with a white epipodial sense organ at its base, and an additional epipodial sense organ is present beneath each neck‑lobe. The sides of the foot and epipodium, particularly the metapodium, are densely pigmented in white to cream. The details of the ctenidial structure are unclear, but the anterior portion appears not to be attached.

== Distribution ==
This marine species occurs off New Caledonia and in the eastern Coral Sea.
