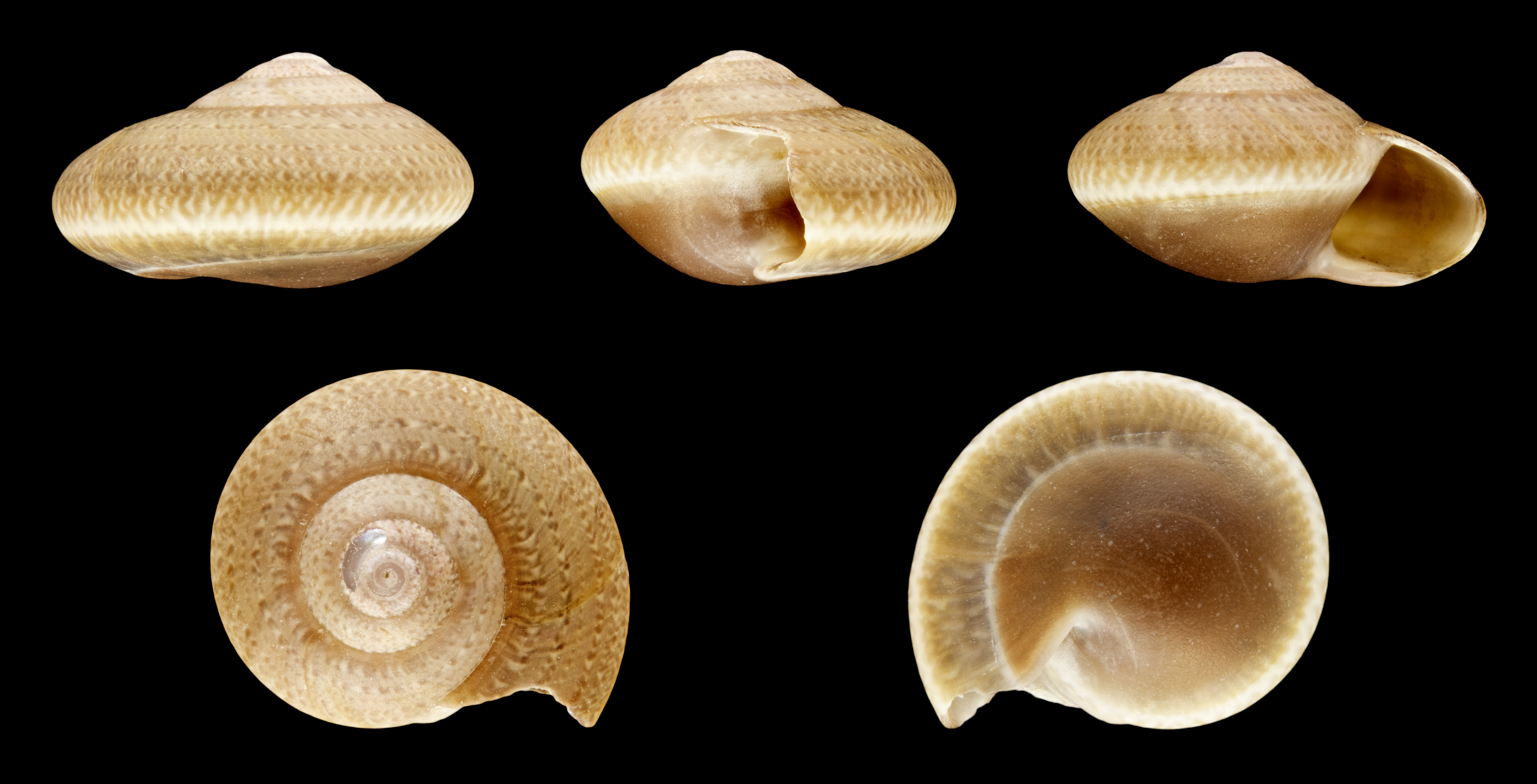

Scientific classification
- Kingdom: Animalia
- Phylum: Mollusca
- Class: Gastropoda
- Subclass: Vetigastropoda
- Order: Trochida
- Superfamily: Trochoidea
- Family: Trochidae
- Genus: Umbonium
- Species: U. elegans

Binomial name
- Umbonium elegans (Kiener, 1838)

Synonyms
- Rotella elegans Kiener, 1838

= Umbonium elegans =

Species of gastropod

Umbonium elegans is a species of sea snail, a marine gastropod mollusk in the family Trochidae, the top snails.

== Description ==
The size of the shell varies between 7 mm and 18 mm.

Due to any number of modifications and combinations of the color patterns of Umbonium vestiarium. Henry Pilsbry was unable to separate Umbonium elegans from Umbonium vestiarium, even varietally.

== Distribution ==
This marine species occurs in the Indo-West Pacific and off the Philippines.
