= Goryōgaidai Shell Mound =

- 五領ヶ台貝塚 (Japanese)
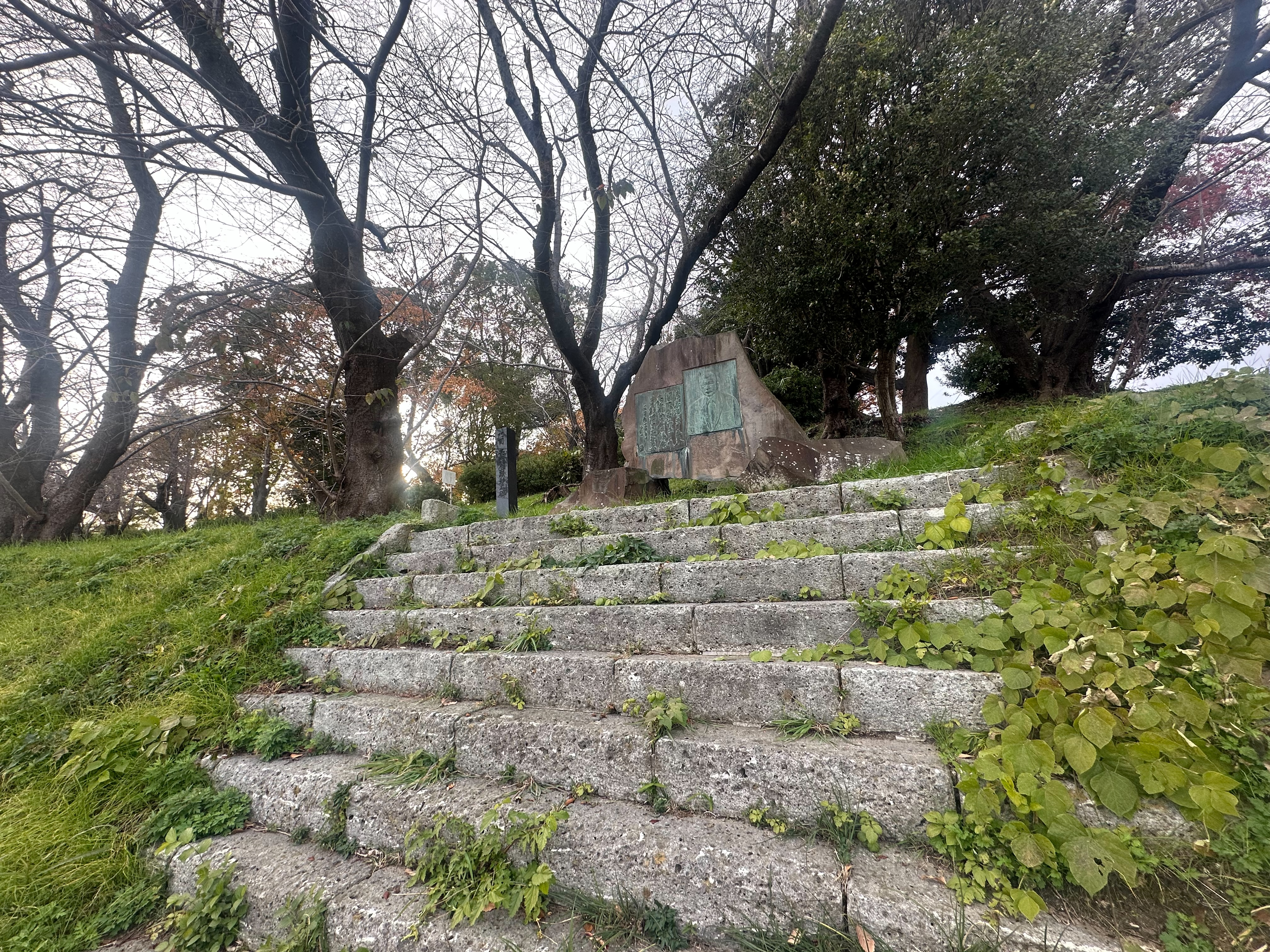

- Goryōgaidai Shell Mound Goryōgaidai Shell Mound (Japan)
- 35°21′16″N 139°18′02″E
- Type: shell midden
- Periods: Jōmon period
- Location: Hiratsuka, Kanagawa, Japan
- Region: Kantō region

Site notes
- Public access: Yes (park)

The Goryōgaidai Shell Mound (五領ヶ台貝塚, Goryōgaidai kaizuka) is an archaeological site in the Hirokawa neighborhood of the city of Hiratsuka, Kanagawa Prefecture, in the southern Kantō region of Japan containing a Jōmon period shell midden. It was designated a National Historic Site of Japan in 1972.

== Overview ==
During the early to middle Jōmon period (approximately 4000 to 2500 BC), sea levels were five to six meters higher than at present, and the ambient temperature was also 2 deg C higher. During this period, the Kantō region was inhabited by the Jōmon people, many of whom lived in coastal settlements. The middens associated with such settlements contain bone, botanical material, mollusc shells, sherds, lithics, and other artifacts and ecofacts associated with the now-vanished inhabitants, and these features, provide a useful source into the diets and habits of Jōmon society. Most of these middens are found along the Pacific coast of Japan.

The Goryōgaidai midden is located on a hill overlooking the alluvial plain of the Kaname River, a tributary of the Sagami River with an elevation of approximately 40 meters above the present sea level. While now considerably inland, it was located on the coast when sea levels were higher. The midden has a shell layer consisting almost exclusively of Umbonium giganteum shells, but also includes the bones of sea mammals such as dolphins and whales, fish including sea bream sea bass and sharks, land animals such as deer and wild boar. The midden also included a large number of Jōmon pottery fragments, including a distinctive pattern which has resulted in this midden being labelled as a type site for "Goryōgaidai pottery". The midden is relatively small and is divided into two locations on the eastern and western sides of the hill. The site was first excavated in 1925, and has been excavated repeatedly in the twentieth century. Since its designation as a National Historic Site in 1971 has become a city park. The excavated items are exhibited at the Hiratsuka City Museum.

The site is about three minutes by car from the Hiratsuka Interchange on the Odawara Atsugi Road.

== See also ==
- List of Historic Sites of Japan (Kanagawa)
