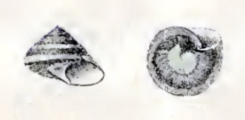
- Drawing with two views of a shell of Umbonium conicum

Scientific classification
- Kingdom: Animalia
- Phylum: Mollusca
- Class: Gastropoda
- Subclass: Vetigastropoda
- Order: Trochida
- Superfamily: Trochoidea
- Family: Trochidae
- Genus: Umbonium
- Species: U. conicum

Binomial name
- Umbonium conicum (A. Adams & Reeve, 1850)

Synonyms
- Rotella conica A. Adams & Reeve, 1850

= Umbonium conicum =

Species of gastropod

Umbonium conicum is a species of very small sea snail, a marine gastropod mollusk in the family Trochidae, the top snails.

== Description ==
The height of the shell attains 5 mm, its diameter 7 mm. The polished, smooth, thin but solid shell has a conic shape with a flat base. Its color pattern is dark purple, unicolored with a reddish apex, or with an opaque white band on the lower part of each whorl, or with the entire upper surface of the two outer whorls white, the base purple. The conical spire has straight lateral outlines. The six whorls are rather slowly widening. The body whorl is rounded at the periphery, flat below, or a trifle concave around the rather small, circular, dark central callus. The aperture is subquadrate and iridescent inside. The short columella is oblique, very thick and heavy, with a little nick in the edge near its base, and a slight notch where it is inserted upon the basal callus pad.

The coloration is peculiar; a beautiful iridescence glows through the purplish outer coat of the upper whorls. The conical form, flat base, and peculiarly nicked columella, together with the polished surface, smooth except for fine, impressed lines of increment, are diagnostic. Umbonium thomasi Crosse 1862, is larger and quite differently colored and sculptured.

== Distribution ==
This species occurs in the Sea of China and off Borneo and Sarawak, Malaysia.
