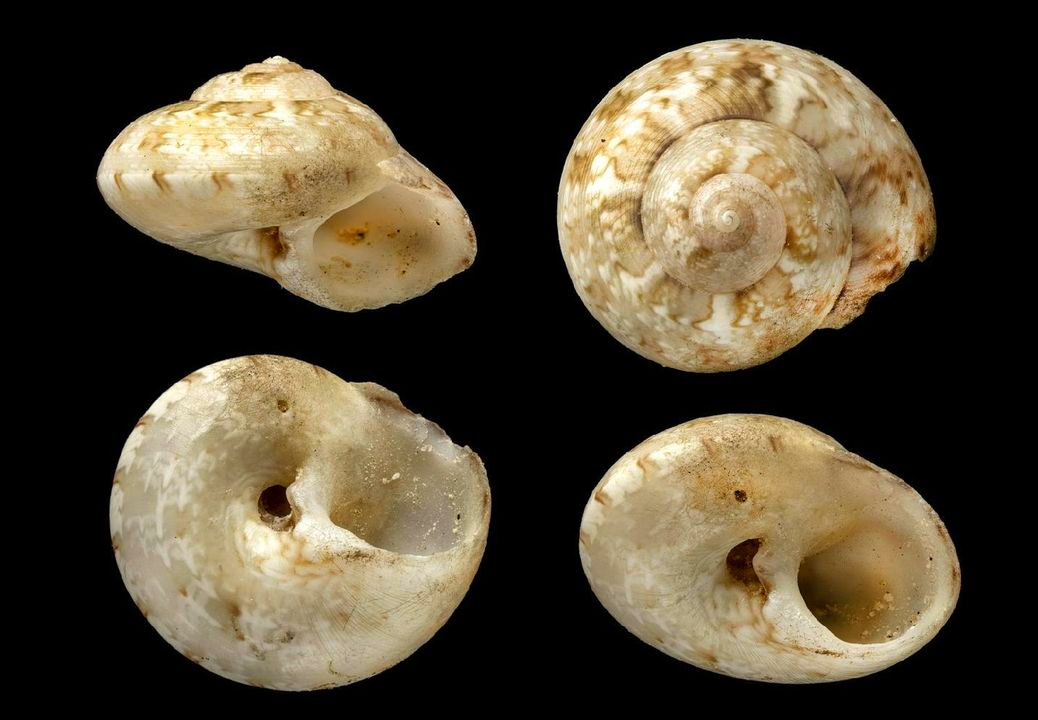
- Shell of Ethalia lampra (holotype at the Natural History Museum, London)

Scientific classification
- Kingdom: Animalia
- Phylum: Mollusca
- Class: Gastropoda
- Subclass: Vetigastropoda
- Order: Trochida
- Family: Trochidae
- Subfamily: Umboniinae
- Genus: Ethalia
- Species: E. lampra

Binomial name
- Ethalia lampra (R. B. Watson, 1880)

Synonyms
- Monilea (Minolia) lampra Pilsbry 1889; Trochus (Solariella) lamprus R. B. Watson, 1880 superseded combination

= Ethalia lampra =

Species of gastropod

Ethalia lampra is a species of sea snail, a marine gastropod mollusk in the family Trochidae, the top snails.

== Description ==
The shell is a relatively small, lenticular to globose-lenticular species, attaining a maximum diameter of 8.0 mm, with a somewhat variable H/D ratio (0.60–0.73). The shell is glossy, with weak overall sculpture. The periphery lies below the mid-whorl and is weakly angled, while the suture is shallowly channelled. The base is somewhat flattened, and the umbilicus is relatively narrow.

The second teleoconch whorl bears approximately six spiral lirae, of which the abapical lira is the strongest, forming a weak, shallowly undulant suprasutural cord. This cord gradually evanesces during the third whorl. Juveniles with two to three whorls exhibit a similarly weakly angled periphery delineated by the same suprasutural cord. On subsequent whorls, the sculpture appears to consist of incised spiral striae rather than raised lirae, although their spacing and prominence are variable. A microscopic thread-like axial sculpture is present throughout, accompanied by weak but regular collabral growth lines that become more evident on the body whorl. Most of the base is almost completely smooth except for the axial microsculpture, whereas the thickened peri-umbilical region bears microscopic spiral lirae interspersed with curved axial threads.

The umbilicus is open and relatively narrow, with a thickened rim and a broad internal funicle. The columellar lip is thickened and appears bilobed owing to an ear-like reflection at the termination of the umbilical funicle and a flattened pad at the end of the thickened umbilical rim. Both structures bear fine pustular microsculpture, while the flattened pad additionally exhibits indistinct transverse ridges.

The colour pattern is variable. The apical whorls are whitish with sparse flecks, whereas the later whorls are more heavily mottled with blotches and zig-zag markings in white and various shades of olive-green, brown, and brownish-grey. Fine spiral capillary lines composed of alternating white and darker chevron-like markings are also present. The periphery is marked by a white spiral band interrupted by darker markings, while the base displays a similar but fainter pattern. In some specimens, the predominant colouration consists of shades of pink rather than green, brown, or grey. A small dark maroon spot is commonly present on the upper portion of the reflected callus at the termination of the umbilical funicle.

The protoconch is as in Ethalia montrouzieri; diameter approximately 185 μm.

The operculum is as in Ethalia montrouzieri.

The external anatomy is as in Ethalia montrouzieri.

== Distribution ==
This marine species occurs off New Caledonia and Fiji.
