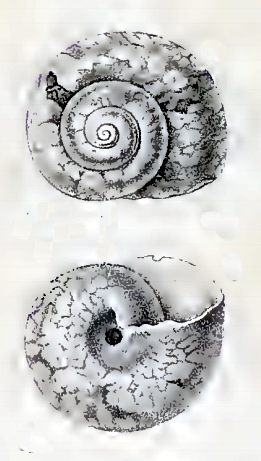
- Original drawing with two views of a shell of Ethalia minolina var. infralaevior

Scientific classification
- Kingdom: Animalia
- Phylum: Mollusca
- Class: Gastropoda
- Subclass: Vetigastropoda
- Order: Trochida
- Family: Trochidae
- Subfamily: Umboniinae
- Genus: Ethalia
- Species: E. minolina

Binomial name
- Ethalia minolina Melvill, 1897

= Ethalia minolina =

Species of gastropod

Ethalia minolina is a species of sea snail, a marine gastropod mollusk in the family Trochidae, the top snails.

The epithet minolina was given because of the resemblance with the genus Minolia.

M.M. Scheprman has described a variety Ethalia minolia var. infralaevior from Indonesian waters.

== Description ==
The height of the shell attains 6 mm, its diameter 10 mm. The pretty bright shell has a depressedly conical shape. It contains six whorls of rufous-flesh colour. They are uniformly very closely striate with threads with a pattern of banded filleting of white and fawn colour. The deep umbilicus is partly covered by the tongue-shaped callus extending from the columellar margin. The body whorl is at its periphery round-angulate. The operculum is corneous.
