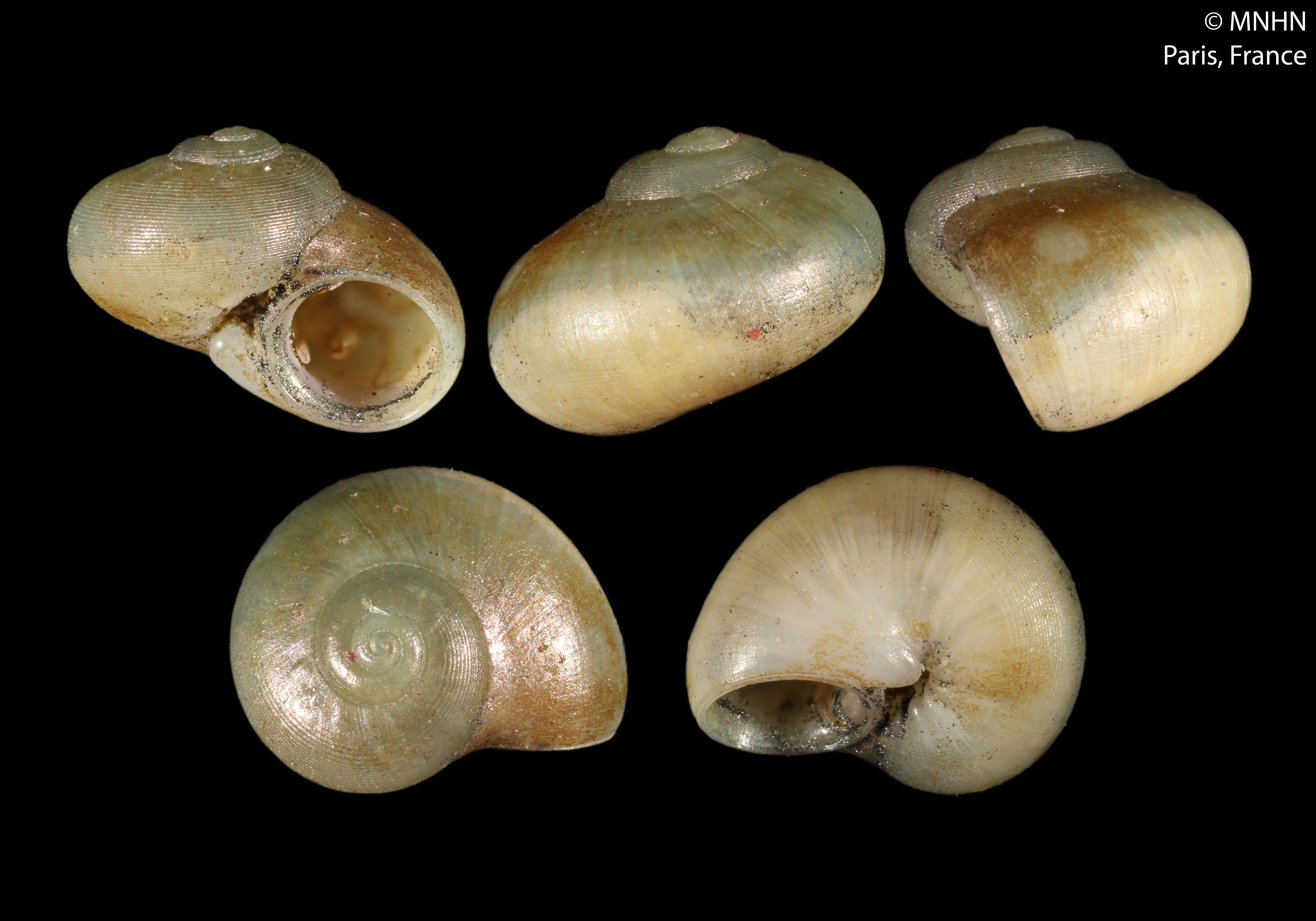
- Shells of Leucorhynchia minor (holotype at MNHN, Paris)

Scientific classification
- Kingdom: Animalia
- Phylum: Mollusca
- Class: Gastropoda
- Subclass: Vetigastropoda
- Order: Trochida
- Family: Skeneidae
- Genus: Leucorhynchia
- Species: L. minor

Binomial name
- Leucorhynchia minor Rolán & Gori, 2013

= Leucorhynchia minor =

Species of gastropod

Leucorhynchia minor is a species of sea snail, a marine gastropod mollusk in the family Skeneidae.

== Description ==
The length of the shell attains 2.55 mm.

== Distribution ==
This species occurs in the Atlantic Ocean off São Tomé Island.
