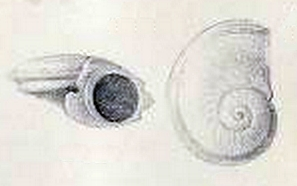
- Original drawing with two views of a shell of Leucorhynchia tricarinata

Scientific classification
- Kingdom: Animalia
- Phylum: Mollusca
- Class: Gastropoda
- Subclass: Vetigastropoda
- Order: Trochida
- Family: Skeneidae
- Genus: Leucorhynchia
- Species: L. tricarinata

Binomial name
- Leucorhynchia tricarinata Melvill & Standen, 1896

= Leucorhynchia tricarinata =

Species of gastropod

Leucorhynchia tricarinata is a species of sea snail, a marine gastropod mollusk in the family Skeneidae.

== Description ==
The size of the shell varies between 2 mm and 4 mm. The white shell is much depressed and contains three whorls. The apex has a papillary form and is sunk in the spire. The periphery is tricarinate with the middle keel strongly, squarely built and bold and projecting further from the whorl than the two other keels. The spiral crenellate run round the sutures and round the callosity of the peristome. This is tongue-shaped and conceals almost the umbilicus.

== Distribution ==
This marine species occurs in the intertidal and adjacent subtidal zones off Papua New Guinea, New Caledonia, Queensland, Australia, Tuvalu, the Loyalty Islands and the Philippines.
