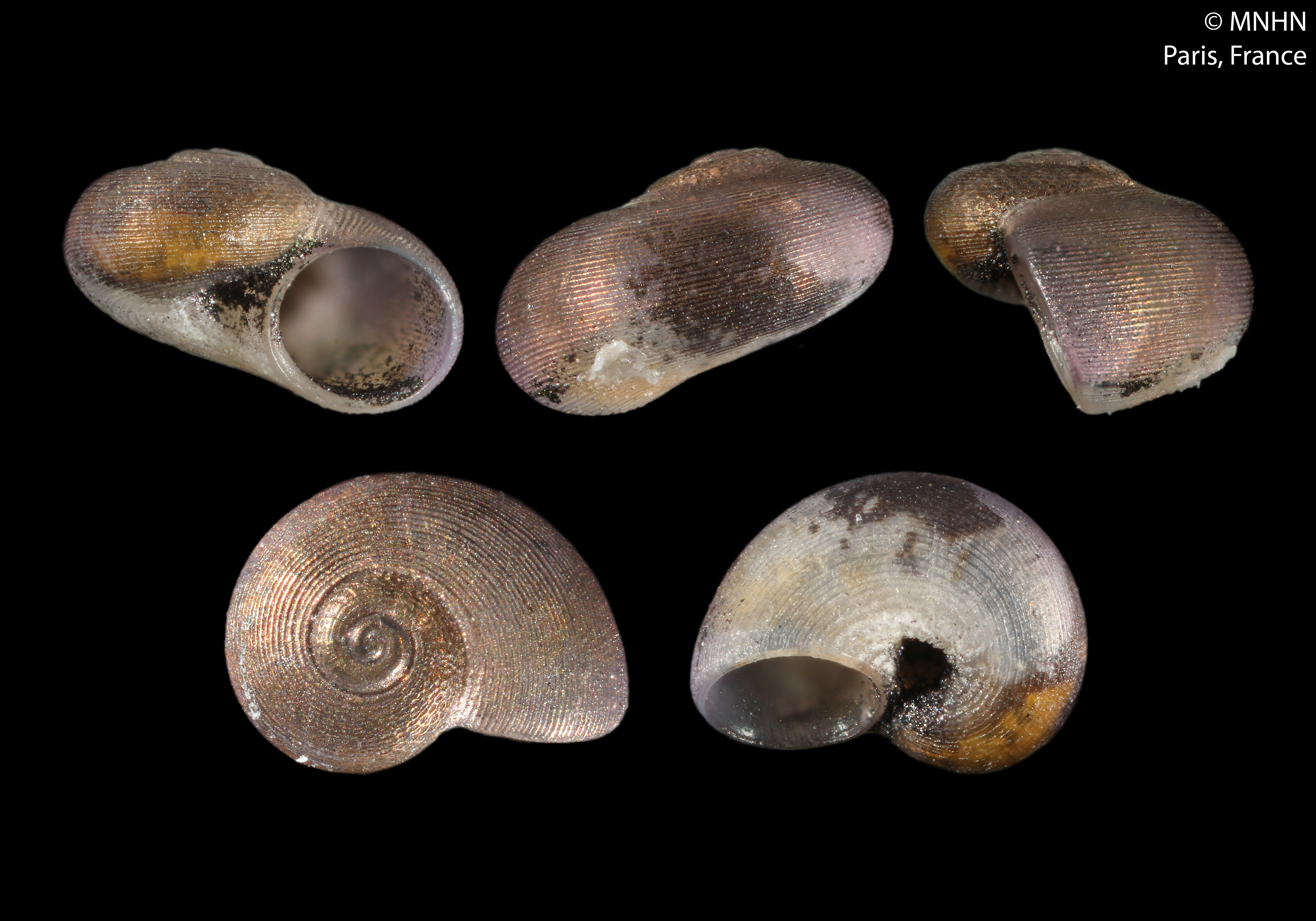
- Shells of Leucorhynchia gorii (holotype at MNHN, Paris)

Scientific classification
- Kingdom: Animalia
- Phylum: Mollusca
- Class: Gastropoda
- Subclass: Vetigastropoda
- Order: Trochida
- Family: Skeneidae
- Genus: Leucorhynchia
- Species: L. gorii

Binomial name
- Leucorhynchia gorii Rolán & Rubio, 2012

= Leucorhynchia gorii =

Species of sea snail

Leucorhynchia gorii is a species of sea snail, a marine gastropod mollusk in the family Skeneidae. Leucorhynchia is a genus of snails in the family Skeneidae.

== Description ==
The length of the shell attains 1.5 mm.

== Distribution ==
This marine species occurs off West Africa and off São Tomé and Principe.
