= Leucorhynchia bicarinata =

Scientific classification
- Kingdom: Animalia
- Phylum: Mollusca
- Class: Gastropoda
- Subclass: Vetigastropoda
- Order: Trochida
- Family: Skeneidae
- Genus: Leucorhynchia
- Species: L. bicarinata

Binomial name
- Leucorhynchia bicarinata Adam & Knudsen, 1969

Synonyms
- Tinostoma lirata Dautzenberg, 1912 (non Smith, 1871)

Species of gastropod

Leucorhynchia bicarinata is a species of sea snail, a marine gastropod mollusk in the family Skeneidae.
