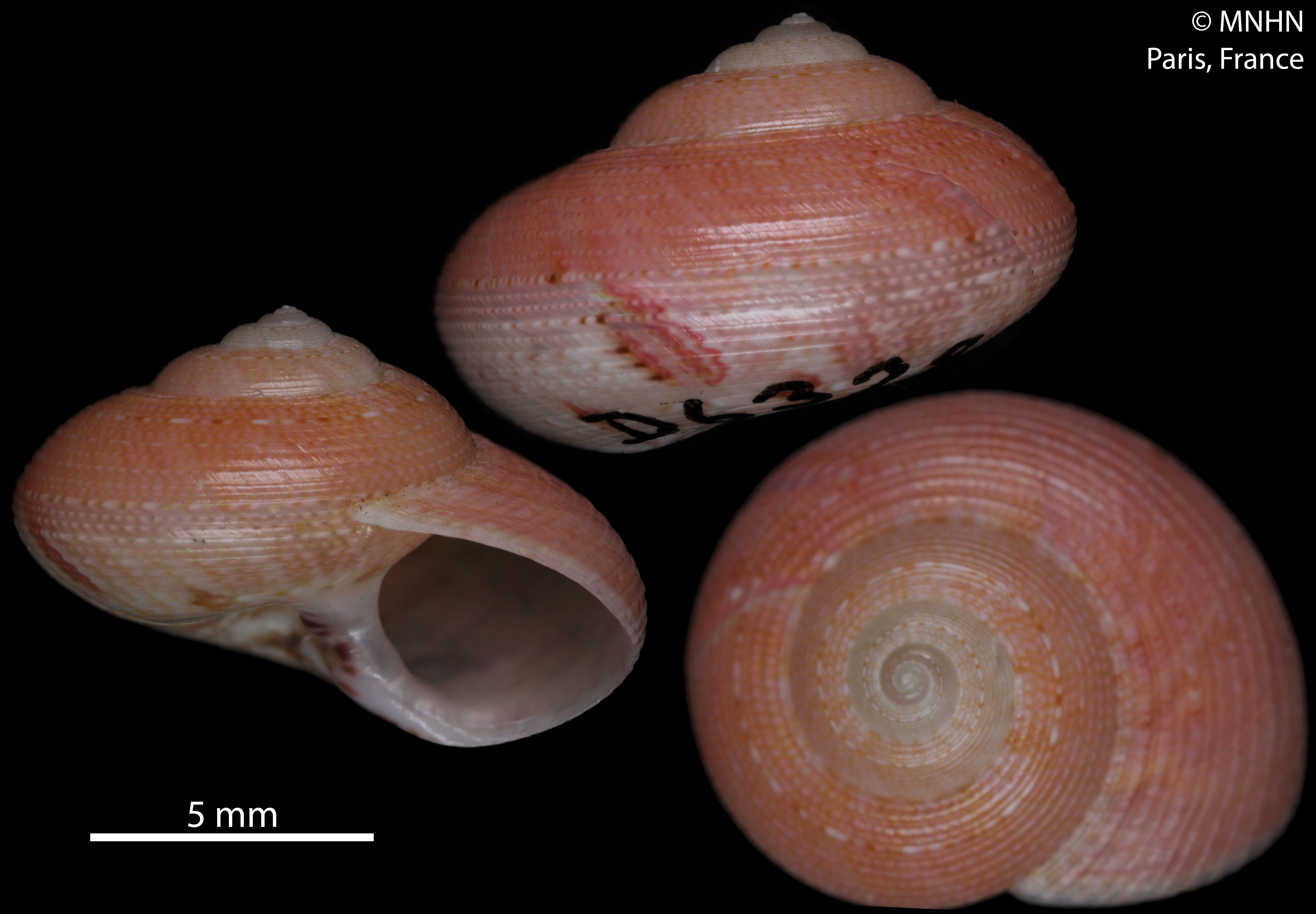
- Shell of Ethalia gilchristae (paratype at MNHN, Paris)

Scientific classification
- Kingdom: Animalia
- Phylum: Mollusca
- Class: Gastropoda
- Subclass: Vetigastropoda
- Order: Trochida
- Superfamily: Trochoidea
- Family: Trochidae
- Genus: Ethalia
- Species: E. gilchristae

Binomial name
- Ethalia gilchristae Herbert, 1992

= Ethalia gilchristae =

Species of gastropod

Ethalia gilchristae is a species of sea snail, a marine gastropod mollusk in the family Trochidae, the top snails.

== Distribution ==
This marine species occurs off South Africa.
