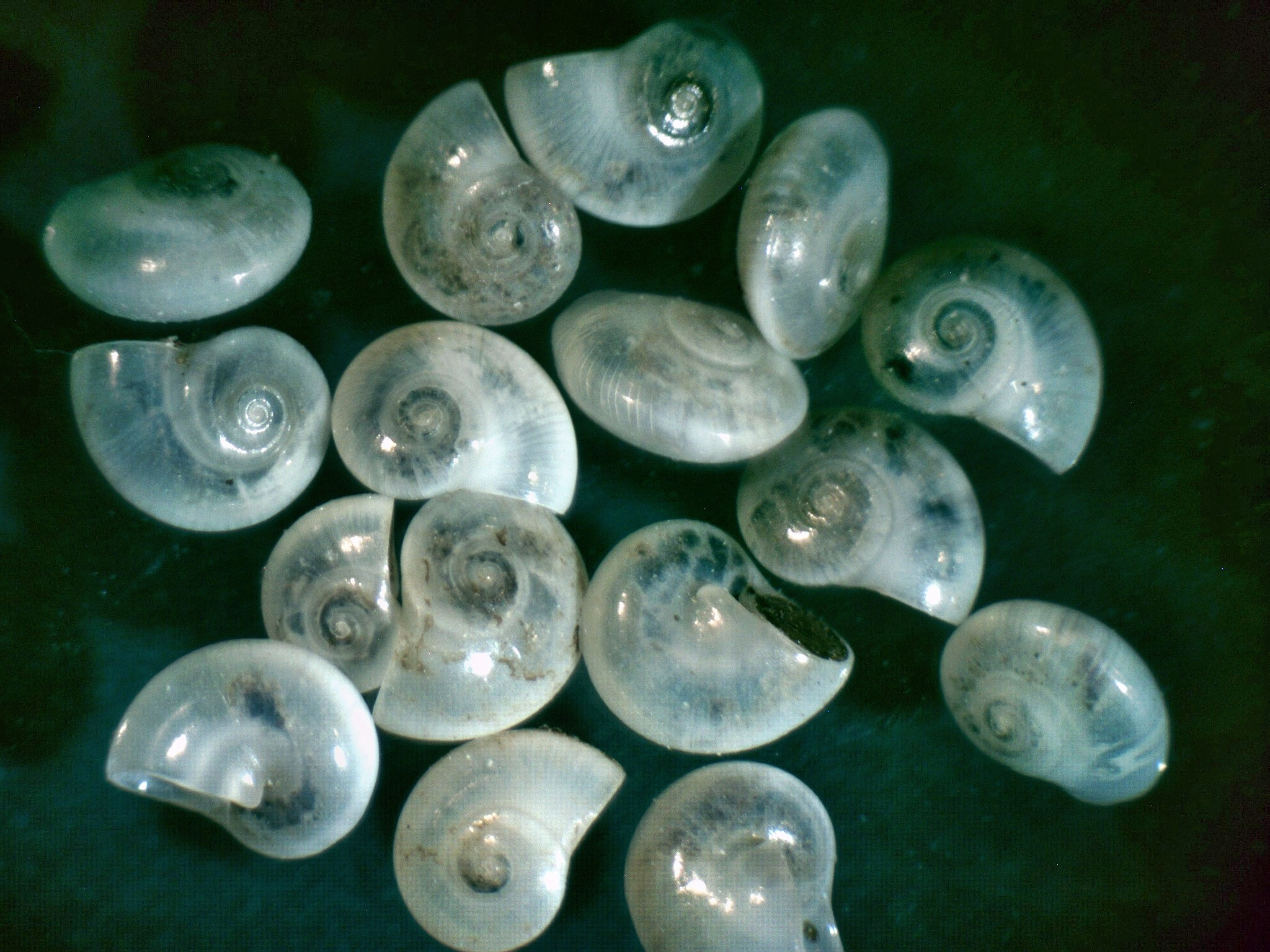

Scientific classification
- Kingdom: Animalia
- Phylum: Mollusca
- Class: Gastropoda
- Subclass: Vetigastropoda
- Order: Trochida
- Family: Skeneidae
- Genus: Leucorhynchia; Crosse, 1867

Type species
- Leucorhynchia caledonica Crosse, 1867

Synonyms
- Teinostoma (Leucorhynchia) Crosse, 1867; Vitrinella (Leucorhynchia) Crosse, 1867

= Leucorhynchia =

Genus of gastropods

Leucorhynchia is a genus of very small sea snails, marine gastropod mollusks in the family Skeneidae.

== Distribution ==
This marine species occurs off the Gulf of Oman, Singapore, Indo-Malaysia, Central and East Indian Ocean, Papua New Guinea, New Caledonia, Tuvalu, Western Pacific Ocean, Queensland, Australia, and Western Africa.

== Species ==
Species within the genus Leucorhynchia include:

- Leucorhynchia amoena (Thiele, 1925)
- Leucorhynchia arctusulculus Rubio & Rolán, 2019
- Leucorhynchia asessa Rubio, Rolán & Gori, 2019
- Leucorhynchia australis Rubio, Rolán & Gori, 2019
- Leucorhynchia barreiroi Rubio & Rolán, 2019
- Leucorhynchia basiscostae Rubio, Rolán & Gori, 2019
- Leucorhynchia bicarinata Adam & Knudsen, 1969
- Leucorhynchia bilinguae Rubio & Rolán, 2019
- Leucorhynchia caledonica Crosse, 1867
- Leucorhynchia candida (A. Adams, 1862)
- Leucorhynchia carbegtel Rubio, Rolán & Gori, 2019
- Leucorhynchia carigracilis Rubio, Rolán & Gori, 2019
- Leucorhynchia carinampla Rubio, Rolán & Gori, 2019
- Leucorhynchia catenata Rubio & Rolán, 2019
- Leucorhynchia celata Rubio & Rolán, 2019
- Leucorhynchia colurible Rubio, Rolán & Gori, 2019
- Leucorhynchia confortinii Rubio, Rolán & Gori, 2019
- Leucorhynchia crinita Rubio, Rolán & Gori, 2019
- Leucorhynchia crossei Tryon, 1888
- Leucorhynchia depressa Rubio & Rolán, 2019
- Leucorhynchia distorta Rubio, Rolán & Gori, 2019
- Leucorhynchia fecitae Rubio, Rolán & Gori, 2019
- Leucorhynchia fereglabra Rubio, Rolán & Gori, 2019
- Leucorhynchia funiculata Rubio & Rolán, 2019
- Leucorhynchia garciarodejai Rubio & Rolán, 2019
- Leucorhynchia glabra Rubio & Rolán, 2019
- Leucorhynchia globosa Rubio & Rolán, 2019
- Leucorhynchia gorii Rolán & Rubio, 2012
- Leucorhynchia haesitans Rubio & Rolán, 2019
- Leucorhynchia impolita Rubio & Rolán, 2019
- Leucorhynchia iterata Rubio & Rolán, 2019
- Leucorhynchia letourneuxi Rubio & Rolán, 2019
- Leucorhynchia levinicium Rubio, Rolán & Gori, 2019
- Leucorhynchia levis Rubio & Rolán, 2019
- Leucorhynchia lingula Rubio & Rolán, 2019
- Leucorhynchia lirata (E.A. Smith, 1871)
- Leucorhynchia lluviae Rubio & Rolán, 2019
- Leucorhynchia magnucleus Rubio & Rolán, 2019
- Leucorhynchia marcosi Rubio & Rolán, 2019
- Leucorhynchia microstriata Rubio & Rolán, 2019
- Leucorhynchia microtuberculata Rubio & Rolán, 2019
- Leucorhynchia minor Rolán & Gori, 2013
- Leucorhynchia monteiroi Rubio, Rolán & Gori, 2019
- Leucorhynchia multistriata Rubio & Rolán, 2019
- Leucorhynchia nitida Briart & Cornet, 1887 †
- Leucorhynchia omanensis (Thiele, 1925)
- Leucorhynchia operta Rubio & Rolán, 2019
- Leucorhynchia ornatissima (Thiele, 1925)
- Leucorhynchia osaculeatum Rubio & Rolán, 2019
- Leucorhynchia osmagnum Rubio, Rolán & Gori, 2019
- Leucorhynchia papuaensis Rubio & Rolán, 2019
- Leucorhynchia parvicostae Rubio, Rolán & Gori, 2019
- Leucorhynchia paucistriata Rubio & Rolán, 2019
- Leucorhynchia peculiaris Rubio & Rolán, 2019
- Leucorhynchia perinde Rubio & Rolán, 2019
- Leucorhynchia perpolita Rubio & Rolán, 2019
- Leucorhynchia persculpturata Rubio & Rolán, 2019
- Leucorhynchia philippinensis Rubio & Rolán, 2019
- Leucorhynchia plena Rubio & Rolán, 2019
- Leucorhynchia plicata (E. A. Smith, 1872)
- Leucorhynchia plicifera (Thiele, 1925)
- Leucorhynchia plurilicium Rubio, Rolán & Gori, 2019
- Leucorhynchia poteli Rubio & Rolán, 2019
- Leucorhynchia prominens Rubio & Rolán, 2019
- Leucorhynchia punctata (Jousseaume, 1872)
- Leucorhynchia radiata Rubio & Rolán, 2019
- Leucorhynchia raquelae Rubio & Rolán, 2019
- Leucorhynchia redita Rubio & Rolán, 2019
- Leucorhynchia reunionensis Rubio & Rolán, 2019
- Leucorhynchia robusta Rubio, Rolán & Gori, 2019
- Leucorhynchia rosinaeRubio & Rolán, 2019
- Leucorhynchia rotata (Hedley, 1899)
- Leucorhynchia rotellaeformis (Grateloup, 1832) †
- Leucorhynchia rotulina Darragh & Kendrick, 2000 †
- Leucorhynchia ryalli Rubio, Rolán & Gori, 2019
- Leucorhynchia salisburyi Rubio, Rolán & Gori, 2019
- Leucorhynchia sandrogorii Rubio & Rolán, 2019
- Leucorhynchia sculpturata Rubio & Rolán, 2019
- Leucorhynchia seminiformis Rubio & Rolán, 2019
- Leucorhynchia stellata Rubio, Rolán & Gori, 2019
- Leucorhynchia stephensoni Ladd, 1966 †
- Leucorhynchia striatissima Rubio, Rolán & Gori, 2019
- Leucorhynchia sulciobliqui Rubio & Rolán, 2019
- Leucorhynchia sulinitel Rubio & Rolán, 2019
- Leucorhynchia thailandensis Rubio, Rolán & Gori, 2019
- Leucorhynchia torta Rubio & Rolán, 2019
- Leucorhynchia tricarinata Melvill & Standen, 1896
- Leucorhynchia tryoni Pilsbry, 1891
- Leucorhynchia umbilicord Rubio & Rolán, 2019
- Leucorhynchia umbilifuni Rubio & Rolán, 2019
- Leucorhynchia undulans Rubio & Rolán, 2019
- Leucorhynchia valida Rubio & Rolán, 2019
- Leucorhynchia ventricosa Darragh & Kendrick, 2000 †
- Leucorhynchia zboroviensis Friedberg, 1928 †
