= Ethalia carneolata =

Scientific classification
- Kingdom: Animalia
- Phylum: Mollusca
- Class: Gastropoda
- Subclass: Vetigastropoda
- Order: Trochida
- Superfamily: Trochoidea
- Family: Trochidae
- Genus: Ethalia
- Species: E. carneolata

Binomial name
- Ethalia carneolata Melvill, 1897

Synonyms
- Ethalia carneolata var. rubrostrigata Melvill, 1904; Ethalia striolata Kilburn, 1977; Rotella carneolata (Melvill, 1897)

Species of gastropod

Ethalia carneolata is a species of sea snail, a marine gastropod mollusk in the family Trochidae, the top snails.

== Description ==
The height of the shell attains 4 mm, its diameter 7 mm. The smooth, little shell has a depressedly conical shape. It has a profound but narrow umbilicus. The shell contains 5 to 6 whorls that increase rapidly in size. They are separated by impressed sutures. The apex is minute. The body whorl is obtuse-angulate at the periphery. The aperture is round. The columellar margin contains a callus. The colour of the shell is a pale carnation or flesh-colour in hue. Inside the aperture there is a deeper shade of the same colour, painted with fillets spirally or ochre-brown beaded with white.

== Distribution ==
This marine species occurs off Mozambique and South Africa. It has also been reported in the Gulf of Oman. and off Sri Lanka.
