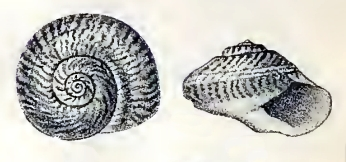
- Drawing of two views of a shell of Umbonium suturale

Scientific classification
- Kingdom: Animalia
- Phylum: Mollusca
- Class: Gastropoda
- Subclass: Vetigastropoda
- Order: Trochida
- Superfamily: Trochoidea
- Family: Trochidae
- Genus: Umbonium
- Species: U. suturale

Binomial name
- Umbonium suturale (Lamarck, 1822)

Synonyms
- Rotella suturalis Lamarck, 1822 (original combination); Umbonium (Suchium) suturale (Lamarck, 1822)

= Umbonium suturale =

Species of gastropod

Umbonium suturale is a species of sea snail, a marine gastropod mollusk in the family Trochidae, the top snails.

== Description ==
The height of the shell attains 12 mm, its diameter 19 mm. The strong and solid shell has a depressed shape with a low-conoidal spire. The upper and lower surfaces are nearly equally convex. The color pattern is whitish or pinkish, with numerous, close, oblique, zigzag, radiating purplish-brown lines extending to the purple or crimson basal callus. The surface of the shell is polished, shining, with a few shallow spiral sulci on the upper surface, generally not more than 4, frequently obsolete. The shell contains about six whorls, each with a prominent, convex margin bordering the deeply impressed suture, below this margin concave. The body whorl is rounded at the periphery and convex beneath. The aperture is subquadrate. The basal callus is irregularly convex, with two lumps or prominences, one behind the columellar lip.

== Distribution ==
This marine species occurs in the Indo-Pacific Ocean.
