= Umbonium eloiseae =

Scientific classification
- Kingdom: Animalia
- Phylum: Mollusca
- Class: Gastropoda
- Subclass: Vetigastropoda
- Order: Trochida
- Superfamily: Trochoidea
- Family: Trochidae
- Genus: Umbonium
- Species: U. eloiseae

Binomial name
- Umbonium eloiseae Dance, Moolenbeek & Dekker, 1992

Species of gastropod

Umbonium eloiseae is a species of sea snail, a marine gastropod mollusk in the family Trochidae, the top snails.

== Description ==
The size of the shell varies between 7 mm and 20 mm.

== Distribution ==
This marine species occurs in the Gulf of Oman.
