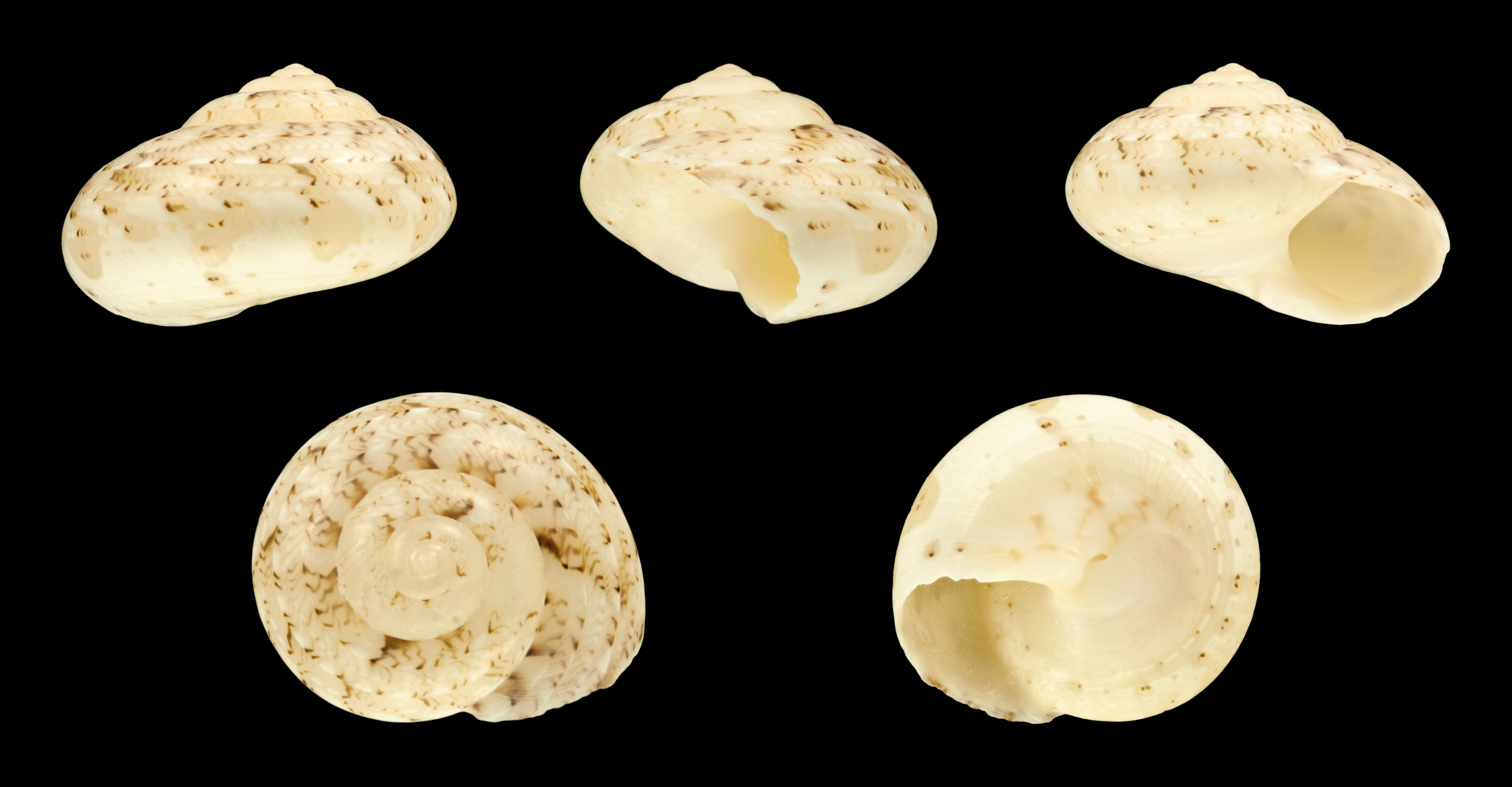

Scientific classification
- Kingdom: Animalia
- Phylum: Mollusca
- Class: Gastropoda
- Subclass: Vetigastropoda
- Order: Trochida
- Family: Trochidae
- Subfamily: Umboniinae
- Genus: Ethalia
- Species: E. catharinae

Binomial name
- Ethalia catharinae Poppe, Tagaro & Dekker, 2006

= Ethalia catharinae =

Species of gastropod

Ethalia catharinae is a species of sea snail, a marine gastropod mollusk in the family Trochidae, the top snails.

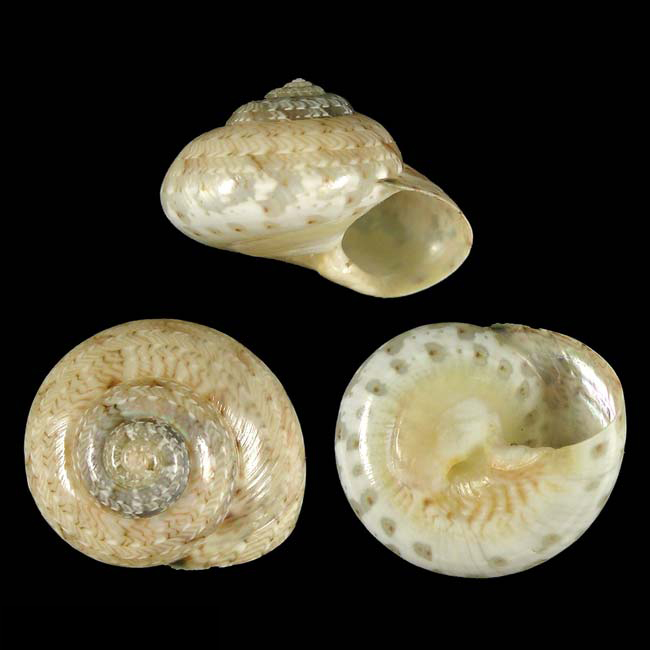
Seashell Ethalia catharinae

== Description ==
The size of the shell attains 16 mm.

== Distribution ==
This marine species occurs off the Philippines.
