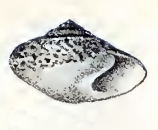
- Drawing of a shell of Umbonium callosum

Scientific classification
- Kingdom: Animalia
- Phylum: Mollusca
- Class: Gastropoda
- Subclass: Vetigastropoda
- Order: Trochida
- Superfamily: Trochoidea
- Family: Trochidae
- Genus: Umbonium
- Species: U. callosum

Binomial name
- Umbonium callosum (Sowerby, 1887)

Synonyms
- Rotella callosa Sowerby, 1887

= Umbonium callosum =

Species of gastropod

Umbonium callosum is a species of small sea snail, a marine gastropod mollusk in the family Trochidae, the top snails.

== Description ==
The height of the shell attains 8 mm, its diameter 13 mm. The solid shell has a depressed shape. Its outer lip is thin. The color pattern is white or yellowish, finely marbled all over with black, gray or ashen, sometimes with a series of white blotches at the periphery. The basal callus is white, yellow, reddish or black. The smooth surface is polished. The low spire is conical and acute. The 6 to 7 whorls are slightly convex. They are separated by simple, linear sutures. The body whorl widens very rapidly. It is large, dilated, flat on the base, except for the large circular callus, which is excessively heavy and convex. The aperture is oval-truncate.

The last whorl is very wide, and the umbilical callus far heavier, more convex, than in any other known species of this genus.

== Distribution ==
This species occurs in the Indian Ocean.
