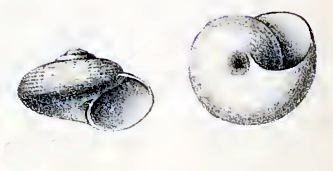
- Drawing of a shell of Ethalia bellardii

Scientific classification
- Kingdom: Animalia
- Phylum: Mollusca
- Class: Gastropoda
- Subclass: Vetigastropoda
- Order: Trochida
- Superfamily: Trochoidea
- Family: Trochidae
- Genus: Ethalia
- Species: E. bellardii

Binomial name
- Ethalia bellardii (Issel, 1869)

Synonyms
- Trochus bellardii Issel, 1869 (original combination); Monilea bellardii Issel, 1869

= Ethalia bellardii =

Species of gastropod

Ethalia bellardii is a species of sea snail with a top-shaped shell, a marine gastropod mollusk in the family Trochidae, the top snails.

== Description ==
The minute, thin shell has a height of only 2 mm. Its shape is orbicular-depressed, oblique, narrowly umbilicate, transversely minutely costulate. It has a pale rose-color, tessellated with purple. The spire is obtuse. The 4½ whorls are rapidly widening, slightly convex, and planulate at the sutures. They are separated by impressed sutures. The body whorl is large and rounded on the base. The aperture is dilated, ovate-trigonal. The peristome is simple and acute.

== Distribution ==
This species occurs in the Red Sea off Suez.
