= Ethalia bysma =

Scientific classification
- Kingdom: Animalia
- Phylum: Mollusca
- Class: Gastropoda
- Subclass: Vetigastropoda
- Order: Trochida
- Superfamily: Trochoidea
- Family: Trochidae
- Genus: Ethalia
- Species: E. bysma

Binomial name
- Ethalia bysma Herbert, 1992

Synonyms
- Ethminolia bysma (Herbert, 1992)

Species of gastropod

Ethalia bysma is a species of sea snail, a marine gastropod mollusk in the family Trochidae, the top snails.

== Distribution ==
This marine species occurs off South Africa.
