= Leucorhynchia tryoni =

Scientific classification
- Kingdom: Animalia
- Phylum: Mollusca
- Class: Gastropoda
- Subclass: Vetigastropoda
- Order: Trochida
- Family: Skeneidae
- Genus: Leucorhynchia
- Species: L. tryoni

Binomial name
- Leucorhynchia tryoni Pilsbry, 1891

Synonyms
- Teinostoma (Leucorhynchia) tryoni Pilsbry, 1891 (basionym)

Species of gastropod

Leucorhynchia tryoni is a species of sea snail, a marine gastropod mollusk in the family Skeneidae.

== Distribution ==
This marine species occurs off Singapore.
