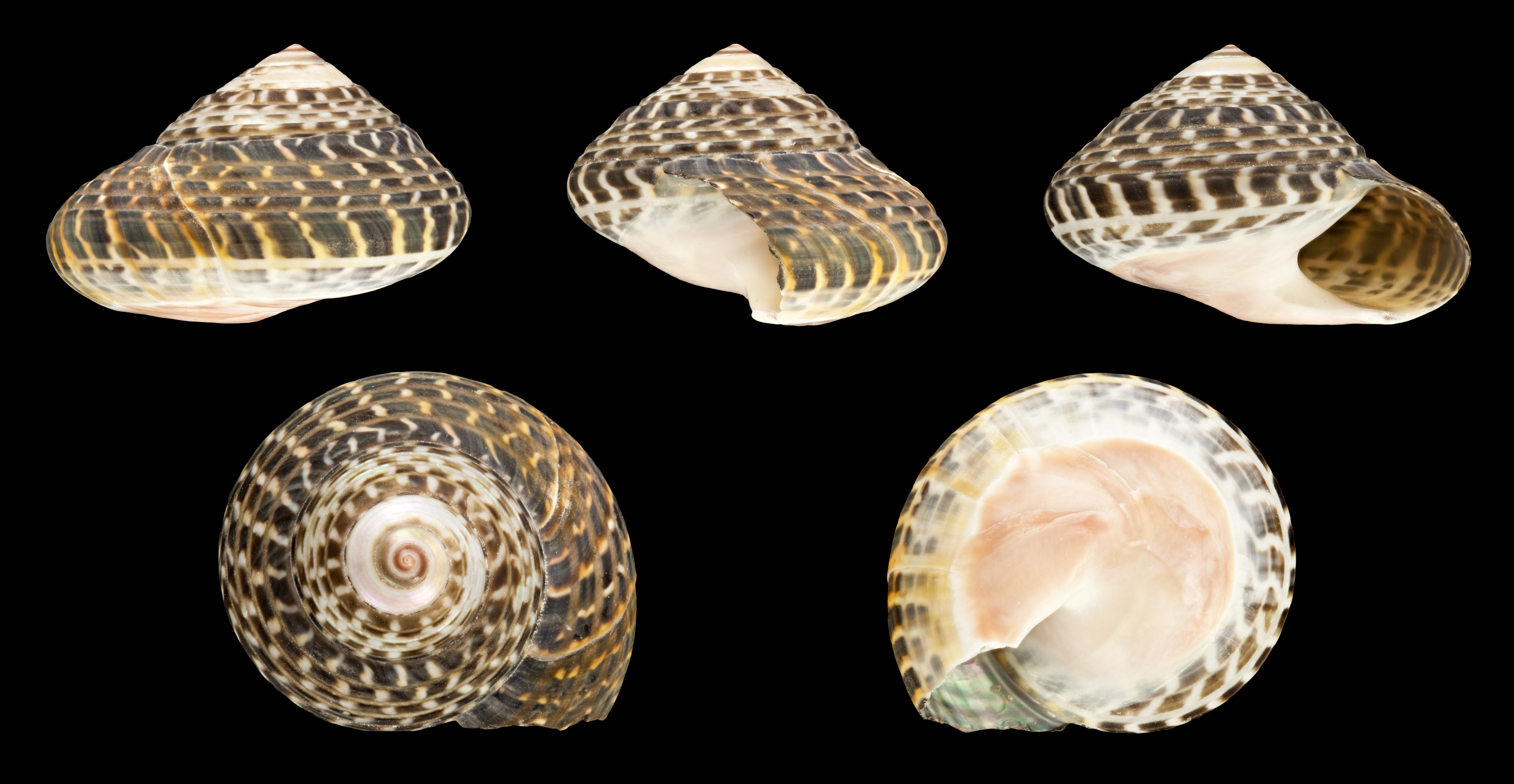

Scientific classification
- Kingdom: Animalia
- Phylum: Mollusca
- Class: Gastropoda
- Subclass: Vetigastropoda
- Order: Trochida
- Superfamily: Trochoidea
- Family: Trochidae
- Genus: Umbonium
- Species: U. moniliferum

Binomial name
- Umbonium moniliferum (Lamarck, 1822)

Synonyms
- Globulus moniliferus Philippi; Rotella javanica Lamarck, 1822; Rotella monilifera (Lamarck, 1822) (original combination); Umbonium javanicum A. Adams, 1853; Umbonium (Suchium) moniliferum (Lamarck, 1822)

= Umbonium moniliferum =

Species of gastropod

Umbonium moniliferum is a species of sea snail, a marine gastropod mollusk in the family Trochidae, the top snails.

== Description ==
The size of the shell varies between 10 mm and 20 mm. The solid shell is depressed with a very low, conoidal spire. Its color pattern is yellow, pinkish or whitish, closely tessellated with purple-brown or bluish slate-color, the basal callus purplish flesh-colored. Its surface is shining, polished, with spiral sulci above, generally 3–5 in number on the body whorl, often subobsolete. The suture is sometimes margined by a row of prominent tubercles, 8 to 11 on the body whorl. The shell contains about six whorls, the last rounded at the periphery, convex beneath. The callus is quite heavy, convex and circular.

== Distribution ==
This marine species occurs off Japan and South Korea.
