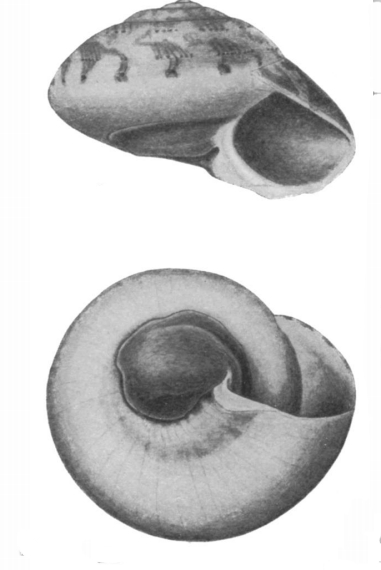
- Original image with two views of a shell of Ethalia sanguinea

Scientific classification
- Kingdom: Animalia
- Phylum: Mollusca
- Class: Gastropoda
- Subclass: Vetigastropoda
- Order: Trochida
- Superfamily: Trochoidea
- Family: Trochidae
- Genus: Ethalia
- Species: E. sanguinea

Binomial name
- Ethalia sanguinea (Pilsbry, 1905)

Synonyms
- Ethalia guamensis sanguinea (-Pilsbry, H.A., 1905(original description); Trochus callosus Koch in Philippi, 1844 (invalid: junior homonym of Trochus callosus Gmelin, 1791); Umbonium sanguinea (H. A. Pilsbry, 1905)

= Ethalia sanguinea =

Species of gastropod

Ethalia sanguinea is a species of sea snail, a marine gastropod mollusk in the family Trochidae, the top-snails.

== Description ==
A typical shell has a height of 10 mm and a diameter of 15 mm. The imperforate shell has a low-conoidal shape above, but is convex beneath. It is glossy and smooth except for fine growth lines and almost obsolete spirals. Its color is white, copiously marbled with purple-brown and pinkish above, with some opaque white spots, and a few indistinct articulated spiral lines. The base is white, with a pink central area. The 5½ whorls are convex. The body whorl is wide and narrowly rounded at the periphery. The ovate aperture is oblique. The lip is thin and simple, callused near the columellar insertion. The umbilicus is wholly filled by a red callous pad, roughened by several irregular vein-like grooves.

== Distribution ==
This marine species occurs off Japan.
