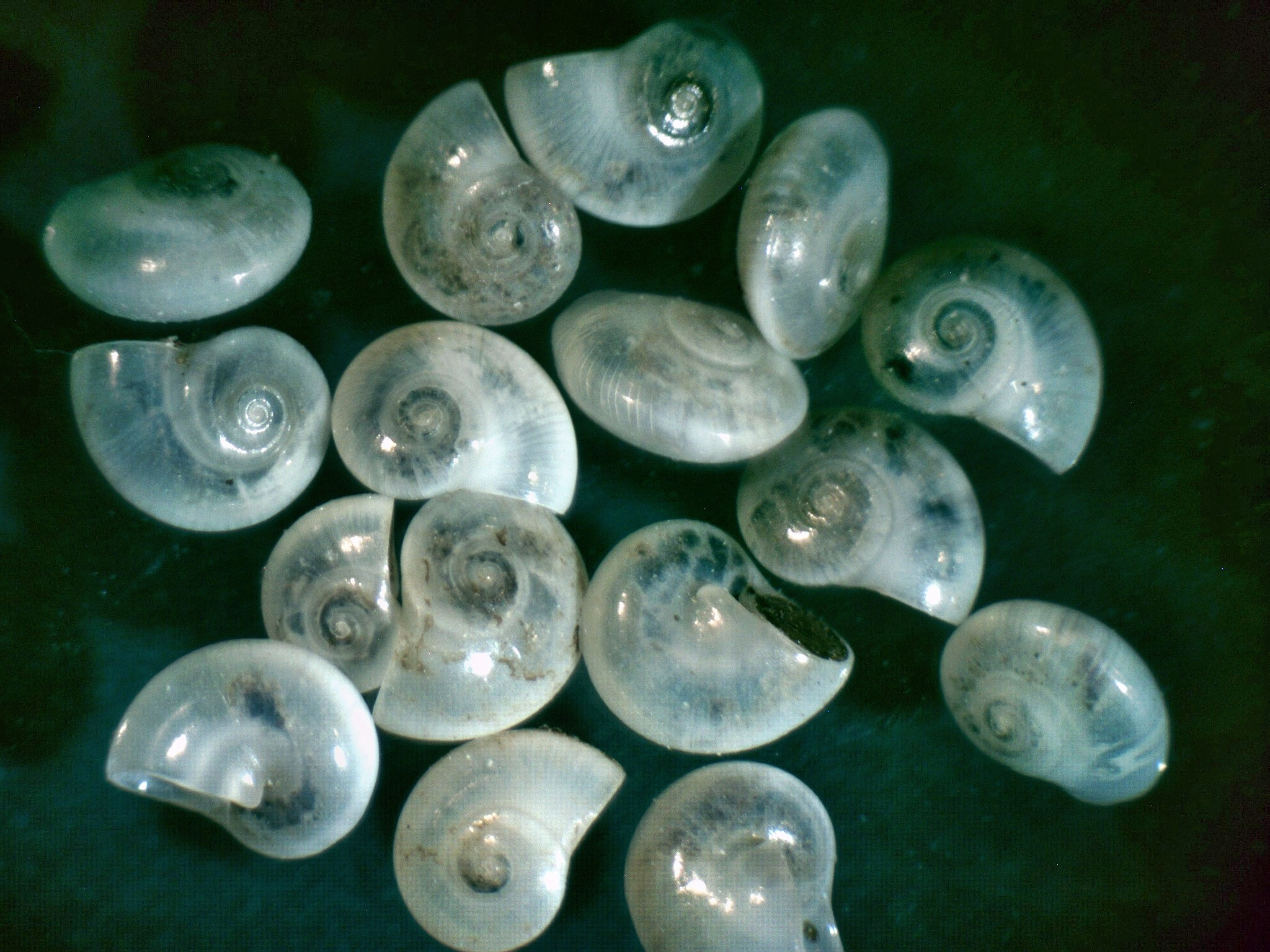
- Shells of Leucorhynchia caledonica

Scientific classification
- Kingdom: Animalia
- Phylum: Mollusca
- Class: Gastropoda
- Subclass: Vetigastropoda
- Order: Trochida
- Family: Skeneidae
- Genus: Leucorhynchia
- Species: L. caledonica

Binomial name
- Leucorhynchia caledonica Crosse, 1867

Synonyms
- Teinostoma (Leucorhynchia) caledonicum Crosse, 1867

= Leucorhynchia caledonica =

Species of gastropod

Leucorhynchia caledonica is a species of sea snail, a marine gastropod mollusk in the family Skeneidae.

== Description ==
The diameter of the shell is 3 mm. The polished, shining, whitish shell has a subdiscoidal shape and is slightly convex above and below. The spire contains 3 flattened whorls that are rapidly increasing. The periphery is carinate. The simple peristome is continuous and is thickened at the base and produced into a tongue-like callus past the umbilicus, leaving a perforation between it and the columellar wall.

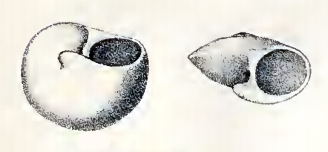
Two views of a shell of Leucorhynchia caledonica

== Distribution ==
This marine species occurs in the Western Pacific Ocean, off the Philippines, Indo-Malaysia, New Caledonia and Queensland, Australia; in the Indian Ocean off Réunion.
