= Ethalia rufula =

Scientific classification
- Kingdom: Animalia
- Phylum: Mollusca
- Class: Gastropoda
- Subclass: Vetigastropoda
- Order: Trochida
- Superfamily: Trochoidea
- Family: Trochidae
- Genus: Ethalia
- Species: E. rufula

Binomial name
- Ethalia rufula Gould, 1861

Synonyms
- Umbonium rufula (A. A. Gould, 1861)

Species of gastropod

Ethalia rufula is a species of sea snail, a marine gastropod mollusk in the family Trochidae, the top snails.

== Description ==
The height of the shell attains 4 mm, its diameter 6 mm. The small, polished shell has a lenticular shape. It shows almost square bright spots at the periphery and near the suture, and also red angular lines. The shell contains six slightly convex whorls with deep sutures. The base of the shell is reticulated rust-colored. The broad umbilicus has a colored margin. The aperture has an angular shape. The columellar callus is thin.

== Distribution ==
This marine species occurs off Japan.
