= Ethalia nitida =

Scientific classification
- Kingdom: Animalia
- Phylum: Mollusca
- Class: Gastropoda
- Subclass: Vetigastropoda
- Order: Trochida
- Superfamily: Trochoidea
- Family: Trochidae
- Genus: Ethalia
- Species: E. nitida

Binomial name
- Ethalia nitida A. Adams, 1863

Synonyms
- Umbonium nitida A. Adams, 1863

Species of gastropod

Ethalia nitida is a species of sea snail, a marine gastropod mollusk in the family Trochidae, the top snails.

== Description ==
The shell of this species is thin and helicoid, with smooth and polished whorls. The inner lip is callous and indented, but the callus is not sufficiently large to cover or conceal the umbilicus. The peristome is produced into an angle, which ascends on the body whorl.

== Distribution ==
This marine species occurs off Japan.
