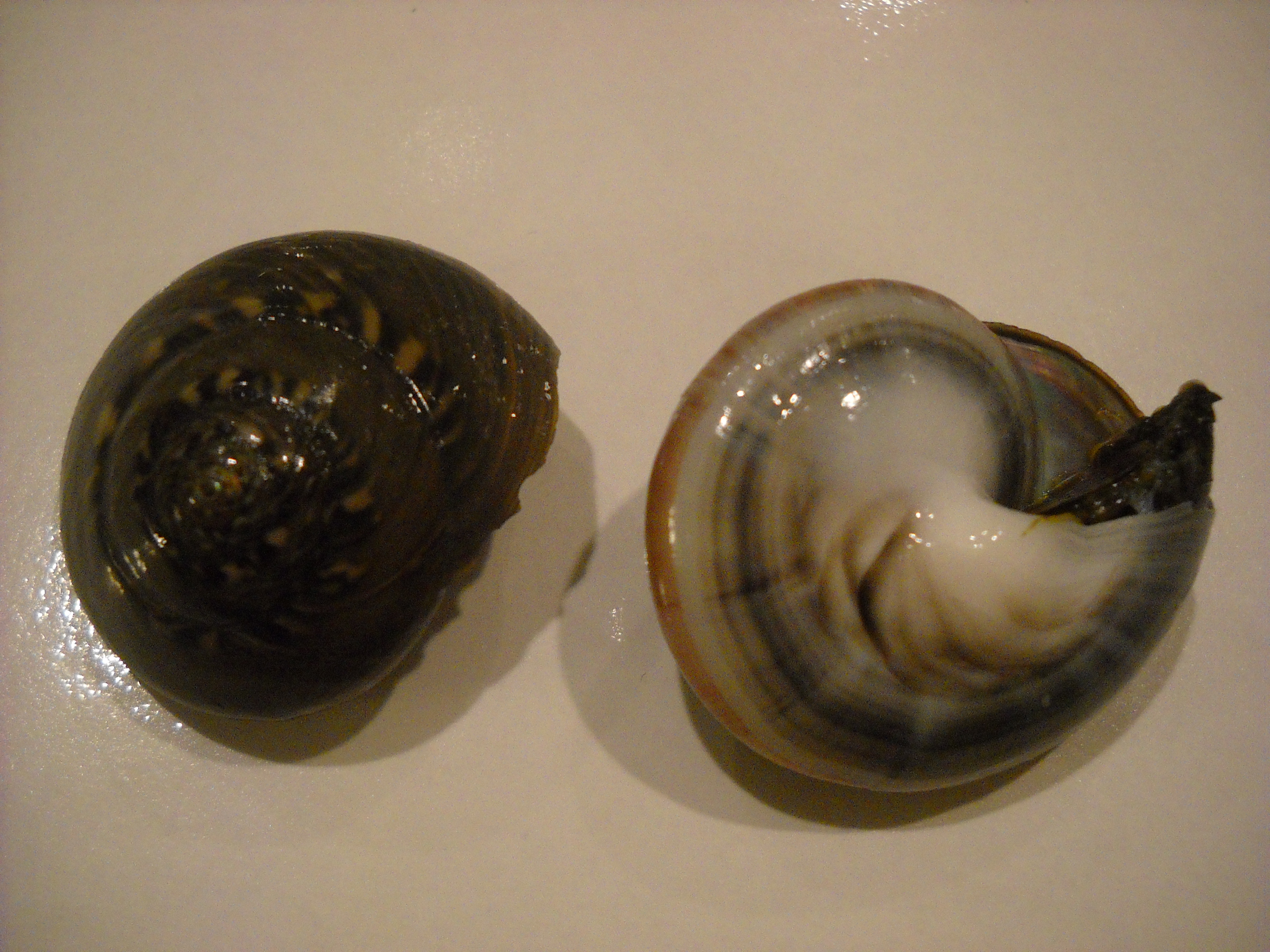
- Two shells of Umbonium giganteum

Scientific classification
- Kingdom: Animalia
- Phylum: Mollusca
- Class: Gastropoda
- Subclass: Vetigastropoda
- Order: Trochida
- Superfamily: Trochoidea
- Family: Trochidae
- Genus: Umbonium
- Species: U. giganteum

Binomial name
- Umbonium giganteum (Lesson, 1831)

Synonyms
- Globulus giganteus (Lesson, 1831); Rotella aucta Sowerby; Rotella gigantea Lesson, 1831 (original combination); Umbonium (Suchium) giganteum (Lesson, 1831)

= Umbonium giganteum =

Species of gastropod

Umbonium giganteum is a species of sea snail, a marine gastropod mollusk in the family Trochidae, the top snails.

== Description ==
The height of the shell attains 16 mm, its diameter 27 mm. The large, solid shell has a depressed shape. It is slate-colored or reddish above, with a series of black spots below the suture, sometimes alternating with white ones. The periphery is usually encircled with a row of white blotches. The base is largely white, with a dark streak encircling the callus. The low spire is conoidal and contains seven plane whorls. The body whorl is often somewhat concave above, rounded at the circumference, and slightly convex beneath. The shining surface is smooth, with a few (usually 4) narrow spiral impressed lines just above the periphery, which are obsolete in the adult. The convex base has a white callus or partly brown or ashen. In the middle there is a prominent, blunt, heavy tubercle. The oblique aperture is subquadrate.

This is largest species of Umbonium. The nearly smooth surface has a blotched periphery and a central tubercle on the callus pad distinguish it.

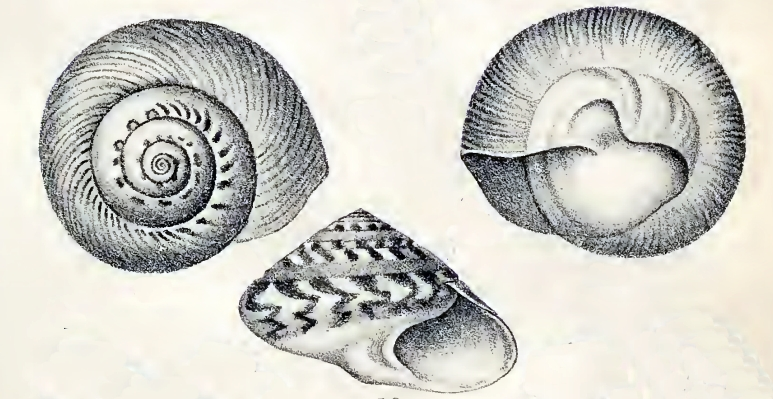
Drawing with three views of a shell of Umbonium giganteum

== Distribution ==
This marine species occurs in the Western Pacific and off Japan.
