= Leucorhynchia candida =

Scientific classification
- Kingdom: Animalia
- Phylum: Mollusca
- Class: Gastropoda
- Subclass: Vetigastropoda
- Order: Trochida
- Family: Skeneidae
- Genus: Leucorhynchia
- Species: L. candida

Binomial name
- Leucorhynchia candida (A. Adams, 1862)

Synonyms
- Ethalia candida A. Adams, 1862

Species of gastropod

Leucorhynchia candida is a species of sea snail, a marine gastropod mollusk in the family Skeneidae.

== Distribution ==
This marine species occurs off Japan.
