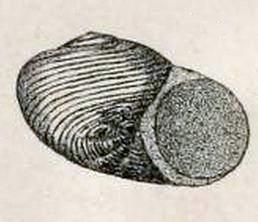
- Original drawing of a shell of Leucorhynchia lirata

Scientific classification
- Kingdom: Animalia
- Phylum: Mollusca
- Class: Gastropoda
- Subclass: Vetigastropoda
- Order: Trochida
- Family: Skeneidae
- Genus: Leucorhynchia
- Species: L. lirata

Binomial name
- Leucorhynchia lirata (E.A. Smith, 1871)

Synonyms
- Ethalia lirata E.A. Smith, 1871; Leucorhynchia lyrata [sic]; Teinostoma circularis Talavera, 1975; Teinostoma liratum Tomlin & Shackleford, 1915

= Leucorhynchia lirata =

Species of gastropod

Leucorhynchia lirata is a species of sea snail, a marine gastropod mollusk in the family Skeneidae.

== Description ==
The height of the shell attains 2 mm, its diameter 3 mm. The white, subimperforate shell is very small and has a globular shape. The spire contains 3½ finely lirate whorls. It is strongly plicate beneath the suture and around the umbilical callosity. The aperture is rounded. The peristome is continuous.

== Distribution ==
This species occurs in the Atlantic Ocean off Senegal and Angola.

== Bibliography ==
- Gofas, S.; Afonso, J.P.; Brandào, M. (Ed.). (S.a.). Conchas e Moluscos de Angola = Coquillages et Mollusques d'Angola. [Shells and molluscs of Angola]. Universidade Agostinho / Elf Aquitaine Angola: Angola. 140 pp
