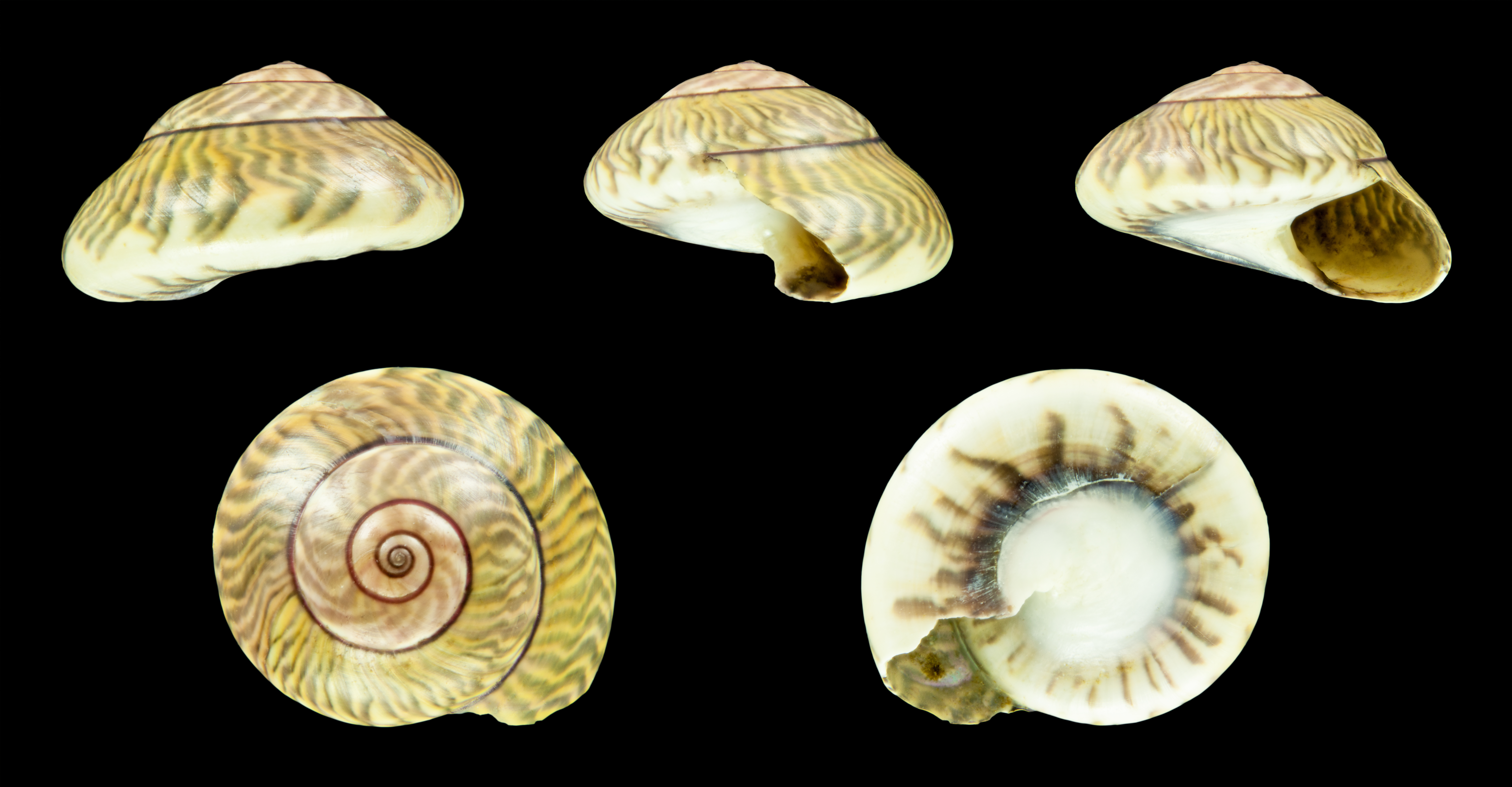

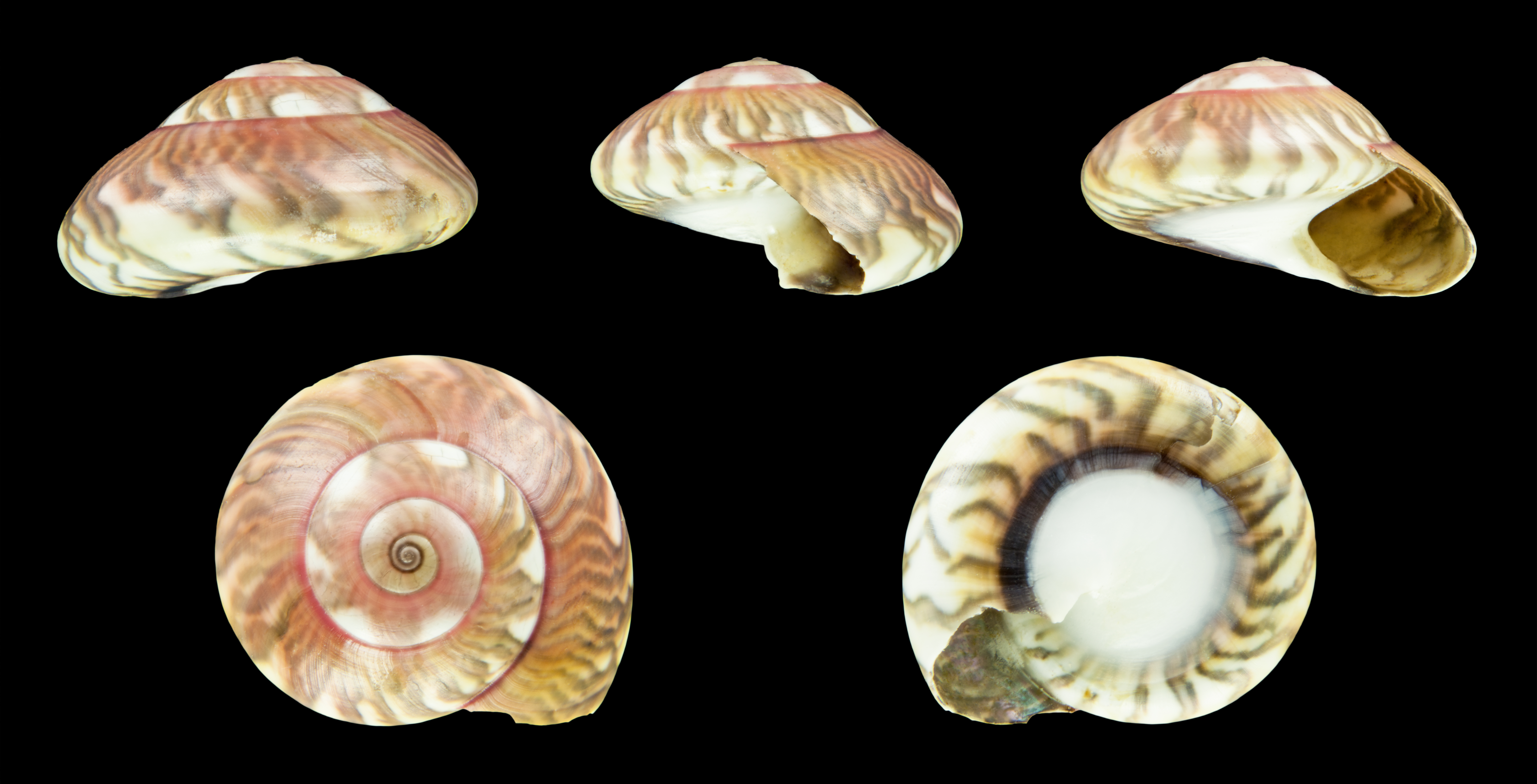

Scientific classification
- Kingdom: Animalia
- Phylum: Mollusca
- Class: Gastropoda
- Subclass: Vetigastropoda
- Order: Trochida
- Family: Trochidae
- Genus: Umbonium
- Species: U. thomasi

Binomial name
- Umbonium thomasi (Crosse, 1862)

Synonyms
- Umbonium adamsi Dunker

= Umbonium thomasi =

Species of gastropod

Umbonium thomasi is a species of sea snail, a marine gastropod mollusk in the family Trochidae, the top snails.
