= Lissotesta sobrina =

Scientific classification
- Kingdom: Animalia
- Phylum: Mollusca
- Class: Gastropoda
- Subclass: Vetigastropoda
- Superfamily: Seguenzioidea
- Family: incertae sedis
- Genus: Lissotesta
- Species: L. sobrina

Binomial name
- Lissotesta sobrina (A. Adams, 1861)

Synonyms
- Ethalia sobrina A. Adams, 1861; Skenea nipponica Yokoyama, 1920

Species of gastropod

Lissotesta sobrina is a species of sea snail, a marine gastropod mollusk, unassigned in the superfamily Seguenzioidea.
