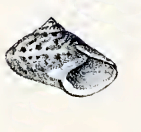
- Drawing of a shell of Ethalia striolata

Scientific classification
- Kingdom: Animalia
- Phylum: Mollusca
- Class: Gastropoda
- Subclass: Vetigastropoda
- Order: Trochida
- Superfamily: Trochoidea
- Family: Trochidae
- Genus: Ethalia
- Species: E. striolata

Binomial name
- Ethalia striolata (A. Adams, 1855)

Synonyms
- Ethalia (Ethaliella) striolata (A. Adams, 1855); Rotella striolata A. Adams in Sowerby; Rotella trilobata Sowerby; Trilobata trilobata Sowerby III, 1903.; Umbonium (Ethalia) striolatum Adams A., 1855 (original description)

= Ethalia striolata =

Species of gastropod

Ethalia striolata is a species of sea snail, a marine gastropod mollusk in the family Trochidae, the top snails.

== Description ==
The subglobulose, subperforate shell has a discoidal shape and is transversely striate. The five whorls are slightly convex. They are ornamented with very narrow transverse, white articulated lines. The base of the shell is smooth, reddish-brown maculated at the periphery, with a reddish zone around the umbilical region. The callus is white, small, partly concealing the umbilicus. The aperture is oval.

== Distribution ==
This marine species occurs in the Red Sea, off Mozambique, East Africa, Central and East Indian Ocean, Indo-Malaysia, Indonesia, Cocos Keeling Islands. and off Borneo.
