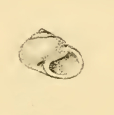
- Drawing of a shell of Ethalia polita

Scientific classification
- Kingdom: Animalia
- Phylum: Mollusca
- Class: Gastropoda
- Subclass: Vetigastropoda
- Order: Trochida
- Superfamily: Trochoidea
- Family: Trochidae
- Genus: Ethalia
- Species: E. polita

Binomial name
- Ethalia polita A. Adams, 1862

Synonyms
- Notopeplum victoriensis Cossmann, A.E.M.; Umbonium polita (A. Adams, 1862)

= Ethalia polita =

Species of gastropod

Ethalia polita is a species of sea snail, a marine gastropod mollusk in the family Trochidae, the top snails.

== Description ==
The white, solid, semi-opaque shell has an orbiculate-conoidal shape. The whorls are almost conical and the base is convex containing a large callus. The whorls are obsoletely transversely striated. The round aperture has a continuous peristome.

== Distribution ==
This marine species occurs off Japan.
