= Ethalia omphalotropis =

Scientific classification
- Kingdom: Animalia
- Phylum: Mollusca
- Class: Gastropoda
- Subclass: Vetigastropoda
- Order: Trochida
- Superfamily: Trochoidea
- Family: Trochidae
- Genus: Ethalia
- Species: E. omphalotropis

Binomial name
- Ethalia omphalotropis A. Adams, 1863

Synonyms
- Umbonium omphalotropis (A. Adams, 1863)

Species of gastropod

Ethalia omphalotropis is a species of sea snail, a marine gastropod mollusk in the family Trochidae, the top snails.

== Description ==
The small, semi-transparent shell has an ovate-discoidal shape. Its colour is white and entirely devoid of coloured markings. The 3½ convex whorls increase rapidly in size with deeply marked sutures. The body whorl has a spherical periphery. This species has a peculiar sharp keel surrounding the umbilicus. The aperture has an almost circular shape.

== Distribution ==
This marine species occurs off Japan.
