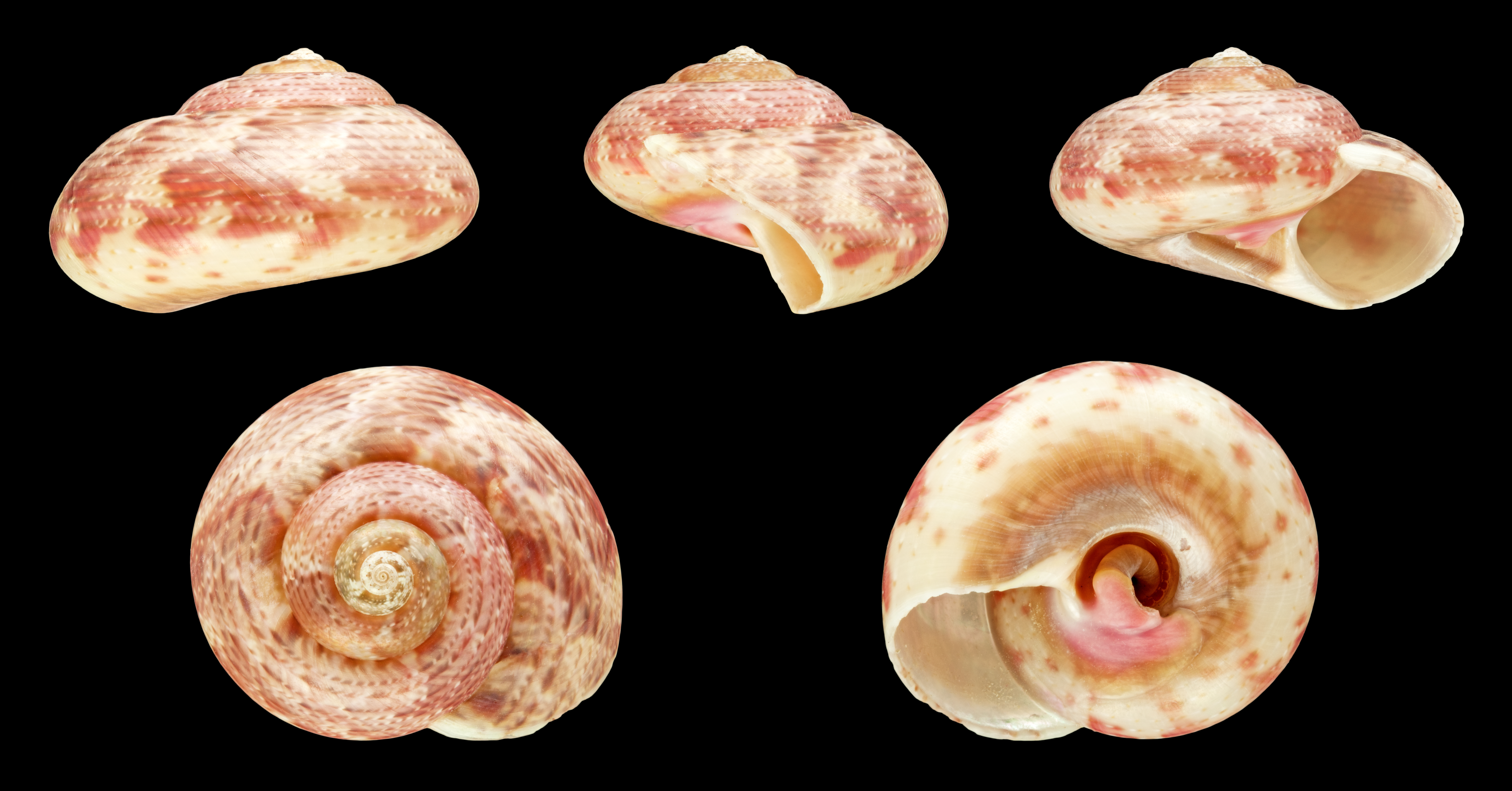
- A shell of Ethalia guamensis

Scientific classification
- Kingdom: Animalia
- Phylum: Mollusca
- Class: Gastropoda
- Subclass: Vetigastropoda
- Order: Trochida
- Family: Trochidae
- Subfamily: Umboniinae
- Genus: Ethalia
- Species: E. guamensis

Binomial name
- Ethalia guamensis (Quoy & Gaimard, 1834)

Synonyms
- Ethalia guamensis montrouzieri (Souverbie, 1859); Ethalia guamensis var. montrouzieri (Souverbie, 1859); Rotella guamensis Quoy & Gaimard, 1834 (original combination); Rotella montrouzieri Souverbie, 1860; Rotella montrouzieri var. montrouzieri (Souverbie, 1859); Umbonium guamensis J. R. C. Quoy & J. P. Gaimard, 1834; Umbonium (Ethalia) guamense A. Adams, 1853

= Ethalia guamensis =

Species of gastropod

Ethalia guamensis, common name the Guam button top shell, is a species of sea snail, a marine gastropod mollusk in the family Trochidae, the top snails.

The subspecies Ethalia guamensis selenomphala Pilsbry, 1905 is a taxon inquirendum.

== Description ==
The length of the shell varies between 10 mm and 25 mm. The depressed, polished shell is perforate, solid, strong, and smooth. Its color is whitish, mottled and lineolate above with brown, reddish, fawn-color or purplish, with 4 narrow spiral articulated lines, sometimes scarcely visible because of the variegated coloration. The color of the base is lighter. There are six whorls, convex, the last one rounded and convex beneath. The suture is impressed. The aperture is oblique. The outer wall is moderately thick. The columella is strong and thick, arcuate above, spread upon the body whorl and nearly over the umbilicus in a pad of callus, which is either white, pink or deep crimson. The callus is kidney-shaped, but slightly convex, filling the umbilicus except a narrow chink. From the outer termination of the callus an arcuate groove extends to the base of the columella, within which the surface of the shell is radiately finely striate and darker colored.

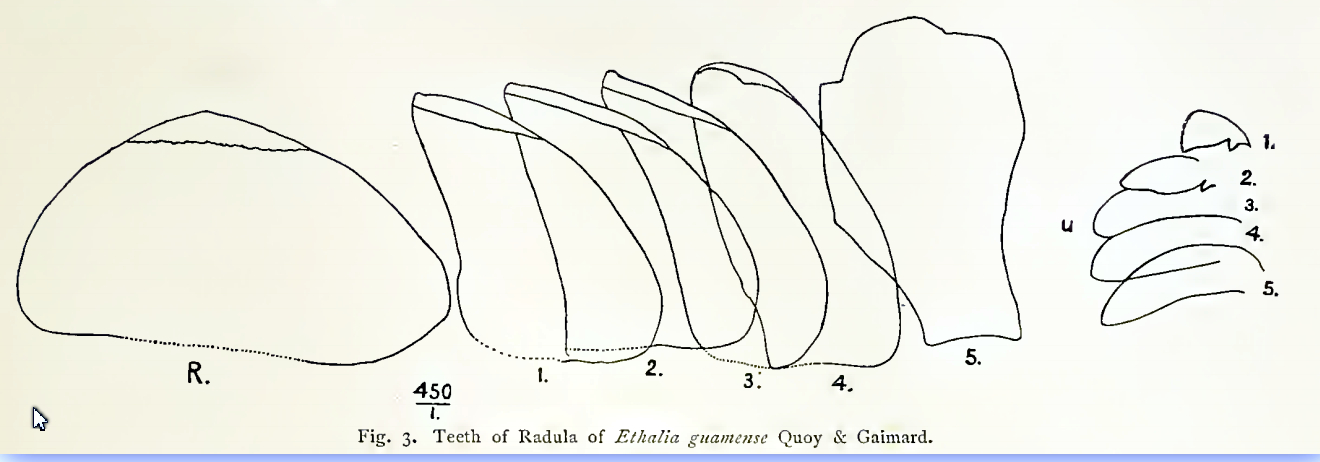
Radula of Ethalia guamensis

Radula: The teeth, especially those of the central part are very thin and transparent, without distinct cusps; the rhachidian tooth (R) is broadly winged, bow-shaped, at its upper part it is thickened, a true cusp cannot be detected. The first (i), second (2), third (3) and fourth (4) laterals are about equal in shape. The first one is subtriangular, with a slightly concave inner and convex outer margin, thickened at its upper part, the second is very similar, the third is narrower and the fourth is more subquadrangularly elongate; the fifth (5) or last lateral is club-shaped, thickened above, without cusp. Of the uncini (U) the proximal one has a short, broad cusp, with a small denticle near the base of the distal margin; the second is more elongate, also with a small denticle; the subsequent ones are much more elongate, No denticles can be detected, perhaps because the cusps lie so close together, as to cover each other in part.

== Distribution ==
This marine species occurs off Southeast Asia, Guam, the Philippines, Japan and Australia.
