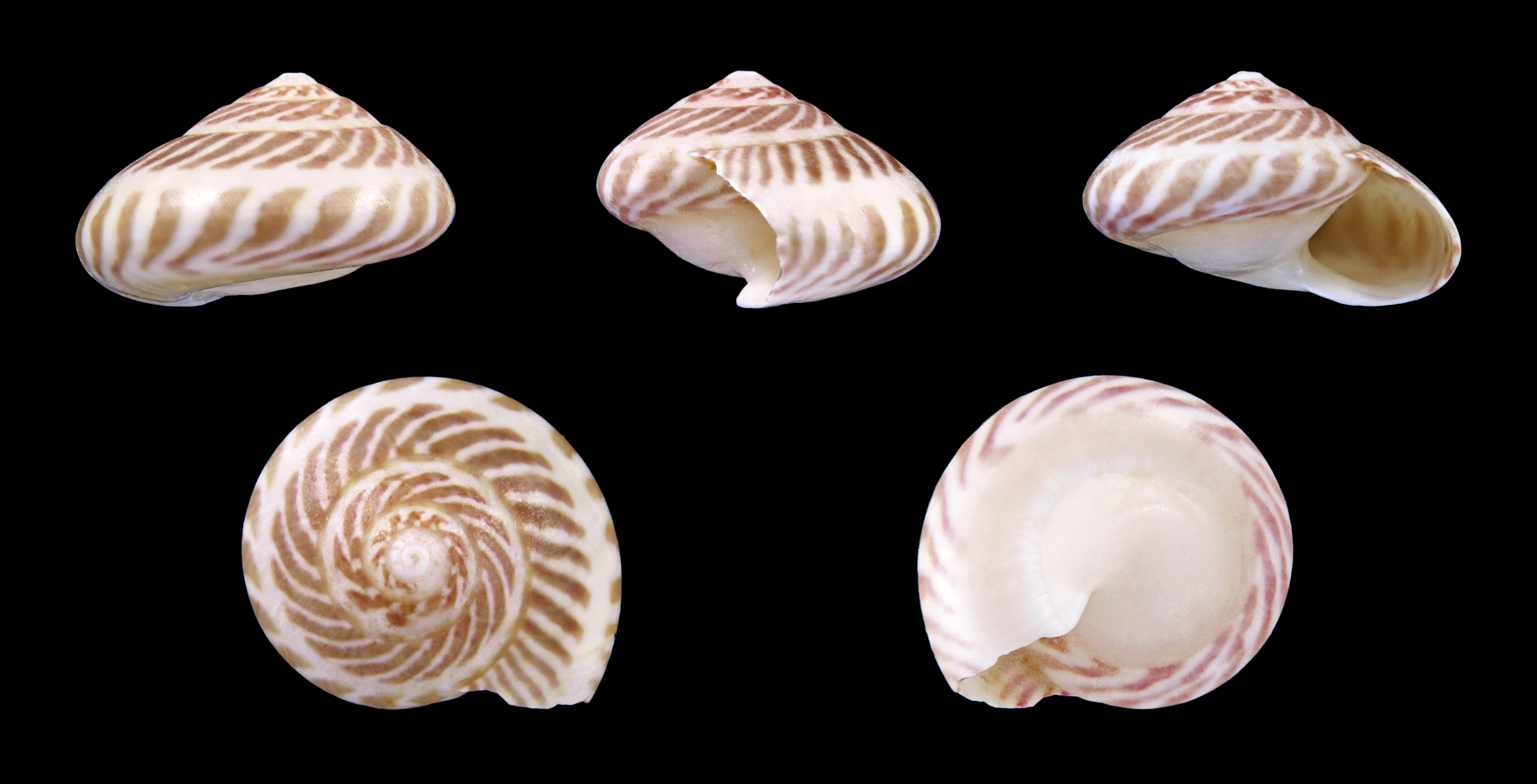

Scientific classification
- Kingdom: Animalia
- Phylum: Mollusca
- Class: Gastropoda
- Subclass: Vetigastropoda
- Order: Trochida
- Family: Trochidae
- Genus: Umbonium
- Species: U. vestiarium

Binomial name
- Umbonium vestiarium (Linnaeus, 1758)

Synonyms
- Globulus vestiarius Schumacher, 1817 (unnecessary substitute name and thus objective synonym); Rotella lineolata Lamarck, 1822; Trochus vestiarius Linnaeus, 1758

= Umbonium vestiarium =

Species of mollusc

Umbonium vestiarium, common name the button tops, is a species of sea snail, a marine gastropod mollusk in the family Trochidae, the top snails.

== Description ==
The solid, rounded shells are up to 2 cm wide. They are similar to Oxystele but are more flattened and show a glossy, highly variable and colourfully patterned exterior.

== Habitat ==
They can be found on eulittoral sand.

== Distribution ==
Indo-Pacific.

== Use ==
In Vietnam, they are called "ốc ruốc" and commonly sold as a snack.
