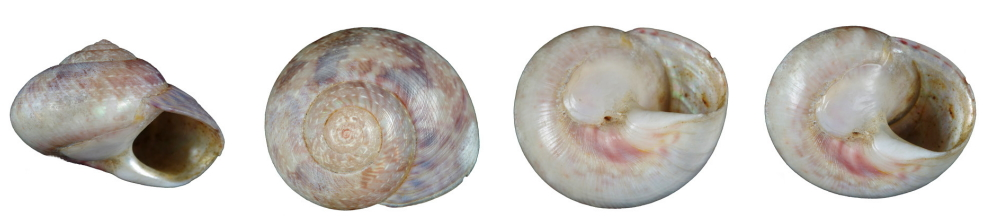
- Shell of Ethalia montrouzieri (holotype)

Scientific classification
- Kingdom: Animalia
- Phylum: Mollusca
- Class: Gastropoda
- Subclass: Vetigastropoda
- Order: Trochida
- Family: Trochidae
- Subfamily: Umboniinae
- Genus: Ethalia
- Species: E. montrouzieri

Binomial name
- Ethalia montrouzieri (Souverbie, 1859)

Synonyms
- Ethalia guamensis var. montrouzieri Pilsbry 1889; Rotella montrouzieri Souverbie, 1859

= Ethalia montrouzieri =

Species of gastropod

Ethalia montrouzieri is a species of sea snail, a marine gastropod mollusk in the family Trochidae, the top snails.

== Description ==
The length of the shell attains 13 mm, its diameter 15 mm.

(Original description in Latin) The shell is subumbilicate, discoidal, and convex, with obliquely undulating striae on both the upper and lower surfaces. The upper surface is further ornamented with impressed spiral striae that decussate the oblique sculpture. The shell is grey, encircled by spiral bands articulated with alternating white and reddish-brown, heart-shaped markings, and is further decorated with irregularly distributed spots of various colours. It comprises 6.5 convex whorls. The body whorl is marked below by a pale greyish-white band speckled with grey, while the middle of the base bears a broad white callus.

(More recent description) This is a moderate to large, globose-lenticular species (diameter up to 22 mm, but usually less than 18 mm). The shell is glossy and typically *Ethalia*-like, with a deep body whorl, the periphery situated below the mid-whorl, and a shallowly impressed suture. The whorl profile is somewhat variable, with some specimens exhibiting an indistinct, rounded shoulder

Although highly glossy, the shell is not devoid of sculpture. The early teleoconch whorls bear fine spiral lirae, which gradually broaden and become flatter-topped with growth. On the middle spire whorls, the sculpture appear to a variable extent, leaving the surface sculptured primarily by fine, closely spaced growth lines. Most of the base is almost completely smooth, except for the peri-umbilical region, which is slightly thickened and bears microscopic spiral threads interwoven with curved axial threads. In adult specimens, the umbilicus is almost entirely occluded by a callus extending from the parietal wall, although a small umbilical chink usually remains. The callus is dull rather than glossy and bears indistinct wrinkles. In juveniles, the umbilicus remains fully patent but becomes progressively obstructed by the expanding callus during growth. The columellar lip is thickened and includes a nacreous median region between the parietal callus and the thickened termination of the umbilical rim, the latter bearing indistinct oblique ridges.

The colour pattern is variable, although the ground colour is usually pale fawn-grey to pale fawn-brown, mottled with darker lines and blotches in shades of olive-green, grey-green, grey-brown, and reddish-brown. The subsutural region frequently bears a band of radiating brown to reddish-brown lines (Fig. 8F, L). Between this band and the periphery are several fine spiral capillary lines composed of alternating white and darker chevron-like markings. The periphery and outer region of the base are either uniformly white or ornamented with bold reddish-brown to maroon-brown triangular blotches extending onto the outer base. The remainder of the base is uniformly dirty white to yellowish white, whereas the thickened peri-umbilical region is frequently heavily marked with grey-brown or maroon-brown pigmentation. The umbilical callus and columella are white, although the base of the columella and the area surrounding the umbilical chink are sometimes yellow to yellowish orange. Specimens from the Chesterfield–Bellona Plateau commonly exhibit an overall pinkish hue.

The protoconch is Typical for the subfamily Umboniinae, with a diameter of approximately 200 μm. The apical beak is present and confluent with the terminal lip. The apical bulb is usually worn but retains traces of an irregular network of fine threads. The terminal lip is weakly convex.

The operculum is corneous, moderately thick, and dark yellowish brown. It is multispiral, although not tightly coiled, with a relatively long growing margin. The peripheral fringe is narrow, and overlap between successive whorls is limited. The outer surface lacks spiral microsculpture.

The formula of the radula is ∞ + (1) + 5 + 1 + 5 + (1) + ∞, comprising approximately 50 transverse rows of teeth. The teeth of the central field possess distinct basal plates, but their shafts and cusps are absent. The rachidian tooth is broader than long. Lateral teeth 1–4 are subtriangular and constricted anteriorly, representing vestiges of the shaft. Lateral teeth 2–4 have the outer margin slightly elevated and thickened. The fifth lateral tooth is subquadrate and elongate. The innermost marginal tooth is transitional, with a stout basal plate and a reduced shaft and cusp. The remaining marginal teeth are well developed, with narrow shafts and strongly recurved cusps. The cusps of the inner marginal teeth bear a large, bluntly lanceolate central denticle, flanked by one or two small pointed denticles at the outer base and an even smaller, more slender denticle at the inner base, although the latter is usually obscured by overlap between adjacent teeth. Marginal teeth 3–10 possess the largest cusps. Beyond these, the cusps become progressively smaller and bear increasingly numerous, finer denticles, with the outermost teeth exhibiting finely pectinate margins.

External anatomy (based on photographs and rehydrated specimens: The head bears a distinct forehead between the cephalic tentacles. The snout is moderately long and cylindrical, with a single transverse row of digitiform papillae halfway down its anterior surface and additional similar papillae on the distal quarter. The cephalic lappets are small and have smooth margins. The cephalic tentacles are long, slender, and micropapillate, with the left and right tentacles similar in size. The eyestalks are long, their distal ends conspicuously expanded and containing large black eyes with the apertures directed dorsally. The left neck lobe consists of a row of 10–15 closely spaced, non-papillate digitiform projections, which are larger anteriorly, alternate in size, and gradually decrease posteriorly. The right neck lobe is well developed and rolled into an exhalant siphon. Four micropapillate epipodial tentacles are present on each side, each bearing a well-developed stalked epipodial sense organ near its base. An additional epipodial sense organ is present beneath each neck lobe. The propodium is slightly indented medially and bears a small lateral propodial lobe on each side. The foot is flattened, with a broad sole that tapers posteriorly.

The head-foot is predominantly pale translucent greyish white. The eyestalks, digitiform processes of the left neck lobe, epipodial fringe, and epipodial sense organs are marked with opaque white pigment. The forehead and anterior portion of the snout are often tinged yellowish brown, while the columellar region above the operculum is a darker yellowish brown. The cephalic and epipodial tentacles bear faint transverse dark bands. The sides of the foot are white, whereas the sole is often mottled with grey-brown pigmentation. The ctenidium is predominantly bipectinate, with its anterior portion remaining unattached.

== Distribution ==
This marine species occurs off New Caledonia.
