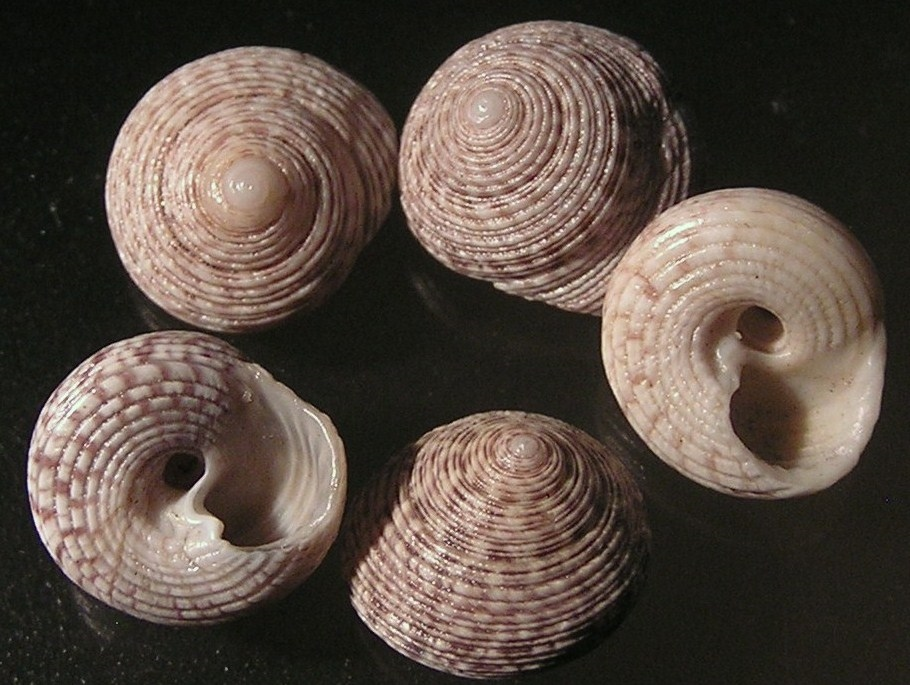
- Monilea callifera

Scientific classification
- Kingdom: Animalia
- Phylum: Mollusca
- Class: Gastropoda
- Subclass: Vetigastropoda
- Order: Trochida
- Superfamily: Trochoidea
- Family: Trochidae
- Genus: Monilea; Swainson, 1840

Type species
- Trochus calliferus Lamarck, 1822

Synonyms
- Monilea (Minolia) Adams, 1860; Monilea (Monilea) Swainson, 1840; Monilia (Incorrect subsequent spelling); Talopena Iredale, 1918; Talopia Gray, 1842; Trochus (Monilea) Swainson, 1840

= Monilea =

Genus of gastropods

Monilea is a genus of sea snails in the family Trochidae, the top snails.

== Description ==
The solid shell has a depressed-conical shape. The outer surface is sharply, spirally striate and closely obliquely striate. The shell has a more or less developed callous ridge or funicle revolving on the inner side of the whorl within the umbilicus, and terminating at the columella, the edge of which is reflexed over it. The sinuous columella terminates in a point or denticle at its base. The outer lip is lirate within.

== Distribution ==
The habitat of most species is in the Indian Ocean, but some occur in the Pacific Ocean.

== Species ==
Species within the genus Monilea include:

- Monilea callifera (Lamarck, 1822), the type species
- Monilea carmesina (Webster G.H., 1908): synonym of Thoristella carmesina (W. H. Webster, 1908): synonym of Coelotrochus carmesinus (W. H. Webster, 1908)
- Monilea chiliarches Melvill, 1910 (taxon inquirendum)
- Monilea celebensis Schepman, 1908
- Monilea cocoa Okutani, 2001
- Monilea discerna (Iredale, 1937):(synonym: Talopena discerna Iredale, 1937: synonym of Sericominolia gloriola (Iredale, 1929) (superseded combination)
- Monilea engae Thach, 2025
- Monilea frausseni Thach, 2023
- Monilea gloriola (Iredale, 1929): synonym of Sericominolia gloriola (Iredale, 1929) (superseded combination)
- † Monilea grantmackiei Hayward, 1981
- Monilea haebaruensis MacNeil, 1961
- Monilea lentiginosa (A. Adams, 1853)
- † Monilea lifuana (Fischer, 1878): synonym of Sericominolia lifuana (P. Fischer, 1878) (superseded combination)
- Monilea marshallensis Ladd, 1966
- † Monilea mateana Ladd, 1934
- Monilea moolenbeeki Thach, 2023
- Monilea ngai Thach, 2023
- Monilea pantanellii (Caramagna, 1888): synonym of Gibbula pantanellii Caramagna, 1888: synonym of Minolia variabilis H. Adams, 1873: synonym of Pagodatrochus variabilis (H. Adams, 1873)
- Monilea patricia (Philippi, 1851)
- Monilea phanriensis Thach, 2025
- † Monilea riorapelensis S. N. Nielsen, Frassinetti & Bandel, 2004
- Monilea simulans Smith, 1899
- Monilea sliekeri Thach, 2025
- Monilea smithi (Wood, 1828)
- Monilea solandri (R. A. Philippi, 1851)
- Monilea warnefordi (G. Nevill & H. Nevill, 1874)

The Indo-Pacific Molluscan Database also includes the following names in current use

- Monilea pudibunda Fischer, 1878: (uncertain > unassessed, use in recent literature not established by editor)
- Monilea rosea Tenison-Woods, 1876: synonym of Planacollonista rosea (Tenison Woods, 1876)
- Monilea turbinata Tenison-Woods, 1877: synonym of Astele turbinata (Tenison Woods, 1877): synonym of Chlorostoma scalaris (R. A. Philippi, 1844): synonym of Tegula lividomaculata (C. B. Adams, 1845): synonym of Agathistoma lividomaculatum (C. B. Adams, 1845) (original combination)
- Monilea unicarinata (Fischer, 1879)

== Synonyms ==
- Subgenus Monilea (Priotrochus) Fischer, 1880: synonym of Priotrochus P. Fischer, 1879
- Monilea apicina Gould, 1861; synonym of Parminolia apicina (Gould, 1861): synonym of Talopena apicina (A. A. Gould, 1861)
- Monilea belcheri (Philippi, 1849): synonym of Talopena belcheri (R. A. Philippi, 1850) (superseded combination)
- Monilea calyculus (Wood, 1828): synonym of Talopena calyculus (W. Wood, 1828) (superseded combination)
- Monilea chrysolamea (Martens, 1880): synonym of Priotrochus goudoti (Fischer, 1878)
- Monilea corrugata A. Adams, 1854: synonym of Monilea lentiginosa (A. Adams, 1853)
- Monilea degregorii (Caramagna, 1888): synonym of Ethminolia degregorii (Caramagna, 1888)
- Monilea goudoti (P. Fisher, 1878): synonym of Priotrochus goudoti (Fischer, 1878)
- Monilea incerta Iredale, 1912: synonym of Talopena incerta (Iredale, 1912) (superseded combination)
- Monilea kalisoma A. Adams, 1853 (?): synonym of Monilea patricia (Philippi, 1851)
- Monilea laevissima (Martens, 1881): synonym of Ilanga laevissima (Martens, 1881)
- Monilea morti (Iredale, 1929): synonym of Monilea lentiginosa (A. Adams, 1853)
- Monilea nucleus (Philippi, 1849): synonym of Rossiteria nucleus (Philippi, 1849)
- Monilea obscura (Wood, 1828): synonym of Priotrochus obscurus (W. Wood, 1828)
- Monilea oleacea Hedley & Petterd, 1906: synonym of Archiminolia oleacea (Hedley & Petterd, 1906)
- Monilea philippensis (Watson, 1881): synonym of Spectamen philippense (Watson, 1881)
- Monilea philippii A. Adams, 1855: synonym of Talopena philippii (A. Adams, 1855)
- Monilea ponsonbyi (G.B. Sowerby, 1888) synonym of Priotrochus obscurus ponsonbyi (G.B. sowerby, 1888)
- Monilea rhodomphala (Souverbie in Souverbie & Montrouzier, 1875): synonym of Trochus rhodomphalus Souverbie in Souverbie & Montrouzier, 1875 (species inquirenda)
- Monilea rotundata Sowerby III, 1894: synonym of Minolia rotundata (Sowerby III, 1894)
- Monilea semireticulata Suter, 1908: synonym of Minolia semireticulata (Suter, 1908)
- Monilea singaporensis : synonym of Minolia singaporensis (Pilsbry, 1889)
- Monilea spuria Gould, 1861: synonym of Cinysca spuria (Gould, 1861)
- Monilea vernicosa Gould, 1861: synonym of Sericominolia vernicosa (Gould, 1861)
- Monilea zealandica Hutton, 1873: synonym of Antisolarium egenum (Gould, 1849)
