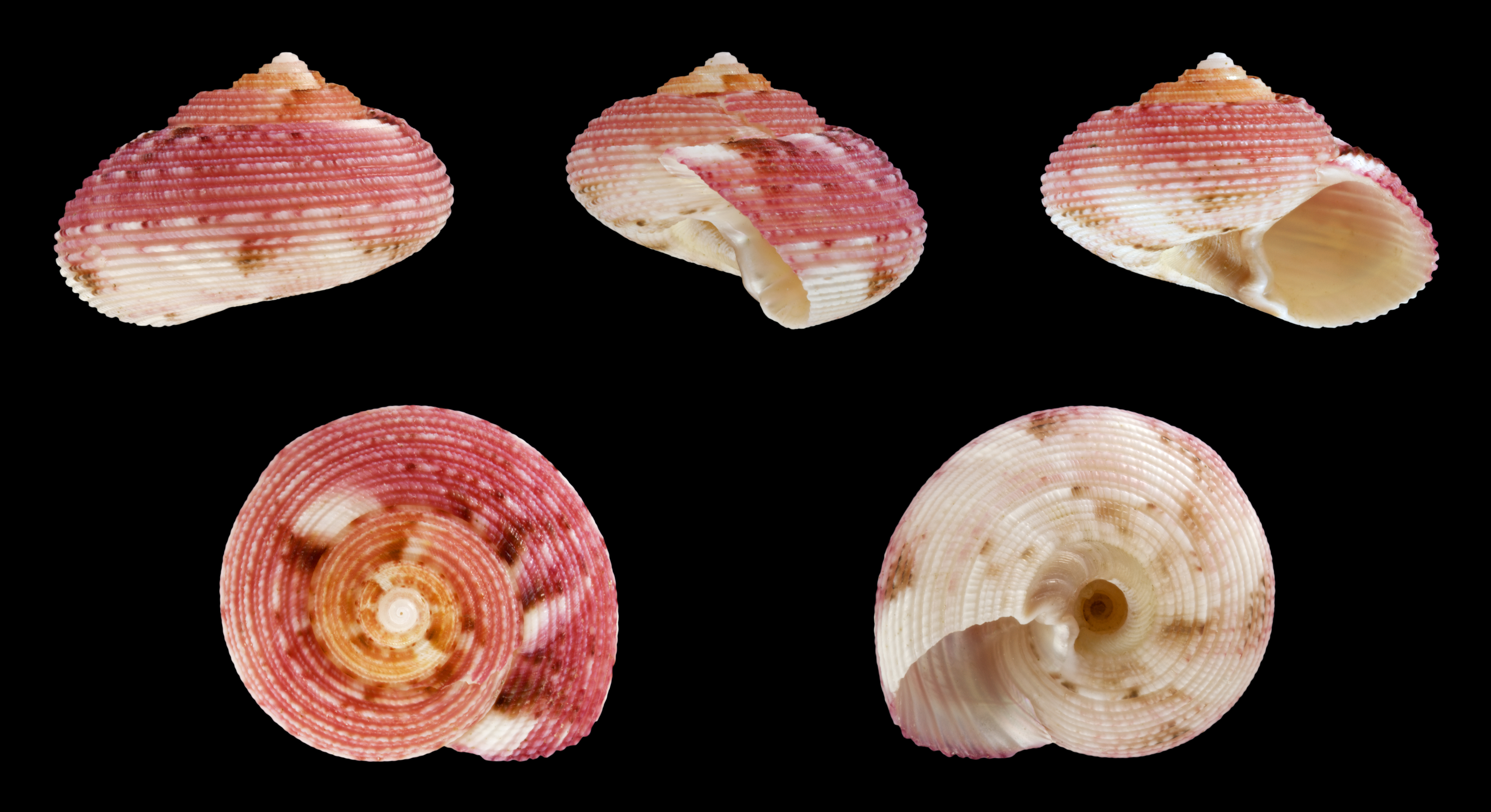
- Shell of Talopena belcheri

Scientific classification
- Kingdom: Animalia
- Phylum: Mollusca
- Class: Gastropoda
- Subclass: Vetigastropoda
- Order: Trochida
- Superfamily: Trochoidea
- Family: Trochidae
- Genus: Talopena; Iredale, 1918

Type species
- Monilea incerta Iredale, 1912

= Talopena =

Genus of gastropods

Talopena is a genus of sea snails in the family Trochidae, the top snails.

== Taxonomy ==
Talopena Iredale, 1918 is recognised again as a full genus rather than a subgenus or synonym of Monilea Swainson, 1840.

== General characteristics ==
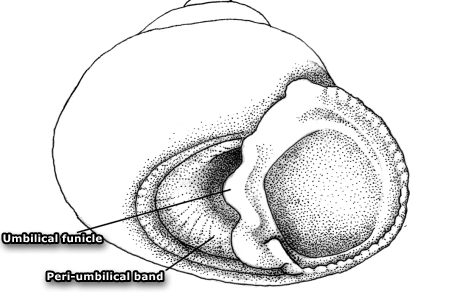
Umbilical features of a shell of Talopena

The stout shell has a depressed turbiniform to trochoid‑turbiniform shape. It is of moderate size, with a diameter of up to 17.0 mm. The whorls are rounded, with the periphery lying below mid‑whorl and the base somewhat flatter. The sculpture consists of spiral cords with fine axial pliculae in the intervals. The umbilicus is open and is bounded by a thickened spiral peri-umbilical band that bears curved axial pliculae; within the umbilicus there is a distinct, low and broad funicle. The columellar lip is thickened both basally and at the end of the funicle. The outer lip is simple, and its interior is smooth.

The operculum is corneous, relatively thick, and multispiral, though not tightly coiled; the whorl overlap is narrow, as is the peripheral fringe, and there is no spiral microsculpture. The radula has relatively robust base‑plates on both the rachidian and lateral teeth. The inner marginal tooth is transitional, with a reduced cusp, while the marginal teeth numbered 3–10 bear the largest cusps, which are long and spathulate, with a shallow medial furrow and one to two small denticles at the outer base.

The external anatomy is conventionally trochid with a broad forehead and snout, a simply digitate left neck-lobe and a bipectinate ctenidium and its anterior portion remains unattached.

== Species ==
- Talopena apicina (A. A. Gould, 1861)
- Talopena belcheri (R. A. Philippi, 1850)
- Talopena calyculus (W. Wood, 1828)
- Talopena incerta (Iredale, 1912)
- Talopena maestratii D. G. Herbert, 2024
- Talopena masoni (G. Nevill & H. Nevill, 1874)
- Talopena menkei (A. Adams, 1855)
- Talopena philippii (A. Adams, 1855)
- Talopena tramieri (Poppe, Tagaro & H. Dekker, 2006)

Synonyms

- Talopena? glaphyrella Héros et al. 2007: synonym of Kanakina glaphyrella (Melvill & Standen, 1895)
- Talopena gloriola Iredale, 1929: synonym of Sericominolia gloriola (Iredale, 1929) (superseded combination)
- Talopena lifuana Iredale 1929: synonym of Sericominolia lifuana (Fischer, 1878)
- Talopena sublaevis H. J. Finlay, 1924: synonym of Micrelenchus tessellatus (A. Adams, 1853) (junior subjective synonym)
- Talopena vernicosa (A. A. Gould, 1861): synonym of Sericominolia vernicosa (A. A. Gould, 1861) (superseded combination)
