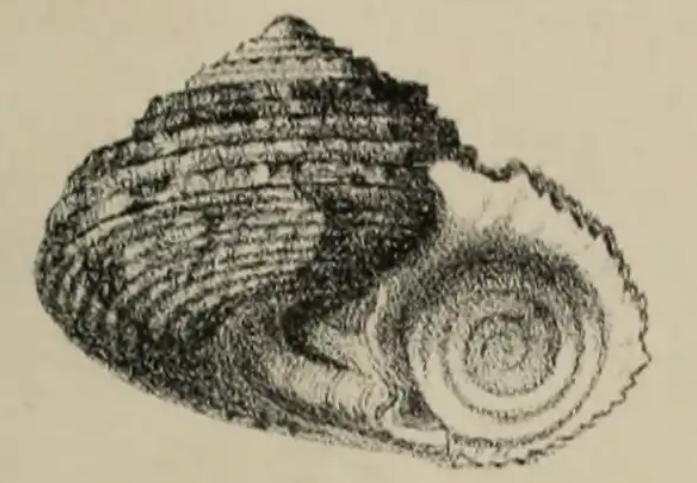
- Shell of Talopena masoni (holotype)

Scientific classification
- Kingdom: Animalia
- Phylum: Mollusca
- Class: Gastropoda
- Subclass: Vetigastropoda
- Order: Trochida
- Superfamily: Trochoidea
- Family: Trochidae
- Genus: Talopena
- Species: T. masoni

Binomial name
- Talopena masoni (G. Nevill & H. Nevill, 1874)

Synonyms
- Monilea (Monilea) masoni (G. Nevill & H. Nevill, 1874); Monilea masoni (G. Nevill & H. Nevill, 1874) superseded combination; Trochus (Monilea) masoni G. Nevill & H. Nevill, 1874 superseded combination

= Talopena masoni =

Species of gastropod

Talopena masoni is a species of sea snail, a marine gastropod mollusk in the family Trochidae, the top snails.

== Description ==
The length of the shell attains 11 mm, its diameter 16 mm.

(Original description) The shell in form resembles Monilea callifera Lamarck, 1822 but is more depressed. The six whorls are closely and sharply spirally keeled, with alternate keels larger, and the surface is very closely and obliquely decussated both on the ridges and in the interstices, whereas in M. callifera the decussation affects only the ridges. The shell is flesh-coloured or white, the upper surface being radiately striped at wide intervals with reddish brown, these stripes being partly continued onto the base and the whole shell being irregularly and closely mottled with brown.

The base is closely ribbed, the ribs being scabrously decussated. A broad, raised callosity encircles the open umbilicus, this callous rib being very closely and regularly convexly striated. The columellar margin is very thick and callous and is much contorted. The interior of the aperture is only faintly striated, and the nacre is very thick and highly lustrous.

The shell of T. masoni is less elevated (H/D <0.70) than Talopena maestratii.It has very unequal spiral cords (of two or three orders) on the spire whorls and has a distinct narrow groove at the outer edge of the peri-umbilical band.

== Distribution ==
This marine species occurs off the Andaman Islands.
