= Monilea simulans =

Scientific classification
- Kingdom: Animalia
- Phylum: Mollusca
- Class: Gastropoda
- Subclass: Vetigastropoda
- Order: Trochida
- Superfamily: Trochoidea
- Family: Trochidae
- Genus: Monilea
- Species: M. simulans

Binomial name
- Monilea simulans (E. A. Smith, 1899)

Synonyms
- Monilia simulans E.A. Smith, 1899; Trochus (Monilea) warnefordi G. & H. Nevill

Species of sea snail

Monilea simulans is a species of sea snail, a marine gastropod mollusk in the family Trochidae, the top snails.

== Description ==
This species differs from the type species (Monilea callifera) in having only faint indications of the nodose plications at the upper angle of the whorls. It also differs in color, being paler and less rosy.

== Distribution ==
This marine species occurs off the Maldives, the Laccadives in the South China Sea and off Japan.
