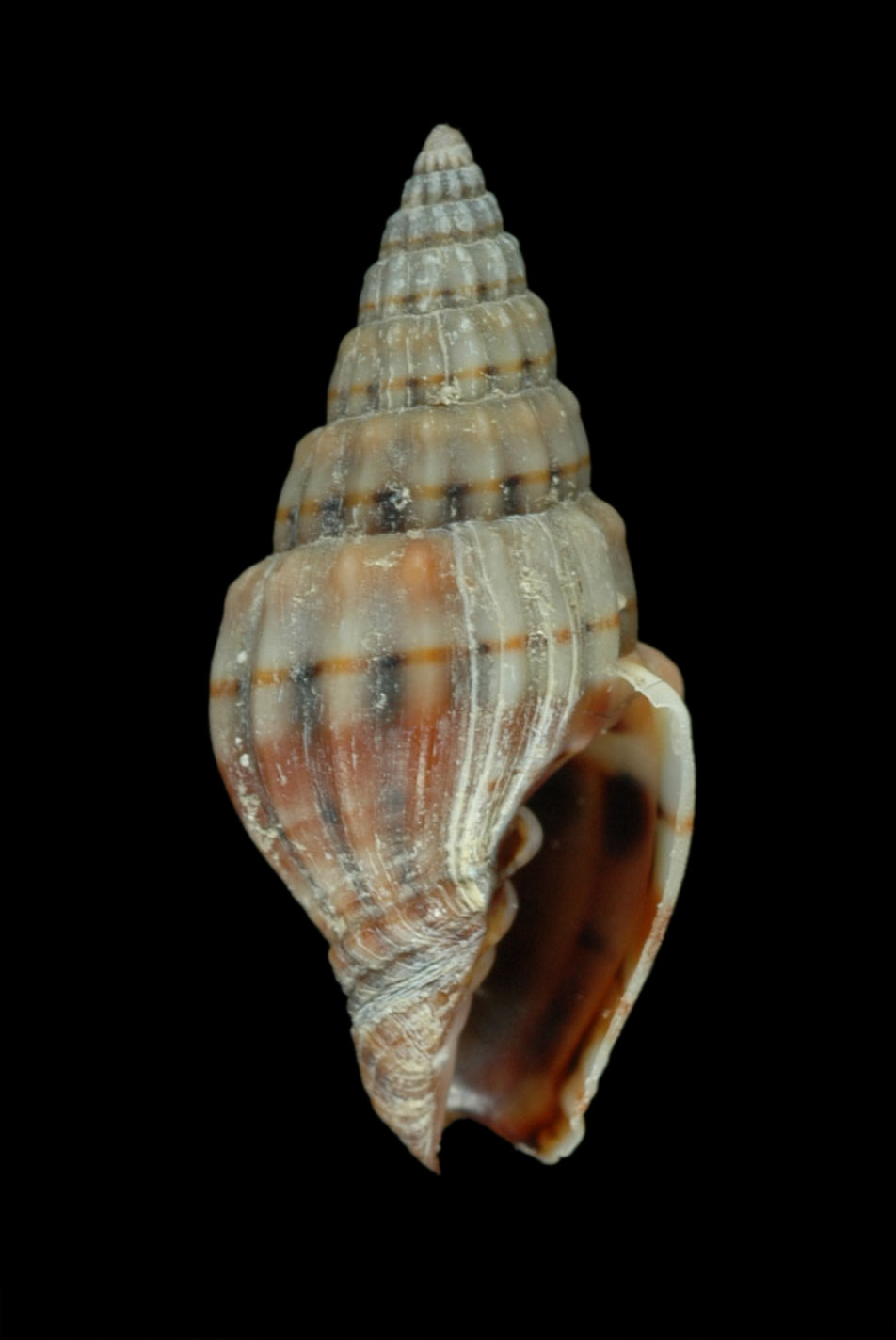

Scientific classification
- Kingdom: Animalia
- Phylum: Mollusca
- Class: Gastropoda
- Subclass: Caenogastropoda
- Order: Neogastropoda
- Superfamily: Turbinelloidea
- Family: Costellariidae
- Genus: Vexillum
- Species: V. unifasciatum

Binomial name
- Vexillum unifasciatum (Wood, 1828)

Synonyms
- Costellaria unifasciata (W. Wood, 1828); Vexillum (Costellaria) unifasciatum (W. Wood, 1828); Voluta unifasciata W. Wood, 1828

= Vexillum unifasciatum =

Species of gastropod

Vexillum unifasciatum is a species of small sea snail, marine gastropod mollusk in the family Costellariidae, the ribbed miters.

== Description ==
The length of the shell attains 24.9 mm.

== Distribution ==
This marine species occurs in the Indo-West and Central Pacific: off Mauritius and Mozambique, the Philippines and Hawaii; also off Papua New Guinea and Australia (Northern Territory, Queensland, Western Australia).
