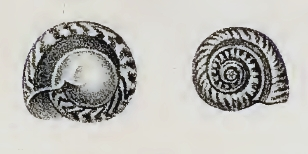
- Drawing with two images of a shell of Monilea smithi

Scientific classification
- Kingdom: Animalia
- Phylum: Mollusca
- Class: Gastropoda
- Subclass: Vetigastropoda
- Order: Trochida
- Superfamily: Trochoidea
- Family: Trochidae
- Genus: Monilea
- Species: M. smithi

Binomial name
- Monilea smithi (Wood, 1828)

Synonyms
- Euchelus smithi Dunker, R.W., 1882; Trochus smithi Wood, 1828

= Monilea smithi =

Species of gastropod

Monilea smithi is a species of sea snail, a marine gastropod mollusk in the family Trochidae, the top snails.

== Description ==
The height of the shell attains 15 mm, its diameter 20 mm. The umbilicate shell has a globose-conic shape. The 6 to 7 whorls are encircled by numerous unequal, grained, partly pearly riblets. The convex base is sculptured with smoother riblets, their interstices cancellated. The umbilicus is deeply channelled. The aperture is rounded-quadrate. The columella is deeply sinuous, callous, terminating in an acute denticle. The outer lip is sulcate within, subcinereus or ashen-reddish, with scattered obscure spots on the upper whorls. The lip is thickened in adults and is silvery-pearly.

== Distribution ==
This marine species occurs off Japan.
