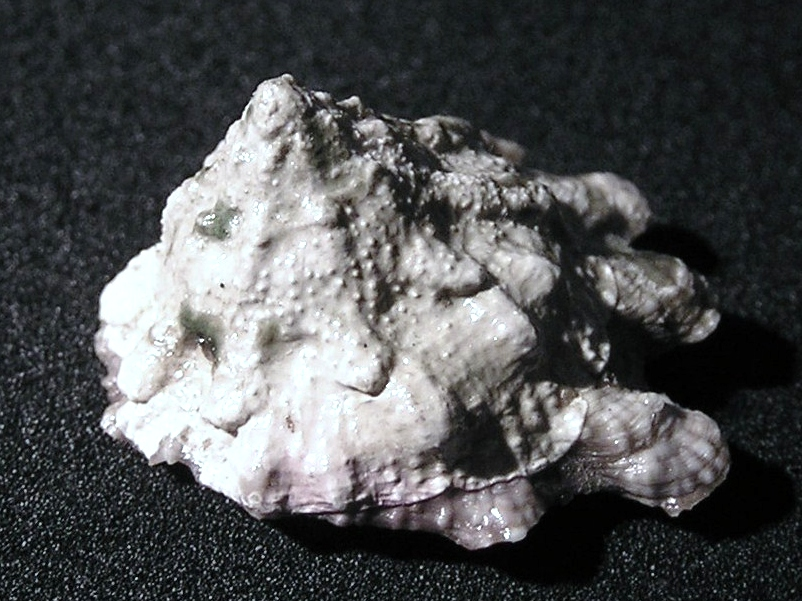
- Abapertural view of a shell of Uvanilla unguis

Scientific classification
- Kingdom: Animalia
- Phylum: Mollusca
- Class: Gastropoda
- Subclass: Vetigastropoda
- Order: Trochida
- Family: Turbinidae
- Genus: Uvanilla
- Species: U. unguis

Binomial name
- Uvanilla unguis (W. Wood, 1828)

Synonyms
- Astraea unguis (Wood, 1828); Astraea (Uvanilla) unguis (Wood, 1828); Astralium unguis Wood, 1828; Trochus unguis W. Wood, 1828; Turbo amictus Valenciennes; Turbo multipes Philippi

= Uvanilla unguis =

Species of gastropod

Uvanilla unguis is a species of sea snail, a marine gastropod mollusk in the family Turbinidae, the turban snails.

== Description ==
The size of the shell varies between 20 mm and 40 mm. The solid, imperforate shell has a conic shape. With a color pattern of brown or gray. The conic spire is acute. The spire contains six whorls. Those above are very obliquely striate and flattened, longitudinally inegularly plicate, sharply carinated at the periphery and produced into radiating compressed truncated digitations. The base of the shell is flat or concave, concentrically regularly and finely lirate, lirae number about seven, radiately densely, finely lamellose-striate. The interior aperture is very oblique, and angular at periphery, its lower margin nearly straight. The interior of the aperture is silvery. The oblique columella is slightly concave, and excavated at the position of the umbilicus, with a spiral white rib. The parietal callus covers over half the base of the shell.

The operculum is white outside, excavated on each side of a strong granulose curved central rib, with the terminations connected by a shorter ridge curved in the opposite direction.

== Distribution ==
This species occurs from the Gulf of California, Western Mexico to Panama
