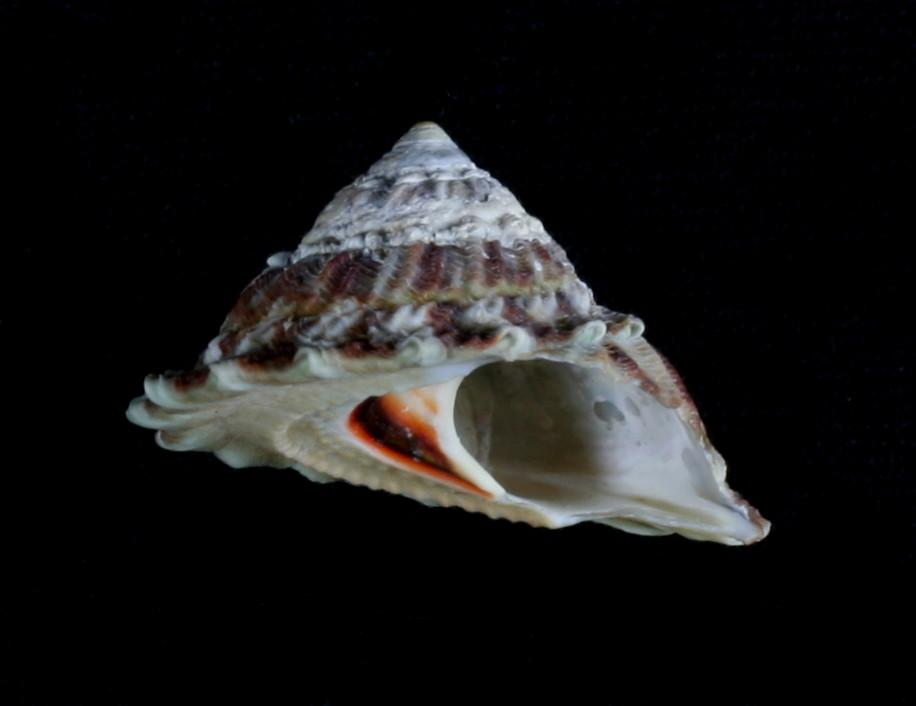
- Shell of Uvanilla olivacea (W. Wood, 1828), measuring 12.8 mm in height by 25.1 mm diameter.

Scientific classification
- Kingdom: Animalia
- Phylum: Mollusca
- Class: Gastropoda
- Subclass: Vetigastropoda
- Order: Trochida
- Family: Turbinidae
- Genus: Uvanilla
- Species: U. olivacea

Binomial name
- Uvanilla olivacea (W. Wood, 1828)

Synonyms
- Astraea olivacea (W. Wood, 1828); Astralium olivaceum W.Wood, 1828 (original description); Turbo brevispinosus Valenciennes; Turbo erythropthalmus Philippi

= Uvanilla olivacea =

Species of gastropod

Uvanilla olivacea, common name the blood-spotted star shell, is a species of sea snail, a marine gastropod mollusk in the family Turbinidae, the turban snails.

== Distribution ==
This species is found from La Paz in the Gulf of California southwards to Oaxaca, in Mexico.

== Description ==
The shell is greenish brown and roughly an equilateral triangle in profile with a slightly wavy thickened edge on the bottom of the whorl and sculpture consisting of fine diagonal spiral ridges. The single most striking feature is a brilliant spot of reddish-orange at the base of the umbilical pit which is bordered by a dark brown to black outer edge. Average height is 55 mm, and average diameter is 65 mm.

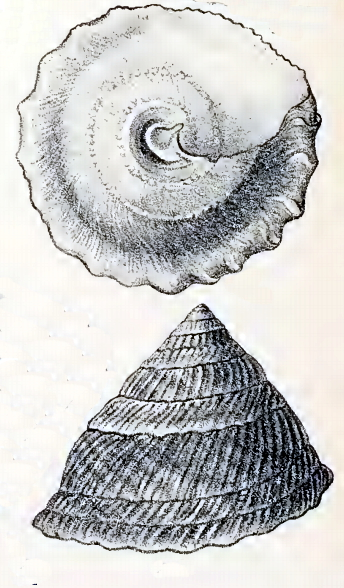
Drawing with two views of a shell of Uvanilla olivacea

The acute, imperforate shell has a conic shape. Its color pattern is olive-green or brownish. The 6–7 whorls are slightly convex, obliquely finely striate, longitudinally finely plicate. The folds stand at right angles to the striae, and are interrupted one-third of the distance from the suture to the periphery by two spiral impressed furrows. The linear suture is undulating. The peripheral carina is slightly nodose. The base of the shell is concave, radiately finely lamellose striate, with a somewhat nodulose rib revolving midway between the periphery and the center. The oblique aperture is silvery white within. it is angled and channelled at its outer side. The base is nearly straight. The arched columella is deeply excavated at the position of the umbilicus. The whole umbilical area is brilliant vermilion, with a black spiral rib.

The oval operculum is black to yellowish inside, with a marginal apex, frequently concealed by growth of the last whorl. Its white outer surface is strongly bicostate.

== Habitat ==
This sea snail is found intertidally and in shallow water offshore in rocky areas.
