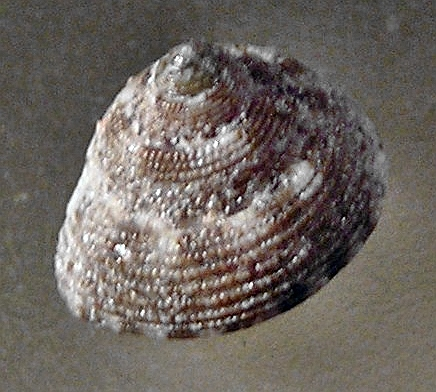
- A shell of Clanculus clangulus

Scientific classification
- Kingdom: Animalia
- Phylum: Mollusca
- Class: Gastropoda
- Subclass: Vetigastropoda
- Order: Trochida
- Superfamily: Trochoidea
- Family: Trochidae
- Genus: Clanculus
- Species: C. clangulus

Binomial name
- Clanculus clangulus (W. Wood, 1828)

Synonyms
- Isoclanculus clangulus Iredale, T. & McMichael, D.F. 1962; Trochus clangulus Wood, 1828

= Clanculus clangulus =

Species of gastropod

Clanculus clangulus is a species of sea snail, a marine gastropod mollusk in the family Trochidae, the top snails.

== Description ==
The size of the shell varies between 10 mm and 13 mm. The shell has a conical shape, with decidedly higher spire generally than Clanculus floridus. It is subcarinate, nearly rounded at the periphery, and very deeply umbilicated. Its color is brownish, or, more frequently a beautiful emerald green, much paler below. The upper surface is broadly radiately maculate with crimson, the flames not extending below the periphery, which, with the base, is dotted with the same shade. The spire is usually attenuated toward the acute rose-colored apex. The about 6 whorls are convex, the last one deflected anteriorly. They are spirally sculptured with about 18 closely granose cinguli, of which 5 to 8 principal ones are above the periphery. Their interstices bear granose riblets, and sharp oblique striae. On old individuals the disparity in the size of the lirae of the upper surface is often scarcely apparent. The base of the shell bears much finer, closer, granulose lirae. The aperture is very oblique and has a subquadrangular form. The outer lip is plicate within. The tooth near the superior angle is slightly developed. Other details of aperture and umbilicus are the same as in Clanculus personatus, save that the parietal area is scarcely wrinkled.

== Distribution ==
This marine species is endemic to Australia and occurs off New South Wales and Queensland.
