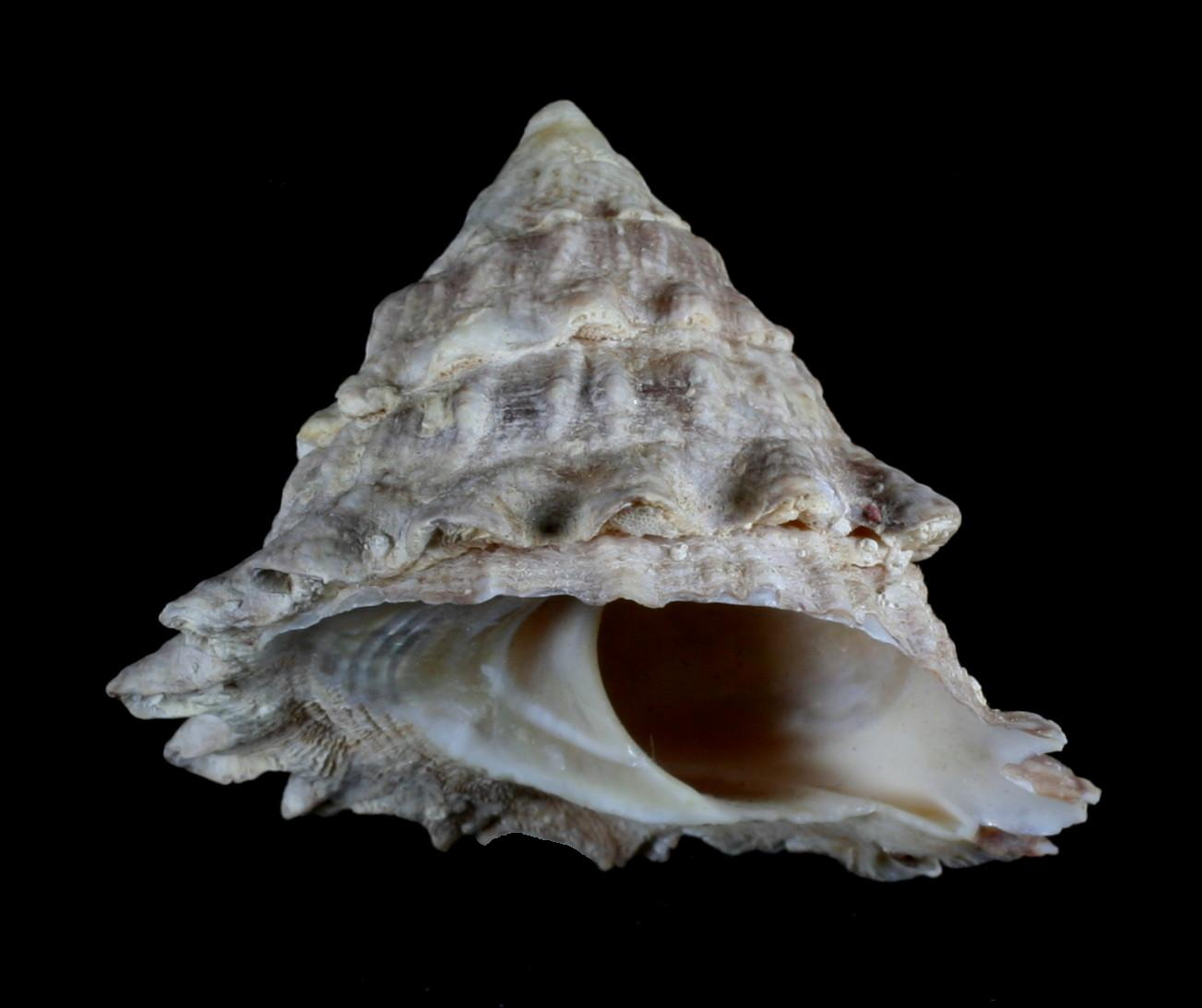
- View of a shell of Uvanilla babelis

Scientific classification
- Kingdom: Animalia
- Phylum: Mollusca
- Class: Gastropoda
- Subclass: Vetigastropoda
- Order: Trochida
- Superfamily: Trochoidea
- Family: Turbinidae
- Genus: Uvanilla; Gray, 1850

Type species
- Uvanilla olivacea (W. Wood, 1828)

Synonyms
- Astraea (Uvanilla)

= Uvanilla =

Genus of gastropods

Uvanilla is a genus of sea snails, marine gastropod mollusks in the family Turbinidae, the turban snails.

== Species ==
Species within the genus Uvanilla include:

- Uvanilla babelis (P. Fischer, 1874)
- Uvanilla buschii (Philippi, 1844)
- Uvanilla olivacea (W. Wood, 1828)
- Uvanilla unguis (W. Wood, 1828)

Species brought into synonymy

- Uvanilla heimburgi Dunker, 1882: synonym of Astralium heimburgi (Dunker, 1882)
