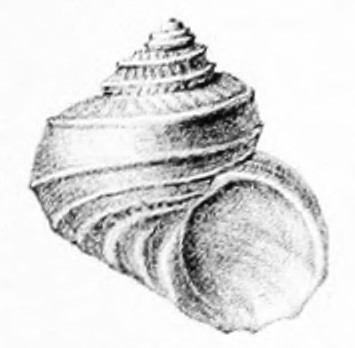
- Original drawing of a shell of Monilea chiliarches

Scientific classification
- Kingdom: Animalia
- Phylum: Mollusca
- Class: Gastropoda
- Subclass: Vetigastropoda
- Order: Trochida
- Superfamily: Trochoidea
- Family: Trochidae
- Genus: Monilea
- Species: M. chiliarches

Binomial name
- Monilea chiliarches Melvill, 1910

= Monilea chiliarches =

Species of gastropod

Monilea chiliarches is a species of sea snail, a marine gastropod mollusk in the family Trochidae, the top snails.

== Description ==
The height of the shell attains 5 mm, its diameter 8 mm. The delicate, turbinate shell is narrowly umbilicate. Its exterior is pale, white-straw but pearly inside. The shell contains 5 bulbous whorls. The apical whorl is vitreous. The others are smooth and have gradual spiral ascent. Three upper whorls (especially the penultimate) show radially sculptured sutures. The two keels are margined accordingly. The penultimate whorl is longitudinally oblique. The body whorl is bicarinate. Between the sutures, the shell is radially obliquely adorned with margined keels. The base of the shell shows five spiral irae. The aperture is round with an iridescent interior.

== Distribution ==
This species occurs in the Persian Gulf and in the central and eastern Indian Ocean.
