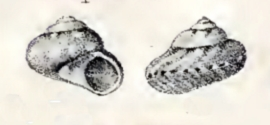
- Drawing with two views of a shell of Monilea lifuana

Scientific classification
- Kingdom: Animalia
- Phylum: Mollusca
- Class: Gastropoda
- Subclass: Vetigastropoda
- Order: Trochida
- Superfamily: Trochoidea
- Family: Trochidae
- Genus: Monilea
- Species: M. lifuana

Binomial name
- Monilea lifuana (P. Fischer, 1878)

Synonyms
- Monilea (Monilea) lifuana (P. Fischer, 1878); Trochus (Monilea) lifuanus P. Fischer, 1878; Trochus lifuanus Fischer, 1878 (original description)

= Monilea lifuana =

Species of gastropod

Monilea lifuana is a species of sea snail, a marine gastropod mollusk in the family Trochidae, the top snails.

== Description ==
The height of the shell attains 11 mm, its diameter 14 mm. The rather thin, perforate shell has a conoid-depressed shape. Its; coloris very variable, whitish-buff or rosy, brown reddish, ornamented with rosy maculations and narrow spiral lines articulated with white. Transversely it is delicately sulcate, the sulci exquisitely decussated by incremental striae. The six whorls are slightly convex, the first buff, the remainder subangulate. The body whorl is dilated, slightly subangular in the middle, convex beneath and very finely decussated. The aperture is subovate and delicately sulcate within . The columella is arcuate. The thick columellar callus is semicircular, yellowish or livid-green, almost covering the umbilicus.

== Distribution ==
This species occurs in the Indian Ocean off Lifou, Loyalty Islands.
