= Monilea carmesina =

Scientific classification
- Kingdom: Animalia
- Phylum: Mollusca
- Class: Gastropoda
- Subclass: Vetigastropoda
- Order: Trochida
- Superfamily: Trochoidea
- Family: Trochidae
- Genus: Monilea
- Species: M. carmesina

Binomial name
- Monilea carmesina (Webster, 1908)

Synonyms
- Monilea carmesina (Webster, 1908); Trochus carmesinus Webster, 1908

Species of gastropod

Monilea carmesina is a species of small sea snail, a marine gastropod mollusc in the family Trochidae, the top snails.
