= Monilea patricia =

Scientific classification
- Kingdom: Animalia
- Phylum: Mollusca
- Class: Gastropoda
- Subclass: Vetigastropoda
- Order: Trochida
- Superfamily: Trochoidea
- Family: Trochidae
- Genus: Monilea
- Species: M. patricia

Binomial name
- Monilea patricia (Philippi, 1851)

Synonyms
- Monilea kalisoma A. Adams, 1853 (?)

Species of gastropod

Monilea patricia is a species of sea snail, a marine gastropod mollusk in the family Trochidae, the top snails.

== Description ==
The height of the shell attains 17 mm, its diameter 20 mm. It is a rather solid, umbilical shell. Its basic color is tan with sole lighter and darker spots on the spiral cords. The inner lip is slightly recurved toward the umbilicus.

== Distribution ==
This species occurs in the Pacific Ocean off Nicaragua and is the only Monilea species off the American continent.
