= Priotrochus iris =

Scientific classification
- Kingdom: Animalia
- Phylum: Mollusca
- Class: Gastropoda
- Subclass: Vetigastropoda
- Order: Trochida
- Family: Trochidae
- Subfamily: Cantharidinae
- Genus: Priotrochus
- Species: P. iris

Binomial name
- Priotrochus iris Herbert, 1988

Species of gastropod

Priotrochus iris is a species of sea snail, a marine gastropod mollusk in the family Trochidae, the top snails.

== Distribution ==
This marine species occurs in the Indian Ocean off Southeast Africa.
