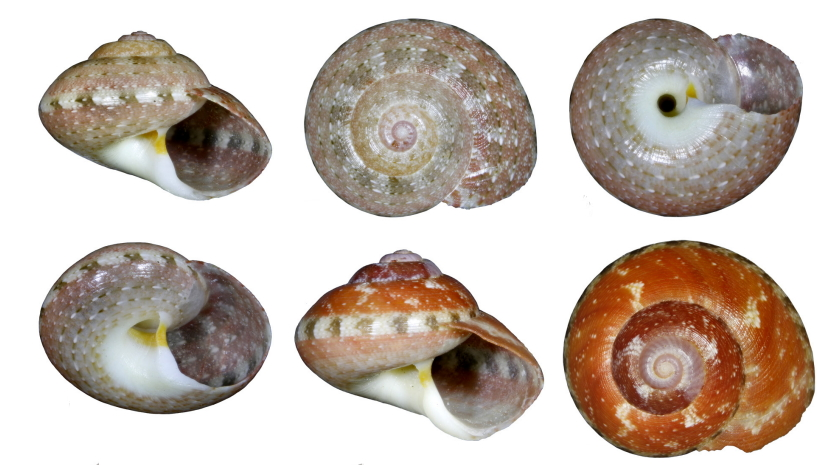
- Shell of Sericominolia safrocincta (holotype)

Scientific classification
- Kingdom: Animalia
- Phylum: Mollusca
- Class: Gastropoda
- Subclass: Vetigastropoda
- Order: Trochida
- Superfamily: Trochoidea
- Family: Trochidae
- Genus: Sericominolia
- Species: S. safrocincta

Binomial name
- Sericominolia safrocincta D. G. Herbert, 2024

= Sericominolia safrocincta =

Species of gastropod

Sericominolia safrocincta is a species of small sea snail, a marine gastropod mollusk in the family Trochidae, the top snails.

== Description ==
(Original description) The shell is thin and of moderate size, with adult specimens reaching a diameter of up to 9.0 mm, and is wider than high (H/D 0.69–0.77). The apex is low and the spire profile is bluntly rounded; the periphery lies below mid‑whorl and is only weakly angled, and the suture is indented but not strongly so. The sculpture is fine and predominantly spiral. The base is rounded and umbilicate, and the teleoconch comprises up to 5.25 whorls.

The first teleoconch whorl bears three narrow spiral lirae, which broaden on the second whorl and increase in number by intercalation of intermediate lirae. Subsequent whorls show low, close‑set spiral lirae separated by narrower, incised striae, the lirae becoming finer just below the suture. Axial sculpture is initially weak and consists only of close‑set microscopic threads; on later whorls it develops into stronger, close‑set collabral growth lines that are most distinct below the suture. Basal sculpture is similar, but the lirae are narrower and the intervals between them wider; the lirae are more numerous around and within the umbilicus. On the base, axial sculpture is weak near the periphery but strengthens medially to form fine, close‑set pliculae encircling the umbilicus. The umbilical rim is rounded and steep‑sided within, lacking a funicle or at most bearing a very low one, and above it lies a shallow sulcus marking the insertion onto the preceding whorl.

The aperture is obliquely quadrate, and the peristome is interrupted across the parietal region. The columellar lip is thickened and microscopically granular where the umbilical rim terminates, and is weakly reflected at the end of the umbilical funicle when this is present. The outer lip is simple, and the interior is smooth and weakly nacreous.

The colour pattern is variable. Specimens are usually finely mottled in shades of pale apricot, pink, or olive green, with fine capillary lines that are dotted with alternating opaque white and olive‑green flecks. The periphery typically bears a broad whitish band with olive‑green blotches. The peri‑umbilical region is white, while the interior of the umbilicus shows a broad saffron‑yellow band. Some shells are more distinctly banded or blotched, and others are more uniformly coloured in pink to orange‑red hues (Fig. 32G). The protoconch is usually whitish. The holotype is 5.5 mm high and 7.5 mm in diameter, and the largest specimen attains a diameter of 9.0 mm. The protoconch is as in S. lifuana, with a diameter of 190–200 µm.

== Distribution ==
This marine species occurs off New Caledonia.
