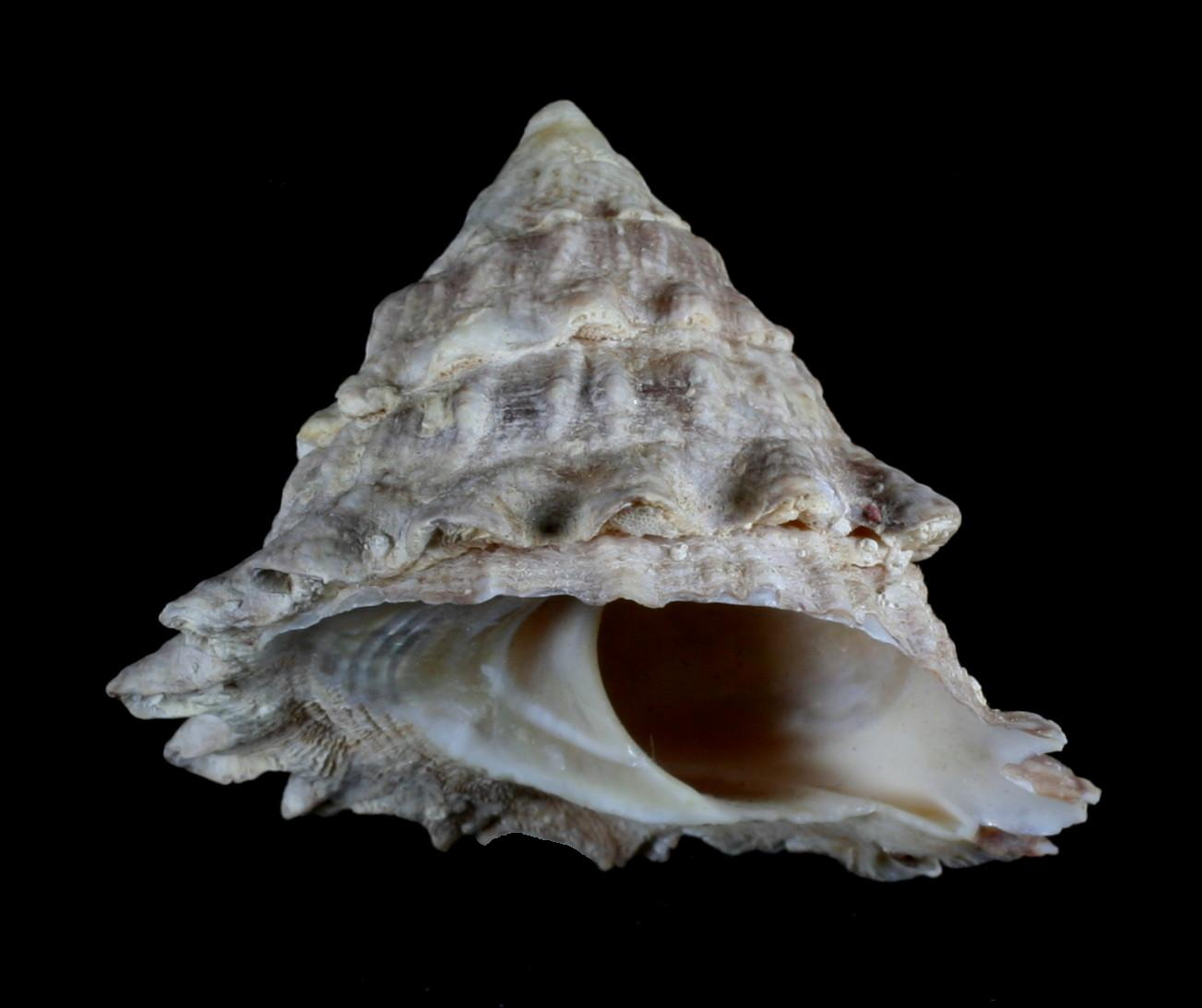
- Shell of Uvanilla babelis (P. Fischer, 1874), measuring 36.1 mm in height by 43.1 mm diameter.

Scientific classification
- Kingdom: Animalia
- Phylum: Mollusca
- Class: Gastropoda
- Subclass: Vetigastropoda
- Order: Trochida
- Family: Turbinidae
- Genus: Uvanilla
- Species: U. babelis

Binomial name
- Uvanilla babelis (P. Fischer, 1874)

Synonyms
- Astraea babelis (P. Fischer, 1874); Astraea (Uvanilla) babelis (P. Fischer, 1874); Astralium babelis P. Fischer, 1874 (original description)

= Uvanilla babelis =

Species of gastropod

Uvanilla babelis is a species of sea snail, a marine gastropod mollusk in the family Turbinidae, the turban snails.

== Description ==
The shell attains a height of 21 mm, its diameter 19 mm. The imperforate, elevated shell has a conic shape with an acute apex. Its color pattern is pale yellowish. The seven whorls are slightly convex, obliquely radiately costate with distant folds, which are prominently nodulose at the sutures and periphery. The interstices are smooth. The body whorl is carinated, the carina bearing about eight nodules. The flat base of the shell is smooth, with fine oblique incremental striae. The aperture angulated. The columellar region is white, blue margined, and unidentate at its base.

== Distribution ==
This species occurs in the Pacific Ocean off South America
