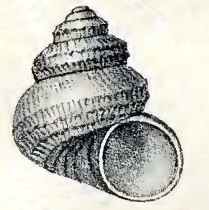
- Drawing of a shell of Monilea pantanellii

Scientific classification
- Kingdom: Animalia
- Phylum: Mollusca
- Class: Gastropoda
- Subclass: Vetigastropoda
- Order: Trochida
- Superfamily: Trochoidea
- Family: Trochidae
- Genus: Monilea
- Species: M. pantanellii

Binomial name
- Monilea pantanellii (Caramagna, 1888)

Synonyms
- Gibbula pantanellii Caramagna, 1888 (original description); Minolia pantanelli (Caramagna, 1888)

= Monilea pantanellii =

Species of sea snail

Monilea pantanellii is a species of sea snail, a marine gastropod mollusk in the family Trochidae, the top snails.

== Description ==
The height of the shell attains 3 mm, its diameter 2½ mm. The turbinate, rather solid, red shell is umbilicate. The five whorls are sloping and angular. The first two whorls are smooth and scarcely visible, the rest ornamented with oblique lamellar minute striae and tuberculate cinguli. Beneath they are ornamented with three granulose whitish concentric cinguli, the upper two near each other, the third more distant, surrounding the umbilicus. The suture is nearly covered. The umbilicus is profound, funnel-shaped, and crenate. The simple peristome is continuous. The whitish aperture is subrotund.

== Distribution ==
This species occurs in the Red Sea off Assab, Erithrea.
