= Priotrochus aniesae =

Scientific classification
- Kingdom: Animalia
- Phylum: Mollusca
- Class: Gastropoda
- Subclass: Vetigastropoda
- Order: Trochida
- Family: Trochidae
- Subfamily: Cantharidinae
- Genus: Priotrochus
- Species: P. aniesae

Binomial name
- Priotrochus aniesae Moolenbeek & Dekker, 1992

Species of gastropod

Priotrochus aniesae is a species of sea snail, a marine gastropod mollusk in the family Trochidae, the top-snails.

== Distribution ==
This marine species occurs in the mud flats on the east coast of Masirah Island, off Oman.
