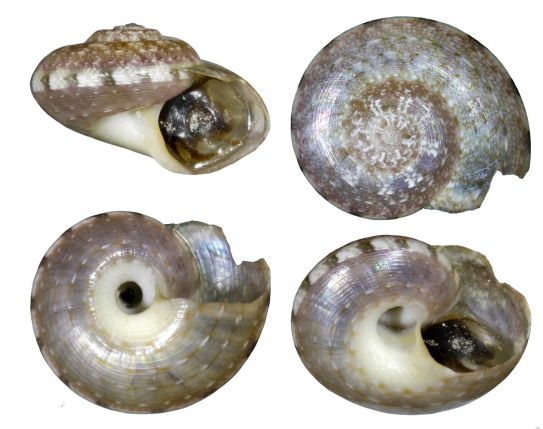
- Shell of Sericominolia porcata (holotype)

Scientific classification
- Kingdom: Animalia
- Phylum: Mollusca
- Class: Gastropoda
- Subclass: Vetigastropoda
- Order: Trochida
- Superfamily: Trochoidea
- Family: Trochidae
- Genus: Sericominolia
- Species: S. porcata

Binomial name
- Sericominolia porcata D. G. Herbert, 2024

= Sericominolia porcata =

Species of gastropod

Sericominolia porcata is a species of small sea snail, a marine gastropod mollusk in the family Trochidae, the top snails.

== Description ==
(Original description) The shell is thin and small, with the largest specimen reaching a diameter of 5.6 mm, and is wider than high (H/D about 0.64). The spire is low with a distinctly stepped profile, and the periphery lies at mid‑whorl, where it is rounded or only weakly angled. The spire whorls are distinctly shouldered. Sculpture is fine and predominantly spiral. The base is shallowly rounded and bears a moderately broad umbilicus. The teleoconch comprises up to 4.25 whorls.

The first teleoconch whorl carries three crisp spiral lirae, and broad, widely spaced axial ridges develop toward the end of this whorl. The middle lira is the strongest and forms the shoulder at the start of the second whorl. Thereafter, the spiral lirae become more numerous and the axial ridges stronger, giving the shoulder an undulating aspect. The whorls are flattened above the shoulder and flat‑sided or weakly concave below it. The axial ridges fade during the third whorl and the shoulder becomes more rounded. Later whorls are more evenly rounded, with sculpture of low, close‑set spiral lirae that are finer just below the suture. Axial sculpture, in addition to the ridges, initially consists of weak, close‑set microscopic threads only; on later whorls it comprises fine, regular, close‑set collabral pliculae together with stronger, more widely spaced growth lines. Basal sculpture consists of broad, flat‑topped spiral lirae separated by narrow incised striae, with axial pliculae much less distinct; the lirae are more closely set within the umbilicus. The umbilical rim is rounded and slightly thickened, and is at most weakly crenulated by the growth lines; the umbilicus is steep‑sided within and lacks a discernible funicle.

The aperture is roundly quadrate, and the peristome is interrupted across the parietal region. The columellar lip is thickened where the umbilical rim terminates, its surface being microscopically granular. The outer lip is simple, and the interior is smooth and weakly nacreous.

The colour pattern consists of white‑flecked spiral capillary lines on a translucent ground that is pale greyish, pinkish brown, or greenish, with a pinkish iridescence. The shoulder of the spire whorls shows radiating white lines, often in pairs. The umbilicus is white; in the holotype there is a trace of a yellowish band within the umbilicus. The protoconch is white. The holotype measures 3.6 mm in height and 5.6 mm in diameter and is the largest specimen examined. The protoconch (Fig. 30B) is as in S. lifuana, with a diameter of about 170 µm, and the operculum is likewise as in S. lifuana.

== Distribution ==
This marine species occurs off the Loyalty Islands.
