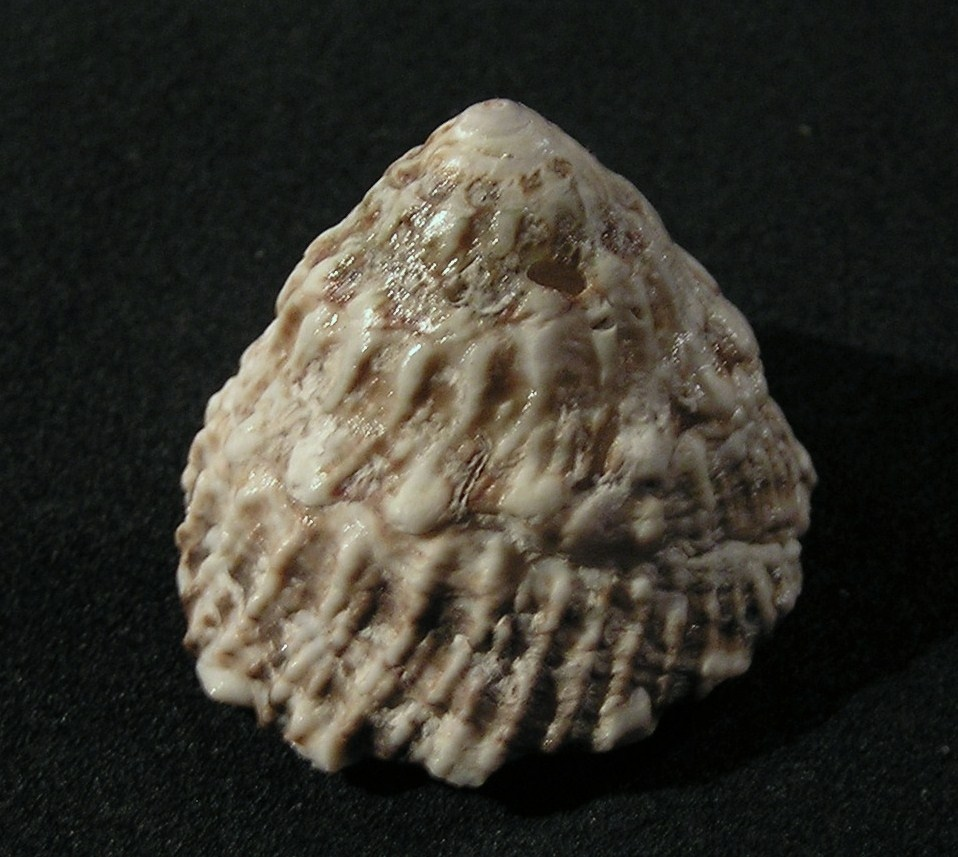
- Abapertural view of a shell of Uvanilla buschii

Scientific classification
- Kingdom: Animalia
- Phylum: Mollusca
- Class: Gastropoda
- Subclass: Vetigastropoda
- Order: Trochida
- Family: Turbinidae
- Genus: Uvanilla
- Species: U. buschii

Binomial name
- Uvanilla buschii (Philippi, 1844)

Synonyms
- Astraea buschii (Philippi, 1844); Astraea (Uvanilla) buschii (Philippi, 1844); Astralium buschii Philippi, 1844 (original description)

= Uvanilla buschii =

Species of gastropod

Uvanilla buschii, common name Busch's star shell, is a species of sea snail, a marine gastropod mollusk in the family Turbinidae, the turban snails.

== Description ==
The shell attains a size between 17 mm and 60 mm. The solid, imperforate shell has a conic shape. Its color pattern is olivaceous brown, maculated obscurely above with brown, green or white. The seven whorls are longitudinally costate below the sutures and above the periphery, with two spiral series of tubercles around the middle of the flattened upper surface, or sometimes finely irregularly plicate over the whole upper surface. The periphery is acutely carinated, bearing numerous short compressed triangular radiating spines. The flat base of the shell is densely radiately lamellose-striate, with a strong rib revolving midway between the periphery and the center The aperture is oblique, pearly white within, transversely ovate, deeply channelled at the periphery. The columellar region is white, strongly bicostate, deeply excavated at the position of the umbilicus. The parietal callus is not much extended.

The operculum is oblong with a submarginal nucleus. The outer surface is white, with a strong curved central rib, its terminations joined by a A-shaped ridge.

== Distribution ==
This species occurs in the Pacific Ocean from Mexico to Peru.
