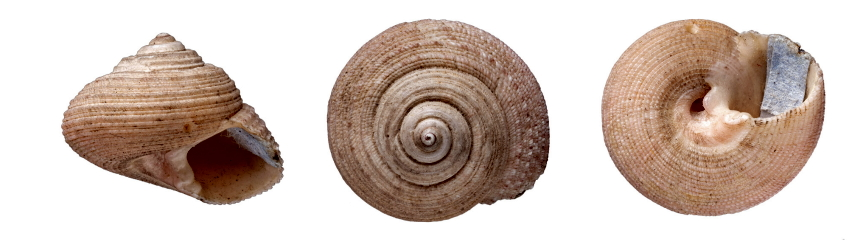
- Shell of Talopena menkei (specimens in the Natural History Museum, London)

Scientific classification
- Kingdom: Animalia
- Phylum: Mollusca
- Class: Gastropoda
- Subclass: Vetigastropoda
- Order: Trochida
- Superfamily: Trochoidea
- Family: Trochidae
- Genus: Talopena
- Species: T. menkei

Binomial name
- Talopena menkei (A. Adams, 1855)

Synonyms
- Monilea menkei A. Adams, 1855 superseded combination

= Talopena menkei =

Species of gastropod

Talopena menkei is a species of sea snail, a marine gastropod mollusk in the family Trochidae, the top snails.

== Description ==
(Original description in Latin) The shell is orbicular‑conoidal and umbilicate, and is a dull or dirty white in colour. The whorls are somewhat convex; the upper whorls are crossed by transverse lirae, and their interspaces are marked by longitudinal, rugose reticulations. The lower whorls are encircled by closely set granular cords, some of the granules being enlarged and more prominent.

The margin of the umbilicus is surrounded by a fleshy‑coloured, spiral, striate callus. The columella is sinuate in its middle portion and bears a reflected callus, and anteriorly it carries two small tubercles. The inner face of the outer lip is smooth.

Talopena menkei has a more obviously beaded sculpture with less angular primary spiral cords and more distinct secondary cords in their intervals, and finer more numerous cords on the base than Thalopena masoni.

== Distribution ==
This marine species occurs off the Philippines.
