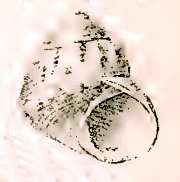
- Drawing of a shell of Priotrochus obscurus

Scientific classification
- Kingdom: Animalia
- Phylum: Mollusca
- Class: Gastropoda
- Subclass: Vetigastropoda
- Order: Trochida
- Family: Trochidae
- Subfamily: Cantharidinae
- Genus: Priotrochus
- Species: P. obscurus

Binomial name
- Priotrochus obscurus (W. Wood, 1828)

Synonyms
- Monilea obscura (Wood, 1828); Monilea (Priotrochus) obscura (Wood, 1828); Monodonta obscura (Wood, 1828); Priotrochus sepulchralis Melvill, J.C., 1899; Trochus lineolatus Bianconi, J.J., 1865; Trochus nabateus Issel, A., 1869; Trochus obscurus Wood, 1828 (basionym); Trochus (Aphanotrochus) obscurus Wood, 1828; Trochus (Priotrochus) obscurus Wood, 1828; Trochus signatus Jonas, J.H., 1844

= Priotrochus obscurus =

Species of gastropod

Priotrochus obscurus is a species of sea snail, a marine gastropod mollusk in the family Trochidae, the top snails.

Subspecies

- Priotrochus obscurus obscurus (Wood, 1828) (synonyms: Gibbula (Priotrochus) sepulchralis (Melvill, 1899); Gibbula sepulchralis (Melvill, 1899); Priotrochus sepulchralis Melvill, 1899; Trochus nabateus Issel, 1869; Trochus signatus Jonas, 1844)
- † Priotrochus obscurus ponsonbyi (G. B. Sowerby, 1888) (synonyms: Monilea (Priotrochus) ponsonbyi (G. B. Sowerby, 1888); Monilea obscura ponsonbyi (G.B. Sowerby, 1888); Monilea ponsonbyi (G.B. Sowerby, 1888); Priotrochus alexandri Tomlin, 1926; Trochus (Gibbula) ponsonbyi G. B. Sowerby, 1888; Trochus ponsonbyi G.B. Sowerby, 1888)

== Description ==
The shell size varies between 7 mm and 20 mm. The very solid, thick, narrowly perforated shell has a conical shape and is elevated. It is ashen-white, with longitudinal chestnut streaks or maculations. The spire is elevated. The apex is acute. The sutures are slightly impressed, the whorl below them closely appressed. The shell contains 6 to 7 whorls. The upper ones are subangular and nodulose in the middle. The body whorl shows a coronal series of knobs, on large specimens becoming obsolete toward the aperture. The entire surface is traversed by spiral lirulae, much narrower than the densely obliquely striate interstices. The oblique, ovate aperture is about half the length of shell. The outer lip is bevelled to an edge. The aperture is spirally lirate. The edge of the columella is denticulate. Its upper insertion is callous, partly or nearly covering the umbilicus. Young specimens are subbiangulate with nodulose periphery.

== Distribution ==
This species is distributed in the Red Sea and in the Indian Ocean off Madagascar, Mozambique, Tanzania and Durban, South Africa.
