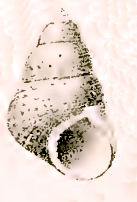
- Priotrochus goudoti

Scientific classification
- Kingdom: Animalia
- Phylum: Mollusca
- Class: Gastropoda
- Subclass: Vetigastropoda
- Order: Trochida
- Superfamily: Trochoidea
- Family: Trochidae
- Subfamily: Cantharidinae
- Genus: Priotrochus; P. Fischer, 1879

Type species
- Trochus obscurus Wood, 1828

Synonyms
- Gibbula (Priotrochus) Fischer, 1880; Monilea (Priotrochus) Fischer, 1880; Trochus (Aphanotrochus) Martens, 1880; Trochus (Priotrochus) Fischer, 1880

= Priotrochus =

Genus of gastropods

Priotrochus is a genus of sea snails, marine gastropod mollusks in the subfamily Cantharidinae of the family Trochidae, the top snails.

== Description ==
The shell has an elevated-conic shape. The columella is crenulate, not toothed. The umbilicus is narrow without spiral funicle.

== Species ==
Species within the genus Priotrochus include:

- Priotrochus aniesae Moolenbeek & Dekker, 1992
- Priotrochus goudoti (Fischer, 1878)
- Priotrochus iris Herbert, 1988
- Priotrochus obscurus (W. Wood, 1828)

Species brought into synonymy

- Priotrochus alexandri Tomlin, 1926: synonym of Priotrochus obscurus ponsonbyi (G. B. Sowerby, 1888)
- Priotrochus chrysolaemus (Martens, 1880): synonym of Priotrochus goudoti (Fischer, 1878)
- Priotrochus incertus Schepman, 1908: synonym of Tibatrochus incertus (Schepman, 1908)
- Priotrochus kotschyi (Philippi, 1849): synonym of Trochus kotschyi Philippi, 1849
- Priotrochus sepulchralis Melvill, 1899: synonym of Priotrochus obscurus obscurus (Wood, 1828)
