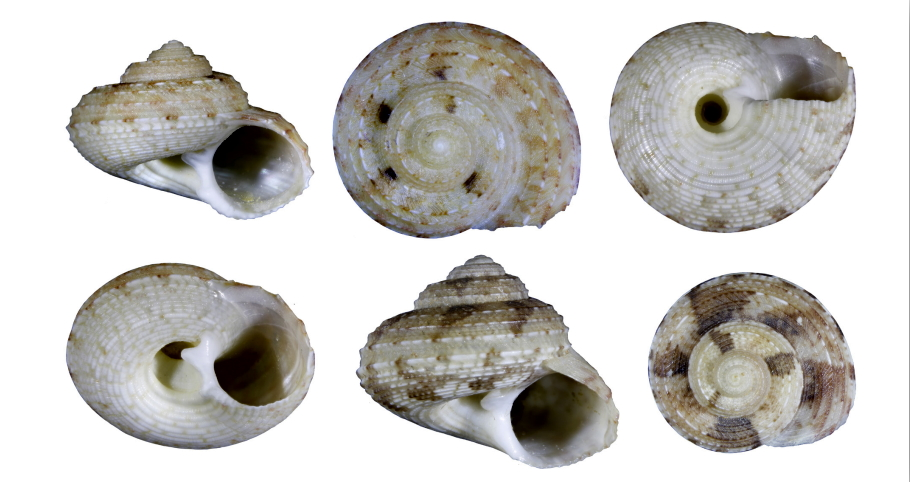
- Shells of Talopena tramieri

Scientific classification
- Kingdom: Animalia
- Phylum: Mollusca
- Class: Gastropoda
- Subclass: Vetigastropoda
- Order: Trochida
- Superfamily: Trochoidea
- Family: Trochidae
- Genus: Talopena
- Species: T. tramieri

Binomial name
- Talopena tramieri (Poppe, Tagaro & H. Dekker, 2006)

Synonyms
- Pseudominolia tramieri Poppe, Tagaro & H. Dekker, 2006 superseded combination

= Talopena tramieri =

Species of gastropod

Talopena tramieri is a species of sea snail, a marine gastropod mollusk in the family Trochidae, the top snails.

== Description ==
The length of the shell attains 7.3 mm, its diameter 9 mm.

The shell is of moderate size, with the largest specimens measuring 8–10 mm in diameter. The spire whorls carry four to five primary spiral cords, some intervals bearing a weaker intermediary cord, and these are crossed by numerous fine, close‑set, strongly prosocline axial threads. In addition, microscopic spiral lirae occur between the primary cords and interact with the axial threads to produce a fine, microgranular sculpture, which is more evident in some specimens than in others. The base shows finer, more closely set spiral sculpture.

The umbilicus is of moderate width and is distinctive in having a strong, deep‑set, relatively narrow spiral funicle that terminates as a strong, tongue‑shaped projection one quarter to one third of the way down the columella. A deep, narrow channel separates this funicle from the base of the preceding whorl. A second, weaker funicle lies just within the rim of the umbilicus and ends as a more rounded projection near the base of the columella.

The colour pattern is variable. The shell is usually pale and variously mottled with shades of yellow‑ochre, with darker orange‑yellow to brown blotches, particularly below the suture; parts of the shell may show a pinkish‑orange wash, and the spiral cords are commonly flecked with white. The base is paler and less boldly patterned. The umbilicus is whitish, and the upper funicle appears never to be pigmented.

The protoconch is typically umboniine, with a diameter of about 190 µm. An apical beak is present and confluent with the terminal lip. The apical bulb is sculptured with an irregular, open network of threads, and the remainder shows traces of subspiral threads; the terminal lip is weakly convex. The operculum is corneous and multispiral, with relatively narrow whorls separated by a well‑defined groove. The peripheral fringe bears faint radial striation, and spiral microsculpture is absent.

The radula has the formula ∞+(1)+5+1+5+(1)+∞ and comprises approximately 45 transverse rows of teeth. The teeth of the central field are reduced. The rachidian base‑plate is broad and roundly quadrate, with its anterior edge recurved and bearing a vestige of a shaft in the centre. The base‑plates of the inner lateral teeth are expanded and bluntly rounded basally, with the outer anterior edge somewhat raised, while the outer laterals are more nearly quadrate.

The innermost marginal tooth is transitional, with a reduced shaft and cusp and a shouldered medial face. The remaining marginal teeth are well developed, with a narrow shaft and a strongly recurved cusp. In the inner marginal teeth, the cusp carries a large, bluntly lanceolate central denticle, which bears a small pointed denticle at its outer base and an even smaller, more slender denticle at its inner base, the latter usually obscured by overlapping teeth. Marginals 3–10 have the largest cusps; beyond these, the cusps diminish progressively in size, and the outermost ones have finely pectinate margins.

External anatomy (from rehydrated specimens) shows only limited detail: The eyestalks are well developed, with expanded tips that contain large black eyes. The left neck‑lobe is digitate, its digits perhaps branched, whereas the right neck‑lobe is well developed, with an entire margin rolled to form an exhalant siphon. There are four micropapillate epipodial tentacles on the left side, and a similar number is presumed on the right. The epipodium and sides of the foot are densely speckled with pale pigmentation. The ctenidium appears to be bipectinate, with its tip free.

== Distribution ==
This marine species occurs off the Philippines and New Caledonia.
