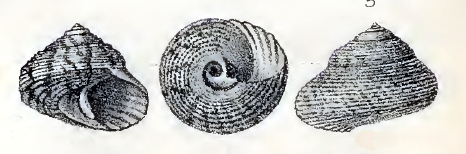
- Drawing with three views of a shell of Monilea lentiginosa

Scientific classification
- Kingdom: Animalia
- Phylum: Mollusca
- Class: Gastropoda
- Subclass: Vetigastropoda
- Order: Trochida
- Superfamily: Trochoidea
- Family: Trochidae
- Genus: Monilea
- Species: M. lentiginosa

Binomial name
- Monilea lentiginosa (A. Adams, 1851)

Synonyms
- Monilea corrugata A. Adams, 1854; Monilea morti (Iredale, 1929); Trochus lentiginosus Fischer

= Monilea lentiginosa =

Species of gastropod

Monilea lentiginosa is a species of sea snail, a marine gastropod mollusk in the family Trochidae, the top snails.

The Australian Faunal Directory considers Monilea lentiginosa Adams, 1853 to be a synonym of Monilea callifera (Lamarck, 1822)

== Description ==
The size of the shell varies between 12 mm and 24 mm. The umbilicate, very solid shell has a conical shape. It is lusterless with a whitish color, unicolored or obscurely striped or maculate with brown or buff. The spire is conical with an acute apex. The sutures are impressed. The 6 to 7 whorls are convex, the last with a tendency to be flattened around the middle. The entire surface is covered with sharp close uneven spiral riblets with deeply incised interstices, and very fine, close, longitudinal growth lamellae, forming compressed beads on the lirae, and generally lamellae in the interstices. The oblique aperture is rounded-quadrangular, with 10 or 11 plicae within, which attain the edge of the lip. The short columella is toothed below, concave and somewhat expanded above. The umbilicus contains within a smooth, not very prominent, funicle.

== Distribution ==
This marine species occurs in the Central Indo-West Pacific and Australia ( Queensland - New South Wales)
