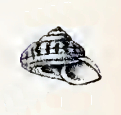
- Drawing of a shell of Antisolarium egenum

Scientific classification
- Kingdom: Animalia
- Phylum: Mollusca
- Class: Gastropoda
- Subclass: Vetigastropoda
- Order: Trochida
- Superfamily: Trochoidea
- Family: Trochidae
- Genus: Antisolarium; Finlay, 1926

= Antisolarium =

Genus of gastropods

Antisolarium is a genus of sea snails, marine gastropod molluscs in the family Trochidae, the top shells.

== Species ==
Species within the genus Antisolarium include:

- Antisolarium egenum (A. A. Gould, 1849)

Species brought into synonymy

- Antisolarium vixincisum Marwick, 1929: synonym of Conominolia vixincisa (Marwick, 1929)
