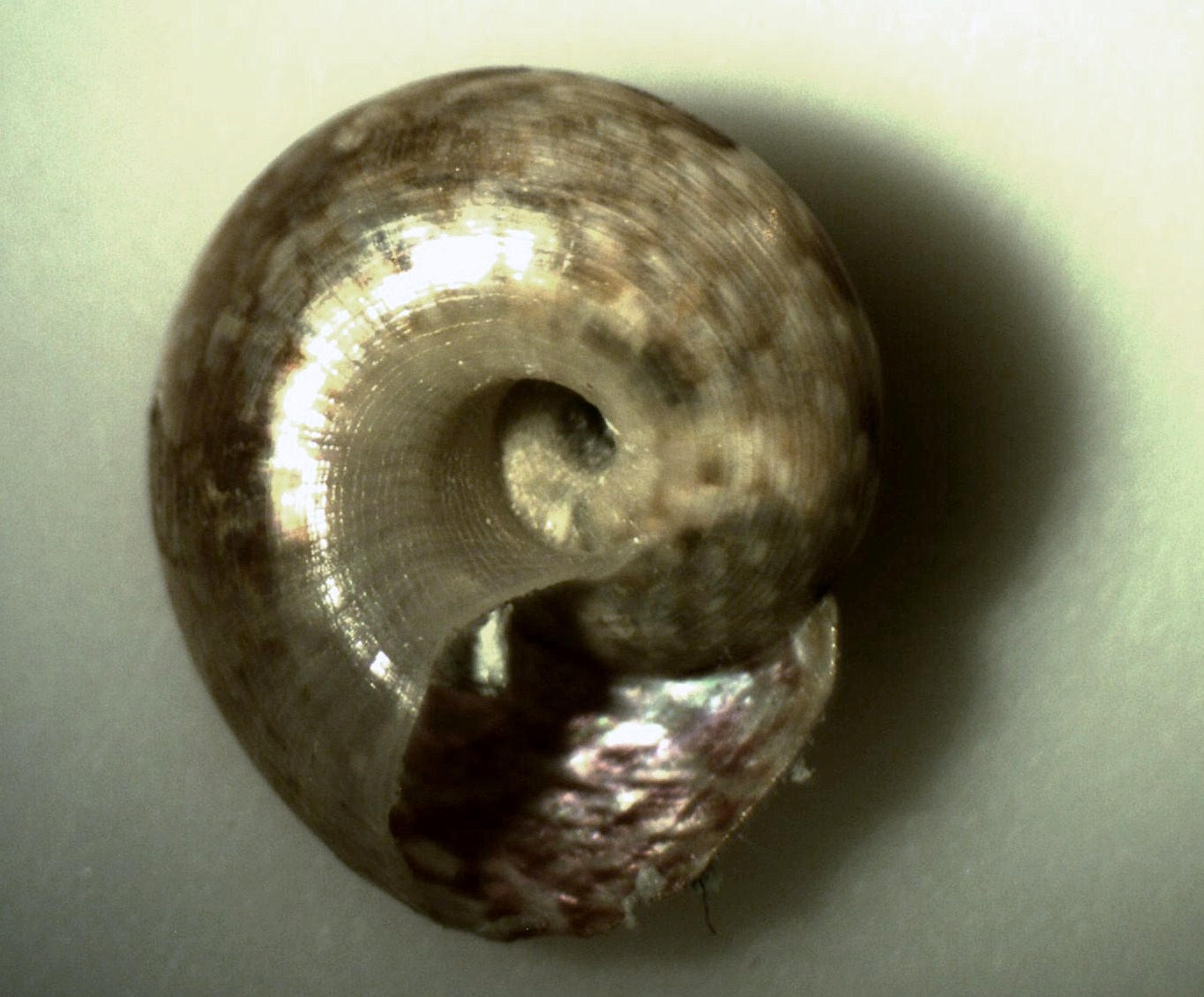
- Apertural view of a shell of Sericominolia vernicosa

Scientific classification
- Kingdom: Animalia
- Phylum: Mollusca
- Class: Gastropoda
- Subclass: Vetigastropoda
- Order: Trochida
- Superfamily: Trochoidea
- Family: Trochidae
- Genus: Sericominolia; Kuroda & Habe, 1954

Type species
- Minolia stearnsii Pilsbry, 1895

Synonyms
- Ethminolia (Sericominolia) Kuroda & T. Habe, 1954 superseded rank

= Sericominolia =

Genus of gastropods

Sericominolia is a genus of sea snails, marine gastropod mollusks in the family Trochidae, the top snails.

== General characteristics ==
The shell is relatively thin and of moderate size, with a depressed turbiniform to trochoid‑turbiniform profile, reaching a diameter of up to 14.0 mm. The whorls are rounded or only weakly shouldered, with the periphery situated at or below mid‑whorl and the base comparatively flat. The sculpture is fine and consists of close‑set spiral lirae together with microscopic axial pliculae. The umbilicus is open and has a thickened rim, usually (though not invariably) bearing a distinct internal funicle that terminates in a reflected callus on the columellar lip, often in a contrasting colour. The outer lip is simple, and the interior is smooth.

The operculum is corneous, relatively thick, and multispiral, though not tightly coiled; the whorl overlap is narrow and the peripheral fringe is also narrow, and there is no spiral microsculpture. The radula has relatively robust base‑plates on both the rachidian and lateral teeth; the inner marginal tooth is transitional, with a reduced cusp. Among the marginal teeth, cusps 3–10 are the largest and carry a broad, bluntly lanceolate central denticle that bears one to two smaller denticles at its outer base. The ctenidium is bipectinate, with the anterior portion remaining unattached.

== Species ==
Species within the genus Sericominolia include:

- Sericominolia gloriola (Iredale, 1929)
- Sericominolia lifuana (P. Fischer, 1878)
- Sericominolia porcata D. G. Herbert, 2024
- Sericominolia safrocincta D. G. Herbert, 2024
- Sericominolia stearnsii (Pilsbry, 1895)
- Sericominolia vernicosa (Gould, 1861)

Species brought into synonymy

- Sericominolia glaphyrella Williams et al. 2024: 6.: synonym of Kanakina glaphyrella (Melvill & Standen, 1895)
- Sericominolia stearnsii (Pilsbry, 1895): synonym of Ethminolia stearnsii (Pilsbry, 1895)
