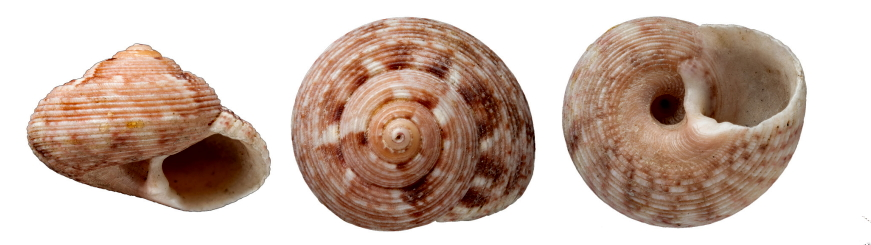
- Shell of Talopena calyculus (syntype)

Scientific classification
- Kingdom: Animalia
- Phylum: Mollusca
- Class: Gastropoda
- Subclass: Vetigastropoda
- Order: Trochida
- Superfamily: Trochoidea
- Family: Trochidae
- Genus: Talopena
- Species: T. calyculus

Binomial name
- Talopena calyculus (W. Wood, 1828)

Synonyms
- Monilea calyculus (W. Wood, 1828) superseded combination; Trochus (Monilea) calyculus W. Wood, 1828 superseded combination; Trochus calyculus W. Wood, 1828 superseded combination

= Talopena calyculus =

Species of gastropod

Talopena calyculus is a species of sea snail, a marine gastropod mollusk in the family Trochidae, the top snails.

== Description ==
A syntype of Talopena calyculus has a diameter of 17.1 mm.

Talopena calyculus is of similar size to Talopena maestratii but is more depressed, has weaker, less angular spiral cords, stronger axial sculpture between the cords, and a less prominent umbilical funicle with almost no reflection at the columellar lip.

== Distribution ==
This marine species occurs off India, Sri Lanka, Indonesia, the Philippines, Japan and Australia.
