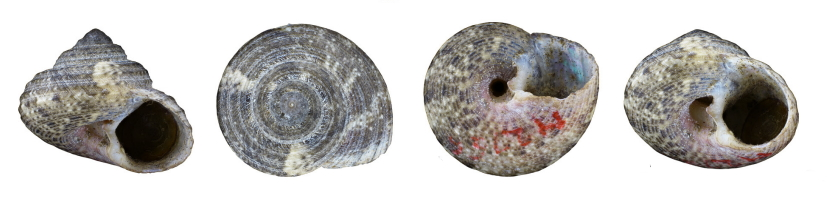
- shell of Talopena incerta

Conservation status
- Naturally Uncommon (NZ TCS)

Scientific classification
- Kingdom: Animalia
- Phylum: Mollusca
- Class: Gastropoda
- Subclass: Vetigastropoda
- Order: Trochida
- Superfamily: Trochoidea
- Family: Trochidae
- Genus: Talopena
- Species: T. incerta

Binomial name
- Talopena incerta (Iredale, 1912)

Synonyms
- Monilea incerta Iredale, 1912 superseded combination

= Talopena incerta =

Species of gastropod

Talopena incerta is a species of sea snail, a marine gastropod mollusk in the family Trochidae, the top snails.

== Description ==
The height of the shell attains 10 mm, its diameter 9 mm. The thin, small, umbilicate shell has a turbinate shape. The convex whorls increase gradually. They are slightly flattened below the suture. The body whorl is rounded at the periphery. The colour of the shell is generally blackish-grey, irregularly rayed with white. The shell contains six whorls six. The first one and a half whorl is minute and unsculptured. The sculpture consists of spiral threads increasing in number and strength. The penultimate whorl has three major threads, the last five above the periphery. Between these run from one to three minor threads. The whole shell is overridden by very fine axial striae. The base is sculptured with about twelve even-spaced ridges, similarly overridden. The umbilicus is narrow, bounded by a thickened rib, only developed in the adult; inside white. The aperture is subquadrate. The outer lip is thin. The columella ascends with a faint reflection, and higher again reflected, when a rib enters the umbilicus. It is connected with the outer lip by a slight callus. The operculum is circular, and multispiral. Its nucleus is central, thin and horny.

== Distribution ==
This marine species occurs off the Kermadec Islands.
