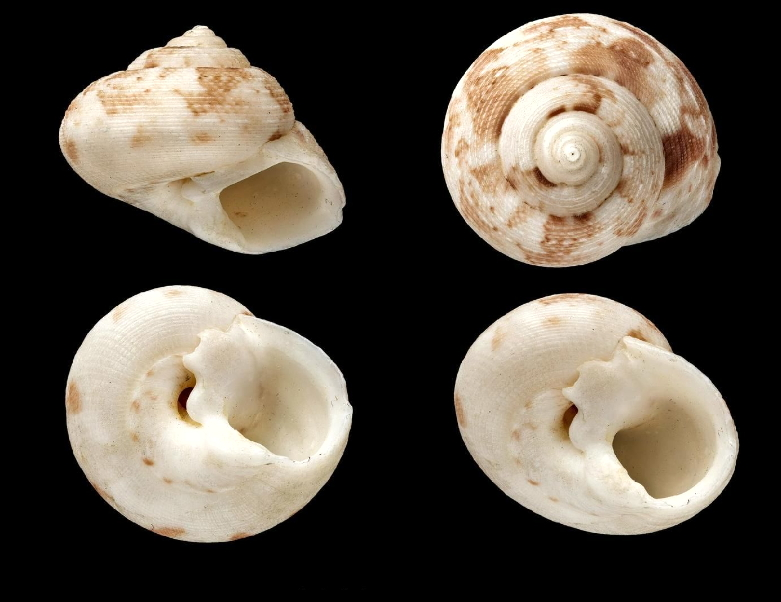
- Shell of Talopena philippii (specimens in the Natural History Museum, London)

Scientific classification
- Kingdom: Animalia
- Phylum: Mollusca
- Class: Gastropoda
- Subclass: Vetigastropoda
- Order: Trochida
- Superfamily: Trochoidea
- Family: Trochidae
- Genus: Talopena
- Species: T. philippii

Binomial name
- Talopena philippii ( A. Adams, 1855)

Synonyms
- Ethalia philippii (A. Adams, 1855); Monilea philippii A. Adams, 1855 superseded combination

= Talopena philippii =

Species of gastropod

Talopena philippii is a species of sea snail, a marine gastropod mollusk in the family Trochidae, the top snails.

== Description ==
The rather solid, umbilical shell has an orbiculate-conoidal shape. and is radially painted in brown. The convex whorls are transversally crossed by cinguli of equal size and minutely crenulate. They are ornate with longitudinally striated interstices. The margin of the umbilicus has a spiral form with radial grooves. The columella is sinuous in the middle

(Original description in Latin) The shell is orbicularly conical in shape and umbilicate, of a dull flesh colour, and is marked with radiating brown streaks. Its whorls are somewhat convex and are ornamented with equal transverse ridges that are crenulated, while the spaces between them are decorated with longitudinal striations. The margin of the umbilicus is encircled by a spiral brown callus, which is itself marked by radiating striae. The columella is sinuate in its middle portion, lacks any callus, and bears two faint, obsolete tubercles on its anterior part.

== Distribution ==
This marine species occurs off China.
