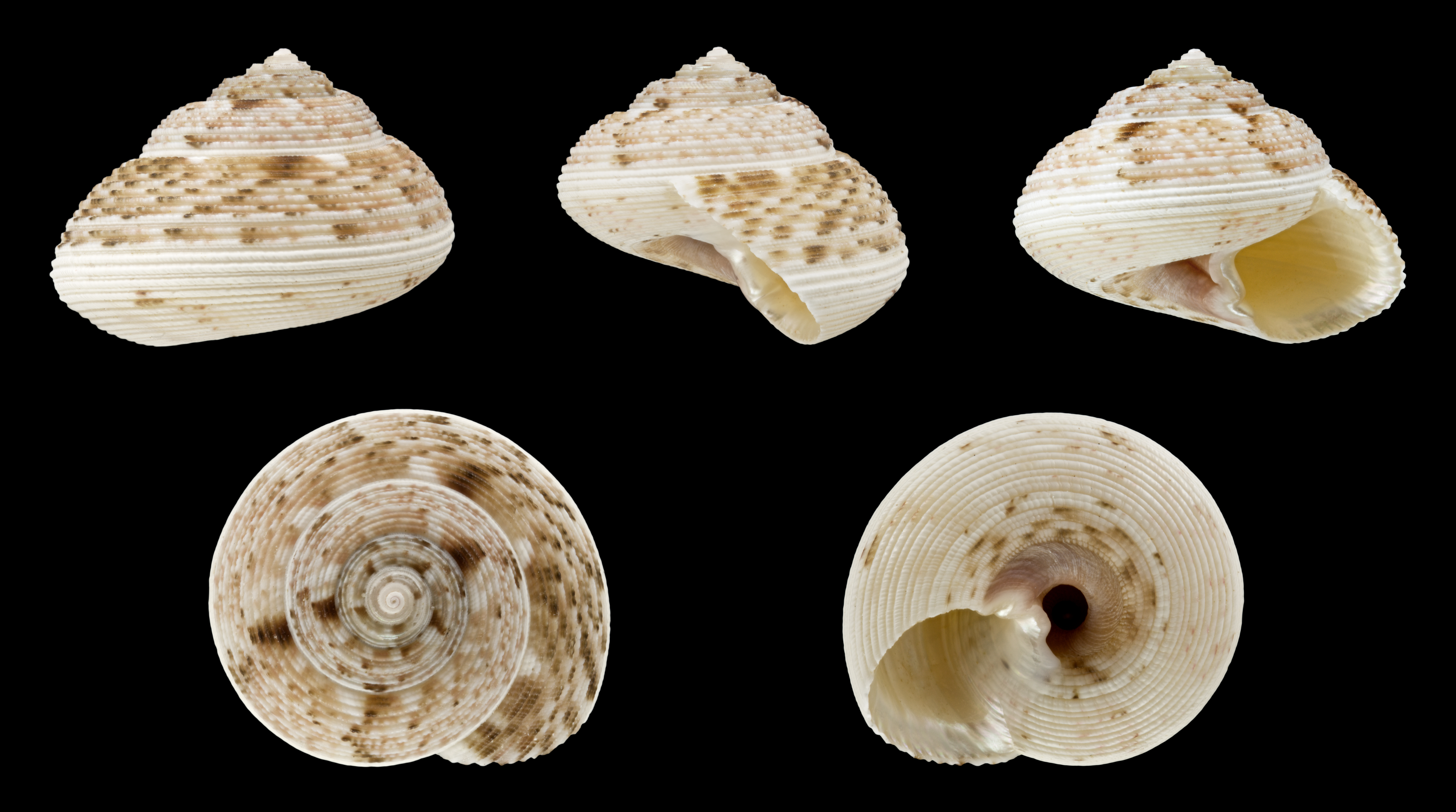
- Five views of a shell of the brown form of Talopena belcheri

Scientific classification
- Kingdom: Animalia
- Phylum: Mollusca
- Class: Gastropoda
- Subclass: Vetigastropoda
- Order: Trochida
- Superfamily: Trochoidea
- Family: Trochidae
- Genus: Talopena
- Species: T. belcheri

Binomial name
- Talopena belcheri (Philippi, 1849)

Synonyms
- Monilea (Monilea) belcheri (R. A. Philippi, 1850) superseded combination; Monilea belcheri (R. A. Philippi, 1850) superseded combination; Trochus belcheri Philippi, 1849 (original combination)

= Talopena belcheri =

Species of gastropod

Talopena belcheri, common name Belcher's top shell, is a species of sea snail, a marine gastropod mollusk in the family Trochidae, the top snails.

== Description ==
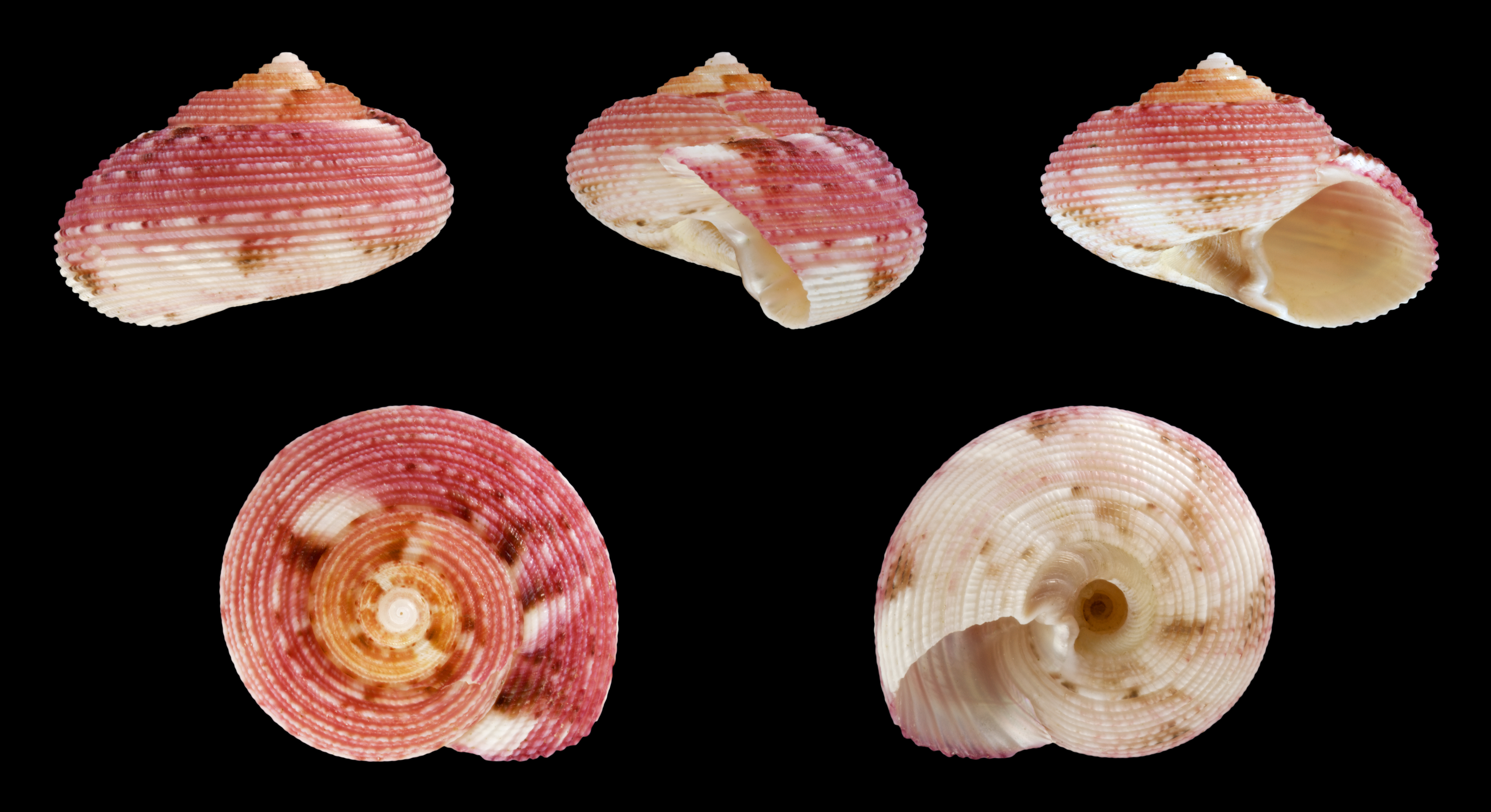
Red form

The size of the shell varies between 12 mm and 17 mm. The umbilicate, thin shell has a depressed-conoidal shape. It is sharply transversely lirate with narrow, elevated, sharp lirae, of which three are stronger, alternating with two or three smaller ones; about 12 similar ones are on the base; all of them are crossed and made subgranose by closely crowded growth lines. Its surface is white, painted with scattered red dots and a few larger red spots. The apex is white or rose-red. The strongly convex whorls are separated by a subcanaliculate suture, the last rounded. The umbilicus is moderate in size and surrounded by a peculiarly reddish-brown colored callus. The aperture is subrhomboidal. The columella is nearly perpendicular and incised at its base.

== Distribution ==
This marine species occurs on sandy beaches and in the subtidal zone off Thailand and in the Western Pacific (Fiji, Tonga, New Caledonia) and off Japan and Queensland, Australia.
