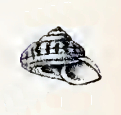
- Drawing of a shell of Antisolarium egenum

Scientific classification
- Kingdom: Animalia
- Phylum: Mollusca
- Class: Gastropoda
- Subclass: Vetigastropoda
- Order: Trochida
- Superfamily: Trochoidea
- Family: Trochidae
- Genus: Antisolarium
- Species: A. egenum

Binomial name
- Antisolarium egenum (Gould, 1849)

Synonyms
- Margarita dilecta A. Adams, 1855; Monilea zealandica Hutton, 1873; Monilea egena Suter, 1913; Solarium egenum Gould, 1849 (original description); Torinia egena Marshall in Tryon, 1887

= Antisolarium egenum =

Species of gastropod

Antisolarium egenum is a small sea snail, a marine gastropod mollusc in the family Trochidae, the top shells.

== Description ==
The size of the shell varies between 4 mm and 7.5 mm. The thin, minute shell has a low ovate-conic shape and is amply umbilicated. Its color is ashy white, pearly beneath. The six whorls are convex. The body whorl is obtusely angular. Each whorl is encircled by four sharply-compressed well-elevated ribs, the two uppermost of which are beaded. The interspaces are concave, smooth, with a single groove near the margin of the umbilicus. The latter occupies a third of the base, is tunnel-shaped and penetrates to the apex. Its sides are excavated on each whorl, the verge of which is crenulated. The aperture is nearly circular, slightly encroached upon by the inflection of the columella. Its interior is pearly. The lip simple.

== Distribution ==
This marine species is endemic to New Zealand.
