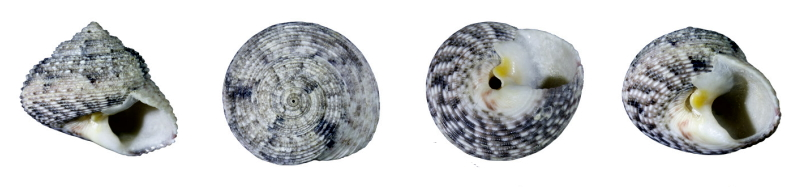
- Shell of Talopena maestratii (holotype)
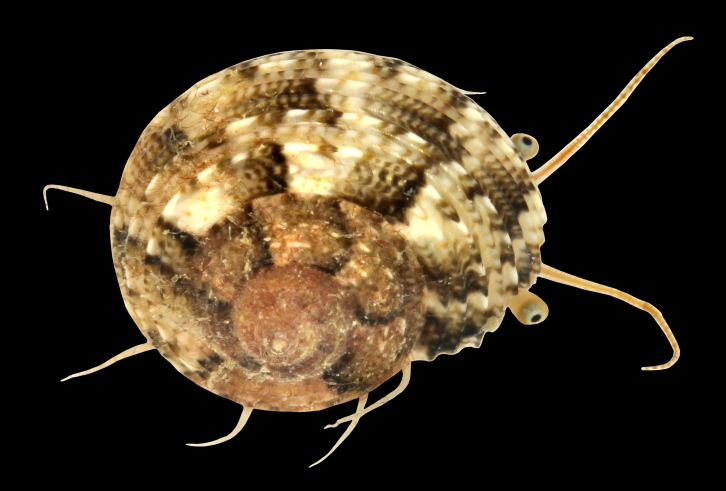
- live specimen (subadult)

Scientific classification
- Kingdom: Animalia
- Phylum: Mollusca
- Class: Gastropoda
- Subclass: Vetigastropoda
- Order: Trochida
- Superfamily: Trochoidea
- Family: Trochidae
- Genus: Talopena
- Species: T. maestratii

Binomial name
- Talopena maestratii (Gould, 1861)

Synonyms
- Monilea cf. menkei Héros et al. 2007

= Talopena maestratii =

Species of gastropod

Talopena maestratii is a species of sea snail, a marine gastropod mollusk in the family Trochidae.

== Description ==
The holotype measures 12.7 mm in height and 15.0 mm in diameter, and the largest specimen reaches 17.0 mm in diameter.

(Original description) The robust shell is moderate to large for the genus, with adults reaching a diameter of up to 17.0 mm. It is globose‑lenticular to trochoid‑turbiniform (H/D 0.75–0.89), and the teleoconch comprises up to seven whorls. The periphery is rounded and situated slightly below mid‑whorl, while the suture lies level with or slightly above the periphery, becoming somewhat channelled on the later spire whorls and slightly descending immediately before the insertion of the outer lip. The base is umbilicate.

The early teleoconch whorls bear three primary spiral cords, with the uppermost cord beginning to define a shoulder during the third whorl. Secondary cords develop on the shoulder and between the primary cords in the fourth whorl, and by the end of the fifth whorl the cords are subequal in strength, sharply defined, and triangular in profile, numbering six to seven. Limited additional intercalation follows, so that the penultimate whorl carries eight to nine cords. The intervals between cords contain fine, close‑set spiral microlirae.

Axial sculpture consists of fine, close‑set pliculae throughout, most evident on the mid‑spire whorls and becoming coarser on the body whorl. The crests of the cords are irregularly undulant rather than beaded, and an additional intermediary cord may arise in the intervals on the last adult whorl in some specimens. The base bears about twelve lower, more rounded spiral cords that become progressively more distinctly beaded by axial pliculae toward the umbilicus.

The umbilicus is of variable width, usually moderate to narrow. Its margin is defined by a broad, thickened band with relatively coarse, curved axial folds and faint spiral threads. Within the umbilicus there is a broad funicle, above which lies a deep channel. The aperture is roundly quadrate, and the peristome is interrupted across the parietal region. The columellar lip is thick, with a reflected lobe at the end of the umbilical funicle and a thickened, somewhat granular pad at the end of the peri‑umbilical band; a weak tooth is often present at the base of the columella. The parietal region bears a thick, rounded callus lobe adjacent to the columellar insertion. The outer lip is simple, with its edge scalloped by the spiral cords, strongly prosocline above the periphery and orthocline below; in live‑collected specimens the interior is nacreous and shows no in‑running spiral ridges, although the external sculpture is visible through the nacre.

The shell surface is somewhat lustreless, and the colour pattern is highly variable. It is commonly mottled in shades of charcoal‑grey, cream, and white, often with subsutural and peripheral blotches and irregular axial bands; the base is usually less heavily pigmented. The peri‑umbilical band is white to cream, sometimes marked sparsely with reddish spots, and in adults the lobe at the end of the umbilical funicle is bright yellow. Specimens from the Nouméa area often show more brownish and red or pink mottling. Occasional individuals have the apical surface almost uniformly white, except for a pink tip to the spire.

The protoconch is typically umboniine, with a diameter of about 195 µm, and is white. An apical beak is present and confluent with the terminal lip. The apical bulb is sculptured with subradial threads, with additional subspiral threads visible toward the suture; together these form a rectangular network, and the terminal lip is weakly convex. The operculum and radula correspond to those of Talopena apicina.

The external anatomy (mostly from rehydrated specimens) includes a head with a distinct forehead between the cephalic tentacles. The snout is moderately long, with numerous slender papillae on its distal half. Cephalic lappets are not evident. The cephalic tentacles are slender and micropapillate, with the left and right tentacles similar in size. The eyestalks are thick, and each tip is conspicuously expanded and contains a large black eye. The left neck‑lobe bears about twelve digits, well developed anteriorly and progressively smaller posteriorly, while the right neck‑lobe is well developed and rolled to form a long exhalant siphon. There are four micropapillate epipodial tentacles on each side, each with a stalked epipodial sense organ near its base, and another stalked epipodial sense organ is present beneath each neck‑lobe. The propodium is indented along the midline, forming a lateral propodial lobe on each side, and the foot is flattened, with a broad sole that tapers posteriorly. The head–foot is mostly whitish, with the forehead, snout, and sides of the foot bearing some darker pigmentation. The ctenidium is bipectinate, with its tip unattached.

== Distribution ==
This marine species occurs off New Caledonia.
