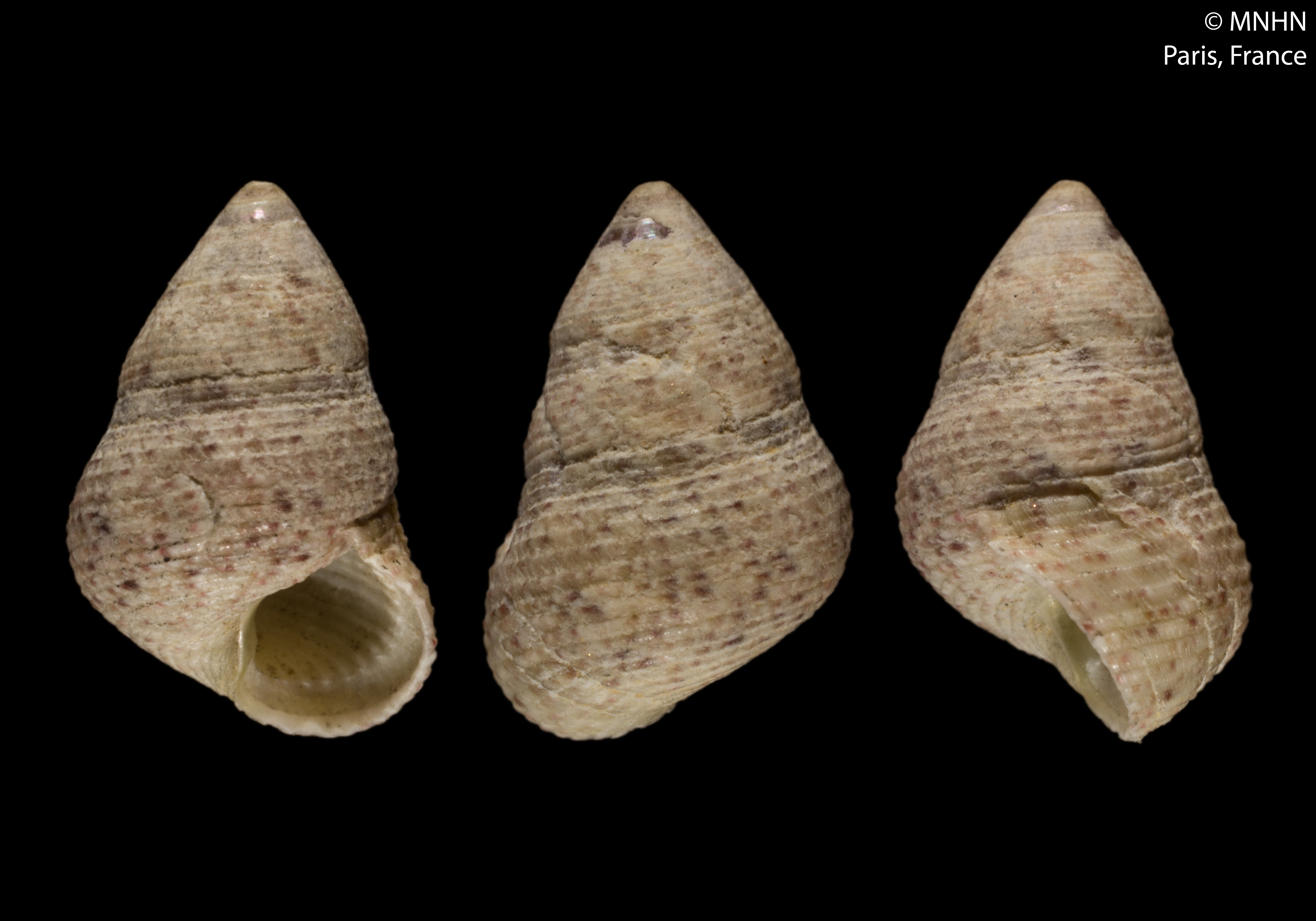
- Shell of Priotrochus goudoti (syntype at MNHN, Paris)

Scientific classification
- Kingdom: Animalia
- Phylum: Mollusca
- Class: Gastropoda
- Subclass: Vetigastropoda
- Order: Trochida
- Family: Trochidae
- Subfamily: Cantharidinae
- Genus: Priotrochus
- Species: P. goudoti

Binomial name
- Priotrochus goudoti (Fischer, 1878)

Synonyms
- Monilea (Priotrochus) chrysolamea (Martens, 1880); Monilea (Priotrochus) goudoti (Fischer, 1878); Monilea chrysolamea (Martens, 1880); Monilea goudoti (P. Fischer, 1878); Priotrochus chrysolaemus (Martens, 1880); Trochus (Priotrochus) goudoti (Fischer, 1878); Trochus chrysolaemus Martens, 1880; Trochus goudoti (Fischer, 1878)

= Priotrochus goudoti =

Species of gastropod

Priotrochus goudoti is a species of sea snail, a marine gastropod mollusk in the family Trochidae, the top snails.

== Description ==
The height of the shell attains 9 mm, its diameter 6 mm. The small, imperforate, thick shell has a conoid-elongated shape. It is whitish-ashen, punctate with rose-color, maculate with spadiceous. The 6 to 7 whorls 6 are convex. They are spirally cingulate, the penultimate whorls with 8 cinguli. The body whorl is elongated, rounded in the middle, appressed below the suture, convex beneath. The aperture is ovate-subquadrate. The lip is crenulated. The columella is arcuate and delicately crenulated.

== Distribution ==
This species occurs in the Indian Ocean off Madagascar, the Comoros, and the Mascarene Basin.
