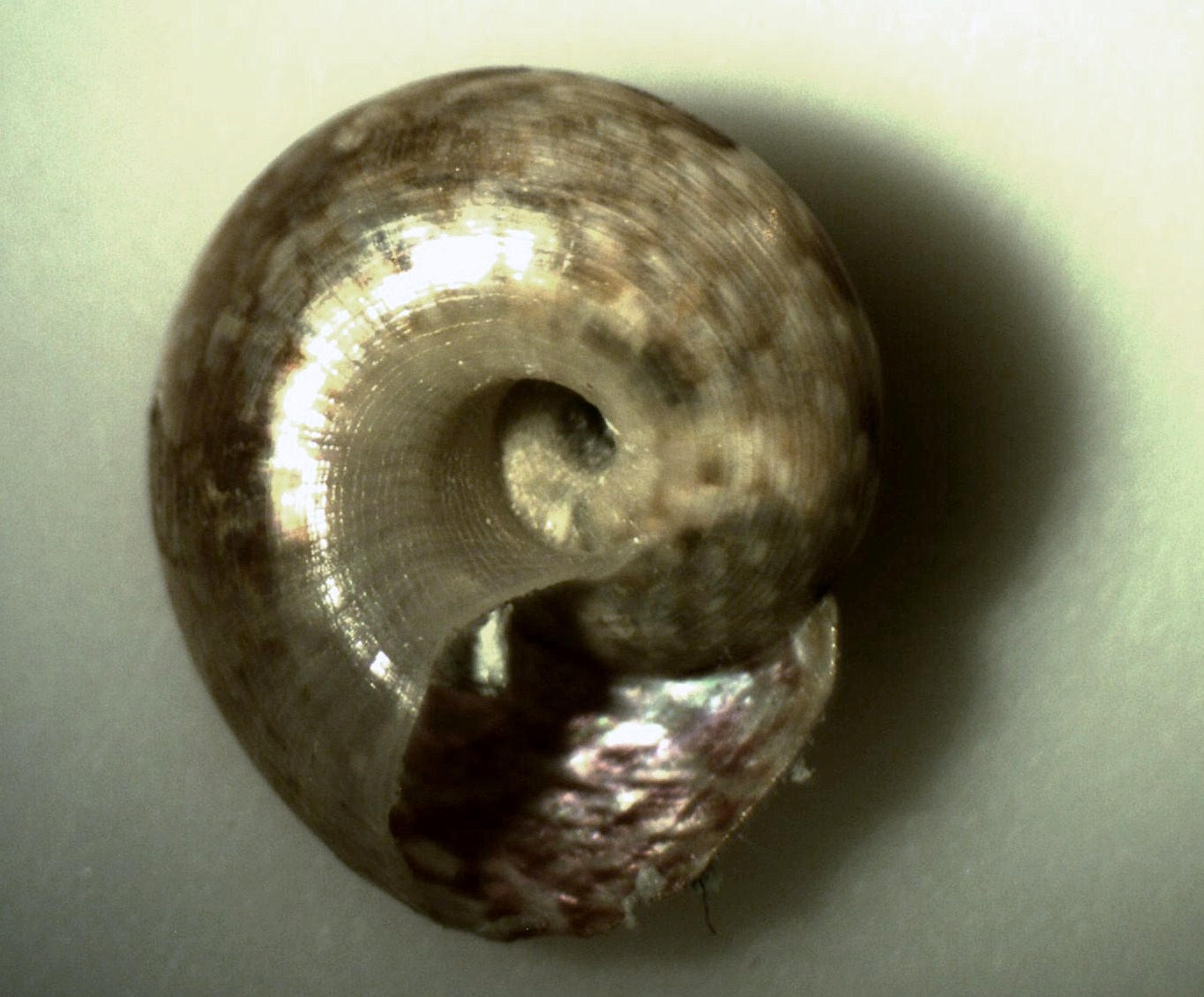
- Apertural view of a shell of Sericominolia vernicosa

Scientific classification
- Kingdom: Animalia
- Phylum: Mollusca
- Class: Gastropoda
- Subclass: Vetigastropoda
- Order: Trochida
- Superfamily: Trochoidea
- Family: Trochidae
- Genus: Sericominolia
- Species: S. vernicosa

Binomial name
- Sericominolia vernicosa (Gould, 1861)

Synonyms
- Monilea vernicosa Gould, 1861 (original combination); Talopena vernicosa (Gould, 1861)

= Sericominolia vernicosa =

Species of gastropod

Sericominolia vernicosa is a species of sea snail, a marine gastropod mollusk in the family Trochidae, the top snails.

== Description ==
The length of the shell varies between 4.5 mm and 12 mm. The small, thin shell has a depressed globose shape. It is finely reticulated with many green striae at the suture which spread squarely to the periphery. The shell is painted with four articulated colored bands. The five convex whorls are subacute at the periphery. The suture is deep. The base of the shell is convex and the pale umbilicus is deep. The aperture is large. The columella is dilated, its edge is angulated, terminating below in a tooth.

== Distribution ==
This species occurs in the Indo-West Pacific.
