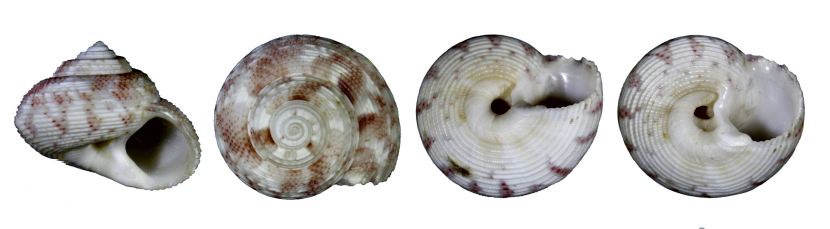
- Shell of Talopena apicina

Scientific classification
- Kingdom: Animalia
- Phylum: Mollusca
- Class: Gastropoda
- Subclass: Vetigastropoda
- Order: Trochida
- Family: Trochidae
- Genus: Talopena
- Species: T. apicina

Binomial name
- Talopena apicina (Gould, 1861)

Synonyms
- Isanda (Parminolia) apicina (A. A. Gould, 1861)

= Talopena apicina =

Species of gastropod

Talopena apicina is a species of sea snail, a marine gastropod mollusk in the family Trochidae.

== Description ==
The small, white shell has an ovate-conic shape and is spirally striate. The interstices, with the aid of lens, appear finely striate longitudinally. The shell is ornated around the sutures with bright, rose-colored, equidistant flamules. The five convex whorls, including the apex, are obtuse at the periphery. The sutures are immersed; between the sutures the spire is angulated. The convex base of the shell shows somewhat granulate incremental lines. At the periphery the spiral rib is encircled with minute pink dots. The small umbilicus is deep and narrow and has a marginal callus. The aperture is almost circular. The peristome is thickened and a little relfexed.

== Distribution ==
This marine species occurs off New Caledonia, the Loyalty Islands, Marshall Islands, and off Queensland, Australia
