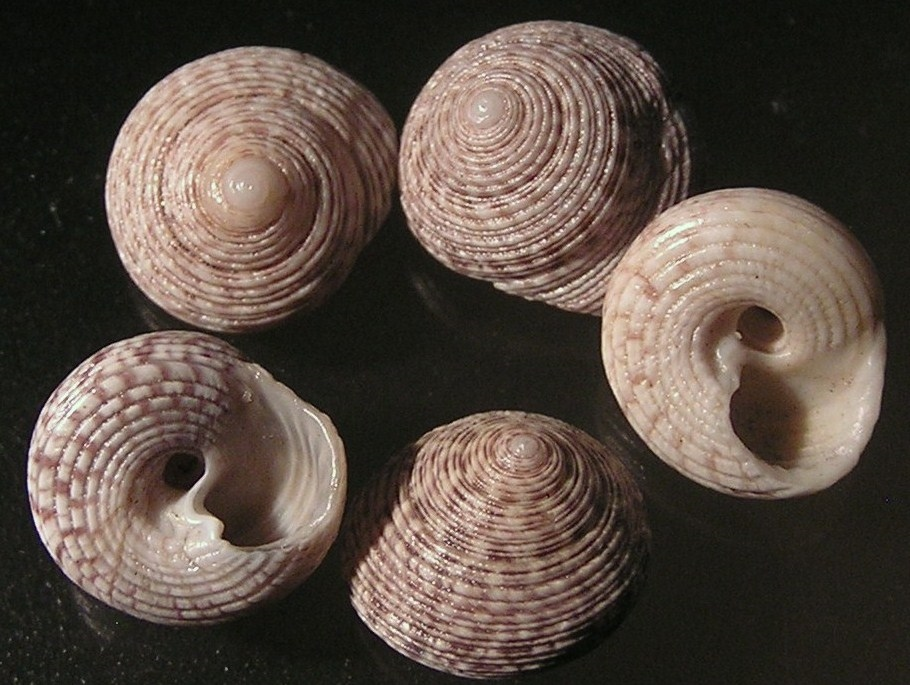
- Five shells of Monilea callifera

Scientific classification
- Kingdom: Animalia
- Phylum: Mollusca
- Class: Gastropoda
- Subclass: Vetigastropoda
- Order: Trochida
- Superfamily: Trochoidea
- Family: Trochidae
- Genus: Monilea
- Species: M. callifera

Binomial name
- Monilea callifera (Lamarck, 1822)

Synonyms
- † Talopia dividua Iredale, 1929; † Talopia morti Iredale, 1929; Trochus corrugata Koch, 1843; Trochus calliferus Lamarck, 1822 (basionym); Trochus rigatus Philippi, 1849; Trochus (Monilea) masoni G. & H. Nevill, 1874

= Monilea callifera =

Species of gastropod

Monilea callifera, commonly known as the shrewd trochid, is a species of sea snail, a marine gastropod mollusk in the family Trochidae, the top snails.

The Australian Faunal Directory recognizes Monilea lentiginosa Adams, 1853 as a synonym of Monilea callifera.

== Description ==
The size of an adult shell varies between 12 mm and 24 mm. The lusterless conoidal shell is narrowly umbilicate, more or less depressed, strong and solid. Its color is whitish or yellowish, with radiating maculations or stripes above; the base unicolored or obliquely striped with the stripes often interrupted. The conoidal spire has an acute, corneous apex. The sutures are impressed. There are about six convex whorls, the last one rounded at the periphery but often with a tendency to be biangulate there. The sculpture is densely finely lirate all over. The lirae are very closely and finely beaded by the oblique incremental striae which are prominent in the interliral spaces. The oblique aperture is rounded-quadrate and conspicuously lirate within. The ten lirae extend nearly to the edge of the outer lip. The columella is short, ending below in a denticle, concave above and reflected partly over the umbilicus, and over the termination of a strong spiral funicle, which almost fills the white umbilicus.

== Distribution ==
This marine species occurs in the intertidal and subtidal zones along the shores of Australia (New South Wales, Northern Territory, Queensland, Western Australia), the Philippines, New Caledonia, Japan, India, Sri Lanka, the Andaman Islands.
