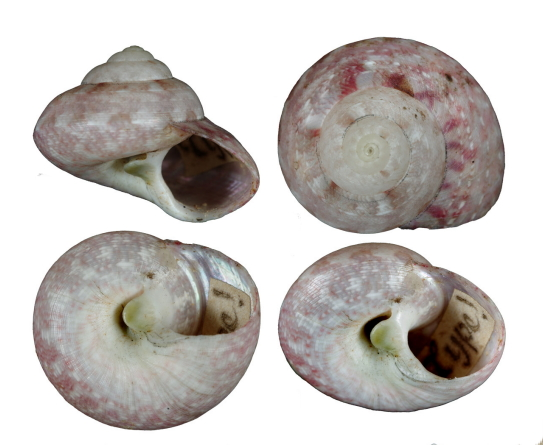
- Shell of Sericominolia lifuana

Scientific classification
- Kingdom: Animalia
- Phylum: Mollusca
- Class: Gastropoda
- Subclass: Vetigastropoda
- Order: Trochida
- Superfamily: Trochoidea
- Family: Trochidae
- Genus: Sericominolia
- Species: S. lifuana

Binomial name
- Sericominolia lifuana (P. Fischer, 1878)

Synonyms
- Minolia lifouana [sic] (misspelling of specific epithet); Monilea (Monilea) lifuana (P. Fischer, 1878) superseded combination; Monilea lifuana (P. Fischer, 1878) superseded combination; Trochus (Monilea) lifuanus P. Fischer, 1878 superseded combination; Trochus lifuanus P. Fischer, 1878 superseded combination

= Sericominolia lifuana =

Species of gastropod

Sericominolia lifuana, the fawn top shell, is a species of small sea snail, a marine gastropod mollusk in the family Trochidae, the top snails.

== Description ==
The holotype measures 10.7 mm in height and 13.6 mm in diameter and is the largest specimen examined.

(Redescription) The shell is thin and of moderate size, with adults reaching a diameter of up to 14 mm; it is wider than high, although spire height is variable (H/D 0.73–0.86). The spire whorls are rounded and sometimes weakly shouldered, with the periphery situated just below mid‑whorl and rounded or only weakly angled. The sculpture is fine and predominantly spiral. The base is rounded and narrowly umbilicate, and the teleoconch comprises up to seven whorls.

The first teleoconch whorl bears three narrow spiral lirae, which broaden on the second whorl and increase in number by intercalation of intermediate lirae. Subsequent whorls are sculptured with low, close‑set spiral lirae separated by narrower intervals, the lirae often alternating in strength as intermediaries arise. Axial sculpture is initially weak and consists only of close‑set microscopic threads; on later whorls it develops into fine, regular, close‑set collabral pliculae accompanied by irregular growth lines. Basal sculpture consists of fewer, broader, flat‑topped lirae separated by narrow incised striae, with axial pliculae much less distinct; the lirae are more closely spaced within the umbilicus. The umbilicus is relatively narrow, its rim rounded and distinctly thickened, and rendered pliculate by the growth lines. A strong funicle lies within the umbilicus, and above it a deep sulcus underlies the insertion on the penultimate whorl.

The aperture is roundly quadrate, and the peristome is interrupted across the parietal region. The base of the columella is considerably thickened where the umbilical rim terminates, with a second thickening above this at the end of the funicle; the surfaces of these thickenings are microscopically granular. The outer lip is simple, and the interior is smooth and weakly nacreous.

The colour and pattern are highly variable. The ground colour is commonly mottled in pastel shades of pink and yellow‑brown, with olive‑green subsutural and peripheral blotches or axial flames, and with white‑flecked capillary lines on the spiral lirae. The blotches may be maroon in some shells or dark green in others; additional specimens are more uniformly coloured or show fine white and pink mottling, or bold spiral colour bands. Some juveniles are whitish with a distinctive pattern of three spiral bands of squarish brown blotches, one below the suture, one at the periphery, and one on the base. The umbilical region is pale and unpatterned, but the reflected end of the umbilical funicle is olive‑green, greyish‑green, or olive‑brown, and occasionally reddish, particularly in material from the Chesterfield–Bellona Plateau; the funicle itself is often of the same colour.

The protoconch is typically umboniine, with a diameter of about 170–185 µm. An apical beak is present and merges with the terminal lip. The apical bulb is sculptured with oblique and subspiral threads that form an irregular quadrate network, and the terminal lip is weakly convex. The operculum is corneous and multispiral, but with relatively few whorls; whorl overlap is narrow, the peripheral fringe is not obviously striate, and the surface lacks spiral microsculpture.

The radula has the formula ∞+(1)+5+1+5+(1)+∞ and comprises approximately 35–40 transverse rows of teeth. The teeth of the central field are reduced and lack both shafts and cusps. The rachidian base‑plate is broadly trigonal with a blunt anterior edge. The base‑plates of the inner lateral teeth are expanded and bluntly rounded basally, with the outer anterior edge somewhat raised and ridge‑like, whereas the outer lateral teeth are less trigonal and more elongate.

The innermost marginal tooth is transitional, with a reduced shaft and cusp. The remaining marginal teeth are well developed and bear a strongly recurved cusp. In the inner marginal teeth, the cusp carries a large, bluntly lanceolate central denticle that bears a robust, pointed denticle at its outer base and a minute denticle at its inner base, the latter usually obscured by overlapping teeth. Marginals 3–10 have the largest cusps, which then decrease progressively in size towards the outer margin, where the outermost cusps show finely pectinate edges.

External anatomy (from rehydrated specimens): The head bears a distinct forehead between the cephalic tentacles. The snout is long and somewhat flared toward its tip, with a transverse row of digit‑like papillae halfway down its anterior face; the distal portion and the edge of the oral disc are finely papillate. Cephalic lappets are not evident. The cephalic tentacles are long, slender, and micropapillate, with the left and right sides similar in size. The eyestalks are long, with their tips expanded to contain large black eyes.

The left neck‑lobe forms a broad flap of tissue with a finely digitate margin, more extensive anteriorly, whereas the right neck‑lobe is well developed and is rolled to form an exhalant siphon. There are four micropapillate epipodial tentacles on each side, each bearing a well‑developed stalked epipodial sense organ near its base; an additional epipodial sense organ is present beneath each neck‑lobe. The propodium is slightly indented along the midline and somewhat pinched just before the tip, thereby forming a small lateral propodial lobe on each side, and the foot tapers posteriorly to a point.

The head–foot is mostly pale translucent buff, with the forehead somewhat darker. The eyestalks and epipodial sense organs show opaque white pigmentation. The cephalic and epipodial tentacles bear faint transverse dark bands. The sides of the foot are translucent and finely speckled with white. The ctenidium is evidently bipectinate, with its anterior portion unattached.

== Distribution ==
This marine species occurs off New Caledonia.
