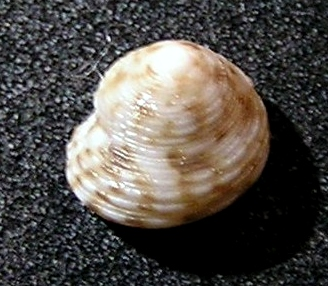
- Shell of Sericominolia gloriola

Scientific classification
- Kingdom: Animalia
- Phylum: Mollusca
- Class: Gastropoda
- Subclass: Vetigastropoda
- Order: Trochida
- Superfamily: Trochoidea
- Family: Trochidae
- Genus: Sericominolia
- Species: S. gloriola

Binomial name
- Sericominolia gloriola (Iredale, 1929)

Synonyms
- Monilea gloriola (Iredale, 1929) superseded combination; Talopena gloriola Iredale, 1929

= Sericominolia gloriola =

Species of gastropod

Sericominolia gloriola, common name the fawn top shell, is a species of small sea snail, a marine gastropod mollusk in the family Trochidae, the top snails.

== Description ==
The size of the shell varies between 6 mm and 10 mm.

(Original description)The shell is conoid-turbinate, narrowly umbilicate, and relatively thin. The whorls are flatly convex and lack a distinct shoulder. Its coloration is greyish-fawn, irregularly mottled with varying shades of brown. A wavy pattern of angular flames persists on the base, although this pattern is often indistinct. The apex is very small and consists of approximately one whorl, followed by six adult whorls. A slight shoulder is evident on the earlier whorls but gradually disappears on the later ones.

The sculpture consists of fine spiral lirae that begin on the early whorls and increase in number throughout growth, although they show little variation in strength between the first and last whorls. In contrast, the very fine longitudinal striae are scarcely discernible on the earliest whorls but become progressively stronger on each successive whorl. On the body whorl, they nearly equal the spiral lirae in prominence, although they remain slightly weaker and more numerous. Together, these sculptural elements produce a weak cancellate pattern that is almost equally well developed on the base. The entire shell surface has a dull, matte appearance but is not noticeably roughened.

The aperture is subcircular and slightly angular, with the peripheral angulation becoming more pronounced at the mouth. The outer lip is thin, while the columella is gently curved and bears a medial funicle that extends into the umbilical cavity. The umbilicus is deep and narrow, bounded by a thickened rib that continues onto the columella.

== Distribution ==
This marine species occurs off Southeast Australia.
