= William Wood (zoologist) =

English zoologist (1774–1857)

William Wood FRS FLS (1774–1857), was an English surgeon, zoologist and entomologist.

He was born in Kendal, Westmorland and trained in surgery at St Bartholomew's Hospital. He practised for several years as a surgeon at Wingham, near Canterbury and in London, but left the medical profession to become a natural history bookseller, publisher and naturalist.

He was the author of several natural history books, especially on the Mollusca. He was also a Fellow of the Royal Society (elected 1812) and a Fellow of the Linnean Society.

He died in Ruislip, Middlesex.

== Works ==
Partial list

- Index testaceologicus, or, A catalogue of shells, British and foreign : arranged according to the Linnean system : with the Latin and English names, references to authors, and places where found : illustrated with 2,300 figures. London Printed for W. Wood London, Printed for W. Wood,1818. Second edition 1828.
- Index entomologicus, or, A complete illustrated catalogue, consisting of 1,944 figures, of the lepidopterous insects of Great Britain London William Wood,1839.
- An illustrated, enlarged, and English edition of Lamarck's Species of shells comprising the whole of the recent additions in Deshayes' last French edition, with numerous species not noticed by that naturalist, accompanied by accurate delineations of almost all the shells described London :W. Wood 1843
